= Airport Drive (Melbourne) =

Freeway in Melbourne, Australia

Airport Drive Victoria
- Coordinates: 37.6755°S 144.8522°E (North end); 37.7163°S 144.8769°E (South end)

General information
- Type: Highway
- Length: 5.7 km (3.5 mi)
- Opened: 1997–2015

Major junctions
- North end: Grants Road; Melbourne Airport
- Tullamarine Freeway; Sharps Road; Western Ring Road
- South end: Westfield Drive; Tullamarine, Melbourne

Location(s)
- Major suburbs: Melbourne Airport, Tullamarine

Highway system
- Highways in Australia; National Highway • Freeways in Australia; Highways in Victoria

Airport Drive is a 5.7 kilometre highway in Melbourne, Australia, linking Centre Road at Melbourne Airport with the M80 Ring Road at Airport West. This road is an important thoroughfare for the adjacent Melbourne Airport Business Park along South Centre Road, and acts as an alternative access road to Tullamarine Freeway.

== Route ==
Airport Drive starts at the intersection of Grants and Centre Road at Melbourne Airport, just south of Terminal 4, running east as a four-lane, dual-carriageway road past the Long Term Parking lot, turning south-east past more car parks and Airport service companies, before turning south along a wide alignment (to incorporate a future railway link to the airport) to the intersection with Sharps Road, then through the Tullamarine Park industrial area to terminate at the Western Ring Road; Westfield Drive continues past the interchange over the Albion–Jacana railway line to link to the Westfield Airport West shopping centre just under a kilometre away.

== History ==
Airport Drive originally opened to traffic between Sharps Road and the Western Ring Road in May 1997. The 'concept design' for tendering a design/construct project, was for a standard 7-lane 'diamond' interchange. Andrew O'Brien & Associates was engaged by Leightons to assist in safety and design matters. It proposed the 'dumbbell' option as it reduced the bridge to a 2-lane bridge and avoided major trunk power tower relocations. After considerable analyses by VicRoads and NSW experts, they agreed with the proposal. Due to the huge cost savings, Leightons won the design/build contract. It was arguably the first pure dumbbell interchange in the world.

The passing of the Road Management Act 2004 granted the responsibility of overall management and development of Victoria's major arterial roads to VicRoads: in 2004, VicRoads declared Airport Connection Road (Freeway #1280) from Western Ring Road in Tullamarine to Sharps Road in Tullamarine; the declaration formally makes this section a freeway; signposts along this section have also kept their original name.

In July 2013, construction began on an extension from Sharps Road to the intersection of Melrose Drive and Mercer Drive, Melbourne Airport. Airport Drive Extension opened to traffic on 28 June 2015, at a cost of $100 million, with the existing Melrose Drive roadway between Mercer Drive and Centre Road subsumed into Airport Drive. As part of the extension project, Link Road was realigned to form a new traffic-light intersection at Airport Drive, with through traffic connecting to Watson Drive and Melrose Drive. The extension is not part of VicRoads' freeway declaration and presently remains undeclared.

== Intersections ==
LGA	Location	km	mi	Destinations	Notes
Hume	Melbourne Airport	0.0	0.0	Grants Road	Continues west as Grants Road
Hume	Melbourne Airport	0.0	0.0	Centre Road	Traffic light intersection
Hume	Melbourne Airport	0.6	0.37	Naarm Way, to T4 Transport Hub access road	No southbound access
Hume	Melbourne Airport	0.7	0.43	Tullamarine Freeway (M2 east) – Docklands, Port Melbourne; Apac Drive (west)	Traffic light intersection
Hume	Melbourne Airport	1.3	0.81	Francis Briggs Drive (west); Mercer Drive (east)	Roundabout; no access to Mercer Drive
Hume	Melbourne Airport	2.5	1.6	Link Road, to Melrose Drive – Tullamarine	Traffic light intersection
Hume	Melbourne Airport	3.0	1.9	Sky Road	Northbound entrance and exit only
Hume–Brimbank boundary	Melbourne Airport–Tullamarine boundary	4.1	2.5	Sharps Road (Metro Route 39) – Keilor Park, Gladstone Park, Mickleham	Traffic light intersection
Brimbank	Tullamarine	5.7	3.5	Western Ring Road (M80) – Laverton North, Thomastown	Dogbone interchange
Brimbank	Tullamarine	5.7	3.5	Westfield Drive – Airport West	Continues east as Westfield Drive
Incomplete access; Route transition
