= Tullamarine Freeway =

Freeway in Melbourne, Victoria, Australia

Tullamarine Freeway Victoria
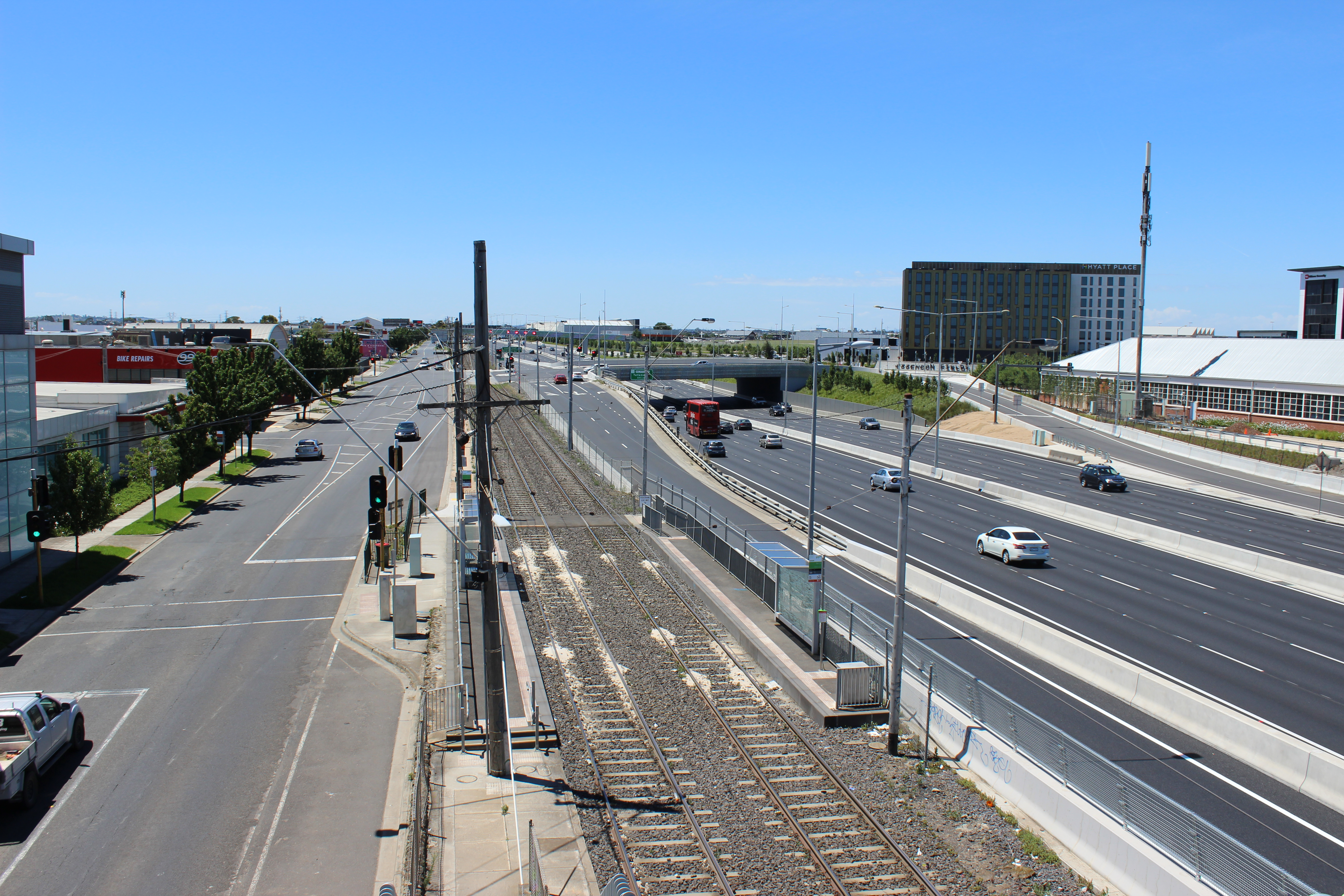
- Tullamarine Freeway and parallel tram tracks adjacent to Essendon Fields Airport, looking northwards
- Coordinates: 37.673041°S 144.856795°E (Northwest end); 37.735340°S 144.904473°E (Southeast end)

General information
- Type: Freeway
- Length: 9.5 km (5.9 mi)
- Opened: 1968–1979
- Route number(s): M2 (2018–present)
- Former route number: Metro Route 43 (1989–2018) Entire route; Freeway Route 81 (1970–1987) (Melbourne Airport–Travancore); Metro Route 40 (1989–2020) (Essendon North–Pascoe Vale South); Metro Route 40 (1970–1989) (Melbourne Airport–Pascoe Vale South); National Route 79 (1970–2013) (Essendon North–Travancore)

Major junctions
- Northwest end: Sunbury Road; Tullamarine, Melbourne
- Mickleham Road; Western Ring Road; Calder Freeway; Bulla Road
- Southeast end: CityLink; Strathmore, Melbourne

Location(s)
- LGA(s): City of Hume; City of Moonee Valley
- Major suburbs / towns: Gladstone Park, Essendon

Highway system
- Highways in Australia; National Highway • Freeways in Australia; Highways in Victoria

The Tullamarine Freeway (commonly referred to as The Tulla), is a major urban freeway in Melbourne, Victoria, Australia, linking Melbourne Airport to the Melbourne City Centre. It carries up to 210,000 vehicles per day and is one of Australia's busiest freeways. The entire stretch of the Tullamarine Freeway bears the designation M2 (previously Metro Route 43 from 1989 to early 2018).

== Route ==
The Tullamarine Freeway starts just outside Melbourne Airport, where it intersects with Sunbury Road, and runs southeast as a six-lane dual-carriageway freeway through Gladstone Park, eventually meeting with the Western Ring Road in a major interchange. Heading further south as eight lanes, it skirts the western and southern boundaries of Essendon Airport through Airport West, where it meets the Calder Freeway and widens further to ten lanes. East of the intersection with Bulla Road, it officially becomes CityLink's Western link, running south to eventually meet the West Gate Freeway in Port Melbourne: before being subsumed into CityLink in 1999, the southern end of the Tullamarine Freeway ran south through the Moonee Ponds Creek reserve to terminate just north of central Melbourne in Parkville.

The section through Airport West is frequently congested due to the combination of freight traffic to/from the Hume Highway (accessed from the Western Ring Road interchange), and traffic to/from the airport. The usual peak period travel time is between 19 and 30 minutes.

== Naming ==
The name is derived from Tullamareena, a young member of the Indigenous Wurundjeri clan, who in 1838 escaped from Melbourne's first gaol by burning it to the ground.

== History ==
The Tullamarine Freeway is one of the oldest freeways in Melbourne. The core of the freeway through Airport West began as a deviation of Lancefield Road from the north-west of Essendon Airport, constructed during the 1945/46 financial year as a new single carriageway along the western and southern boundaries of the airport, east of the existing service road (today Matthews Avenue) and tram-way, totalling 2.5 miles (4.0 km), planned to reconnect at Sunbury Road (today Bulla Road) in Essendon North. A satisfactory alignment at the eastern end could not be obtained without the demolition of numerous residences however, therefore only the 1.5 miles (2.4 km) section following the western boundary of the aerodrome was constructed, with a temporary connection to Melbourne-Bendigo Road (today Keilor Road) via Treadwell Road, Essendon North; the rest of the deviation to Sunbury Road was built during the 1959/60 financial year as a dual-carriageway road. Lancefield Road was progressively duplicated during the 1960s, including from Treadwell Road to north of Vaughan Street, and from Hawker Street to Parer Road.

The first stage of construction on a new Tullamarine By-pass Road was completed in the 1965/66 financial year, between Mickleham Road and "the Tullamarine Jetport Terminal area" (Melbourne Airport), with the initial 4.5-mile (7.2 km) section between Tullamarine Airport and Lancefield Road at the north-western corner of Essendon Airport officially opening early in 1968. From Essendon, a new section heading east from Lancefield Road at Bulla Road, over Pascoe Vale Road, to link directly with Bell Street, incorporating 2 miles of divided road and 4 miles of ramps and known at the time as Strathmore By-pass Road, began construction early in 1968, with further construction to extend the freeway south along the Moonee Ponds Creek reserve to Mount Alexander Road at Flemington Bridge, carried out by the Melbourne & Metropolitan Board of Works (MMBW). All three sections - the Tullamarine By-pass Road, the Strathmore By-pass Road, and the MMBW's southern extension to Flemington Bridge - were officially opened as the Tullamarine Freeway on 3 February 1970, by Premier of Victoria Sir Henry Bolte MLA, in time for the official opening of Tullamarine Airport (now renamed Melbourne Airport) in mid-1970; this new section replaced Mount Alexander Road as the main route to the city. In 1974, the section constructed by the MMBW was transferred to be under the direct responsibility of the Country Roads Board; the Board's declaration of the Tullamarine Freeway was extended to Flemington Bridge as a direct result. In 1979, the section of Lancefield Road running along the western edge of Essendon Airport was upgraded to freeway standard, with the elimination of all at-grade intersections (at English and Vaughan Streets, and an access road to Matthews Avenue near Parer Road), and the opening of a grade-separated, diamond-interchange with English Street, effectively completing the freeway.

With its completion, city-bound heavy vehicles from Hume Highway were diverted here via Pascoe Vale Road. In the 1990s, the completion of the Western Ring Road increased traffic tremendously. It was only relieved by the completion of CityLink in 1999, widening the freeway to 8 lanes (two of these being transit lanes) and extending it south to the West Gate Freeway at Port Melbourne. The improved sections, starting east of Bulla Road, were subsumed into CityLink as the northern half of the Western link, and are now tolled.

Lancefield Road was signed as Metropolitan Route 40 between Essendon North and Tullamarine in 1965, with Metropolitan Route 40 continuing north along Sunbury Road to eventually terminate in Bulla. When the Tullamarine By-pass Road opened in 1968 between Essendon Airport and Tullamarine Airport, Metropolitan Route 40 was re-routed onto the new freeway. It was re-routed again from Bell Street onto the Strathmore By-pass Road section of the freeway, once it and the Bell Street interchange opened in 1970. Once the Tullamarine Freeway southern extension opened in 1970, the entire freeway from Tullamarine to Travancore was signed as Freeway Route 81, sharing concurrency with Metropolitan Route 40 from Tullamarine to Pascoe Vale South, and also another concurrency with National Route 79 from Essendon North to Travancore once the Calder Freeway bypass of Niddrie opened in 1972. Metropolitan Route 40 was re-routed onto Calder Freeway in 1989: Metropolitan Route 43 replaced it from Essendon North to Tullamarine in 1989, while Freeway Route 81 was abolished in the same year. When CityLink opened in 1999, Metropolitan Route 43 was extended along the entire freeway, including the Western link, to its end in Port Melbourne. With Victoria's conversion to the newer alphanumeric system in the late 1990s, the vestige of National Route 79 was finally abolished in 2013 (Calder Freeway had already converted to M79 in 1997), and conversion of Metropolitan Route 43 to route M2 began, finally completed in 2018. The concurrency with Metropolitan Route 40 was abolished in 2020, when it was re-aligned to terminate at Bell Street interchange.

The freeway is used by SkyBus services to Melbourne Airport, and in 2002 the Victorian government contributed $3 million to a $10 million plan to expand and improve these services, after a feasibility study into an airport rail link found the number of passengers using a train would not make the scheme economically viable.

The passing of the Road Management Act 2004 granted the responsibility of overall management and development of Victoria's major arterial roads to VicRoads: in 2004, VicRoads re-declared Tullamarine Freeway (Freeway #1810) from Melbourne-Lancefield Road (today Sunbury Road) at Melbourne Airport to Mount Alexander Road (sign-posted as Bulla Road) in Strathmore, south of Essendon Airport.

Upgrades to the interchange with Calder Freeway were announced in January 2005, which underwent dramatic reconstruction to alleviate congestion. Entry and exit ramps between both freeways were decommissioned and replaced, an additional two lanes inbound were added, with dedicated Bulla Road-Calder Freeway spurs to eliminate weaving, notorious for many accidents in the area; the new inbound lanes towards the city were completed in October 2006 (ten months early), and new outbound lanes towards Melbourne airport were completed in February 2007 (five months early). Another project completed later that year was a new bridge and northern entrance to the Essendon Airport through the interchange of Melrose Drive, to provide easy access for the people living in the northern suburbs to access the Essendon Airport district. Both projects were planned, designed and constructed under an alliance agreement between VicRoads, Baulderstone Hornibrook and Parsons Brinckerhoff.

=== Timeline of construction ===
- 1945/46 – Lancefield Road deviation, 1.5 miles (2.4 km) of new road constructed along the western boundary of Essendon Aerodrome, from the original Lancefield Road alignment north-west of the airport to Treadwell Road, Essendon North
- 1959/60 – Lancefield Road deviation, 1 mile (1.6 km) of new dual-carriageway road constructed along the southern boundary of Essendon Aerodrome, connecting the existing Lancefield Road deviation from Treadwell Road to Sunbury Road (today Bulla Road), Essendon North
- 1963/64 – Lancefield Road duplication, 1.1 miles (1.8 km) from Treadwell Road to north of Vaughan Street, incorporating a junction with a future Calder Freeway
- 1965/66 – Lancefield Road duplication, 0.5 miles (800 m) from Hawker Street to Parer Road.
- 1965/66 – Tullamarine By-pass Road, 1.8 miles (2.9 km) of 4-lane dual-carriageway road completed from Mickleham Road to the "Tullamarine Jetport Terminal area"; at this stage, the airport interchange, bridges and access roads were still under construction.
- 1967/68 – Tullamarine By-pass Road, 4.5 miles (7.2 km) total officially opened to traffic between Tullamarine Airport and Lancefield Road at Essendon Airport.
- 1967/68 – Strathmore By-pass Road, 2 miles (3.2 km) of 4-lane dual-carriageway road from Lancefield Road at Bulla Road linking directly to a 2-level bridged interchange at Bell Street, commenced construction.
- 1970 – Tullamarine Freeway, 11 miles (18 km) opened early 1970, including the 2-mile (3.2 km) Strathmore By-pass Road, 5-mile (8.0 km) Tullamarine By-pass Road, and 3.5-mile (5.6 km) southern extension to Flemington Bridge built by the MMBW. Total cost: $14.94 million.
- 1974 – Tullamarine Freeway, responsibility for southern extension (from Bell Street interchange to Flemington Bridge) constructed by the MMBW transferred to Country Roads Board, 1 July 1974.
- 1979 – Lancefield Road, at-grade intersections eliminated, English Street interchange opened and last remaining 1.6 km upgraded to freeway standard, opened 18 December 1979, by Minister for Transport, the Hon Rob Maclellan MLA, at a cost of $7.8 million.
- 2006 – Tullamarine-Calder Interchange, re-construction of inbound lanes open October 2006.
- 2007 – Tullamarine-Calder Interchange, re-construction of outbound lanes open February 2007; combined with inbound lanes opening 5 months earlier in 2006, total package cost of $150 million.

=== 1969 Melbourne Transportation Plan ===
The freeway was originally designated in the 1969 Melbourne Transportation Plan as the F14 Freeway corridor.

== CityLink–Tulla Widening (2015–2018) ==
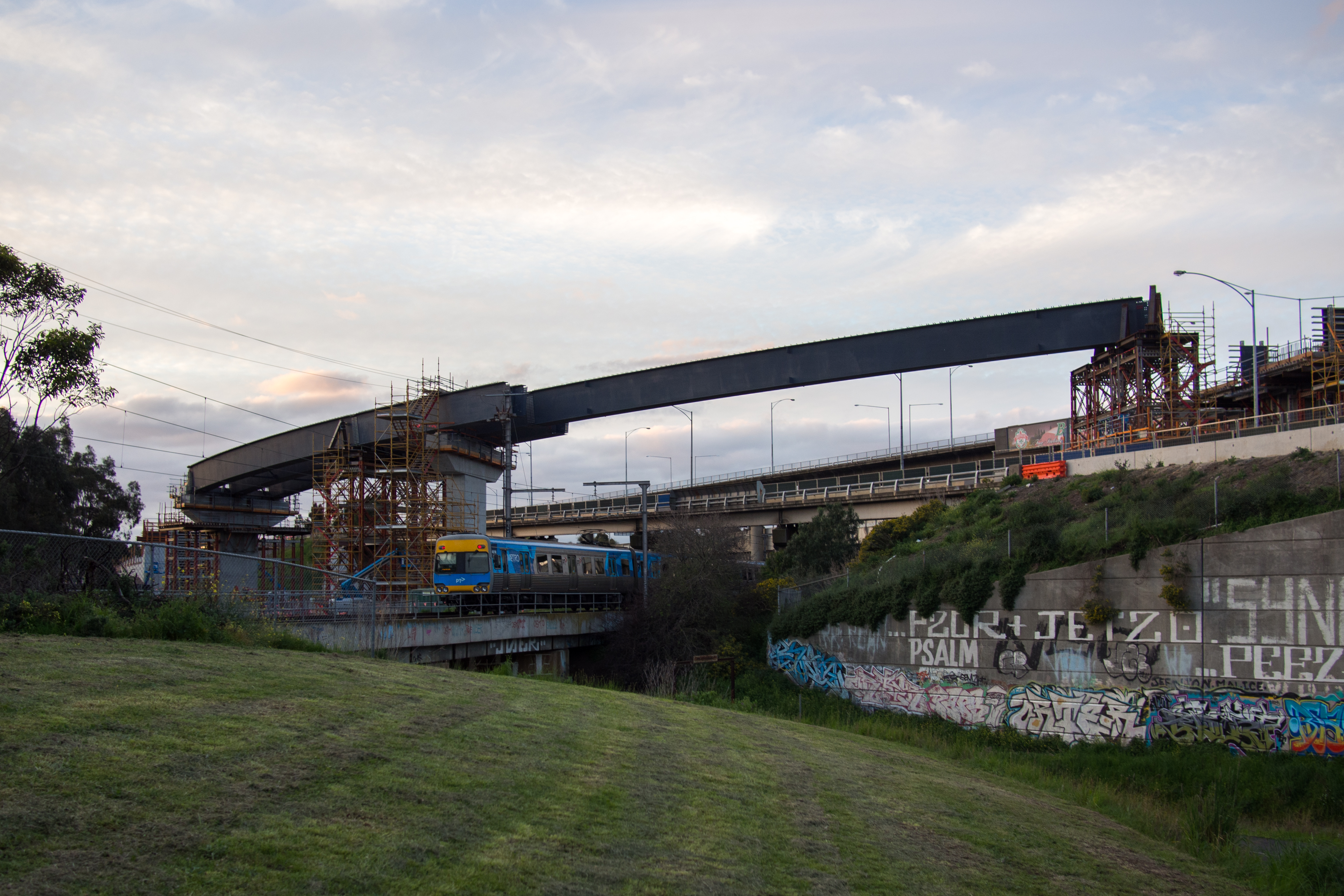
New ramp under construction at Bell Street as part of the CityLink Tulla Widening Project (2016)

=== Project Overview ===
In August 2015 a proposal to Widen the Citylink and Tullamarine Freeway was put in order which consists of 2 Stages which would increase the road's daily capacity as well as shorten trips between Melbourne Airport and The CBD During Morning Peak and Afternoon Peak Times. The following upgrades started in October 2015 (Stage 1) and May 2016 (Stage 2). The entire project was completed in late 2018.

==== Stage 1 (Bulla Road to Power Street) ====
- Lane use management signs to manage which lanes are open
- Variable speed limit signs above all lanes
- Ramp signalling – stop and go traffic lights to improve traffic flow and reduce congestion as traffic enters the freeway from on-ramps
- CCTV cameras – to monitor for incidents, help response times and minimise disruptions
- Travel time information signs so people can plan their journey
- Electronic message signs – to notify road users of planned changes or disruptions
- Automatic incident detection system – to alert Road Managers incidents in real time
- 2 Dedicated Lanes Inbound to Bell Street from the Tullamarine Freeway and Calder Freeway
- New Bell Street to Pascoe Vale Road
- Improvements To Flemington Road/ Mount Alexander Road Freeway Interchange
- Additional Outbound Lane Between Moreland and Ormond Road
- Ramp Widening Between Bolte Bridge and West Gate Freeway
- One Additional Inbound Lane between Montague Street and Ingles Street
- One Additional Inbound Lane between Montague Street and Power Street

==== Stage 2 (Melbourne Airport to Bulla Road) ====
- A new structure with dedicated lanes from the Tullamarine Freeway and Mickleham Road to the M80 Ring Road inbound to ease congestion and reduce traffic weaving
- An extra lane entering the Tullamarine Freeway city bound from Mickleham Road
- Reconstruction and widening of the English Street overpass and all ramps to increase capacity into and out of Essendon Fields
- Ramp signals on the city bound entry from Kings Road in Taylors Lakes to the Tulla Calder interchange to regulate the flow of traffic getting onto the Tullamarine Freeway from the Calder Freeway

==== Extra Lanes ====
Part of The Upgrade is adding more lanes between Melbourne Airport and the West Gate Freeway. Between The Citylink (Western Link) and The West Gate Freeway one additional lane in each direction will be added consuming the emergency lanes as well as lower the speed limit from 100 km/h down to 80 km/h. New Emergency Stopping Bays Similar to the Monash Freeway's Emergency Stopping Bays will be provided where Possible.

== Exits and interchanges ==
LGA	Location	km	mi	Exit	Destinations	Notes
Hume	Melbourne Airport	0	0.0		Sunbury Road (C743 north) – Sunbury	North western freeway terminus: continues as Sunbury Road
Hume	Melbourne Airport	0	0.0		Centre Road – Melbourne Airport	Northbound entry and southbound exit only
Hume	Melbourne Airport	0.95	0.59	19B	Terminal Drive/Melbourne Drive – Melbourne Airport Terminals 1/2/3	Northbound exit and southbound entry only
Hume	Melbourne Airport	1.2	0.75	19A	Naarm Way – Melbourne Airport Terminal 4	Northbound exit only
Hume	Melbourne Airport	1.3– 2.0	0.81– 1.2	18	Mercer Drive, to Airport Drive – Melbourne Airport	Northbound exit and southbound entry only
Hume	Westmeadows–Tullamarine–Gladstone Park tripoint	3.3	2.1	17	Mickleham Road (Metro Routes 39/48 north, Metro Route 39 south) – Tullamarine, Mickleham	
Hume–Merri-bek boundary	Tullamarine–Gladstone Park–Gowanbrae tripoint	5.1	3.2	16	Western Ring Road (M80) – Laverton North, Thomastown	No access north east bound to southbound or northbound to south-westbound
Moonee Valley	Airport West–Strathmore Heights–Essendon Fields tripoint	6.3	3.9	15	Melrose Drive (northwest) – Airport West; Wirraway Road (southeast) – Essendon Airport	No entry northbound; southbound exit to Wirraway Road only
Moonee Valley	Airport West–Essendon Fields boundary	7.5	4.7	14	English Street – Airport West, Essendon Airport	
Moonee Valley	Airport West–Essendon Fields–Niddrie–Essendon North quadripoint	8.6	5.3	13	Calder Freeway (M79) – Bendigo, Avalon Airport	Partial Y interchange: south-eastbound entrance and north west bound exit only
Moonee Valley	Essendon Fields–Essendon North–Strathmore tripoint	9.5	5.9	12	Bulla Road (Metro Route 37 south, unallocated north) – Essendon, Moonee Ponds	
Moonee Valley	Essendon Fields–Essendon North–Strathmore tripoint	9.5	5.9	12	CityLink (M2) – Docklands, Port Melbourne	South-eastern freeway terminus: continues south as CityLink
1.000 mi = 1.609 km; 1.000 km = 0.621 mi: Incomplete access; Route transition

== See also ==
- Freeways in Australia
- Freeways in Melbourne
- Road transport in Victoria
