= Outer Metropolitan Ring Road =

Proposed freeway in Melbourne, Australia

Outer Metropolitan Ring Road Victoria

General information
- Type: Freeway

Major junctions
- North East end: Metropolitan Ring Road; Bundoora, Melbourne
- Hume Freeway; Sunbury Road; Calder Freeway; Melton Highway; Western Freeway
- South West end: Princes Freeway; Cocoroc, Melbourne

Highway system
- Highways in Australia; National Highway • Freeways in Australia; Highways in Victoria

The Outer Metropolitan Ring Road is a proposed freeway in Melbourne, Australia connecting the Hume Freeway at Kalkallo north of Melbourne, to the Princes Freeway south-west of Werribee. The concept was announced as part of the Victorian Transport Plan in November 2008, with planning commenced in late 2007 but not widely publicised until February 2008. While the proposed route and concept designs were released to the public in June 2009 for public comment, construction is not expected to commence until the 2030s or 2040s.

The Outer Metropolitan Ring (OMR) planning study has been established by VicRoads to investigate transport requirements and options for the Werribee – Melton – Tullamarine – Mickleham corridor. It is intended to ultimately provide for an eight lane freeway (four lanes in each direction) together with four rail lines within the median space for interstate freight and high speed passenger trains. Access restoration roads and crossings are included in the proposal.

This concept also included a proposed E6 Transport Corridor from the Hume Freeway at Kalkallo to the Metropolitan Ring Road in Thomastown, as well as another road connection from the Deer Park Bypass to the Outer Metropolitan Ring Road. A study area around Bulla was also identified for a freeway link to Melbourne Airport and the Tullamarine Freeway.
