= M80 Ring Road =

Freeway in Melbourne, Australia

M80 Ring Road Western Ring Road Metropolitan Ring Road Victoria
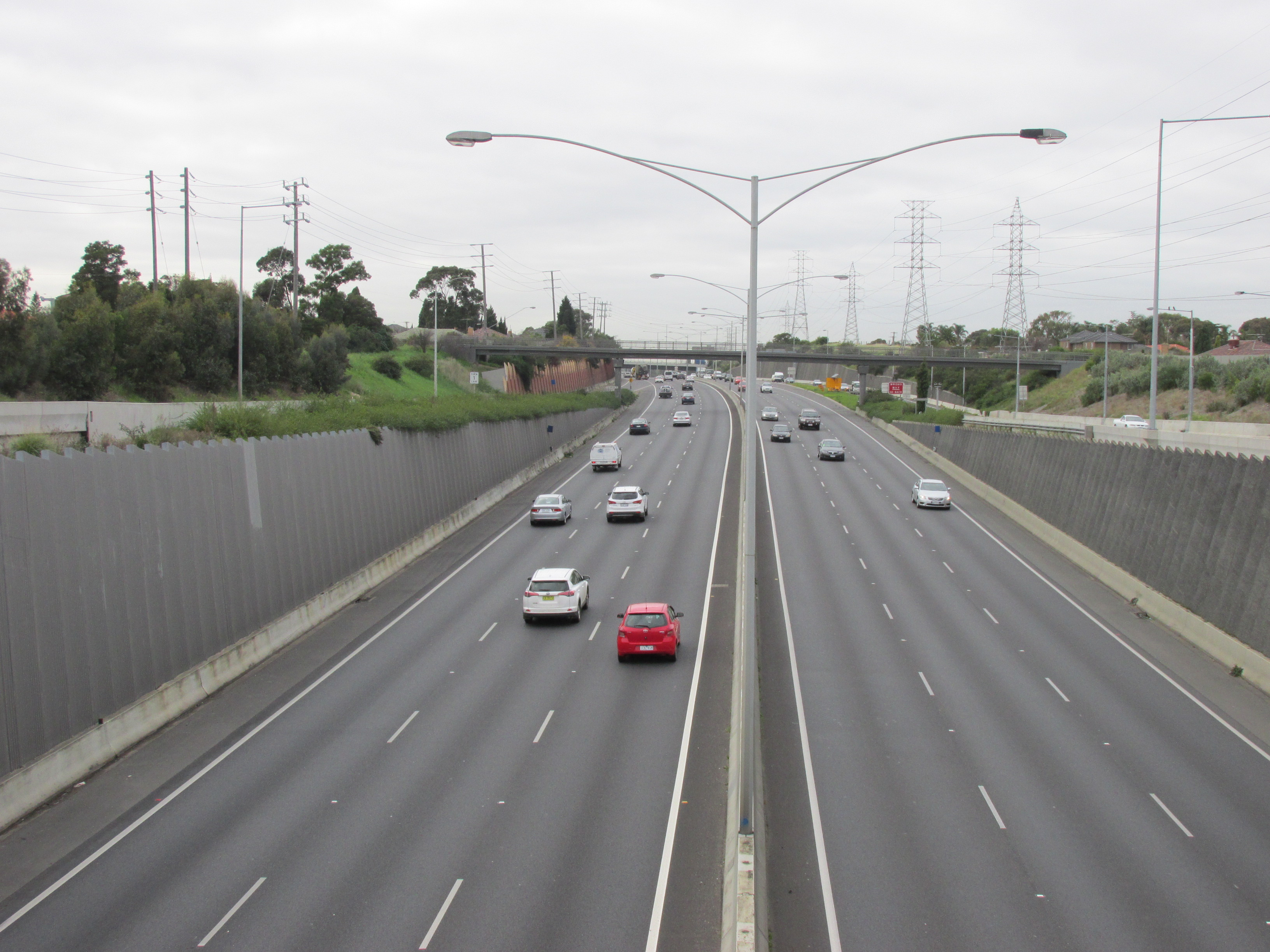
- M80 Ring Road in Fawkner
- Coordinates: 37.827651°S 144.816946°E (Southwest end); 37.694437°S 145.092655°E (Northeast end)

General information
- Type: Freeway
- Length: 38.3 km (24 mi)
- Opened: 1992–1999
- Route number(s): M80 (1997–present)
- Former route number: National Highway M80 (1997–2013) (Sunshine West–Thomastown); Metro Route 80 (1992–1997) (Gowanbrae–Campbellfield); Ring Road 80 (1992) (Tullamarine–Jacana)
- Tourist routes: Tourist Route 21; Ardeer–Laverton North

Major junctions
- Southwest end: Princes Freeway; West Gate Freeway; Laverton North, Melbourne
- Western Freeway; Calder Freeway; Tullamarine Freeway; Hume Freeway
- Northeast end: Greensborough Bypass; Greensborough, Melbourne

Location(s)
- Major suburbs / towns: Sunshine West, Ardeer, St Albans, Keilor East, Keilor Park, Tullamarine, Airport West, Gowanbrae, Campbellfield, Thomastown, Bundoora

Highway system
- Highways in Australia; National Highway • Freeways in Australia; Highways in Victoria

The M80 Ring Road (also known simply as the Ring Road or by the names of its constituent parts; the Western Ring Road and the Metropolitan Ring Road) is a partially complete urban freeway ring road around Melbourne, Australia.

The ring road connects Melbourne's western suburbs and northern suburbs to other Victorian urban and rural freeways (the West Gate and Princes Freeways, Western Freeway, Calder Freeway, Tullamarine Freeway and Hume Freeway), and also relieves freight traffic from Sydney Road, Pascoe Vale Road and Geelong Road. With connections to every major interstate and regional freeway, it has encouraged both industrial and residential growth in Melbourne's western suburbs.

A series of major upgrades along the entire route commenced in 2009, including widening and a Freeway Management System; the most recent section between Sydney and Edgars Roads commenced construction in 2020 and was completed in 2022, one year ahead of schedule.

The North East Link is currently under construction between the Greensborough Bypass, the north-eastern end of the Ring Road, and the Eastern Freeway. Expected to open in 2028, this will create a freeway-standard ring road encircling Melbourne, from Laverton North in the western suburbs to Frankston in the south-eastern suburbs.

== Route ==
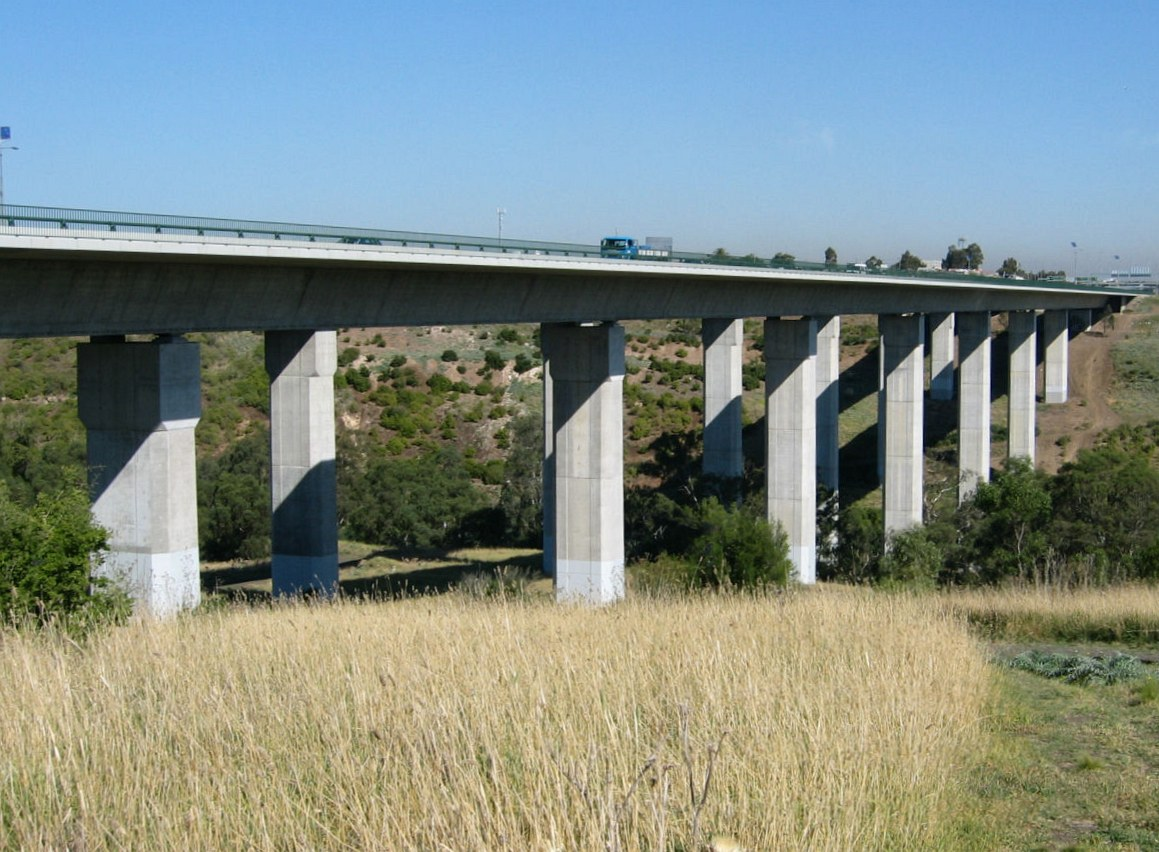
EJ Whitten Bridge

The Western Ring Road officially begins at the West Gate Interchange in Laverton North, with ramps to and from the West Gate Freeway, Princes Freeway and Geelong Road, and heads north as a six-lane dual-carriageway until the Western Freeway/Fitzgerald Road interchange, widening to eight lanes and heading north-east, widening again to ten lanes at the Sunshine Avenue/McIntyre Road interchange and crossing the Maribyrnong River over the EJ Whitten Bridge (named after Australian rules football player Ted Whitten. The freeway narrows to eight lanes at the Calder Freeway interchange, then narrowing further to six lanes at the Dalton Road interchange, and again to four lanes at the Plenty Road interchange, before terminating at the Greensborough Bypass in Greensborough.

The road has a non-peak speed limit of 100 km/h for almost its entire length; between Greensborough Bypass and Plenty Road, the speed limit drops to 80 km/h (formerly 90 km/h before freeway works completed). The Western Ring Road between the Western Highway and the Tullamarine Freeway was previously configured with variable speed limits, which can vary between 60 km/h and 100 km/h depending upon traffic conditions. As of the 2009-2023 upgrades, all upgraded sections now feature a Freeway Management System (similar to the system in place on the M1 corridor) which provide more detailed information to drivers (including variable speed limits) and has replaced the previous variable speed limit system between Ballarat Road (the current name for the previous Western Highway) and the Tullamarine Freeway.

Standard travel time for the M80 Ring Road is 25 minutes (17 minutes on the Western Ring Road and 8 minutes on the Metropolitan Ring Road) in both directions. However, peak period freeway travel times typically vary between 30 and 45 minutes in each direction, unless there are significant incidents, which can stretch travel times from 50 minutes to beyond one hour.

== History ==
The Ring Road project was proposed as part of the 1969 Melbourne Transportation Plan (F3, F5 & F7 Freeway corridors) and has documented in almost every edition of the Melway street directory since that time. Construction of the Western Ring Road began in February 1989 with work on the Broadmeadows section, and was completed with the final link between the Calder and Tullamarine Freeways. Under the Keating government, a total $555 million was provided by the federal government for the Western Ring Road, with a $76 million contribution from the Victorian Government.

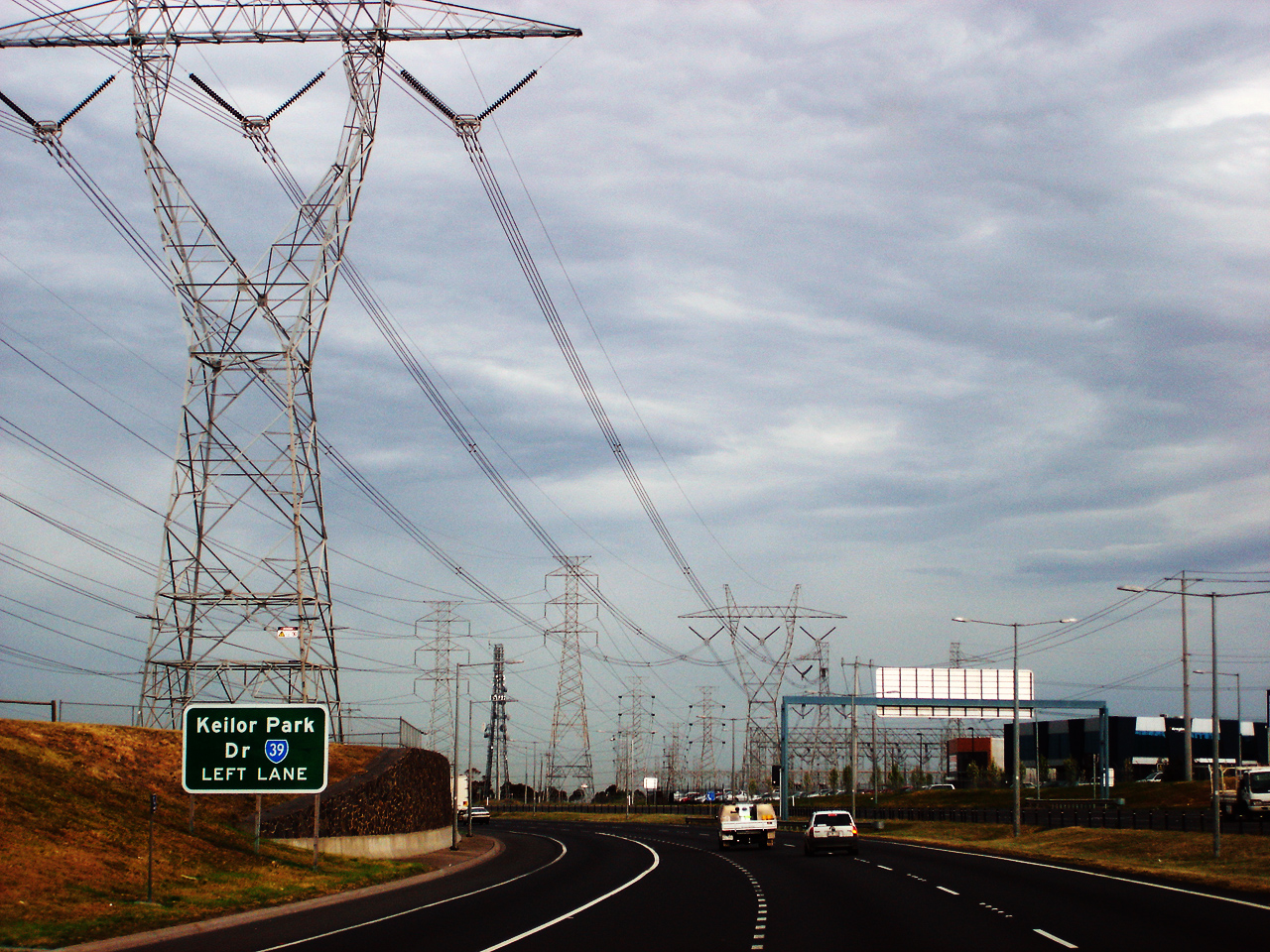
Western Ring Road at Keilor Park

The project is officially divided into two sections:

- Western Ring Road: the section between the West Gate Freeway and Hume Highway (now Sydney Road).
- Metropolitan Ring Road: the section between Hume Highway and Greensborough Bypass. The section between Greenborough Bypass and Plenty Road was originally called Northern Ring Road upon opening in April 1994, but was changed when the Plenty Road to Dalton Road section opened in November 1996, referred to since by VicRoads as the Metropolitan Ring Road.

Completed in stages, the freeway opened to traffic as follows:

- 1992 – Broadmeadows section (Stage 1, Tullamarine Freeway to Pascoe Vale Road), opened to traffic on 20 September 1992.
- 1993 – Broadmeadows section (Stage 2, Pascoe Vale Road to Sydney Road), opened to traffic on 7 July 1993; this section includes the Jacana Tunnel, which won an Excellence Award in the Public Works category awards by the Institution of Engineers Australia.
- 1994 – Greenborough Bypass to Plenty Road, 2.5 km section opened April 1994 (as "Northern Ring Road"), at a cost of $15.5 million.
- 1995 – Maribyrnong section (Ballarat Road to Keilor Park Drive), opened July 1995, with the official opening of EJ Whitten Bridge by Premier of Victoria Jeff Kennett on 18 August 1995.
- 1996 – Ardeer section (Boundary Road to Ballarat Road), opened 6 March 1996.
- 1996 – West Gate/Princes Freeway interchange to Boundary Road, opened October 1996.
- 1996 – Dalton Road to Plenty Road, opened on 28 November 1996, at a cost of $28.8 million.
- 1996 – Keilor Park Drive to Calder Freeway, opened December 1996.
- 1997 – Calder Freeway to Tullamarine Freeway, the final section of the Western Ring Road (from the West Gate/Princes Highway interchange to Hume Highway (now Sydney Road)), opened 5 June 1997.
- 1999 – Sydney Road to Dalton Road, the final 6km section of the Metropolitan Ring Road (from Hume Highway (now Sydney Road) to Greensborough Bypass) opened 20 August 1999, at a cost of $140 million.

The freeway was designated Ring Road 80 when its first stage opened, quickly replaced by Metropolitan Route 80 in 1992, and extended across successive stages as they opened. With Victoria's conversion to the newer alphanumeric system in the late 1990s, this was updated to M80 in 1997 (for the sections not declared a National Highway).

The Whitlam government introduced the federal National Roads Act 1974, where roads declared as a National Highway were still the responsibility of the states for road construction and maintenance, but were fully compensated by the Federal government for money spent on approved projects. As an important connecting road between other National Highways linking to the capitals of New South Wales and South Australia, a portion of the Western Ring Road between the Hume and Western Highways was declared a National Highway in 1993 - parts of which were yet to be built at the time - allowing for direct Federal funding of its construction. Once opened, this section was signed with a National Highway M80 shield, later extended east to the junction with the Hume Freeway when the Craigieburn bypass opened in 2005, and extended south to the junction with the Western Freeway when the Deer Park bypass opened in 2009. It was later changed to a plain route M80 sign in 2013, for continuity with the rest of the freeway and to complement all infrastructure and signage during the 2009 to 2014 upgrade, although old signage still exists and has not yet been replaced.

The passing of the Road Management Act 2004 granted the responsibility of overall management and development of Victoria's major arterial roads to VicRoads: in 2004, VicRoads re-declared Western Ring Road (Freeway #1900) from Laverton North to Hume Highway in Fawkner, and Metropolitan Ring Road (Freeway #1880) from Hume Highway in Fawkner to Greensborough Bypass in Greensborough; however sign-posting (and VicRoads' own Declared Roads website) subsequently state the name changes at the interchange with the Hume Freeway. From the upgrades beginning in 2009 onwards, it has been more common for both sections to be referred to as M80 Ring Road or simply the Ring Road, with newer signage and government websites increasingly reflecting this.

An eastern extension to the Metropolitan Ring Road (the "missing link" to complete the ring road), tunnelling under Greensborough and through the Banyule Flats, to connect to Eastern Freeway at Bulleen, has now started construction as the North East Link project.

A study has been initiated by VicRoads to supplement the Western Ring Road with an Outer Metropolitan Ring Road.

=== 2009–2023 upgrades ===
Initial upgrading and widening works of the Western and Metropolitan Ring Roads was carried out between 2009 and 2014, funded by the Federal Government AusLink 2 program. VicRoads had originally produced an official "M80 Upgrade Website" with links to a newly created site showing video simulations, maps and scheduled traffic disruptions on the freeway, for already- or nearly-completed sections. The website was revamped when Major Road Projects Victoria, established in 2019, took over management of the project.

The entire length of the freeway is being upgraded, within individual sections over a number of years. Initial work started in 2009 and work on some sections were completed in 2014. Along with the $2.25 billion upgrade, is a new 'Freeway Management System' that includes Ramp Signals (Traffic Lights located within on-ramps), overhead lane signs (electronic variable speed limits and lane symbols) & overhead electronic message boards; along with various new CCTV cameras and 'intelligent' sensors underground (to detect freeway congestion for signals). The entire upgrade is being jointly funded by the State and Federal governments, being fully controlled. managed and operated by VicRoads. This is the most major and expensive road upgrade in Victoria, since the M1 (Monash Freeway / Citylink) upgrade was completed in 2007/2008.

In late 2009, construction began on the upgrade and widening of 38 kilometres (24 mi) of the M80 from Princes Freeway at Laverton North to the Greensborough Highway at Greensborough. The first stage involved widening the 9.7 km (6.0 mi) stretch from Calder Freeway to Sydney Road from 6 to 8 lanes, and was completed in May 2013. Construction on the Western Highway to Sunshine Avenue section was completed in August 2013. Construction on the Edgars Road to Plenty Road section was completed in April 2014. Upgrades of the Princes Freeway to Western Freeway section were expected to commence from 2015 onwards as part of the western section of the East West Link, however the project was cancelled with a change of government at the 2014 state election.

In mid 2015 to early 2016, the state and federal governments had announced A$300 million in funding to upgrade the remaining sections along the ring road, previously allocated to the cancelled East West Link road project. Construction on the Sunshine Avenue to Calder Freeway section was completed in September 2018. The upgrade of the Sydney Road to Edgars Road section started construction in 2020 and was completed in May 2022.

=== Remaining upgrades ===
The upgrade of the Plenty Road to Greensborough Highway section will be included as part of the North East Link project, which commenced construction in 2024 and will be completed in 2028.

The Princes Freeway to Western Highway section is the last remaining section to be upgraded, however no funding has been allocated for planning or construction. However, minor upgrades to the Princes Freeway interchange are underway as part of the West Gate Tunnel project, having commenced construction in 2019 and a delayed completion in 2025.

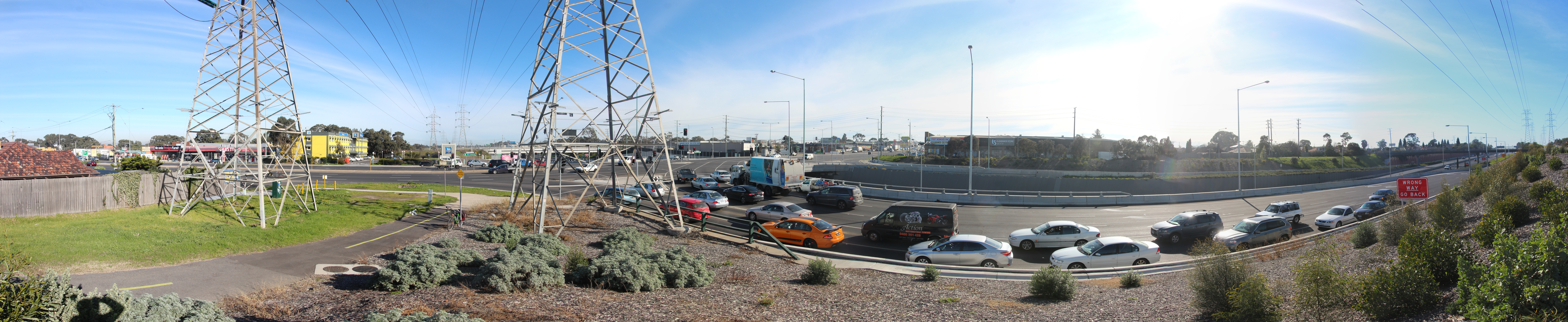
A panorama of the M80 Western ring road eastern off ramp at Sydney Road in Fawkner, Melbourne

=== North East Link ===
Currently, the easternmost point of the Metropolitan Ring Road terminates at Greensborough at the Greensborough Bypass. There have been numerous proposals, most recently the North East Link, to extend it to the Eastern Freeway/Eastlink, and thus complete the "missing link" in a freeway-standard ring road around Melbourne, starting from Laverton North and ending in Frankston. The resulting ring road will be similar to the size and scope of Sydney's Orbital Motorway and would enable traffic to transit between the Hume and Calder Highways and Melbourne's outer east without having to cross Melbourne's inner suburbs.

Once the road is built, it will run through areas that are environmentally and politically sensitive, such as Viewbank, Banyule Flats, Eltham, Templestowe or Warrandyte. An inner-city link to the east was previously considered using the proposed tunnel to connect the Eastern Freeway with Melbourne's west, before its cancellation.

A longer eastern route for the link, which was suggested during planning, would have resulted in existing transmission line corridors being utilised. The official reservation for the extension ends at Ryans Road in Eltham North, but these transmission line corridors could be used to carry the freeway through to Eastlink in Ringwood. Environmental impacts would still be a problem including noise, pollution, possible destruction of vegetation and the interruption of wildlife crossings. A mostly tunnelled road would result in less environmental impacts but would be much more expensive.

In July 2008, it was announced by then Premier John Brumby that the completion of the missing section was again being considered by the Victorian State Government as part of a wider plan to deal with Melbourne's traffic problems. Environmental concerns about building the road through the green wedge and the disruption of communities in the area were raised.

In December 2016, then Premier Daniel Andrews announced plans for extending the freeway. The project was initially estimated to cost at least $10 billion. In May 2016, Infrastructure Victoria released its new consultancy options assessment report, a preferred route was selected in 2017, early construction began in 2020, and major construction began in late 2022, for an expected completion in 2028.

== Purpose ==
Much controversy surrounds the Metropolitan Ring Road project in Melbourne in many different topics including; environmental, economical, social, private & public transportation and both positive and negative aspects are well represented for each topic by many people and groups small and large. This has led to heavy debate in all areas of society in Melbourne from political and media to general public views and conversations.

The road serves various uses:

- integrating the metropolitan area by linking middle and outer suburbs
- assisting circumferential travel through the middle suburbs as opportunities for cross town movement are limited
- linking the growing populations in the south-east and west suburbs to jobs and economic opportunities throughout the metropolitan area
- providing access to Melbourne Airport, the ports of Melbourne and Geelong, and rail freight terminals, from all parts of Melbourne and from across the State
- provide good access to the whole of the Melbourne metropolitan area to and from country Victoria and interstate.

== Exits and interchanges ==
LGA	Location	km	mi	Destinations	Notes
Wyndham	Laverton North	0.0	0.0	West Gate Freeway (M1 east) – City, Dandenong, Pakenham; Princes Freeway (M1/Tourist Route 21 south-west) – Werribee, Geelong, Avalon Airport	Southwestern terminus of freeway and route M80; Tourist Route 21 continues southwest along Princes Freeway
Wyndham–Brimbank boundary	Laverton North–Derrimut–Sunshine West tripoint	1.7	1.1	Boundary Road (Metro Route 32) – Truganina, Sunshine	
Brimbank	Derrimut–Sunshine West boundary	3.0	1.9	7-Eleven service centres	
Brimbank	Derrimut–Sunshine West boundary	4.7	2.9	Western Freeway (M8) – Ballarat, Horsham, Adelaide; Fitzgerald Road – Laverton, Ardeer	
Brimbank	Deer Park–Sunshine West boundary	6.6	4.1	Ararat and Warrnambool railway lines	
Kororoit Creek		7.8	4.8	Bridge (name unknown)	
Brimbank	Deer Park–Cairnlea–Ardeer tripoint	7.9	4.9	Ballarat Road (Metro Route 8) – Deer Park, Sunshine	Northeastern terminus of concurrency with Tourist Route 21
Brimbank	St Albans–Albion–Sunshine North tripoint	10.0	6.2	Sunbury, Swan Hill and Echuca railway lines	
Brimbank	St Albans–Sunshine North boundary	10.7	6.6	Furlong Road – St Albans, Sunshine	
Brimbank	St Albans–Sunshine North–Kealba tripoint	12.3	7.6	McIntyre Road (Metro Route 41 north) – Taylors Lakes; Sunshine Avenue (Metro Route 41 south) – Sunshine	
Maribyrnong River		13.1	8.1	E.J. Whitten Bridge	
Brimbank	Keilor East	14.4	8.9	Keilor Park Drive (Metro Route 39) – Keilor Park, Avondale Heights	Provides northeast-bound exit for westbound entrance to Calder Freeway and for southwest-bound entrance from Calder Freeway eastbound.
Brimbank	Keilor East–Keilor Park boundary	15.9	9.9	Calder Freeway (M79) – City, Bendigo	Northeast-bound exit to and entrance from Calder Freeway eastbound only, southwest-bound exit to and entrance from Calder Freeway westbound only
Brimbank	Tullamarine	17.8	11.1	Airport Drive (west) – Melbourne Airport; Westfield Drive (east) – Airport West	
Hume–Merri-bek boundary	Tullamarine	19.1	11.9	Melrose Drive – Tullamarine, Airport West	Southwest-bound exit and northwest-bound entrance only
Hume–Merri-bek boundary	Tullamarine–Gladstone Park–Gowanbrae tripoint	19.5	12.1	Tullamarine Freeway (M2) – Docklands, Melbourne Airport	No north-eastbound exit to Tullamarine Freeway southbound, no south-westbound entrance from Tullamarine Freeway northbound
Moonee Ponds Creek		21.6	13.4	Bridge (name unknown)	
Hume–Merri-bek boundary	Jacana–Broadmeadows–Glenroy tripoint	22.3	13.9	Pascoe Vale Road (Metro Route 35) – Broadmeadows, Glenroy	Northeast-bound exit and southwest-bound entrance only
Hume–Merri-bek boundary	Broadmeadows–Glenroy boundary	22.4	13.9	Craigieburn, Shepparton, Albury and North East SG railway lines	
Merlynston Creek		24.4	15.2	Bridge (name unknown)	
Hume–Merri-bek boundary	Broadmeadows–Glenroy–Fawkner tripoint	25.9	16.1	Upfield railway line	
Hume–Merri-bek boundary	Fawkner	26.1	16.2	Sydney Road (Metro Route 55) – Craigieburn, Coburg	Single-point urban interchange
Merri Creek		27.4	17.0	Bridge (name unknown)	
Whittlesea	Thomastown	28.5	17.7	Hume Freeway (M31) – Seymour, Sydney	Name change: Western Ring Road (west), Metropolitan Ring Road (east)
Whittlesea	Thomastown	30.0	18.6	Edgars Road – Thomastown, Epping	
Whittlesea	Thomastown	31.0	19.3	Mernda railway line	
Whittlesea	Thomastown	32.4	20.1	Dalton Road – Epping, Reservoir	
Darebin Creek		34.4	21.4	Bridge (name unknown)	
Whittlesea–Banyule boundary	Bundoora	35.8	22.2	Plenty Road (Metro Route 27 south/A51 north) – Bundoora, Whittlesea	
Banyule	Greensborough–Watsonia North boundary	38.3	23.8	Greensborough Bypass (Metro Route 46) – Diamond Creek, Greensborough	Northeastern terminus of freeway and route M80
Banyule	Greensborough–Watsonia North boundary	38.3	23.8	North East Link – Greensborough, Balwyn North	Under construction, expected completion late 2028
1.000 mi = 1.609 km; 1.000 km = 0.621 mi: Concurrency terminus; Incomplete access; Route transition; Unopened

== See also ==
- Freeways in Australia
- Freeways in Melbourne
- Road transport in Victoria
