= Gladstone Park, Victoria =

Gladstone Park
- Suburb
- Interactive map of Gladstone Park
- Coordinates: 37.688°S 144.892°E
- Country: Australia
- State: Victoria
- City: Melbourne
- LGA: City of Hume
- Location: 15 km (9.3 mi) NW of Melbourne; 3 km (1.9 mi) SW of Broadmeadows

Government
  - State electorate: Sunbury
  - Federal division: Maribyrnong

Area
  - Total: 3.7 km^{2} (1.4 sq mi)
- Elevation: 112 m (367 ft)

Population
  - Total: 8,213 (2021 census)
  - Density: 2,220/km^{2} (5,750/sq mi)
- Postcode: 3043
Suburbs around Gladstone Park
Westmeadows; Attwood	Westmeadows	Broadmeadows
Tullamarine	Gladstone Park	Jacana
Tullamarine	Gowanbrae	Glenroy

Gladstone Park is a suburb in Melbourne, Victoria, Australia, 15 km (9.3 mi) north-west of Melbourne's central business district, located within the City of Hume local government area. Gladstone Park recorded a population of 8,213 at the 2021 census.

Gladstone Park is bounded by the Tullamarine Freeway and Mickleham Road to the west, Broadmeadows Road to the north, the Jacana Valley to the east and the Western Ring Road to the south.

== History ==
The Broadmeadows district was originally home to the Wurundjeri nation of Indigenous Australians. European settlement of the area now known as Gladstone Park began in the 1840s, with the land used for agriculture. The modern suburb is named after Thomas Gladstone, who was a local land owner in the 1800s. Development of the residential suburb began in the 1960s as an estate of Tullamarine. Most of the homes in the suburb were built between 1972 and 1975, as a typical part of (then) Melbourne's outer suburban expansion. The post office was opened on 4 February 1985, as the suburb developed.

Carl Williams was shot in the stomach by Jason Moran at a small park in Barrington Crescent in 1999, in one of the early events of the Melbourne gangland killings.

== Demographics ==
In the 2016 census, there were 8,338 people in Gladstone Park. 60.4% of people were born in Australia. The next most common countries of birth were Italy 3.6%, India 2.6%, Lebanon 2.1%, Sri Lanka 2.0% and England 1.8%. 59.6% of people spoke only English at home. Other languages spoken at home included Arabic 7.6%, Italian 5.5%, Greek 3.6%, Turkish 2.4% and Assyrian Neo-Aramaic 1.5%. The most common responses for religion were Catholic 38.5% and No Religion 18.2%.

== Community Facilities ==
=== Gladstone Park Community Centre ===
The Gladstone Park Community Centre is located on South Circular Road, and hosts a number of community bodies, such as the basketball club and mothers' groups. It is located adjacent to the Meadow Park Eagles soccer clubrooms.

=== Gladstone Park Secondary College Library ===
The high school contains a public library which is part of the Hume Libraries network.

=== Gladstone Park Shopping Centre ===
Gladstone Park Shopping Centre is a minor shopping centre. It contains the suburb's post office as well as a Commonwealth Bank branch and Westpac ATM, and numerous major real estate offices, along with medical and health services and other professional services. As well as the major stores, there are a number of minor stores and a food court.

== Parks ==
=== Elmhurst Park ===
Elmhurst Park is named after Elmhurst Road, where it is located. The park contains two playgrounds, a bike track, a small skate park and picnic facilities with barbecues. The Gladstone Park Tennis Club is located next to the park.

=== Gladstone Park Reserve ===
Gladstone Park Reserve is located on South Circular Road. The park contains a playground, and is connected to the Gladstone Park Secondary College oval via a gate in the south-east corner. It is the home ground of the Meadow Park Eagles, and is adjacent to the Gladstone Park Primary School. Sporting facilities include a synthetic cricket pitch and a soccer pitch and goals.

=== Gladstone Park Secondary College grounds ===
The Gladstone Park Secondary College has large sports grounds which are open to public use. Sporting facilities include a football oval, soccer pitch, two concrete cricket nets, three concrete basketball/netball courts and a concrete hockey/futsal pitch.

=== Jacana Valley ===
The Jacana Valley marks the eastern boundary of Gladstone Park. The Moonee Ponds Creek flows through the valley, and there is and extensive wetlands reserve. The Moonee Ponds Creek Trail follows the creek through the park.

=== Jack Ginifer Reserve ===
Jack Ginifer Reserve is named after a former Member of Parliament. It is located on Carrick Drive, opposite the Gladstone Views Primary School. The Gladstone Park Cricket Club is based at 'Ginifer', and it has a temporary turf wicket during the summer, and football goals. Being adjacent to the Jacana Valley, Jack Ginifer Reserve gives wide views of neighbouring suburbs.

=== Other parks ===
There are numerous other small parks and reserves in Gladstone Park. These include:

- Barrington Crescent Reserve, containing a playground.
- Belmont Place
- Carrick – Elmhurst Reserve, containing the Uniting Church and Bowls Club.
- Carrick Reserve
- Clarke Drive Reserve
- Fairbank Avenue Reserve, containing a playground.
- Harcourt Crescent Reserve, containing a playground.
- John Coutts Reserve
- Snaefell Walkway
- Trentham Reserve, containing a playground and barbecue facilities.
- Vaucluse Drive Reserve, containing a playground.

== Places of worship ==
=== Good Shepherd Catholic Church ===
The Good Shepherd Catholic Church is located on South Circular Road, and incorporates the School of the Good Shepherd. The Church opened in 1975. The previous parish church built was demolished in mid-2008, having reached a stage where it was beyond repair. The new church was modelled on St. Ambrose Church on Sydney Road, Brunswick, and built from Mount Gambier limestone. Construction was completed May 2010. Archbishop Denis Hart consecrated The Good Shepherd Gladstone Park/Greenvale church in the presence of 1000 parishioners.

=== Gladstone Park Uniting Church ===
The Gladstone Park Uniting Church is located on the corner of Carrick Drive and Elmhurst Road. It was formed in 1983 when the Tullamarine Methodist Church, Westmeadows Presbyterian Church and the Gladstone Park Uniting Church merged. The current church building opened in 1990 and retains the windows from the Tullamarine church, and the bell from the Westmeadows church.

== Schools ==
=== Gladstone Park Secondary College ===
The Gladstone Park Secondary College (GPSC) was founded in 1970 and is one of the largest schools in the local area, with roughly 1500 students. The GPSC has close relations with local primary schools of the area. It is located on Taylor Drive, next to the Gladstone Park Primary School.

=== Gladstone Park Primary School ===
The Gladstone Park Primary School (GPPS) was founded in 1970. The school has enrolments of between 350 and 400 students. Facilities of GPPS include a gym and artificial sports fields. Located on Taylor Drive, GPPS is next to the Gladstone Park Secondary College.

=== Gladstone Views Primary School ===
The Gladstone Views Primary School (GVPS) was founded in 1976. Taking in students from grades Prep to Six, the GVPS has roughly 330 students. The school is located on Carrick Drive and boasts a full sized basketball stadium.

=== School of the Good Shepherd ===
The School of the Good Shepherd is a Catholic primary school which had its first intake in 1975. Located on South Circular Road next to the Catholic Church of the Good Shepherd, it has roughly 250 students.

== Sport ==
=== Gladstone Park Basketball Club ===
The Gladstone Park 'Power' play its games at the Gladstone Park Community Centre on South Circular Road. It competes in the Broadmeadows Basketball Association Junior Competitions, with teams from Under 8 to Under 19. Its colours are light blue, dark blue and white.

=== Gladstone Park Bowls Club ===
The Gladstone Park Bowls Club was founded in 1990. It is based at the Carrick – Elmhurst Reserve, on Carrick Drive.

=== Gladstone Park Cricket Club ===
The Gladstone Park Cricket Club first played during the 1978/79 season. Currently playing in the North West Cricket Association, the club plays its home games at Ginifer Reserve on Carrick Drive. Nicknamed the 'Burras', the club's colours are navy blue and red. The club won the senior Luscombe Shield in 1993/94 and 2005/2006.

=== Gladstone Park Tennis Club ===
The Gladstone Park Tennis Club was founded in 1968. It has nine synthetic clay courts. It is based at Elmhurst Park.

=== Meadow Park Soccer Club ===
The Meadow Park 'Eagles' was founded in 1975 as a Junior club, with seniors beginning in 1983. The Eagles play in the Men's State League 5 North Division. The club plays its home games at the Gladstone Park Reserve on South Circular Road. It also has Junior Boys and Girls teams as well as Senior Women's. The club's colours are navy blue and gold vertical stripes, having started in brown and gold.

== Transport ==
=== Bus ===
Four bus routes service Gladstone Park:

- 477 : Moonee Ponds Junction – Broadmeadows station via Essendon, Airport West and Gladstone Park. Operated by CDC Melbourne.
- SmartBus 901 : Frankston station – Melbourne Airport. Operated by Kinetic Melbourne.
- SmartBus 902 : Chelsea station – Airport West. Operated by Kinetic Melbourne.
- Night Bus 959 : Melbourne CBD (Queen Street) – Broadmeadows station via Niddrie and Airport West (operates Saturday and Sunday mornings only). Operated by Ventura Bus Lines.

=== Train ===
Broadmeadows railway station, on the Craigieburn line, is the nearest railway station to Gladstone Park.

=== Tram ===
The nearest tram route to Gladstone Park is located approximately 3 km (1.9 mi) south, in Airport West:

- : Westfield Airport West – Flinders Street station (Elizabeth Street Melbourne CBD). Operated by Yarra Trams.

=== Third Melbourne Airport runway controversy ===
In December 2013, the Melbourne Airport masterplan was approved in principle. A new third runway will expose most of Gladstone Park to aircraft noise.

== See also ==
- City of Broadmeadows – Gladstone Park was previously within this former local government area.
