= Greensborough Highway =

Highway in Melbourne, Australia

Greensborough Highway (numerous constituent roads) Victoria
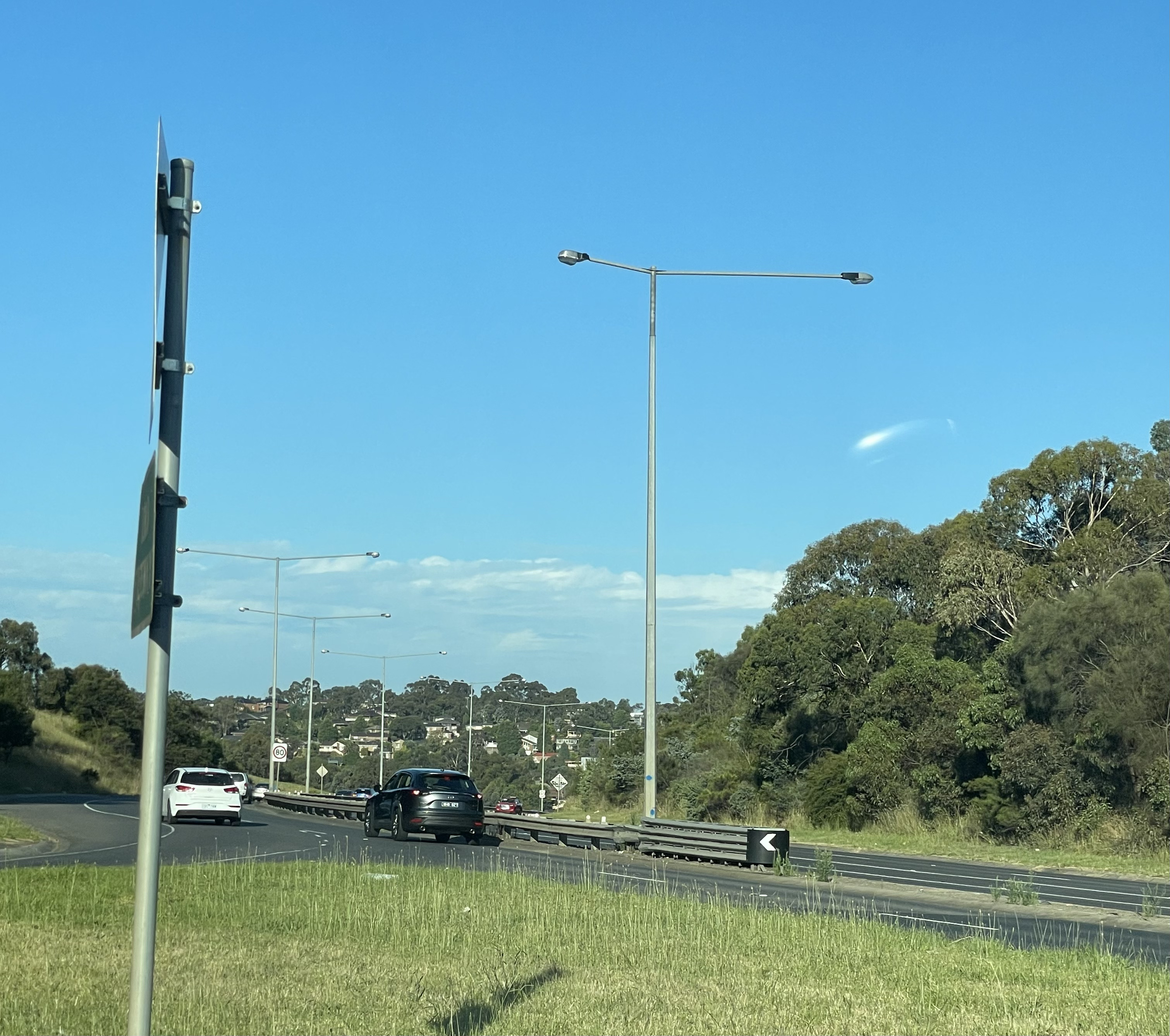
- Looking northeast at the intersection of Greensborough Bypass and Metropolitan Ring Road
- Coordinates: 37.759728°S 145.069049°E (South end); 37.689126°S 145.113359°E (North end)

General information
- Type: Highway
- Length: 9.7 km (6.0 mi)
- Gazetted: March 1914 (as Main Road); 1989 (as State Highway)
- Route number(s): M47 (2026–present) (Greensborough); Metro Route 44 (1965–present) (Ivanhoe–Rosanna); Metro Route 46 (1965–present) (Yallambie–Greensborough)

Major junctions
- South end: Lower Heidelberg Road; Heidelberg, Melbourne
- Banksia Street: Lower Plenty Road; Grimshaw Street; Metropolitan Ring Road
- North end: Diamond Creek Road; Greensborough, Melbourne

Location(s)
- Major settlements: Rosanna, Yallambie, Watsonia

Highway system
- Highways in Australia; National Highway • Freeways in Australia; Highways in Victoria

Greensborough Highway is a highway in the north-eastern suburbs of Melbourne, Australia, and is an important route for north-east Melbourne. This name is not widely known to most drivers, as the entire allocation is still best known as by the names of its constituent parts: Lower Heidelberg Road, Rosanna Road, Lower Plenty Road, Greensborough Road and Greensborough Bypass. This article will deal with the entire length of the corridor for sake of completion.

== Route ==
Greensborough Highway commences at the intersection of Lower Heidelberg Road and Banksia Street at Heidelberg and heads north as a four-lane, single carriageway road as Lower Heidelberg Road, nearly immediately crossing Burgundy Street and changing name to Rosanna Road, and continues north to Rosanna, where it intersects with and changes name to Lower Plenty Road and widens to a six-lane, dual-carriageway road. It continues north-east, where after a short distance it intersects with and changes name to Greensborough Road, heading north as a four-lane, single-carriageway road until it meets Watsonia Road in Watsonia, changing names to Greensborough Bypass and continues north-east as a six-lane, dual-carriageway road, crossing Grimshaw Street and turning east at the intersection with Metropolitan Ring Road in Greensborough before eventually ending at the roundabout with Diamond Creek Road and Civic Drive.

== History ==
Within Victoria, the passing of the Country Roads Act 1912 through the Parliament of Victoria provided for the establishment of the Country Roads Board (later VicRoads) and their ability to declare Main Roads, taking responsibility for the management, construction and care of the state's major roads from local municipalities. Main Heidelberg-Eltham Road was declared a Main Road along Rosanna and Lower Plenty Roads from Heidelberg to Rosanna (the declaration continues west along Lower Heidelberg and Heidelberg Roads to Merri Creek in Clifton Hill, and east along Lower Plenty and Main Roads to Eltham).

Lower Heidelberg Road and Rosanna Road were signed as Metropolitan Route 44 between Ivanhoe and Yallambie in 1965; Greensborough Road was also signed as Metropolitan Route 46 in 1965, originally turning east along Grimshaw Street to run through Greensborough and along Diamond Creek Road east beyond it. When the Greensborough Bypass was opened in the late 1980s, Metropolitan Route 46 was re-aligned along it to bypass Greensborough and re-join Diamond Creek Road beyond.

In the late 1980s, the northern section of Greensborough Road south of Grimshaw Street was extended and significantly altered, with the original road north of Lenola Street in Macleod re-aligned to the west as a service road, the new road being a divided highway up to a new intersection at Grimshaw Street. North of here the road was extended as a single carriageway bypass road, sweeping north-west around central Greensborough and terminating at a large roundabout interchange with Diamond Creek Road and Civic Drive, known locally (and sign-posted) as the Greensborough Bypass. The original alignment north of Nepean Street was repurposed for local traffic only, still known today as Greensborough Road. Construction on the northern half, the 3 km section between Grimshaw Street and Diamond Creek Road, started in 1985 and opened in March 1988; construction on the southern half, the 2 km section between Grimshaw and Lenola Streets, started in late 1985, and opened in September 1989.

The passing of the Transport Act 1983 (itself an evolution from the original Highways and Vehicles Act 1924) provided for the declaration of State Highways, roads two-thirds financed by the state government through the Road Construction Authority (later VicRoads). State Highway (Greensborough Bypass), from Grimshaw Street to Diamond Creek Road, was declared a State Highway a year after it opened in 1989; this was replaced the following year with the declaration of Greensborough Highway as a State Highway in December 1990, from Banksia Street in Heidelberg to Diamond Creek Road in Greensborough, subsuming the original declaration of Main Heidelberg-Eltham Road as a Main Road between Heidelberg and Rosanna; however the road was still presently known (and signposted) as its constituent parts.

Throughout the 1990s the Metropolitan Ring Road was constructed, terminating at the Greensborough Bypass section of the highway. Around this time, the road north of Grimshaw Street was progressively widened and duplicated, with the final section being a new bridge over the Plenty River, completed in 2005.

The passing of the Road Management Act 2004 granted the responsibility of overall management and development of Victoria's major arterial roads to VicRoads: in 2004, VicRoads re-declared the road as Greensborough Highway (Arterial #6850), from Banksia Street in Heidelberg to Heidelberg-Kinglake Road (known as Diamond Creek Road) in Greensborough; as before, the road is still presently known (and signposted) as its constituent parts.

=== Timeline of construction ===
- 1988: Northern section of Greensborough Bypass, initial 3.5 km of dual-lane, single-carriageway road from Grimshaw Street to Diamond Creek Road, opened 1 March 1988.
- 1989: Southern section of Greensborough Bypass, 2 km of dual-carriageway road from Grimshaw Street to Yallambie Road, opened September 1989.
- 1998: Greensborough Bypass duplication, 1.3 km north of Grimshaw Street to Metropolitan Ring Road (including bridge over Kempston Street and provision of additional lane east of Plenty River).
- 2005: Greensborough Bypass duplication, 1.8 km Metropolitan Ring Road to Diamond Creek Road, including duplication of Plenty River bridge.

=== 1969 Melbourne Transportation Plan ===
The route was originally designated in the 1969 Melbourne Transportation Plan as the F18 Freeway, extending further than Diamond Creek Road to finish at Ryans Road, Diamond Creek, and at the southern end extending past Lower Plenty Rd to link up with Eastern Freeway between Bulleen Road and Burke Road, via the Banyule Flats Reserve.

== Future upgrades ==
In recent years, Greensborough Highway has become extremely congested, with sections of the road carrying upwards of 60,000 vehicles per day. The road is one of the only major arterials that connects the north eastern suburbs with Eastern Freeway (and by extension the Melbourne CBD), with sections of Greensborough Road and Rosanna Road carrying unsustainable amounts of traffic as well as a significant number of trucks within residential areas. The North East Link project, announced in 2016, aims to fix these problems by creating a freeway-grade connection and road tunnels between the Metropolitan Ring Road and Eastern Freeway in Bulleen, aiming to take vehicles off Greensborough Highway and also involves significant reworking of the northern section of the route. The project began in late 2020 with the tunnels scheduled to begin construction in 2024, and the entire project is anticipated to be completed in 2028.

== Major intersections ==
LGA	Location	km	mi	Destinations	Notes
Banyule	Heidelberg–Eaglemont boundary	0.0	0.0	Lower Heidelberg Road (Metro Route 44) – Ivanhoe, Clifton Hill	Southern terminus of highway Metro Route 44 continues south along Lower Heidelberg Road
Banyule	Heidelberg–Eaglemont boundary	0.0	0.0	Banksia Street (Metro Route 40) – Coburg, Doncaster, Springvale	
Banyule	Heidelberg	0.4	0.25	Burgundry Street – Heidelberg	Northern end of Lower Heidelberg Road; Southern end of Rosanna Road
Banyule	Rosanna	2.6	1.6	Lower Plenty Road (Metro Route 46 west) – Rosanna, Heidelberg Heights	Concurrency of Metro Routes 44 and 46
Banyule	Rosanna–Yallambie boundary	3.0	1.9	Lower Plenty Road (Metro Route 44 east) – Eltham, Kangaroo Ground	Concurrency of Metro Routes 44 and 46
Banyule	Watsonia	5.3	3.3	Watsonia Road – Watsonia North	Northern end of Greensborough Road; Southern end of Greensborough Bypass
Banyule	Watsonia–Watsonia North–Greensborough tripoint	6.7	4.2	Grimshaw Street (Metro Route 48) – Broadmeadows, Bundoora, Eltham	
Banyule–Nillumbik boundary	Watsonia North–Greensborough boundary	7.7	4.8	Metropolitan Ring Road (M80) – Thomastown, Laverton North, Melbourne Airport	
Banyule–Nillumbik boundary	Watsonia North–Greensborough boundary	7.7	4.8	North East Link – Bulleen	Under construction, expected completion 2028
Plenty River		8.4	5.2	Bridge (no known name)	
Banyule–Nillumbik boundary	Greensborough	9.7	6.0	Civic Drive (west) – Greensborough	
Banyule–Nillumbik boundary	Greensborough	9.7	6.0	Diamond Creek Road (Metro Route 46 northeast, unallocated south) – Diamond Creek, Hurstbridge	Northern terminus of highway at roundabout Northern end of Greensborough Bypass; Metro Route 46 continues northeast along Diamond Creek Road
1.000 mi = 1.609 km; 1.000 km = 0.621 mi: Concurrency terminus; Route transition; Unopened

== See also ==
- List of Melbourne highways
