= Derrimut =

- Suburb
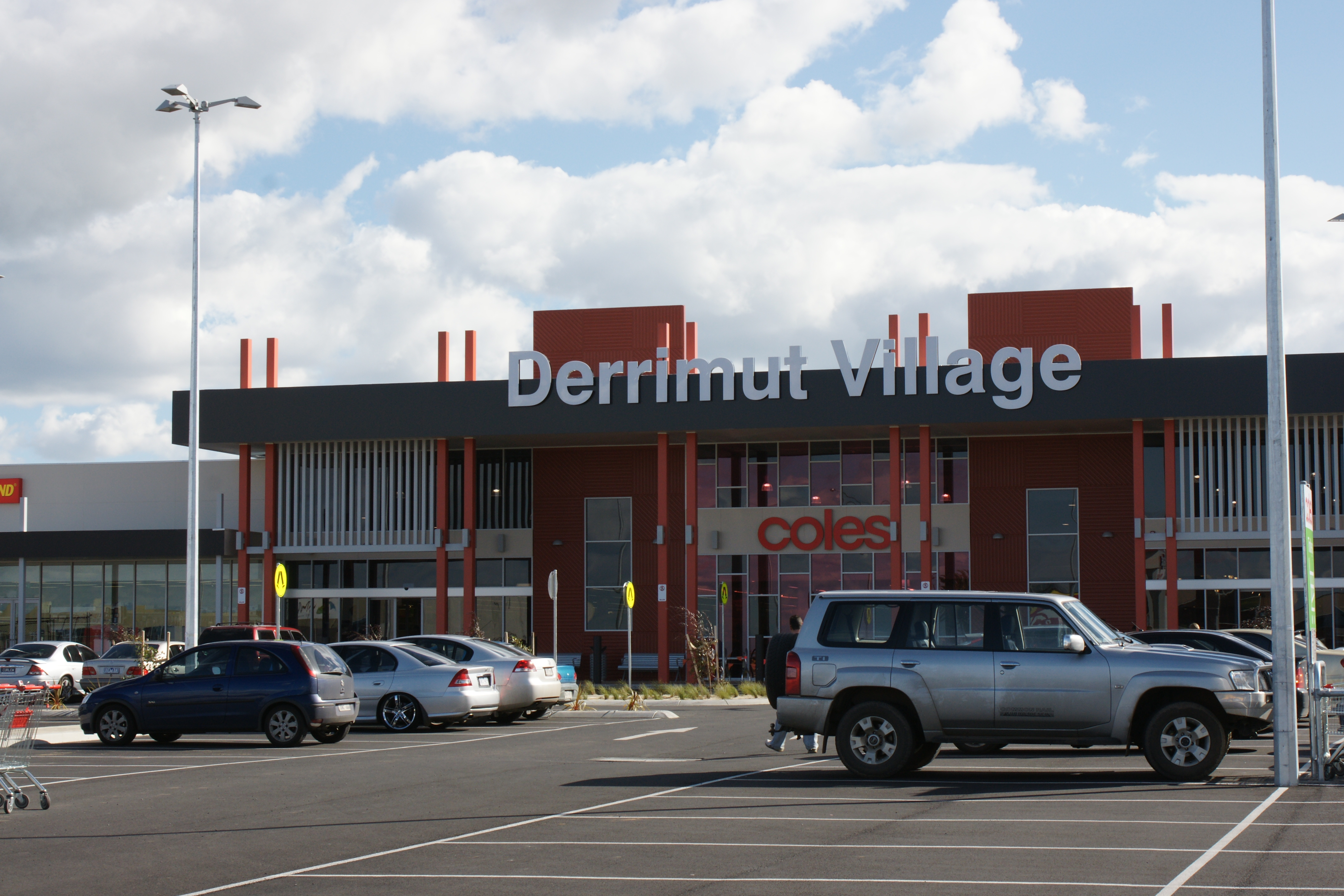
- Derrimut Village

- Interactive map of Derrimut
- Coordinates: 37.795°S 144.766°E
- Country: Australia
- State: Victoria
- City: Melbourne
- LGA: City of Brimbank
- Location: 17 km (11 mi) from Melbourne

Government
  - State electorate: Kororoit
  - Federal divisions: Fraser; Gorton

Area
  - Total: 13 km^{2} (5.0 sq mi)

Population
  - Total: 8,651 (2021 census)
  - Density: 665/km^{2} (1,720/sq mi)
- Postcode: 3026
Suburbs around Derrimut
Ravenhall	Deer Park	Sunshine West
Ravenhall	Derrimut	Sunshine West
Truganina	Laverton North	Laverton North

Derrimut (/ˈdɛrɪmət/ DERR-im-ət) is a suburb in Melbourne, Victoria, Australia, 17 km (11 mi) west of Melbourne's Central Business District, located within the City of Brimbank Local government area. Derrimut recorded a population of 8,651 at the 2021 census.

Derrimut is a newly developed suburb in Melbourne. It is named after Derrimut, a nineteenth-century Aboriginal Elder. Derrimut is bounded by Foleys Road to the north, Robinsons Road to the west, the Western Ring Road to the east and Boundary Road to the south. Derrimut was once part of Deer Park, but was detached from the latter in 1998.

== History ==
Derrimut is located on the lands of the Wurundjeri Woi-wurrung people, of the Kulin Nation.

Derrimut Post Office opened on 1 June 1866 in the rural area, but closed in 1918.

The area was home to the Mount Derrimut field station, a major agricultural teaching and research facility operated by the University of Melbourne's Faculty of Agriculture, from 1964 to 1996. The site was also used by the Victoria University Western Institute to deliver courses in the late 1980s and early 1990s. Before being used by the university, it was used by ICI (now Orica) for training and conference purposes. The site is now occupied by the Mt Derrimut Golf & Community Club, formerly the Sunshine Golf Club which moved to Derrimut in November 2007.

On 10 July 2023, a chemical explosion started a fire at the ACB Group factory on Swann Drive. The explosion resulted in one of Victoria's biggest fires in recent years. The fire left one worker dead.

== Facilities ==
=== Education ===
Derrimut has a government primary school named Derrimut Primary School and a Catholic primary school named St Lawrence Primary School.

=== Transportation ===
Mt Derrimut Rd on State Route 40 runs through the middle of the suburb. Additionally, the Deer Park Bypass which runs through the suburb allows access to the Western Freeway and the Western Ring Road.

Derrimut does not have a train station. The station in closest proximity to Derrimut is Deer Park station on the Ararat line.

Public Transport Victoria operates one bus route with stops in Derrimut:

- 400 from Sunshine Station to Laverton Station via Robinsons Road

=== Shopping ===
Derrimut Village Shopping Centre is the main shopping precinct in the area. The centre has more than 18 retailers. The shopping centre underwent an expansion in 2020.

== See also ==
- City of Sunshine – Derrimut was previously within this former local government area.
- Electoral district of Derrimut
