= Watsonia North =

- Suburb
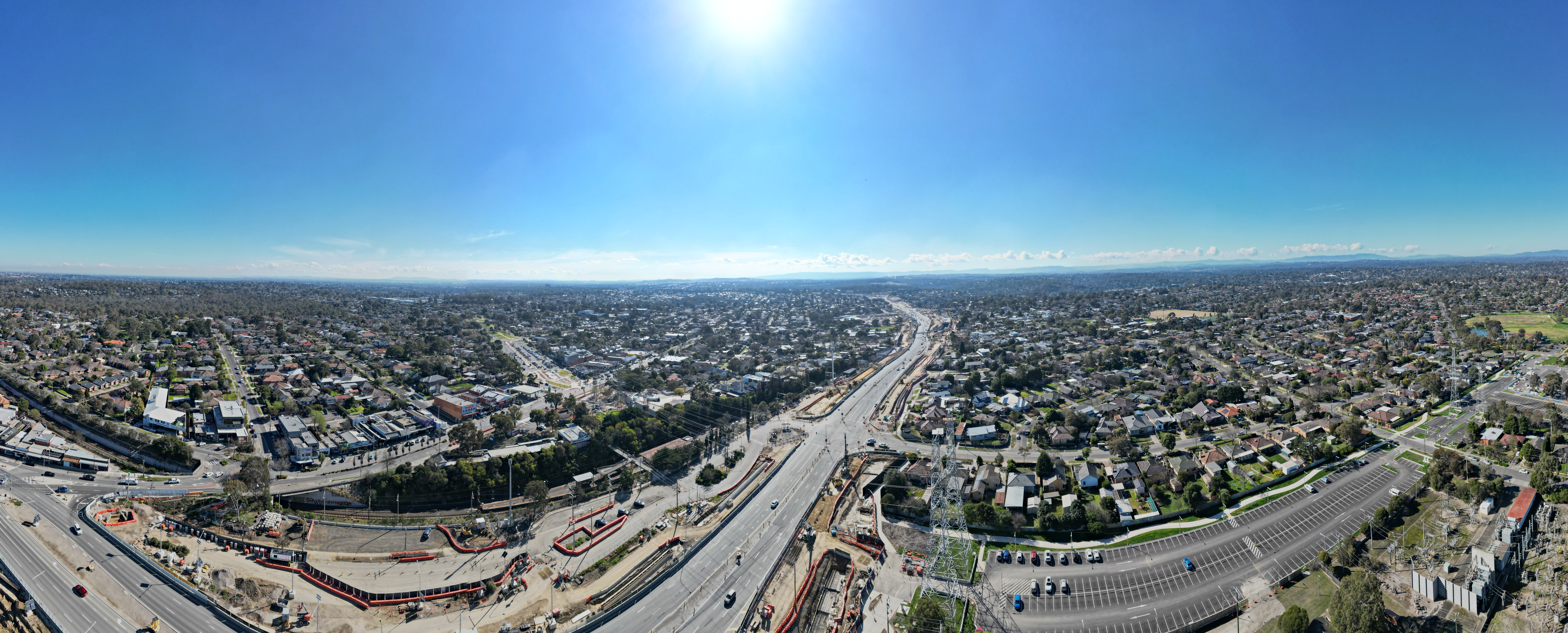

- Interactive map of Watsonia North
- Coordinates: 37.700°S 145.081°E
- Country: Australia
- State: Victoria
- City: Melbourne
- LGA: City of Banyule
- Location: 20 km (12 mi) from Melbourne

Government
  - State electorate: Bundoora
  - Federal division: Jagajaga

Area
  - Total: 1.4 km^{2} (0.54 sq mi)

Population
  - Total: 3,799 (2021 census)
  - Density: 2,710/km^{2} (7,030/sq mi)
- Postcode: 3087
Suburbs around Watsonia North
	Bundoora
Bundoora	Watsonia North	Greensborough
	Watsonia

Watsonia North is a suburb of Melbourne, Victoria, Australia, 17 km north-east of Melbourne's Central Business District, located within the City of Banyule local government area. Watsonia North recorded a population of 3,799 at the 2021 census. In 2022 Watsonia North has emerged as Australia’s most tightly held suburb, with homeowners hanging onto their houses for more than 23 years on average before selling.

The Watsonia Military Camp existed during WWII and was then handed over to the State Housing Commission for emergency housing.

Watsonia North was previously in the Shire of Diamond Valley.

Watsonia North is home to Binnak Park stretching from the north to the south of the suburb, from Cameron Parade to Binnak Drive.

Watsonia North is bounded in the west generally to the west of Binnak Park, in the north by the Metropolitan Ring Road, in the east by the Greensborough Highway and in the south by Grimshaw Street.

Part of the residential area of Watsonia North was once owned by the Christian Brothers of Parade College until the early 1980s.

Public Library facilities are provided by Yarra Plenty Regional Library. The nearest library is located at Watsonia

== Notable people ==
- Matthew Kreuzer, the number one draft pick in the 2007 Australian Football League National draft is a resident of Watsonia North.

== See also ==
- Shire of Diamond Valley – Watsonia North was previously within this former local government area.
