= Gowanbrae =

- Suburb
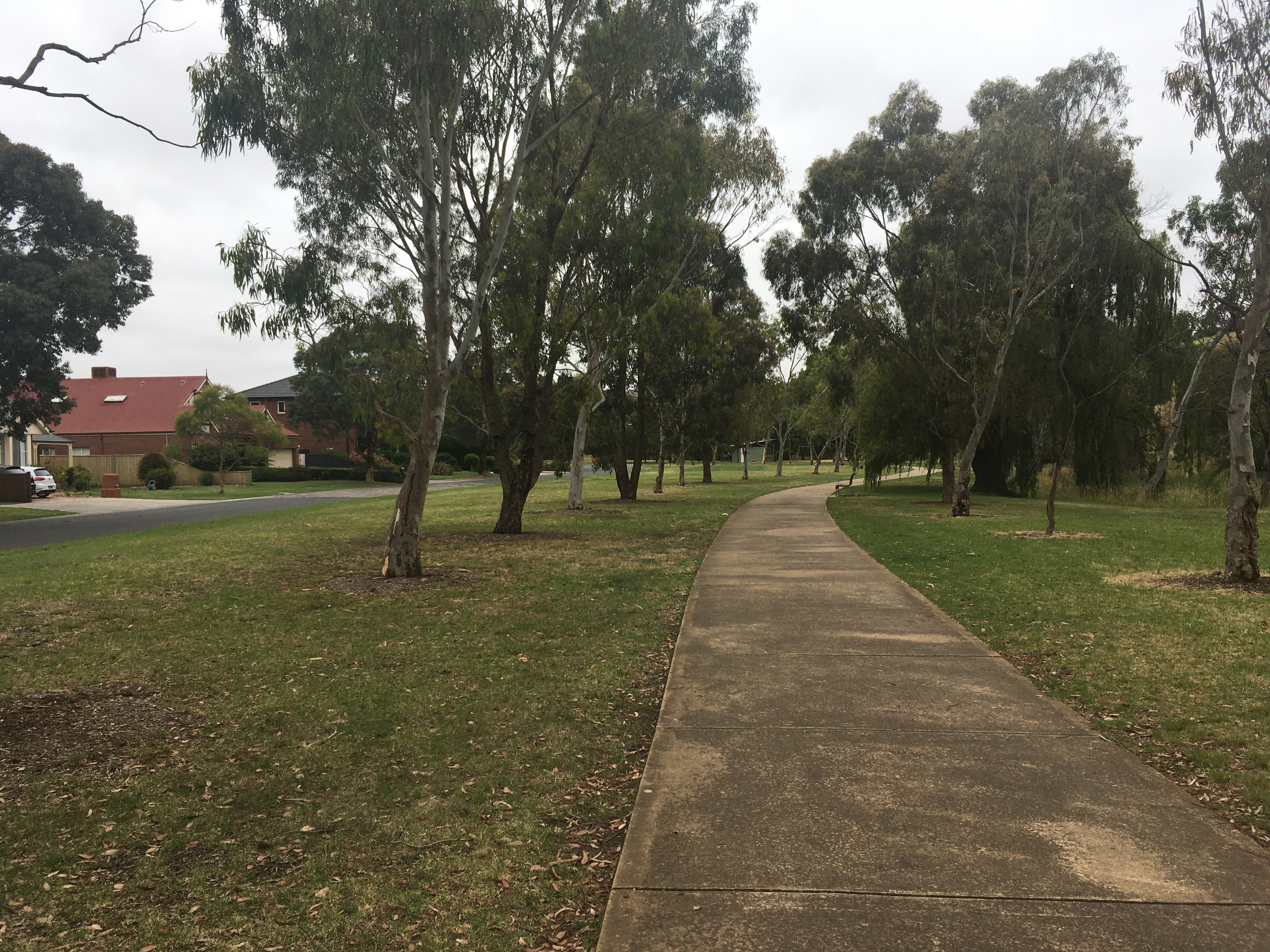
- Moonee Ponds Creek Trail, Gowanbrae

- Interactive map of Gowanbrae
- Coordinates: 37.702°S 144.899°E
- Country: Australia
- State: Victoria
- City: Melbourne
- LGA: City of Merri-bek
- Location: 13 km (8.1 mi) NW of Melbourne
- Established: 1990s

Government
  - State electorate: Niddrie
  - Federal division: Maribyrnong

Area
  - Total: 1.3 km^{2} (0.50 sq mi)
- Elevation: 97 m (318 ft)

Population
  - Total: 3,000 (2021 census)
  - Density: 2,300/km^{2} (6,000/sq mi)
- Postcode: 3043
Suburbs around Gowanbrae
Tullamarine	Gladstone Park	Glenroy
	Gowanbrae
Airport West	Strathmore Heights

Gowanbrae is a suburb in Melbourne, Victoria, Australia, 13 km (8.1 mi) north-west of Melbourne's Central Business District, located within the City of Merri-bek local government area. Gowanbrae recorded a population of 2,971 at the 2021 census.

Gowanbrae is bounded by the Western Ring Road in the north and west, the Tullamarine Freeway in the west, the Albion-Jacana railway line in the south and Moonee Ponds Creek in the east. It is the City of Merri-bek's newest suburb, with residential development started in the 1990s and continuing.

== Demographics ==
According to data from the 2016 census:

- The most common ancestries in Gowanbrae were Australian 18.3%, English 17.6%, Italian 14.1%, Irish 7.9% and Scottish 4.7%.
- In Gowanbrae, 72.0% of people were born in Australia. The most common countries of birth were Fiji 2.0%, Italy 1.9%, Sri Lanka 1.9%, India 1.5% and China (excludes SARs and Taiwan) 1.4%.
- The most common responses for religion in Gowanbrae were Catholic 41.5%, No Religion, so described 21.2%, Anglican 7.3%, Not stated 7.0% and Eastern Orthodox 4.6%. In Gowanbrae, Christianity was the largest religious group reported overall (67.3%) (this figure excludes not stated responses).
- In Gowanbrae, 67.9% of people only spoke English at home. Other languages spoken at home included Italian 5.7%, Sinhalese 2.2%, Greek 2.0%, Hindi 2.0% and Mandarin 1.7%.
- Gowanbrae could be described as a high income young family suburb with moderate cultural diversity. About one third of citizens in Gowanbrae were born overseas and a high proportion of citizens speak a language other than English at home. There is a high level of religious affiliation in Gowanbrae, with three quarters of citizens proclaiming themselves Christians. In 2001, 400 residents were living in Gowanbrae in about 135 dwellings.

Gowanbrae has a strong and active residents group and website and Facebook page named 'Gowanbrae'. The suburb has a $4 million community and children's centre with views of the city of Melbourne. There is also a yearly festival which is attended by most of the residents.

== Transport ==
=== Bus ===
One bus route services Gowanbrae:

- 490 : Westfield Airport West – Gowanbrae via Melrose Drive and Gowanbrae Drive. Operated by CDC Melbourne. The bus route operates as a demand responsive transport service inside the suburb itself. Introduced in July 2008, no public transport had previously operated in the suburb.

=== Cycling ===
The Moonee Ponds Creek Trail and the Western Ring Road Trail provide facilities for recreational and commuting cyclists.

=== Road ===
The sole road access to the suburb is from the west via Coventry Street, which passes under the Tullamarine Freeway.

=== Train ===
There are no railway stations in Gowanbrae, with Broadmeadows, Jacana and Glenroy stations, all on the Craigieburn line, the nearest stations. The Albion-Jacana railway line forms Gowanbrae's southern border, and is primarily a freight only line, with NSW TrainLink's XPT service to Sydney and V/Line's North East service to Albury the only passenger services on the line.

=== Tram ===
The nearest tram route to Gowanbrae is located in nearby Airport West:

- : Westfield Airport West – Flinders Street station (Elizabeth Street Melbourne CBD). Operated by Yarra Trams.
