= Tullamarine =

- Suburb
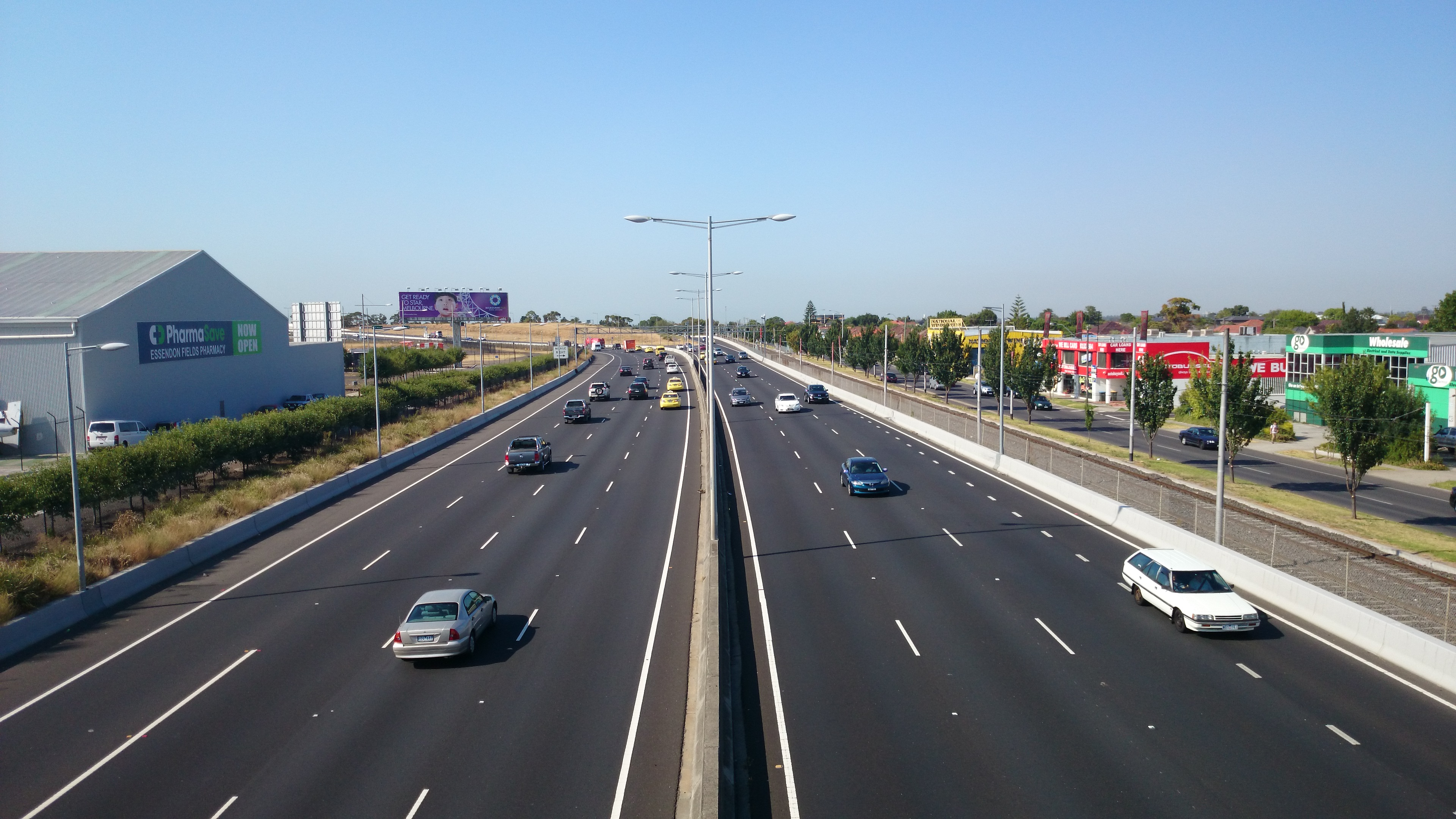
- Tullamarine Freeway

- Interactive map of Tullamarine
- Coordinates: 37.701°S 144.876°E
- Country: Australia
- State: Victoria
- City: Melbourne
- LGAs: City of Brimbank; City of Hume; City of Merri-bek
- Location: 14 km (8.7 mi) NW of Melbourne

Government
  - State electorates: Niddrie; Sunbury
  - Federal divisions: Maribyrnong; Hawke

Area
  - Total: 6.9 km^{2} (2.7 sq mi)
- Elevation: 86 m (282 ft)

Population
  - Total: 6,733 (2021 census)
  - Density: 976/km^{2} (2,527/sq mi)
- Postcode: 3043
Suburbs around Tullamarine
Melbourne Airport	Gladstone Park	Gladstone Park
Keilor	Tullamarine	Gowanbrae
Keilor Park	Airport West	Strathmore Heights

Tullamarine (/ˌtʌləməˈriːn/ TUL-ə-mə-REEN) is a suburb in Melbourne, Victoria, Australia, 14 km (8.7 mi) north-west of Melbourne's Central Business District, located within the Cities of Brimbank, Hume and Merri-bek local government areas. Tullamarine recorded a population of 6,733 at the 2021 census.

The suburb is a collection of recent housing estates and light industry. Generally flat and exposed to the hot northerly winds of Melbourne's summer, as well as cold southerly winds in winter, its most notable feature is the nearby Melbourne Airport. Tullamarine's residential area is contained in a circular loop of the Moonee Ponds Creek, and its western boundary is the Melbourne Airport. Tullamarine contains the smaller residential area of Gladstone Park. The Albion-Jacana railway line separates Tullamarine from Airport West to the south.

== History ==
=== Etymology ===
There are three theories concerning the origins of the placename. It may derive from Tullamareena, a Wurundjeri clan member who in 1838 burnt down the bark hut there where he was imprisoned. Secondly, according to Reverend George Langhorne, Tullamareena was a boy's name he supplied to the first government surveyor, Robert Hoddle when the latter asked him for native names to apply in the districts. A third possibility is that it was an indigenous word for a native flower found in forests, and also a boy's name, both mentioned in an early poem by Richard Howitt.

=== 19th century ===
Tullamarine Village was on Bulla or Lancefield Road, which is now Melrose Drive. It was positioned at the intersection of three municipal boundaries (Broadmeadows, Bulla and Keilor), which came together at Victoria Street and Melrose Drive. The primary school was on land now in the airport (south of Victoria Street) and the post office was near the present-day Tullamarine Reserve. Originally Tullamarine extended westwards to the Organ Pipes National Park, and the nearby area bounded by the Maribyrnong River, Jacksons Creek and Deep Creek was called Tullamarine Island because of the difficulties faced by inhabitants in getting across the watercourses during wet weather.

When the land in the Tullamarine Parish was subdivided into farm lots in 1842 only one lot sold, and the rest were sold by selection in 1850. A Wesleyan school was opened in 1855 and two other schools in 1859 and 1864. The Wesleyan one continued until the State primary school was opened in 1884. Tullamarine Post Office opened on 4 March 1859. By 1865 Tullamarine had a hotel and a district population of about 200 persons.

Section 1 of the parish of Tullamarine was just over the river from Keilor. Its most noted occupants were Edward Wilson, editor of The Argus, and an acclimatation enthusiast, and Robert McDougall, a famed breeder of the Booth strain of Shorthorns. Section 2, Annandale, gave Annandale Road its name. Its most noted occupant was Bill Parr. Section 3 was granted to William Foster and became known as the Springs. His younger brother J.F.L.Foster took it, and section 21 Doutta Galla (south of Sharps Road) over later while he was acting Governor and the homestead on 21DG was called the Governor's House by locals. Section 21 became James Sharp's "Hillside" and the Crotty family's dairy farm called Broomfield. The southern part of Section 3 became the Reddans' "Brightview" and Tommy Loft's "Dalkeith". The Wesleyan School was near the bend in Cherie Street and the Methodist Church was on the south corner of Post office Lane at the northern boundary of Section 3. Also on Section 3 was the Junction Hotel.

Between Broadmeadows-Mickleham Rd and the Moonee Moonee Ponds was section 4, the southern half of which became E. E. Kenny's "Camp Hill" because diggers bound for the goldfields camped on his property. Eventually the part west of Bulla Rd (Melrose Drive) was sold off and became (Samuel) Mansfield's Triangle. The northern half of section 4 became Edmond Dunn's "Viewpoint". It was between Mickleham Road and the creek, north of Camp Hill Park to the Lackenheath Drive corner. North of Viewpoint was "Stewarton" whose occupant (1846–1855) was Peter McCracken, who later had a dairy in Kensington and built Ardmillan in Moonee Ponds. He was followed by John Kerr and, from 1892, by John Cock. A later prominent owner was Jim Barrow who had the first tractor in the district. Stewarton was renamed Gladstone and now, with Viewpoint, comprises the 1,014 acres (4.10 km^{2}) of Gladstone Park.

On the west side of Broadmeadows Road (now Mickleham Road) was section 6. This and section 15 (north to the Westmeadows Football Ground) were granted to John Carre Riddell, after whom Riddells Creek was named. The land from Freight Road to the creek was a 450 acres (1.8 km^{2}) farm called Chandos (after which a street was named in nearby Attwood) but in the early 1900s John Cock divided it into three farms; from the north, Judd's Chandos, Lockhart's 198 acres (0.80 km^{2}) "Springburn" and Wright's "Strathconnan".

Section 7 was to the west and was granted to John Pascoe Fawkner. As Bulla Road bisected sections 6 and 7, Fawkner and Riddell swapped land so that Fawkner's was now to the south west and Riddell's to the north east. Fawkner divided his land into 7 acres (28,000 m^{2}) blocks to enable his beloved yeoman farmers to obtain a block. James Henry Parr consolidated many of the blocks to form his farm "The Elms". Nearer to Grants Lane was the Loves' dairy farm. Riddell's land became Wallace Wright's "Sunnyside" (later Heaps) and Charles Nash's "Fairview". The area bounded by Derby Street as far north of Springbank was called Hamilton Terrace after Riddell's partner and subdivided into acre blocks. At the suggestion of Alec Rasmussen, the Tullamarine Progress Association bought Noah Holland's 6 acres and donated what is now called Tullamarine Reserve to Broadmeadows Shire in late 1929. A triangular part of section 15, now containing the airport terminal, later became the Paynes' "Scone".

Most of the airport is now on Section 14, "Gowrie Park", owned by the Ritchies of Aucholzie, James Lane and Donovan during most of the years until airport acquisitions began. Gowrie Park Drive recalls this farm. Section 8, east of McNabs Road and south of Grants Lane, was granted to John Grant and the McNabs. Grant's farm, the northern half, was called "Seafield" and the McNabs had two farms, Victoria Bank and Oakbank but the middle farm was absorbed into Oakbank. The two families are credited with introducing Ayrshire cattle into Australia. The Seafield School was where the runway crosses the line of Grants Lane.

Across McNabs Road was Fox's Barbiston and on the North of Barbiston Road, the McNabs' second Victoria Bank (later owned by journalist Cornelius Percy Blom) and the Ritchies' Aucholzie. On both sides of Mansfields Road were farms owned by the descendants of David Mansfield. North of these farms was "Glenara" owned by Alister Clark, the breeder of the Black Rose and first Chairman of the Moonee Valley Racing Club until his death.

The three great leaders in Tullamarine's history were Alec Rasmussen, Major Murphy and Leo Dineen. The Spring Street Reserve was renamed after Leo because of his efforts to establish various sporting clubs and facilities. Alec Rasmussen was responsible for the progress association purchasing the Melrose Drive Reserve and donating it to Council. Walter Murphy moved two war memorials and Ann Greene's church as well as leading fire-risk-lessening burn offs (sources below).

The Tullamarine Methodist Church (just north of Trade Park Drive) was built in 1870 and managed to reach its centenary plus about two decades. Its stained glass windows were incorporated into the Uniting Church in Carrick Drive, Gladstone Park. Tullamarine State School 2613 was on the north corner of Conders Lane (Link Rd) but was relocated onto "Dalkeith" circa 1961 and given a new number. The Progress Association was formed in 1924 at a meeting convened by Tom Loft of Dalkeith (See The Argus 19 8 1924 page 13.). Tennis was played at the Johnson's Glendewar (east of the Airport Terminal buildings) until they moved to Cumberland (See The Argus 23 7 1914, page 4.). An application to play Sunday tennis at Tullamarine (Argus 1 9 1939 page 15) was refused but there is no evidence in newspapers of organised tennis apart from the above. By the 1930s, there was less demand for hay so pig farmers such as Heaps, Lacy and Payne (on the Airport Terminal site) became more common.

=== 20th century ===
By the 1930s the Tullamarine Village also had a church, tennis and football clubs and a progress association. The chief activities were hay production and grazing. During the mid-1950s Tullamarine Village became an agricultural and residential township. Later in that decade the Federal Government announced that it was examining a site north and west of the township for a new airport, and land acquisition began in the early 1960s. The school was moved to a new site in 1961.

In 1955 the Village Drive-In was opened with one screen and a capacity of 862 Cars. The drive-in closed in 1984 and the site was developed into a housing estate with streets named after famous film studios such as Forum and Paramount.

Between 1967 and 1970 Tullamarine Freeway was built, dividing Tullamarine from its eastern area, which is Gladstone Park. The part west of the freeway has housing, a large industrial estate and is skirted by the Western Ring Road with interchanges where it crosses the freeway.

In 1988, Anthony Rowhead of F.A.C. developed a scheme to rename roadways within the airport after aborigines, and pioneers of Tullamarine and aviation. It was fully developed when it was cancelled at the last moment with no reason given, with Gowrie Park Drive the only named road. It was named after the farm owned by James Lane in the 1920s when it was used as a landing ground by those daring young men who would visit the Inverness Hotel (near the north end of the runway). When Donovans had the farm during World War II, planes were parked there overnight in case a bombing raid struck Essendon Aerodrome.

=== 21st century ===
Sharps Road, which runs east–west near the southern border of Tullamarine, was until the late 1980s a single carriageway road. On its southern side was a line of tall pine trees hiding a small pony club. Today, Sharps Road is a dual-carriageway road running adjacent to the Western Ring Road to Melbourne Airport.

In 1987 the median house price in Tullamarine was 97% of the median for metropolitan Melbourne, and in 1996 it was 82% of the metropolitan median.

== Demographics ==
According to data from the 2016 census:

- The most common ancestries in Tullamarine were English 16.6%, Australian 16.6%, Italian 11.0%, Irish 6.5% and Greek 4.6%.
- In Tullamarine, 58.9% of people were born in Australia. The most common countries of birth were India 3.9%, Italy 3.7%, Greece 2.0%, New Zealand 2.0% and Lebanon 1.6%.
- The most common responses for religion in Tullamarine were Catholic 36.7%, No Religion, so described 19.4%, Not stated 9.7%, Eastern Orthodox 6.9% and Anglican 6.4%. In Tullamarine, Christianity was the largest religious group reported overall (68.1%) (this figure excludes not stated response).
- In Tullamarine, 59.7% of people only spoke English at home. Other languages spoken at home included Italian 6.1%, Greek 4.1%, Arabic 3.8%, Assyrian Neo-Aramaic 1.7% and Maltese 1.2%.

Tullamarine had census populations of 82 (1891), 190 (1921), 204 (1947), 385 (1955), 1,666 (1966) and 6,605 (2016).

== Geography ==
=== Climate ===
Tullamarine's climate is generally the same as Melbourne CBD's, but is slightly drier and the nights a bit cooler due to its inland location.

Climate data for Melbourne Airport
Month	Jan	Feb	Mar	Apr	May	Jun	Jul	Aug	Sep	Oct	Nov	Dec	Year
Record high °C (°F)	46.0 (114.8)	46.8 (116.2)	40.8 (105.4)	34.5 (94.1)	27.0 (80.6)	21.8 (71.2)	22.7 (72.9)	25.6 (78.1)	30.2 (86.4)	36.0 (96.8)	41.6 (106.9)	44.6 (112.3)	46.8 (116.2)
Mean daily maximum °C (°F)	26.6 (79.9)	26.7 (80.1)	24.3 (75.7)	20.4 (68.7)	16.7 (62.1)	13.7 (56.7)	13.1 (55.6)	14.4 (57.9)	16.7 (62.1)	19.5 (67.1)	22.1 (71.8)	24.6 (76.3)	19.9 (67.8)
Mean daily minimum °C (°F)	13.9 (57.0)	14.2 (57.6)	12.8 (55.0)	10.2 (50.4)	8.3 (46.9)	6.2 (43.2)	5.4 (41.7)	5.9 (42.6)	7.1 (44.8)	8.5 (47.3)	10.4 (50.7)	12.1 (53.8)	9.6 (49.3)
Record low °C (°F)	6.0 (42.8)	4.8 (40.6)	3.7 (38.7)	1.2 (34.2)	0.6 (33.1)	−0.9 (30.4)	−2.5 (27.5)	−2.5 (27.5)	−1.1 (30.0)	1.0 (33.8)	0.9 (33.6)	3.5 (38.3)	−2.5 (27.5)
Average precipitation mm (inches)	40.0 (1.57)	41.2 (1.62)	36.2 (1.43)	43.0 (1.69)	39.4 (1.55)	40.3 (1.59)	35.5 (1.40)	43.8 (1.72)	46.6 (1.83)	53.0 (2.09)	62.0 (2.44)	51.8 (2.04)	534.9 (21.06)
Average precipitation days	8.2	6.8	8.9	10.1	12.5	13.4	14.0	15.4	14.0	13.1	11.5	9.7	137.6
Average relative humidity (%)	44	44	47	52	60	67	65	59	56	52	49	45	53
Mean monthly sunshine hours	272.8	231.7	226.3	183.0	142.6	120.0	136.4	167.4	186.0	226.3	225.0	263.5	2,381

== Economy ==
As there is an industrial area located in the suburb and its proximity to the state's largest airport, a handful of global aerospace businesses have local offices located here.

OzJet's head office was in Tullamarine until it ceased operations in 2012.

Melbourne newspaper The Age had its Print Centre facility in Tullamarine; an iconic building which, in the early 2000s, cost $220 million to develop and which was sold in 2015 to Zagame Automotive for $16 million.

The head office of Schweppes Australia is located on Beverage Drive.

The URBNSURF Melbourne adventure sports theme park is located at 309 Melrose Drive.

== Transport ==
=== Road ===
There are various roads that run through Tullamarine, linking to residential homes, motorways, the city and both Melbourne and Essendon Airport's.

=== Public transport ===
==== Train ====
The nearest railway stations to Tullamarine are Essendon, Broadmeadows and Jacana, all on the Craigieburn line.

==== Bus ====
Six bus routes service Tullamarine:

- 477 : Moonee Ponds Junction – Broadmeadows station via Essendon, Airport West and Gladstone Park. Operated by CDC Melbourne.
- 478 : Westfield Airport West – Melbourne Airport via Melrose Drive. Operated by CDC Melbourne.
- 479 : Westfield Airport West – Sunbury station via Melbourne Airport. Operated by CDC Melbourne.
- 482 : Westfield Airport West – Melbourne Airport via South Centre Road (peak hour only). Operated by CDC Melbourne.
- SmartBus 902 : Chelsea station – Westfield Airport West. Operated by Kinetic Melbourne.
- Night Bus 959 : Melbourne CBD (Queen Street) – Broadmeadows station via Niddrie and Airport West (operates Saturday and Sunday mornings only). Operated by Ventura Bus Lines.

== Sports ==
=== Australian rules football ===
Tullamarine has one football club, the Tullamarine Demons, who are competing in the Essendon District Football League. The club was formed in 1974 as a result of a merger between two existing Essendon District Football League clubs: Essendon Baptist St John's and Ascot Vale Presbyterians, and became known as Essendon-Tullamarine. In 1981, it changed its name to Tullamarine Football Club. It is situated at the Leo Dineen Reserve in Spring Street, Tullamarine.

The Hangar, the training ground and administrative headquarters of Australian Football League team Essendon Football Club since 2013 is in Tullamarine.

=== Cricket ===
The Tullamarine Cricket Club (TCC) was formed in the season of 1968/69 and is situated at the Spring Street Reserve, and affiliated with the North West Cricket Association. It is a relatively young club with over one hundred members that are either players or social members.

=== Soccer ===
The Tullamarine Jets FC Soccer Club was formed in 2005 but moved to its current home ground, Tullamarine Reserve, on Melrose Drive, in 2008. The club has approximately 100 members, either playing or social, and fields the City of Hume's only open age Women's team. The club is affiliated with Football Federation Victoria and had its most successful season in 2009 with its First, Seconds and Under 18's all winning runners up flags.

=== Tennis ===
The Tullamarine Tennis Club has approximately 200 members and caters the needs of both social and competition players. Non-members are also welcome to the club. Competitions available to members include Pennant, Juniors and Seniors. It has six synthetic grass courts, a clubroom with bath/shower, kitchen facilities, and an undercover barbecue area used for social and tennis events.

=== Horse racing ===
A horse by the name of Tullamarine took part in the 1988 Grand National at Aintree in England. His odds of 200/1 were justified when he fell at the first fence.

=== Netball ===
Tullamarine Demons Netball Club.

== See also ==
- City of Broadmeadows – Parts of Tullamarine were previously within this former local government area.
- City of Keilor – Parts of Tullamarine were previously within this former local government area.
