= Essendon Fields =

- Suburb
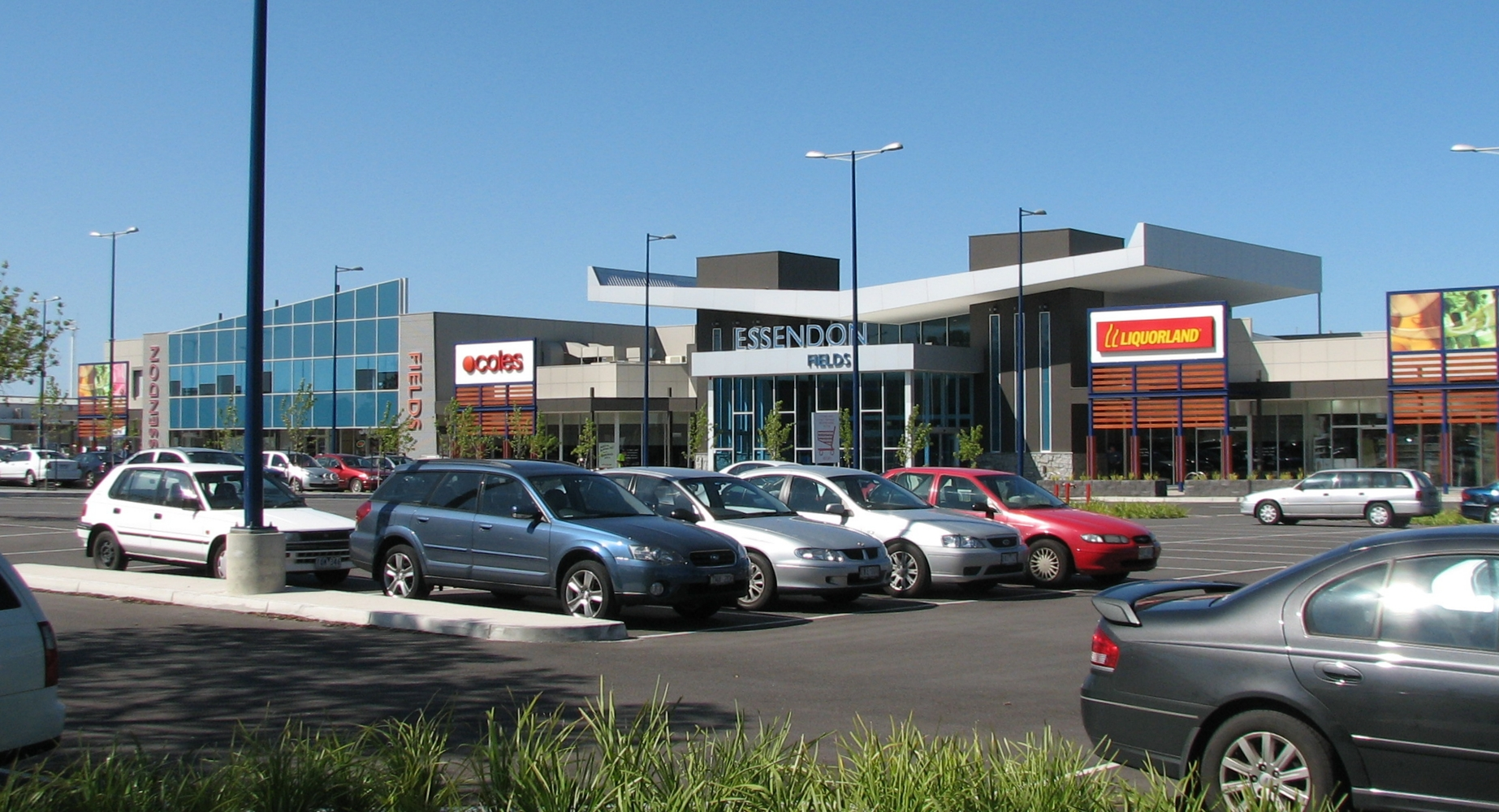
- Essendon Fields Shopping Centre

- Interactive map of Essendon Fields
- Coordinates: 37.728°S 144.900°E
- Country: Australia
- State: Victoria
- City: Melbourne
- LGA: City of Moonee Valley
- Location: 11 km (6.8 mi) from Melbourne
- Established: 14 August 2008

Government
  - State electorate: Essendon
  - Federal division: Maribyrnong
- Elevation: 78 m (256 ft)

Population
  - Total: 0 (2021 census)
- Postcode: 3041
Suburbs around Essendon Fields
| Airport West | Strathmore Heights | Strathmore |
| Airport West | Essendon Fields | Strathmore |
| Airport West | Essendon North | Strathmore |

Essendon Fields is a suburb in Melbourne, Victoria, Australia, 11 km (6.8 mi) north-west of Melbourne's Central Business District, located within the City of Moonee Valley local government area.

Essendon Fields comprises the Essendon Fields Airport and surrounding commercial areas. As it is located on federally leased Airport land, residential development is not permitted. Essendon Fields recorded no population at the 2021 census.The suburb was formally gazetted on 14 August 2008 under the Geographic Place Names Act.

Essendon Fields is a privately managed, major employment centre for Melbourne, and manages more than 300,000 square metres of commercial property across aviation, retail, automotive dealerships, offices and industrial uses.

It is part of the 305 hectare Essendon Fields Airport site that also incorporates Essendon Fields Automotive, a collection of new vehicle showrooms that is the biggest single site for car dealerships in the Southern Hemisphere. In 2025 more than 21,000 cars were sold from the site for the fourth consecutive year, worth an estimated $1 billion AUD.

The Hart Precinct in the Northeast of Essendon Fields is zoned for aviation and light industrial uses. Over 100,000 square metres of new commercial developments were built in the Hart Precinct between 2024 - 2026, including a manufacturing facility for modular building company Modscape, a distribution centre for Dutton Wholesale and a manufacturing facility for Autex Acoustics to make acoustic panels for the construction industry.

Other major facilities at Essendon Fields include the DFO Essendon Shopping Centre managed by Vicinity Centres, comprising over 130 stores.

Major attractions include LaManna Supermarket and an iFLY Indoor Skydiving centre, which opened in 2019. Hyatt opened Australia's first Hyatt Place hotel at Essendon Fields in 2017.

On 21 February 2017 just before 9 am, a Beechcraft Super King Air on a passenger charter flight bound for King Island, Tasmania crashed into the nearby DFO Essendon shopping centre shortly after takeoff from nearby Essendon Airport. All 5 people aboard the flight were killed. As the shopping centre had not opened yet, only staff were at the centre, all of whom were accounted for. The incident was the worst aviation accident in Victoria for 30 years.
