= Essendon North =

Essendon North Melbourne, Victoria
- Coordinates: 37.734°S 144.921°E
- Population: 3,071 (2021 census)
  - Density: 4,390/km^{2} (11,400/sq mi)
- Postcode(s): 3041
- Elevation: 67 m (220 ft)
- Area: 0.7 km^{2} (0.3 sq mi)
- Location: 10 km (6 mi) from Melbourne
- LGA(s): City of Moonee Valley
- State electorate(s): Essendon
- Federal division(s): Maribyrnong
Suburbs around Essendon North:
Airport West	Essendon Fields	Essendon Fields
Niddrie	Essendon North	Strathmore
Essendon	Essendon	Essendon

Essendon North is a suburb in Melbourne, Victoria, Australia, 10 km (6.2 mi) north-west of Melbourne's Central Business District, located within the City of Moonee Valley local government area. Essendon North recorded a population of 3,071 at the 2021 census.

Essendon North is adjacent to Essendon Airport. The airport was proclaimed by the Commonwealth Government in 1921, which had been known as St Johns, after an early landowner. Local residents complained about noise periodically from 1930. Commercial international flights were transferred to the new Melbourne Airport in 1970, and commercial domestic flights followed in 1971.

== See also ==
- City of Essendon – Essendon North was previously within this former local government area.
