= Airport West =

- Suburb
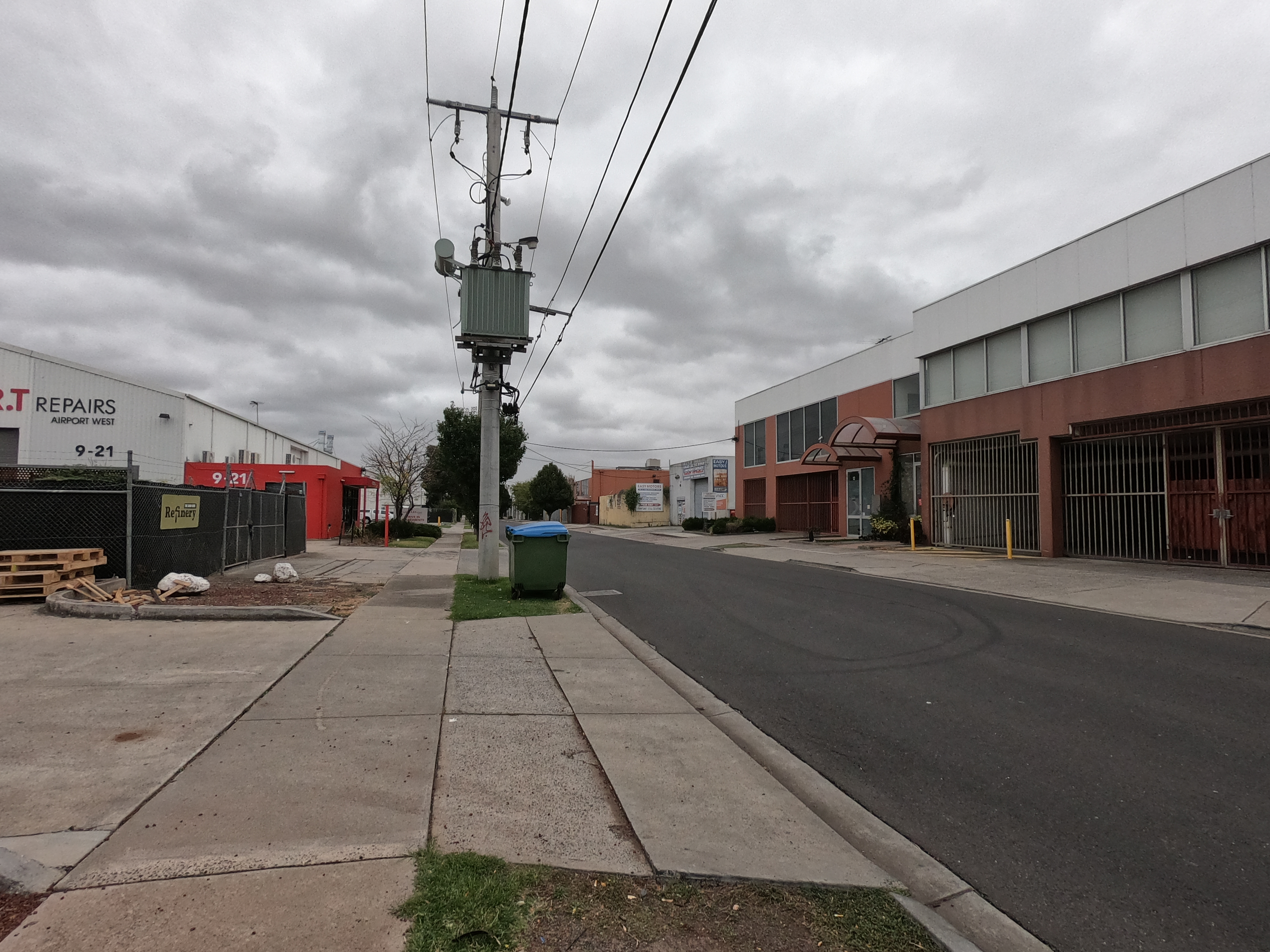
- Hood Street, Airport West

- Interactive map of Airport West
- Coordinates: 37.724°S 144.879°E
- Country: Australia
- State: Victoria
- City: Melbourne
- LGA: City of Moonee Valley
- Location: 12 km (7.5 mi) from Melbourne

Government
  - State electorate: Niddrie
  - Federal division: Maribyrnong

Area
  - Total: 3.7 km^{2} (1.4 sq mi)
- Elevation: 78 m (256 ft)

Population
  - Total: 8,173 (2021 census)
  - Density: 2,209/km^{2} (5,720/sq mi)
- Postcode: 3042
Suburbs around Airport West
Tullamarine	Tullamarine	Gowanbrae; Strathmore Heights
Keilor Park	Airport West	Essendon Fields
Keilor East	Niddrie	Essendon North

Airport West is a suburb in Melbourne, Victoria, Australia, 12 km (7.5 mi) north-west of Melbourne's central business district, located within the City of Moonee Valley local government area. Airport West recorded a population of 8,173 at the 2021 census.

Bounded by the Calder Highway to the south, the Tullamarine Freeway to the east, and the Western Ring Road to the north west, Airport West is so named for its position to the west of Essendon Airport, Melbourne's first general airport now used for light planes, charter and freight since the opening in 1970 of Melbourne Airport, located to the north of the suburb.

It has the distinction of being the only locality in Australia which does not itself contain an airport to contain the word "Airport."

== History ==
This area shares a postcode and, for a time, a name with neighboring Niddrie. In the late 1950s a group of aviation related businesses along Matthews Ave petitioned for a name which might better reflect their location and help their businesses.

Before subdivision in the 1950s and 1960s, a large portion of Airport West were two farms known as Spring Park and Niddrie.

The present Airport West post office opened on 22 November 1982. The Niddrie North office which opened in 1960 was known as Airport West between 1974 and 1982, before reverting to Niddrie North.

== Demographics ==
According to the 2021 census:

The most common ancestries in Airport West were Australian 24.9%, English 23.8%, Italian 23.7%, Irish 10.4% and Scottish 7.2%.

In Airport West, 72.2% of people were born in Australia. The most common countries of birth were Italy 5.8%, India 2.4%, England 1.4%, Greece 1.3% and New Zealand 1.1%.

The most common responses for religion in Airport West were Catholic 44.3%, No Religion, so described 27.2%, Eastern Orthodox 5.8%, Anglican 4.6% and Not stated 4.1%. In Airport West, Christianity was the largest religious group reported overall (64.3%) (this figure excludes not stated responses).

In Airport West, 71.0% of people only spoke English at home. Other languages spoken at home included Italian 8.5%, Greek 3.0%, Mandarin 1.4%, Arabic 1.1% and Spanish 1.0%.

== Transport ==
Tram route 59 travels from Westfield Airport West then runs via Matthews Avenue, Keilor Road, Mount Alexander Road, Fletcher Street, Pascoe Vale Road, Mount Alexander Road, Flemington Road and then terminates at the corner of Elizabeth Street and Flinders Street, at Flinders Street station. In 1943 an extension into Essendon airport was paid for by the Federal government to facilitate workers getting into the airport to service RAAF and American military planes. this extension went up Matthews Avenue turning right into the Airport via Vaughan St.

The Albion-Jacana railway line passes through Airport West near its north and west boundary. A railway line to Melbourne Airport via Airport West has been proposed under The Greens 2008 People Plan.

The currently congested Tullamarine Freeway and Calder Highway interchange saw a redevelopment to help traffic flow easier in 2006–2007.

Seven bus routes operated by CDC Melbourne also service the suburb, and a Night Network also operates around the area.

Many of the street names follow aviation themes:

- Australian WWI Aviators, such as: Harry Hawker, Elwyn King, etc.
- Participants in the 1919 Britain-Australia air race, such as: Ray Parer and John McIntosh, George Fraser, Captain George Matthews, etc.
- Australian Airmen killed in WWII Bombing Raids over Europe, such as: James Cameron, Philip Hart, Fletcher Green, Raymond Earl, George York, Lyle Bowes, and Charles Walters.

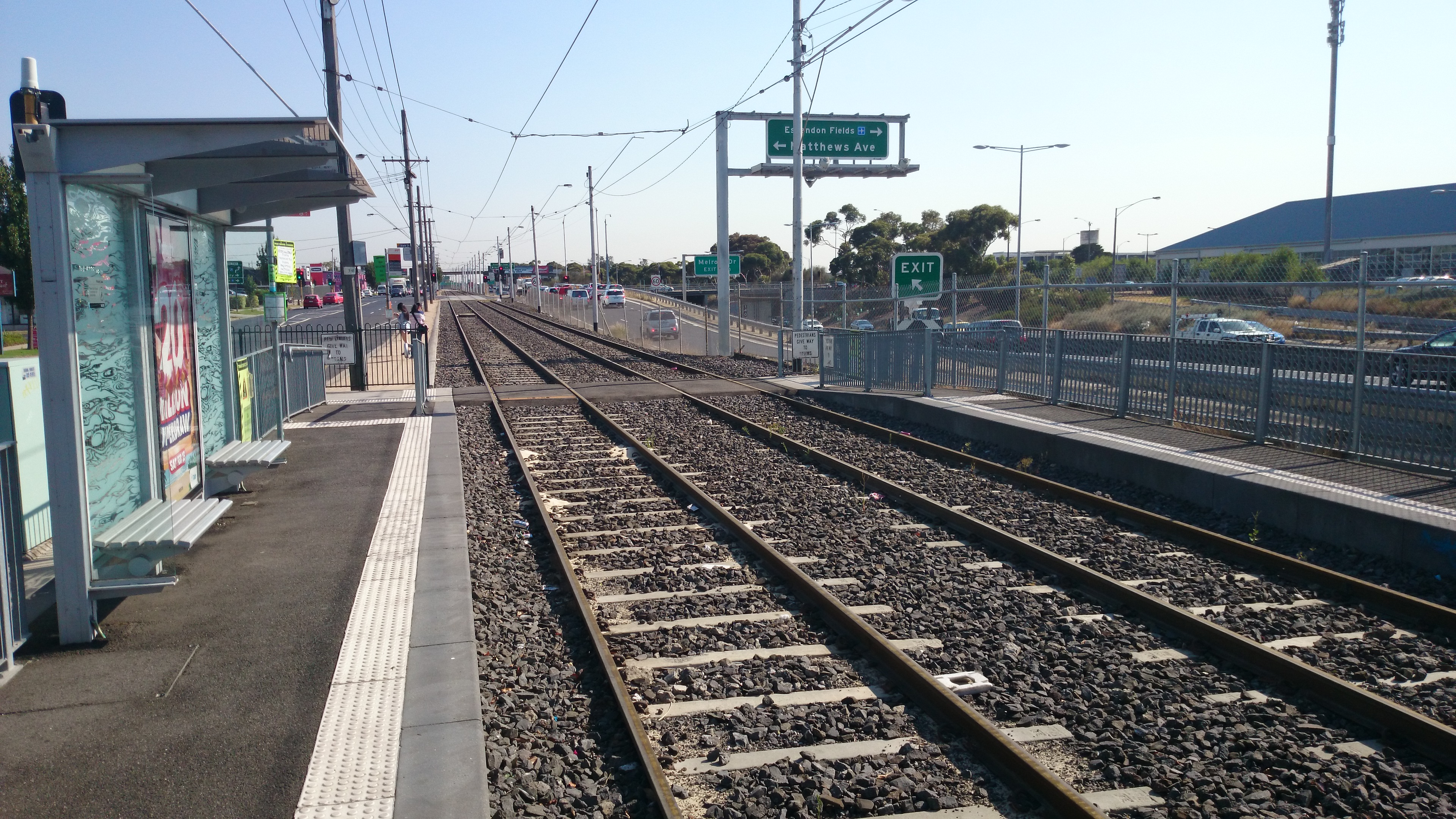
Tram stop 56 ( Earl St-Matthews Ave) at Airport West

== Commerce ==
Westfield Airport West is a shopping centre that was built in the northern corner of the suburb. Opening in 1976 and undergoing redevelopments in 1982 and 1999, it includes Target, Kmart, Coles, Woolworths, Aldi and a Village Cinemas complex. Other shopping areas in the suburb are also located on McNamara Avenue. The suburb contains much light industrial, manufacturing, and freight businesses due to its proximity to Essendon Airport, Melbourne Airport and Essendon DFO.

Skyways Hotel was not the first hotel on this site. In the 1850s the Traveler's Rest Inn was established here on the road to Bulla. In 1962 The International Hotel opened boasting one of the longest public bars in Australia at 120 feet. Sometime in the 1990s it became Skyways. In 2014 it featured as the key location of the movie 'Mule' starring Angus Sampson and Hugo Weaving.

== Educational facilities ==
Airport West has one government primary school (Niddrie PS), a Catholic primary school (St. Christopher's PS) and a secondary school (Niddrie Campus, Essendon Keilor College). There is also the Bravissimi Italian Language School.

== Sport ==
Airport West Football Club, an Australian Rules football team, competes in the Essendon District Football League.

North West Wolves play rugby league in NRL Victoria.

== Notable people ==
- Ben Carroll, 50th Premier of Victoria
- Christine Harris, Australian Netball player
- Hayden Kennedy, AFL Umpire
- Justin Madden, AFL player for Essendon and Carlton, Labor Politician
- Simon Madden, AFL Player for Essendon FC
- Brian Mannix, singer and musician
- Ash Naylor, musician
- Mark Thompson, VFL/AFL player and coach

== See also ==
- City of Keilor – Airport West was previously within this former local government area.
