= Niddrie, Victoria =

Niddrie Melbourne, Victoria
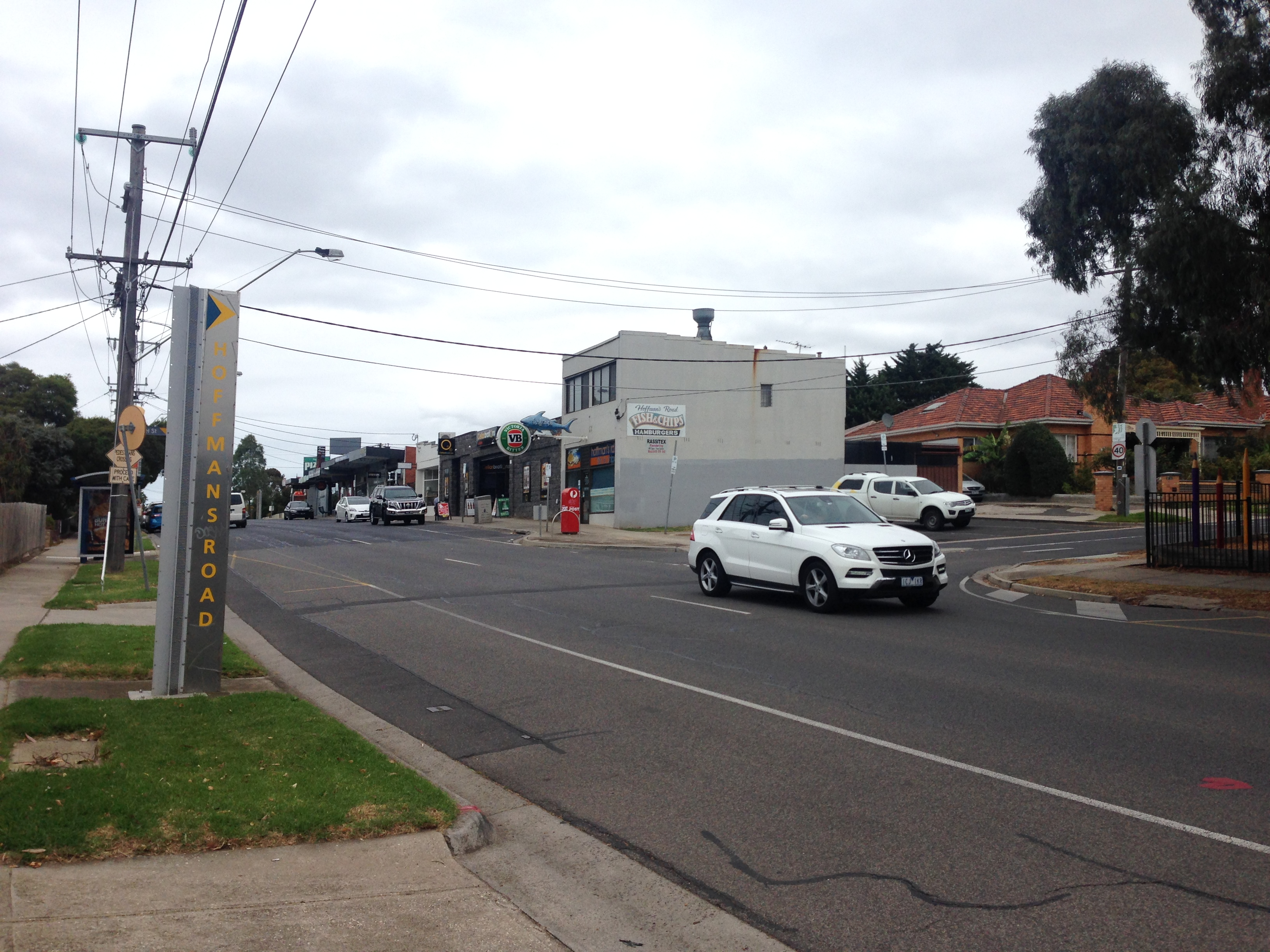
- Hoffmans Road, Niddrie

- Coordinates: 37.745°S 144.886°E
- Population: 5,901 (2021 census)
  - Density: 2,680/km^{2} (6,950/sq mi)
- Established: 1871
- Postcode(s): 3042
- Area: 2.2 km^{2} (0.8 sq mi)
- Location: 11 km (7 mi) from Melbourne
- LGA(s): City of Moonee Valley
- State electorate(s): Niddrie
- Federal division(s): Maribyrnong
Suburbs around Niddrie:
Airport West	Airport West	Essendon North
Keilor East	Niddrie	Essendon
Keilor East	Essendon West	Aberfeldie

Niddrie is a suburb in Melbourne, Victoria, Australia, 11 km (6.8 mi) north-west of Melbourne's Central Business District, located within the City of Moonee Valley local government area. Niddrie recorded a population of 5,901 at the 2021 census.

Niddrie is bounded by the Calder Freeway to the north, Steele Creek to the west, Hoffmans Road to the east and Rosehill Road to the south.

== History ==
Niddrie and the banks of the Maribyrnong River were originally inhabited by the Wurundjeri clan of the Kulin nation.

Between 1843 and 1851, the Scottish settler, Thomas Napier (1802–1881) purchased the Keilor Road land covering Niddrie and Airport West. In 1869, Napier sold this 249-acre (1.01 km^{2}) land to Henry Stevenson (1810–1893). By 1871, Stevenson had built a house he named Niddrie, after his birthplace of Niddrie, a suburb of Edinburgh, Scotland. After his death in 1893, the property was transferred to his wife Elizabeth, who sold it to Patrick Morgan eight years later.

A Keilor East Post Office opened on 1 July 1947 and was renamed Niddrie around 1956. The Niddrie North office opened in 1960, though it was known as Airport West from 1974 until 1982.

Though not officially registered as a suburb until 26 May 1994, the Keilor Council initiated this in 1955.

It is also a matter of record that in 1956 the Melbourne Olympic cauldron was built in work shops behind what later became the Ferguson Plarre site in Keilor Road.

== Commerce ==
The main shopping centre is located on Keilor Road, which has a number of cafes and restaurants serving surrounding suburbs. The main industries of the suburb are construction (19%), property and business services (18%), retail trade (17%) and manufacturing (13%).

== Transport ==
Tram route 59 travels from Westfield Shoppingtown - Airport West (at Matthews Avenue), then runs via Matthews Avenue, Keilor Road, Mount Alexander Road, Fletcher Street, Pascoe Vale Road, Mount Alexander Road, Flemington Road and then terminates at the corner of Elizabeth Street and Flinders Street, Flinders Street station. Catch it at Stop 53 on Keilor Road, Niddrie.

Seven bus routes also service the suburb.

== Landmarks ==
The Niddrie Quarry was established in the 1940s to extract basalt for road paving from the vast lava plain that stretches from Melbourne to Mount Gambier. Quarry operations continued to 1975. Since 1975 local residents have waged a campaign against use of the quarry as a waste dump or for landfill. The site was eventually purchased by the Urban Land Corporation in November 2000 for development of new housing estates with the retention of the quarry as a lake. Currently the site is almost fully developed into a residential housing estate 'Valley Lake', which has seen the lake retained and redeveloped, and a number of small wetlands established along with newly planted native vegetation.

Steele Creek, with the Steele Creek Trail alongside runs through the suburb and is a tributary of the Maribyrnong River.

To the North-East of Niddrie is a shopping centre named Direct Factory Outlet, or DFO.

== Education ==
Within the area there are several schools including Penleigh and Essendon Grammar School, Niddrie Primary School, Essendon Keilor College, Keilor Heights Primary School, Ave Maria College, Rosehill Secondary College, St. Bernards College and St John Bosco's Primary.

== Demographics and religion ==
The 2016 census contains a full set of demographic data on Niddrie. Most of the reported data is comparable to the rest of Victoria, but of note, 47.5% of respondents described themselves as Catholics, compared to 23.2% for the whole of Victoria, and 22.6% for the whole of Australia.

== See also ==
- City of Keilor – Niddrie was previously within this former local government area.
- Jane Thurgood-Dove – murder victim
- Electoral district of Niddrie
