= Laverton North =

- Suburb
- Interactive map of Laverton North
- Coordinates: 37.830°S 144.785°E
- Country: Australia
- State: Victoria
- City: Melbourne
- LGA: City of Wyndham
- Location: 18 km (11 mi) from Melbourne

Government
  - State electorate: Tarneit
  - Federal divisions: Gellibrand; Lalor

Area
  - Total: 15 km^{2} (5.8 sq mi)
- Elevation: 26 m (85 ft)

Population
  - Total: 120 (2021 census)
  - Density: 8.0/km^{2} (20.7/sq mi)
- Postcode: 3026
Suburbs around Laverton North
Derrimut	Derrimut	Brooklyn
Truganina	Laverton North	Altona North
Williams Landing	Laverton	Altona North

Laverton North is a suburb in Melbourne, Victoria, Australia, 18 km (11 mi) west of Melbourne's Central Business District, located within the City of Wyndham local government area. Laverton North recorded a population of 119 at the 2021 census.

Located near the rural-urban fringe, Laverton North is bounded by Boundary Road to the north, Derrimut Road and the Federation Trail to the west, Old Geelong Road and the West Gate Freeway to the south and Kororoit Creek to the east. It is predominantly an industrial suburb.

== Demographics ==
In the 2011 census, 69.23% were born in Australia, 9.89% New Zealand, 4.4% Malta, 3.3% United Kingdom and 13.18% in other countries.

50.55% claimed Christianity, 30.77% claimed other or no religion, 3.3% Buddhism and 3.3% claimed Hinduism.

== Environmental issues ==
=== Fires at recycling facilities ===
Early January 2021, a large industrial fire started at a metal recycling facility owned by InfraBuild. 80 firefighters worked on the 35-square-metre fire.

The same week, another fire started in a pile of scrap metal at Norstar Steel Recyclers, a facility recycling steel. Seventy firefighters worked on fighting the blaze and local residents were advised to stay inside. A similar event occurred at the same facility in February 2018.

Early 2024, a fire started in a stockpile of recycling materials at a recycling facility and burned for two days. EPA Victoria issued a prohibition notice to stop adding more material to the site and an Environmental Action Notice (EAN) to the company.
