= Craigieburn Road =

Road in Melbourne, Victoria

Craigieburn Road Potter Street, Walters Street, Craigieburn Road East Victoria

General information
- Type: Road
- Length: 18 km (11 mi)
- Route number(s): A72 (2024–present) (within Craigieburn); C722 (1997–present) (Craigieburn–Wollert)
- Former route number: C722 (1997–2024) (within Craigieburn)

Major junctions
- West end: Oaklands Road; Konagaderra Road, Oaklands Junction, Victoria
- Mickleham Road; Sydney Road; Hume Freeway; Epping Road
- East end: Lehmanns Road, Epping, Melbourne

Location(s)
- Major suburbs: Craigieburn, Wollert

Craigieburn Road (inclusive of the sections known as Potter Street, Walters Street and Craigieburn Road East) is an arterial road located in the northern suburbs of Melbourne.

== Route ==
Craigieburn Road is usually considered divided into two sections, with Sydney Road being the divider.

The eastern section begins at the intersection with Epping Road and Lehmanns Road, known as Craigieburn Road heading westbound as a single carriageway road with a speed limit of 80km/h, providing access to a number of new estates in the developing suburb of Wollert. Crossing the Hume Freeway, the road briefly widens to become a 4 lane divided road, with a freeway entrance and exit southbound only. Continuing on west, the road again narrows to a 2 lane single carriageway, crossing the Merri Creek and changing its name to Craigieburn Road East, and then connecting to Sydney Road via an unusual grade separated interchange. Eastern access to Sydney Road is via a small north south road on the eastern side, whilst western access passes under Sydney Road, changing its local name to Potter Street and accessing Sydney Road from a connection there.

The western section begins in Oaklands Junction as an undeclared local road, heading eastbound until Mickleham Road in Yuroke where the declared Craigieburn Road begins. The road continues eastbound throughout Craigieburn, acting as the main east-west arterial through the suburb, providing access to Craigieburn Central Shopping Centre and a number of residential areas. The road here is mostly a 2 lane single carriageway road, with a short section of divided road between Highlander Drive and Waterview Boulevard, as well as near the Craigieburn Plaza Shopping Centre. Towards the eastern end, the road continues through a roundabout and shortly after changes name to Walters Street to connect with Craigieburn Station, whilst at the same roundabout a short connector road (which is also known locally as Craigieburn Road but not otherwise considered part of the declared road) provides access to a traffic light intersection with Sydney Road. The eastern and western sections are connected via Sydney Road itself.

== History ==
The passing of the Road Management Act 2004 granted the responsibility of overall management and development of Victoria's major arterial roads to VicRoads: in 2004, VicRoads declared Craigieburn Road (Arterial #5106) from Mickleham Road in Craigieburn to Epping-Kilmore Road (known locally as Epping Road) in Wollert; the road is still known (and signposted) as its constituent parts, although a number of signs on the eastern section of Craigieburn Road not within the section of Craigieburn Road East also are signed as Craigieburn Road East.

Craigieburn Road had previously been given no route designation. With Victoria's conversion to the newer alphanumeric system, the road was assigned C722 in 1997 for both sections, and then with completion of major works for the Craigieburn Road Upgrade in 2024, the western section within Craigieburn was assigned A72. C722 duplexes with Metro Route 55 along Sydney Road briefly to connect the eastern and western sections.

== Major works ==
The road in recent years has experienced extreme congestion, in both the eastern section since new estates have emerged in Wollert as well as the western section as Craigieburn and surrounding suburbs continue to grow. The Craigieburn Road Upgrade will upgrade the western section to make the road a divided road with 2 to 3 lanes each way between Mickleham Road and Sydney Road, as well as upgrade a number of intersections. The project commenced in 2021 and is planned to be complete by 2025.

The eastern section will be covered by the Craigieburn Road East Upgrade, which is currently developing a business case which will be completed by 2023. The project will upgrade the road between Epping Road and the Hume Freeway.

== Major intersections ==
LGA	Location	km	mi	Destinations	Notes
Hume	Oaklands Junction			Oaklands Road, Konagaderra Road	
Hume	Mickleham–Craigieburn–Yuroke tripoint			Mickleham Road (C739) – Greenvale, Mickleham	
Hume	Craigieburn			Aitken Boulevard – Roxburgh Park, Mickleham	
Hume	Craigieburn			Sydney Road – Campbellfield, Seymour	
Whittlesea	Wollert			Hume Freeway – City	
Whittlesea	Wollert			Epping Road – Epping, Wandong	
Whittlesea	Wollert			Lehmanns Road	
