= Sydney Road =

Road in Melbourne, Australia

Sydney Road Hume Highway Victoria
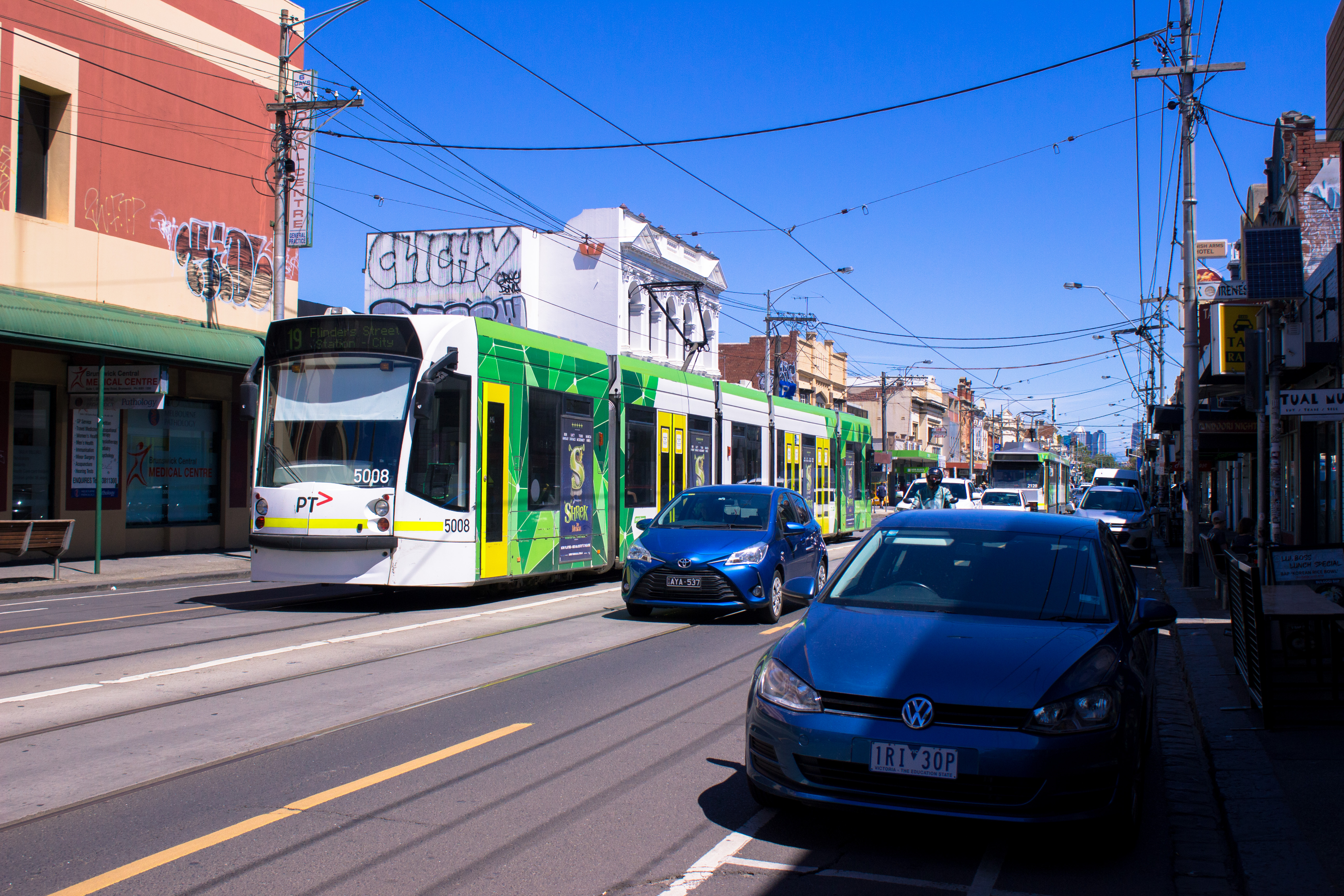
- Sydney Road, Brunswick, looking south to the CBD

General information
- Type: Road
- Length: 24 km (15 mi)
- Route number(s): Metro Route 55 (2005–present) Entire route; Concurrencies: C722 (1998–present) (through Craigieburn)
- Former route number: National Highway M31 (1997–2005) (Craigieburn–Fawkner); National Highway 31 (1974–2005) (Fawkner–Brunswick); National Highway 31 (1974–1997) (Craigieburn–Fawkner); National Route 31 (1954–1974) Entire route

Major junctions
- North end: Hume Freeway; Craigieburn, Melbourne
- Western Ring Road
- South end: Royal Parade; Brunswick, Melbourne

Location(s)
- LGA(s): City of Hume; City of Merri-bek
- Major suburbs: Craigieburn, Somerton, Campbellfield, Coburg

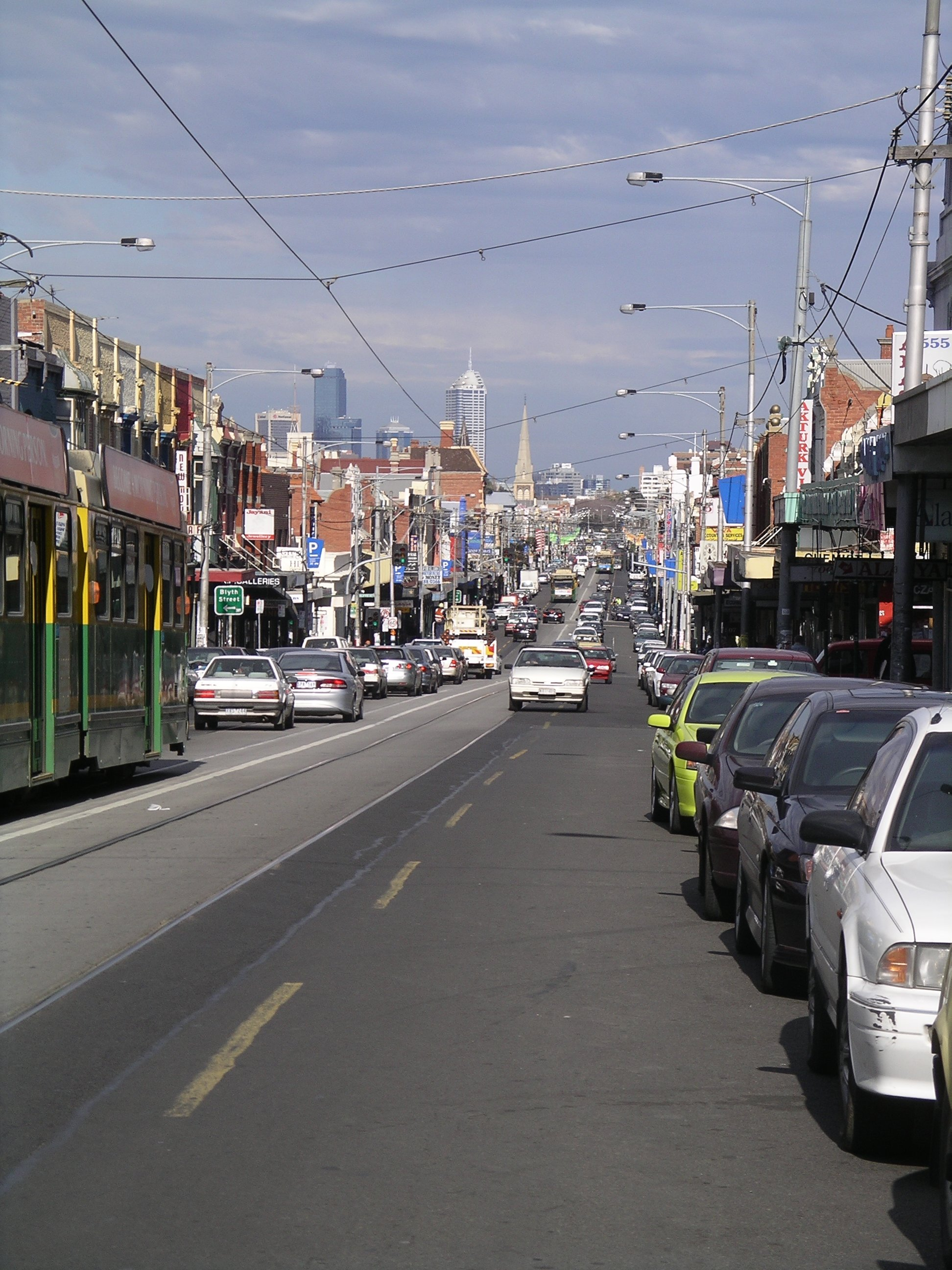
Sydney Road in July 2004

Sydney Road (in its northernmost part also known as the Hume Highway) is a major urban arterial in the northern suburbs of Melbourne, Victoria, Australia.

== Geography ==
Sydney Road starts at the northern end of Royal Parade at the boundary of Parkville and Brunswick and continues north through Brunswick, Coburg, Coburg North, Hadfield, Fawkner, Campbellfield, Somerton and Craigieburn, where it joins the Hume Freeway.

The section passing through Brunswick and Coburg, between Park Street at its southern end and Bell Street near the site of the former Pentridge prison, at its northern end, is Melbourne's longest continuous shopping strip, with an abundance of small businesses and a variety of restaurants and coffee shops, clothing stores, places of worship, and community services. It is well known for its wedding fashion shops, discount shopping and a number of specialist food stores.

== History ==
Previously part of Hume Highway, the road was bypassed as the main route through northern Melbourne when the Craigieburn bypass opened in 2005; the road name was devolved back to its original identity as Sydney Road as a consequence.

As a part of the Hume Highway, the road was signed as National Route 31 in 1954. The Whitlam government introduced the federal National Roads Act 1974, where roads declared as a National Highway were still the responsibility of the states for road construction and maintenance, but were fully compensated by the Federal government for money spent on approved projects. As an important interstate link between the capitals of Victoria and New South Wales, the Hume Highway was declared a National Highway in 1974.

With Victoria's conversion to the newer alphanumeric system in the late 1990s, the section between Craigieburn and Fawkner (where it met the Western Ring Road) was upgraded to National Highway M31; it was left as National Highway 31 south of the ring road along its original alignment into central Melbourne. Once the Craigieburn bypass was opened in 2005 and National Route M31 was re-routed onto the new bypass, the old route was replaced with Metropolitan Route 55 from Craigieburn to the central suburb of Docklands.

The passing of the Road Management Act 2004 granted the responsibility of overall management and development of Victoria's major arterial roads to VicRoads: VicRoads declared this road as Sydney Road (Arterial #5733), beginning from Bell Street in Coburg and ending at Brunswick Road, Brunswick in 2004, and as Coburg-Craigieburn Road (Arterial #5500), from Bell Street to where it meets Hume Freeway in Craigieburn in 2006; the road in its entirety is still presently known (and signposted) as Sydney Road.

=== Community ===
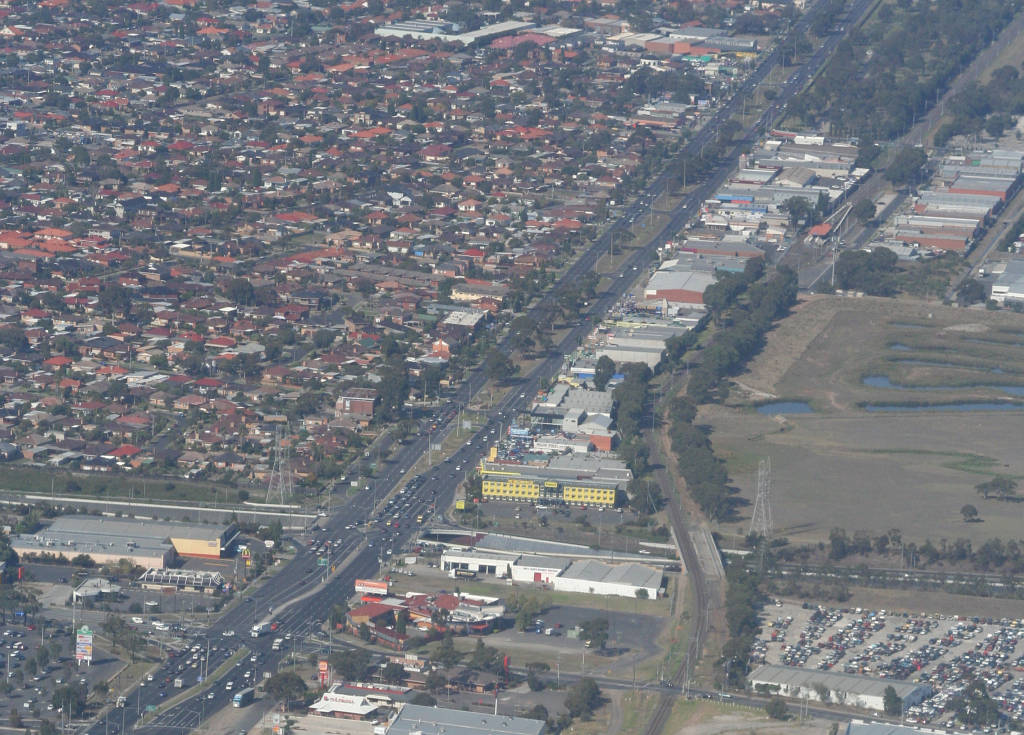
North end of the road, in Fawkner at the Western Ring Road interchange

In February 1841, George Jones opened a retail store on Sydney Road in Pentridge.

The Victorian gold rush in the 1850s caused businesses to flourish on Sydney Road. Many were established to supply the miners on their trek north to the gold fields. Numerous hotels were built along Sydney Road in this period including the Brunswick Hotel, the Cornish Arms Hotel, the Sarah Sands Hotel, the Cumberland Arms Hotel, the Edinburgh Castle Hotel and the Court House Hotel. It was originally called Pentridge Road, as it connected the city with Pentridge prison. It was renamed Sydney Road in 1859.

The early hub of business activity was between Weston Street and Albert Street in Brunswick, but by the 1880s businesses were rapidly being established beyond Albion Street. In the 1920s the clothing and textile industries grew; evidence of their presence in the area can still be seen in the existence of tailors shops, fabric shops and an abundance of wedding gown shops.

During the 1930s the Unemployed Workers Movement held street meetings on the corner of Sydney Road and Phoenix Street. These meetings were harassed and suppressed by the police, under the direct orders of Police Commissioner, General Thomas Blamey. Young Australian artist Noel Counihan played a significant part in this campaign. The State Government, concerned about the public sympathy being generated, eventually changed the law in regard to obstruction, with no requirement of permits to speak. A Free Speech memorial was built outside the Mechanics' Institute on the corner of Sydney and Glenlyon Roads to commemorate the success of the free speech fights. Counihan's work as an artist and local resident is also commemorated by the Counihan Gallery on Sydney Road run by the City of Merri-bek Council.

During the second world war and in the 1950s, Sydney Road came alive with late night shopping. This included late night shopping parades with floats. The construction of the Barkly Square shopping complex immediately to the east of Sydney Road in the 1980s coincided with a decline in the success of the strip. The Sydney Road Brunswick Association was formed in the early 1990s to provide a focus for action to revive the strip, utilising a range of community development and marketing techniques.

With postwar immigration, many migrant families established businesses. The multicultural nature of business on Sydney Road is reflected in the cuisines offered by its restaurants and cafes. Italian, Greek and Balkan cuisines were once the dominant non-Anglo fare, but since the 1980s Sydney Road's eateries have diversified and increased in number, so that the food available now includes Lebanese, Afghan, Thai, Chinese, Vietnamese, Japanese, North and East African, Balinese, Indian, Pakistani, Sri Lankan and Nepali cuisines. In the early 2000s, several hotels (pubs) were renovated and have become very popular live music venues. Property prices in Brunswick and Coburg (south of Bell Street) rose sharply in the 1990s and early 2000s. The signs of gentrification are increasingly evident in the southern quarter of Sydney Road, with a rising number of clothing boutiques and many new eateries serving eclectic and contemporary Australian 'fusion' cuisine in stylish, designer environments, producing an increasingly diversified street life.

As a major activity centre in Merri-bek, Sydney Road is a key component in any strategies of urban intensification to meet the requirements of the Victorian Government's metropolitan strategy, Melbourne 2030. In his first speech in December 2006, newly elected Moreland Mayor Mark O'Brien proposed turning the entire 4.5 km commercial strip between Brunswick Road and Bell Street into a promenade, which would transform the usually congested Sydney Road into one of the longest pedestrian streets in the world.

== Landmarks ==
Sydney Road contains many historical landmarks. Many of the hotels date from the 1850s, including the Cornish Arms hotel and the Sarah Sands Hotel on the corner of Brunswick Road. The Bombay Rock at the corner of Phoenix Street, was one of the pre-eminent rock music venues in Melbourne in the 1970s and 80s.

Brunswick Town Hall, built in 1876 on the corner of Dawson Street, is an imposing Victorian edifice. It was saved from planned destruction by the municipal council in 1973-1974 when Vic and Vida Little, along with the Brunswick Progress Association, led a successful campaign to preserve it. The building was significantly extended and renovated in the early 1990s to upgrade the library, offices and public assembly spaces.

Diagonally opposite from the Town Hall stands the Mechanics Institute, built in 1868, and used for worker education and social activities. A monument to the Free Speech fights of the 1930s stands near the corner. The history of many of the single and double story shop fronts can be seen in the names and years moulded into the upper portions of the building facades. The Mechanics Institute now provides a popular performance space and offices for local arts administrators.

== Notable institutions ==
Sydney Road has a number of institutions that are notable for their contribution to the broader cultural life of Melbourne. The A1 Middle Eastern Bakery, at the top of Brunswick Hill is the most high-profile of a number of such bakeries in the area, well known for products such as flat bread that are supplied across Melbourne. A tour of these bakeries forms part of Melbourne's annual Food and Wine festival.

== Transport ==
Tram route 19 runs along the inner section of Sydney Road, starting at Bakers Road in Coburg North and ending in Elizabeth Street at Flinders Street station in the city. The Upfield railway line from the city loop runs parallel to Sydney Road about 200m to the west, with stations at Jewell, Brunswick, Anstey, Moreland and Coburg. The road has historically been signed as Route 31, but since the opening of the Craigieburn Bypass has been relegated to Route 55.

== Major intersections and suburbs ==
LGA	Location	km	mi	Destinations	Notes
Hume	Craigieburn	0.0	0.0	Hume Freeway (M31 north) – Seymour, Shepparton, Wodonga, Sydney	Northbound exit and southbound entrance ramps only Northern terminus of road and Metro Route 55
Hume	Craigieburn	2.1	1.3	Grand Boulevard (west) – Craigieburn; Amaroo Road (east) – City via Hume Freeway (M31 south)	
Hume	Craigieburn	3.5	2.2	Craigieburn Road West (A72) – Craigieburn, Oaklands Junction	Northern terminus of concurrency with route C722
Hume	Craigieburn	3.8	2.4	North East railway line	
Hume	Craigieburn	4.3	2.7	Craigieburn Road East (C722) – Wollert, Mernda, City via Hume Freeway	Southern terminus of concurrency with route C722
Hume	Somerton	8.7	5.4	Somerton Road (Metro Routes 35/58 west) – Roxburgh Park, Bulla; Cooper Street (Metro Route 58 east) – Epping, South Morang, Diamond Creek	
Hume	Campbellfield	11.4	7.1	Barry Road – Broadmeadows	
Hume	Campbellfield	13.9	8.6	Camp Road (Metro Route 48 west) – Broadmeadows, Tullamarine; Mahoneys Road (Metro Route 48 east) – Thomastown, Greensborough, Eltham	
Hume–Merri-bek boundary	Fawkner	14.2	8.8	Western Ring Road (M80) – Greensborough, Laverton North	Single-point urban interchange
Merri-bek	Fawkner	14.5	9.0	Anderson Road – Fawkner	
Merri-bek	Fawkner	15.2	9.4	Jukes Road – Fawkner	
Merri-bek	Fawkner	15.6	9.7	Box Forest Road – Glenroy	
Merri-bek	Fawkner	17.2	10.7	Boundary Road (west) – Hadfield; Queens Parade (east) – Fawkner	
Merri-bek	Coburg North	18.2	11.3	Bakers Road – Coburg North	
Merri-bek	Coburg North	18.9	11.7	Gaffney Street (west) – Pascoe Vale; Murray Road (east) – Preston	
Merri-bek	Coburg	19.3	12.0	Ohea Street (west) – Pascoe Vale South; Pentridge Road (east) – Coburg, to Bell Street eastbound – Heidelberg	
Merri-bek	Coburg	19.7	12.2	Bell Street (Metro Route 40) – Heidelberg, Strathmore	No left turn southbound to Bell Street eastbound; no right turn northbound from Bell Street westbound
Merri-bek	Coburg	23.7	14.7	Moreland Road – Thornbury, Essendon	
Merri-bek	Brunswick	23.7	14.7	Brunswick Road (Metro Route 38) – Northcote, Moonee Ponds	
Merri-bek	Brunswick	23.7	14.7	Royal Parade (Metro Route 55) – Parkville, City	Southern terminus of road, Metro Route 55 continues south along Royal Parade
1.000 mi = 1.609 km; 1.000 km = 0.621 mi: Concurrency terminus; Incomplete access; Route transition
