= List of places on the Victorian Heritage Register in the City of Hume =

This is a list of places on the Victorian Heritage Register in the City of Hume in Victoria, Australia. The Victorian Heritage Register is maintained by the Heritage Council of Victoria.

The Victorian Heritage Register, as of 2020, lists the following 17 state-registered places within the City of Hume:

Place name	Place #	Location	Suburb or Town	Co-ordinates	Built	State registered	Photo
Arundel Road Trestle Bridge	H1952	over the Maribyrnong River	Keilor	37.703910°S 144.832770°E	1906-07	13 September 2001	
Bluestone Bridge over Jackson Creek	H1426	Sunbury Rd over Jackson Creek	Sunbury	37.583990°S 144.741350°E	1870	20 August 1982	
Bluestone Bridge over Moonee Ponds Creek	H1455	Fawkner St over Moonee Ponds Creek	Westmeadows	37.676370°S 144.887680°E	1869	20 August 1982	
Bulla Primary School	H1643	11 School Lane	Bulla	37.635870°S 144.796250°E	1870-71	20 August 1982	
Craiglee Winery	H0677	785 Sunbury Rd	Sunbury	37.676370°S 144.887680°E	1865-68	23 December 1987	
Emu Bottom Homestead	H0274	410 Racecourse Rd	Sunbury	37.539417°S 144.734500°E	c. 1836	9 October 1974	
Glenara	H0625	10 Glenara Dve	Bulla	37.643460°S 144.808160°E	1857	1 October 1986	
Manor House	H1181	1 Eldon St	Broadmeadows	37.690090°S 144.950140°E	c. 1850	18 April 1996	
Mount Ridley Homestead	H2246	100 Mt Ridley Rd	Mickleham	37.567170°S 144.932080°E	1848-50	8 December 2011	
Rail Bridge over Blind Creek	H1441	over Blind Creek	Sunbury	37.572880°S 144.733390°E	c. 1859	20 August 1982	
Macedon Street Bridge	H1694	Macedon Street over the Bendigo railway line	Sunbury	37.576250°S 144.730120°E	1861	20 August 1982	
Rupertswood	H0275	3-5 Macedon St	Sunbury	37.572840°S 144.736910°E	1874-76	9 October 1974	
Scots Uniting Church	H0127	1702-1708 Sydney Rd	Campbellfield	37.675490°S 144.957530°E	1855	9 October 1974	
Sunbury Hill Railway Bridge	H1964	over a tributary of Jackson Creek	Sunbury	37.599760°S 144.718180°E	c. 1859	21 December 2001	
Sunbury Asylum	H0937	Circular Dve	Sunbury	37.593370°S 144.729020°E	1865	20 August 1982	
Water Tower	H1673	Sunbury railway station 1 Brook St	Sunbury	37.579230°S 144.727740°E	1861	20 August 1982	
Woodlands Homestead	H1612	Woodlands Dve	Greenvale	37.638680°S 144.843010°E	1843-46	9 October 1974	
