= Mickleham =

Mickleham may refer to:

- Mickleham, Victoria, Australia
- Mickleham, Surrey, England
