= Shire of Bulla =

Coordinates: 37°35′S 144°43′E

Shire of Bulla Victoria
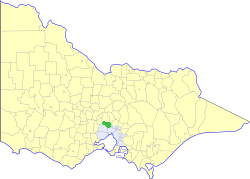
- Location in Victoria
- The Shire of Bulla as at its dissolution in 1994
- Population: 42,500 (1992)
  - Density: 100.67/km^{2} (260.73/sq mi)
- Established: 1862
- Area: 422.17 km^{2} (163.0 sq mi)
- Council seat: Sunbury
- Region: Northwest Melbourne
- County: Bourke
LGAs around Shire of Bulla:
Gisborne	Romsey	Kilmore
Gisborne	Shire of Bulla	Whittlesea
Melton	Keilor	Broadmeadows

The Shire of Bulla was a local government area about 40 kilometres (25 mi) northwest of Melbourne, the state capital of Victoria, Australia. The shire covered an area of 422.17 square kilometres (163.0 sq mi), and existed from 1862 until 1994.

== History ==
The Bulla Road District was created on 16 September 1862. It became a shire on 9 March 1866. It gained some territory from the Shire of Broadmeadows in 1955, including then-rural areas such as Craigieburn. The Shire Offices were transferred from Bulla to Sunbury in 1956.

On 15 December 1994, the Shire of Bulla was abolished, and along with parts of the City of Broadmeadows north of the Western Ring Road and parts of the Cities of Keilor and Whittlesea, was merged into the newly created City of Hume.

Council met at the Shire Offices, in Sunbury. The facility is used today by the City of Hume, Western Water and VicRoads.

== Wards ==
The Shire of Bulla was divided into four ridings on 1 April 1985, each of which elected three councillors:

- Bulla Riding
- Craigieburn Riding
- Sunbury East Riding
- Sunbury West Riding

== Suburbs and localities ==
- Attwood
- Bulla
- Craigieburn (shared with the City of Whittlesea)
- Diggers Rest (shared with the Shire of Melton)
- Greenvale
- Kalkallo
- Melbourne Airport (shared with the City of Keilor)
- Mickleham
- Oaklands Junction
- Roxburgh Park
- Somerton (shared with the City of Whittlesea)
- Sunbury*
- Wildwood
- Yuroke

* Council seat.

== Population ==
Year	Population
1871	2,234
1947	2,656
1954	3,232
1958	4,020*+
1961	4,824
1966	5,711
1971	8,243
1976	13,399
1981	18,624
1986	28,347
1991	39,301

* Estimate in the 1958 Victorian Year Book.
+ Includes population gained from City of Broadmeadows in 1955.
