= Kalkallo =

- Suburb
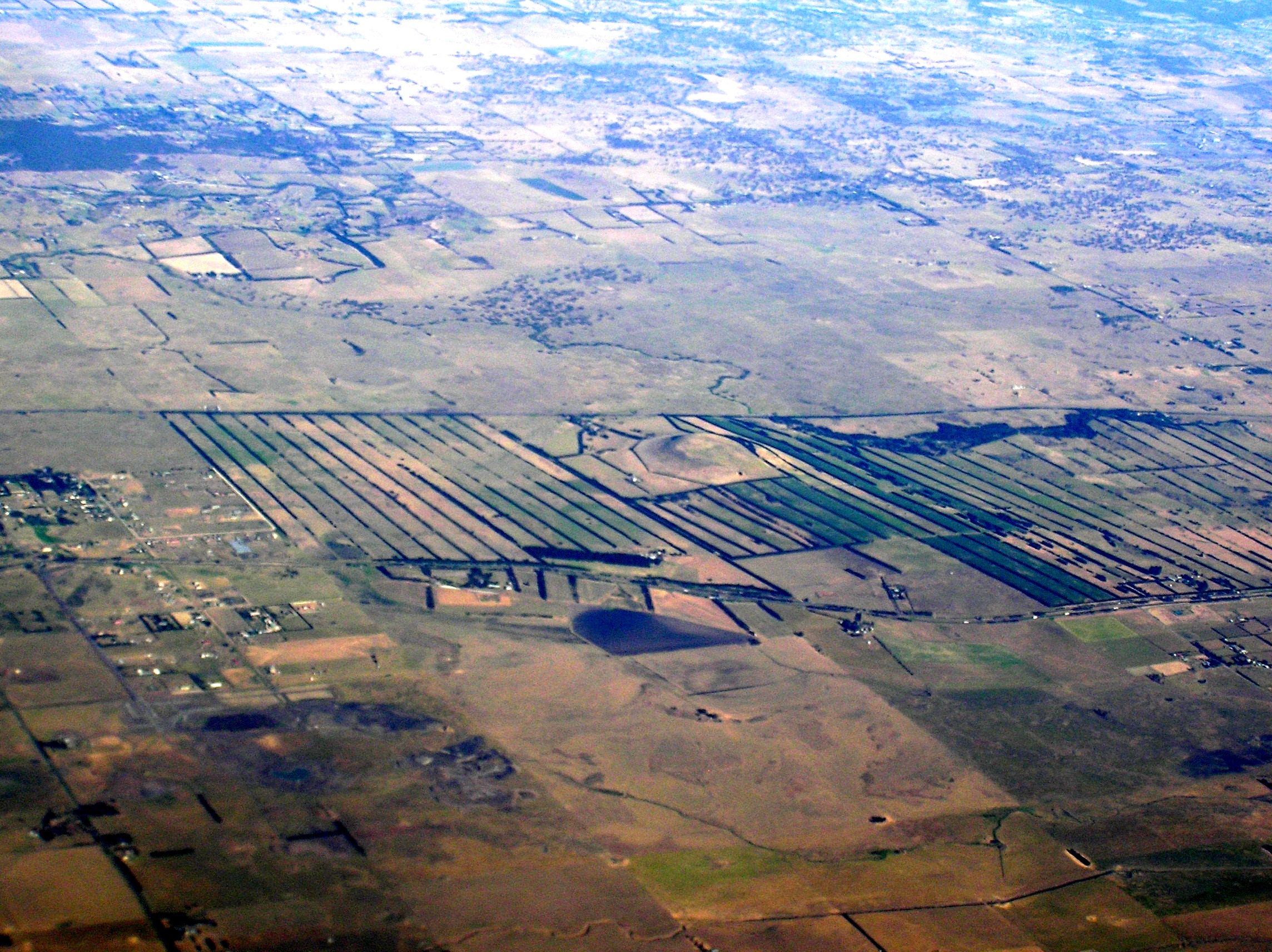
- Region north of Kalkallo with volcano at Bald Hill

- Interactive map of Kalkallo
- Coordinates: 37°31′37″S 144°56′49″E
- Country: Australia
- State: Victoria
- LGA: City of Hume
- Location: 31 km (19 mi) N of Melbourne; 7 km (4.3 mi) N of Craigieburn

Government
  - State electorate: Kalkallo
  - Federal division: McEwen

Population
  - Total: 5,548 (2021 census)
- Postcode: 3064

Kalkallo is an outer suburb of Melbourne, Victoria, Australia, 31 km (19 mi) north of Melbourne's central business district, located within the City of Hume local government area. Kalkallo recorded a population of 5,548 at the 2021 census.

Located on the Hume Freeway, Kalkallo had, until the 2010s, a few streets, a service station and a pub. It was formerly surrounded by farms that were not yet consumed by the urban sprawl of Melbourne. The majority of the suburb is being developed by Cloverton Estate.

== History ==
The Kalkallo area is located on the traditional lands of the Woiwurrung people. It is believed that the clan which occupied land including the South Morang area, was the Wurundjeri-willam. The name Kalkallo originates from the language from the indigenous people, but its meaning is obscure.

European colonisation began in Victoria in 1835, and there were land sales in the Parish of Kalkallo in 1840. An example of an early rural town settlement, Kalkallo, originally called Kinlochewe and then Donnybrook, has many natural and cultural heritage sites of significance, including churches, hotels, monuments, bridges, waterways and grasslands. In 1848, residents began requesting a post office for the township, and Kinlochewe Post Office was opened on 1 November 1850, located in the Robert Burns Inn on Summerhill Road and Sydney Road. In 1854, it was moved and renamed Donnybrook, then renamed Kalkallo in 1874, before eventually closing in 1971.

During the gold rush years of the 1850s, the township boomed as travellers made their way along the Sydney Road and there were seventeen accommodation houses, a police station, jail and court house. In the 1870s, the opening of the North East railway line saw a decrease in passing road traffic and the town's population declined.

== Environment ==
Kalkallo is located amongst the large Gilgai plain. Located near Donovans Lane, north-west of the town centre, is the Bald Hill volcano that last erupted over a million years ago. Merri Creek runs through Kalkallo, to the east of the area. The Kalkallo Grasslands are remnants of a large area of grassland which is home to many threatened species of plants, amphibians and reptiles.

=== Flora ===
- Gilgai Brown Grass
- Small Pepper Cress
- Dianella amoena
- Prasophyllum frenchii
- Pussy tails
- Narrow-leaf new holland daisy
- Chaffy bush-pea
- Smooth rice flower
- Plains Yam Daisy

=== Fauna ===
- Growling grass frog
- Red-chested buttonquail
- Plains froglet
- Common spade foot toad
- Cunningham's spiny-tailed skink
- Bougainvilles skink
- Lowland copperhead
- Australian Smelt
- Water Rat
- Engaeus Quadrimanus
- Eastern three-lined skink
- Tussock skink
- Little whip snake
- Southern lined earless dragon
- Striped legless lizard

== Planning ==
Kalkallo has been a focus of a number of town planning ideas since colonisation, but remained largely undeveloped until the 2010s. Since then, a number of housing developments have been planned and built.

=== Garden City ===
As part of the publication We Must Go On: A Study of Planned Reconstruction and Housing, Oswald Barnett, along with Walter Burt and Frank Heath, focused on improvement of housing in Australia and Melbourne after World War II. Barnett and Burt played a significant role in the Housing Investigation and Slum Abolition Board, set up in 1936, and the garden city movement was a key concept in plans to solve the slum problem in Melbourne. Frank Heath, an architect, produced town plans based on garden city principles, and plans for Kalkallo as a garden city were printed in We Must Go On. The book did not detail the motives for the plans and they were never implemented. As a result, Kalkallo remained a small township.

=== Urban Growth Boundary ===
In 2010, Melbourne's urban growth boundary was extended to include Kalkallo. In 2012, it was designated as part of the Urban Growth Zone. Urban sprawl is a divisive topic in Melbourne, as it is claimed to ease housing affordability, but can have significant impacts on the environment, as well as social impacts such as isolation due to a lack of transport infrastructure. The Victorian State Government has expanded the Urban Growth Boundary several times since 2002 as a result of the Melbourne 2030 plan (later known as Melbourne@5million). Melbourne 2030 introduced the notion of creating a limit on urban expansion. However, since the implementation of Melbourne 2030, the boundary has been extended, which is contradictory to a key objective. Plan Melbourne, established in May 2014 highlighted the need for the Metropolitan Planning Authority to establish a permanent urban boundary to replace the urban growth boundary, and restrict further expansion.

== Today ==
Until the 2010s, Kalkallo was a small town serving the highway trade and surrounding agricultural district.

Current community infrastructure includes:

- Kalkallo Common (a 9.8 ha crown land grassland reserve managed by Hume City Council)
- Kalkallo Cemetery
- Kalkallo CFA
- John Laffan Memorial Reserve (an 8ha reserve containing two ovals)

=== New housing developments ===
As a result of the urban growth boundary expansion, there have been a number of new housing developments established:

- Merrifield – Merrifield is an 880 hectare $8 Billion mixed-use development located on the corner of Donnybrook Road and the Hume Highway. Merrifield has been planned as an integrated mixed use development with capacity to provide 20,000 new jobs and homes for up to 30,000 people.
- Cloverton – Located around the Ball Hill area, plans include a large metropolitan activity centre and a future train station north of Donnybrook. Cloverton will eventually house 30,000 residents.
- Kallo – A smaller development north of Donnybrook Road that will border Merri Creek, close to the existing Donnybrook railway station. Master plans outline 730 homes with 2000 residents with facilities such as a community centre, primary school, open space, nature reserve and town centre.
- The Woods – Mickleham

== Transport ==
=== Bus ===
Two bus routes serve Kalkallo:

- 511 : Donnybrook station – Mandalay (Beveridge) via Olivine (Donnybrook), operated by CDC Melbourne
- 525 : Donnybrook station – Craigieburn station via Mickleham, operated by Dysons

=== Train ===
The nearest railway station is Donnybrook station, served by regional V/Line trains on the Seymour and Shepparton lines.

== Education ==
Kalkallo has three primary schools:

- Gilgai Plains Primary School (opened 2022)
- Banum Warrik Primary School (opened 2024)
- Hume Anglican College (Kalkallo Campus)

== See also ==
- City of Whittlesea – Kalkallo was previously within this local government area.
