= Wildwood, Victoria =

Wildwood
- Town
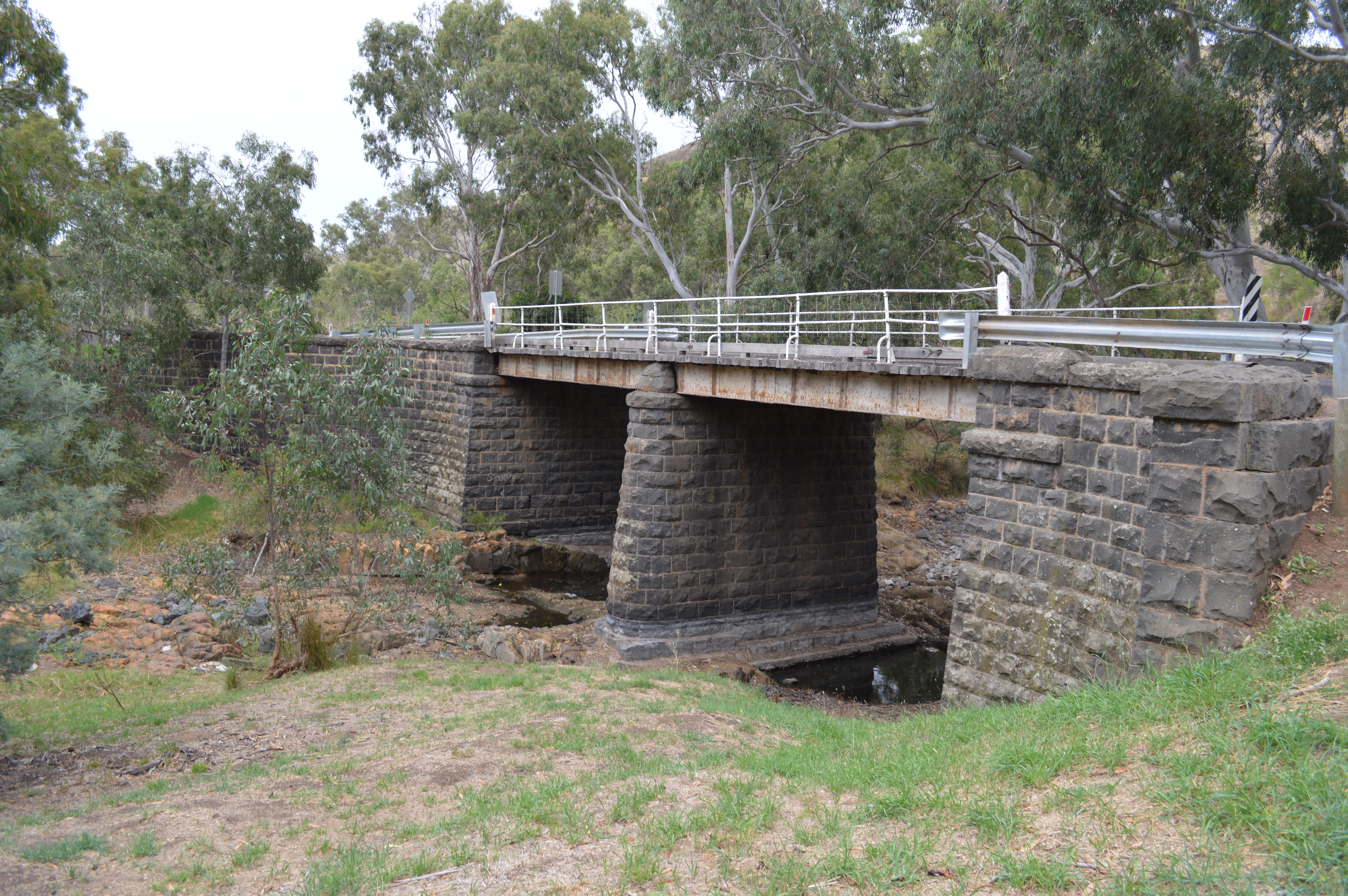
- The heritage-listed Wildwood Road Bridge over Deep Creek

- Interactive map of Wildwood
- Coordinates: 37°34′18″S 144°47′37″E
- Country: Australia
- State: Victoria
- City: Melbourne
- LGA: City of Hume
- Location: 31 km (19 mi) NW of Melbourne; 5 km (3.1 mi) E of Sunbury

Government
  - State electorate: Sunbury
  - Federal division: Hawke

Population
  - Total: 244 (2021 census)
- Postcode: 3429
Localities around Wildwood
Sunbury	Clarkefield	Clarkefield
Sunbury	Wildwood	Oaklands Junction
Bulla	Bulla	Oaklands Junction

Wildwood is a locality in Victoria, Australia, 31 km (19 mi) north-west of Melbourne's central business district, located within the City of Hume local government area. Wildwood recorded a population of 244 at the 2021 census.

Wildwood is bounded by Konagaderra Road in the north, by Emu Creek in the west, Deep Creek in the east and by the point of confluence of the streams in the south.

== See also ==
- Shire of Bulla – Wildwood was previously within this former local government area.
