= Somerton, Victoria =

Somerton
- Suburb
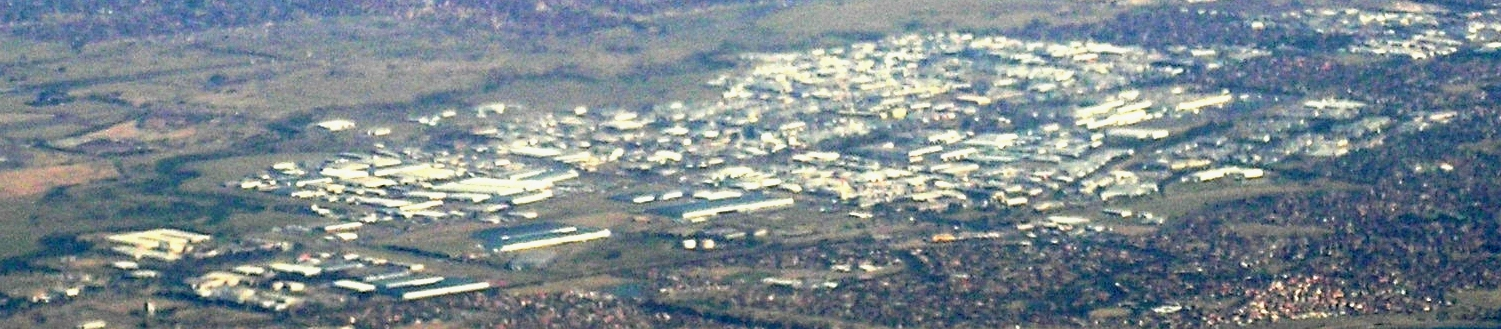
- Aerial view from north west

- Interactive map of Somerton
- Coordinates: 37.633°S 144.950°E
- Country: Australia
- State: Victoria
- City: Melbourne
- LGA: City of Hume
- Location: 21 km (13 mi) N of Melbourne

Government
  - State electorate: Greenvale
  - Federal divisions: Calwell; Scullin

Area
  - Total: 5.4 km^{2} (2.1 sq mi)

Population
  - Total: 6 (2021 census)
  - Density: 1.11/km^{2} (2.88/sq mi)
- Postcode: 3062
Suburbs around Somerton
Roxburgh Park	Craigieburn	Epping
Roxburgh Park	Somerton	Epping
Coolaroo	Campbellfield	Epping

Somerton is a suburb in Melbourne, Victoria, Australia, 21 km (13 mi) north of Melbourne's Central Business District, located within the City of Hume local government area. Somerton recorded a population of 6 at the 2021 census.

Somerton is predominantly an industrial and business suburb, and has a number of industrial parks, including the Austrak Business Park, Somerton Logistics Centre and the Northgate Distribution Centre. It is bounded by Patullos Lane in the north, the Merri Creek in the east, Somerton Road/Cooper Street in the south and the Craigieburn/North East railway lines in the west.

== History ==
The origin of Somerton's name is unclear, however records from 1847 show a "Summerton Inn". It may have also been named after Somers Town in London, England.

Somerton Post Office first opened on 1 January 1854 and closed in 1864. It reopened in 1892, some time after the railway line opened and again closed in 1966. In 1994, the Somerton Business and Delivery Centre opened.

== Transport ==
=== Bus ===
Two bus routes service Somerton:

- 532 : Craigieburn station – Broadmeadows station via Upfield station, operated by CDC Melbourne
- SmartBus 901 : Frankston station – Melbourne Airport, operated by Kinetic Melbourne

=== Train ===
Roxburgh Park station, on the Craigieburn line, and Upfield station, on the Upfield line, are the nearest railway stations to Somerton. Somerton railway station opened in 1881 and closed to passengers in 1960. A crossing loop on the Melbourne – Sydney standard gauge line and an adjacent rail yard retain the Somerton name.

== See also ==
- City of Whittlesea – Parts of Somerton were previously within this local government area.
- Shire of Bulla – Parts of Somerton were previously within this former local government area.
