= Oaklands Junction =

- Town
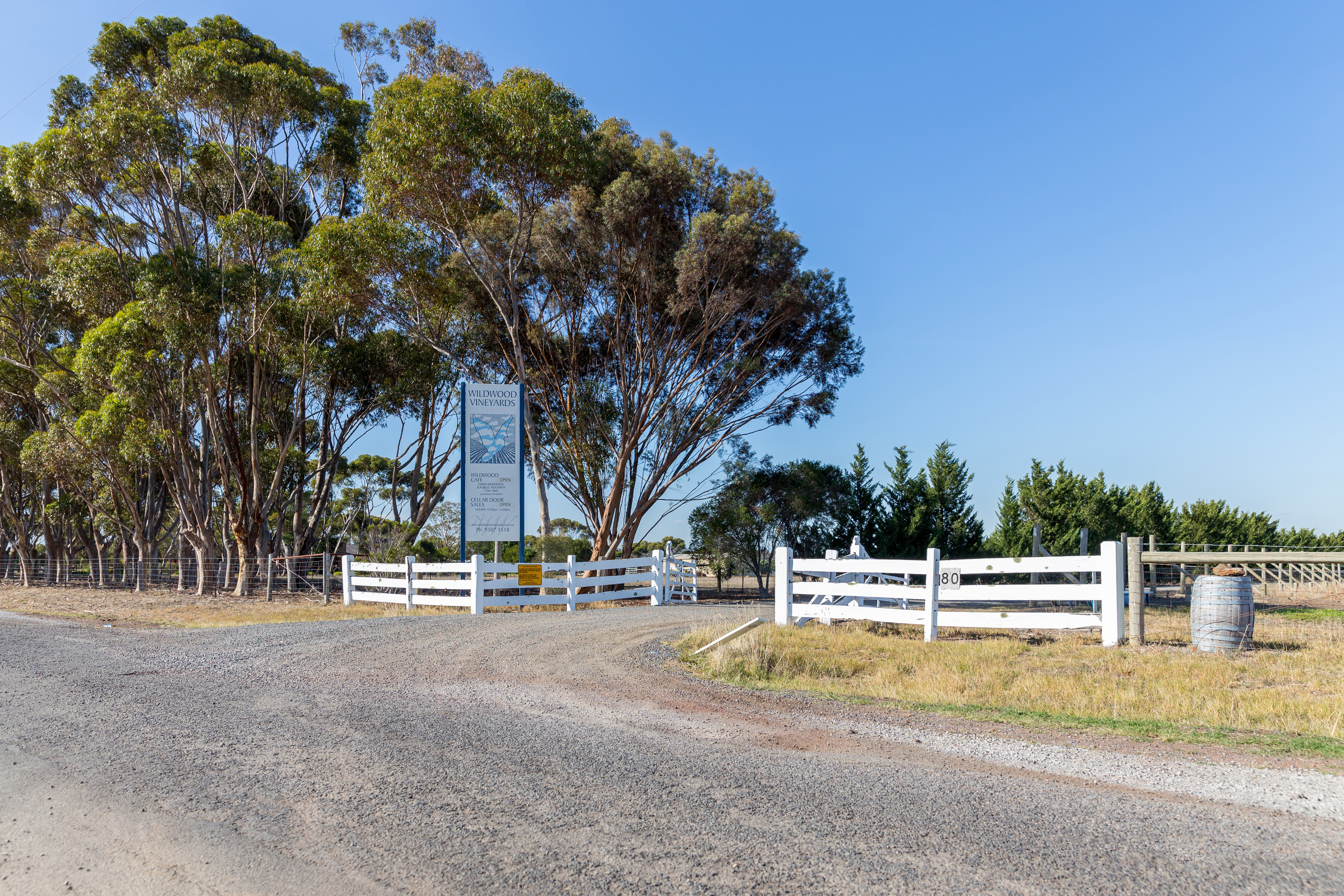
- Wildwood Vineyards, Oaklands Junction

- Interactive map of Oaklands Junction
- Coordinates: 37.6300°S 144.837°E
- Country: Australia
- State: Victoria
- City: Melbourne
- LGA: City of Hume
- Location: 25 km (16 mi) NW of Melbourne; 11 km (6.8 mi) NE of Sunbury

Government
  - State electorate: Kalkallo
  - Federal divisions: Calwell; Hawke

Population
  - Total: 439 (2021 census)
- Postcode: 3063
Localities around Oaklands Junction
Wildwood	Clarkefield	Mickleham
Wildwood	Oaklands Junction	Yuroke
Bulla	Greenvale	Greenvale

Oaklands Junction is a bounded locality in Melbourne, Victoria, Australia, 25 km (16 mi) north-west of Melbourne's Central Business District, located within the City of Hume local government area. Oaklands Junction recorded a population of 439 at the 2021 census.

Oaklands Junction is located beyond the Melbourne metropolitan Urban Growth Boundary.

== History ==
Oaklands Junction appears to get its name from the Oaklands Hunt Club, which was established in 1888.

Oaklands Junction Post Office opened on 1 January 1865 and closed in 1971.

Oaklands Park, a housing estate located on Konagaderra Road in the north-east corner of the suburb, was constructed in 1997.

== See also ==
- Shire of Bulla – Oaklands Junction was previously within this former local government area.
