= Craigieburn, Victoria =

Craigieburn
- Suburb
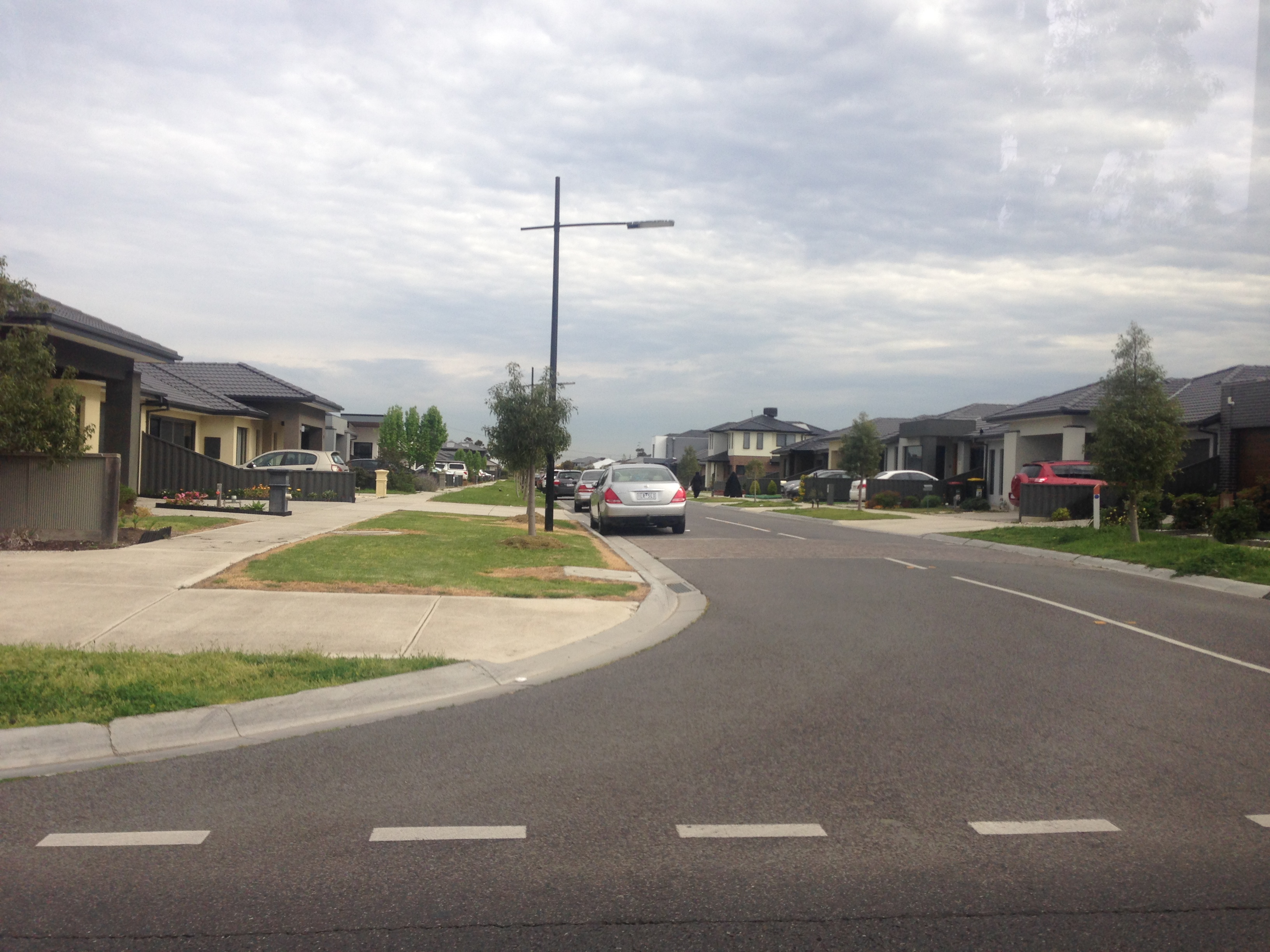
- Houses in Craigieburn

- Interactive map of Craigieburn
- Coordinates: 37.594°S 144.934°E
- Country: Australia
- State: Victoria
- City: Melbourne
- LGA: City of Hume
- Location: 25 km (16 mi) N of Melbourne

Government
  - State electorate: Kalkallo Greenvale
  - Federal divisions: Calwell; Scullin

Area
  - Total: 11.3 km^{2} (4.4 sq mi)
- Elevation: 203 m (666 ft)

Population
  - Total: 65,178 (2021 census)
  - Density: 5,768/km^{2} (14,940/sq mi)
- Postcode: 3064
Suburbs around Craigieburn
| Mickleham | Mickleham | Donnybrook; Kalkallo |
| Mickleham | Craigieburn | Wollert |
| Greenvale; Yuroke | Greenvale; Roxburgh Park | Epping; Somerton |

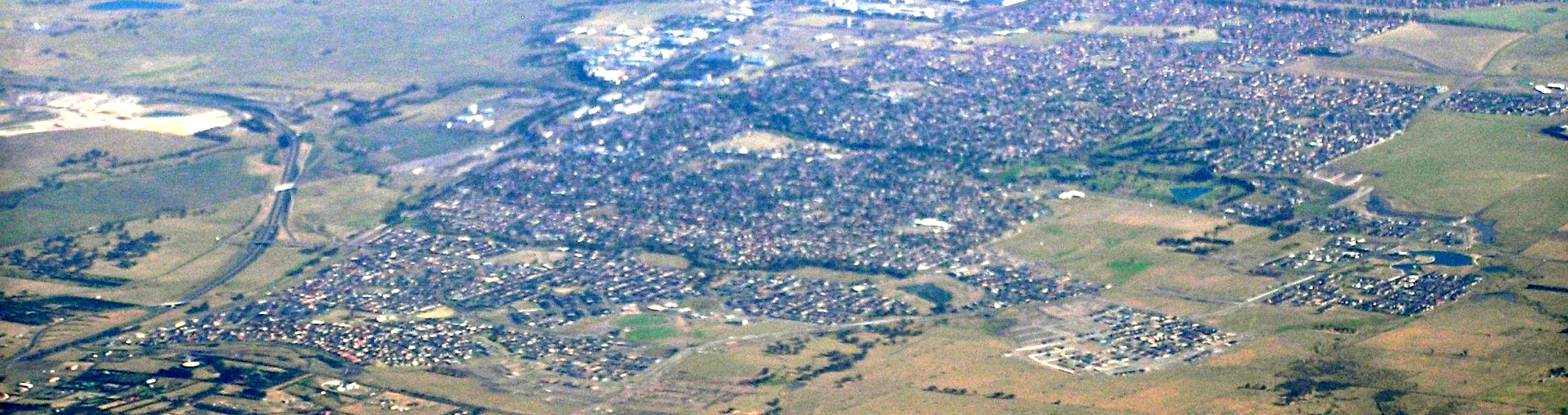
Aerial view of Craigieburn

Craigieburn is a suburb in Melbourne, Victoria, Australia, 25 km (16 mi) north of Melbourne's Central Business District, located within the City of Hume local government area. Craigieburn recorded a population of 65,178 at the 2021 census.

Craigieburn is a satellite suburb located on the urban-rural fringe of Melbourne, ranging from the lower half of Bridgewater Road to Mount Ridley. A large majority of the suburb is more than 200 metres above sea level, with Mount Ridley being the northernmost hill in northwestern metropolitan Melbourne with clear views of Melbourne's central business district 29.7km away.

Craigieburn is bounded by Mount Ridley Road, the Hume Freeway and Donnybrook Road in the north, Merri Creek in the east, Patullos Lane, the Craigieburn/North East railway line and a line that borders Roxburgh Park and Greenvale in the south, and Mickleham Road, Craigieburn Road and a line running north–south that borders Mickleham in the west.

== History ==
Craigieburn's first people were the Wurundjeri people.

The suburb takes its name from an old bluestone inn (its site located directly opposite modern day Kingswood Drive) that catered for travellers along the Old Sydney Road. The name is derived from the Gaelic word Craigie, meaning craggy and Scots word burn that means stream.

By 1865, Craigieburn was a small hamlet with a number of farmers, with its surrounding land unsuitable for agriculture. Craigieburn Post Office opened on 26 February 1866.

In 1872, the North East railway line to Seymour opened, with a station at Craigieburn opening in that year. The hamlet still remained of little importance, although a recreation hall was built by 1912. At that time, fishing and scenery in the Merri Creek (Craigieburn's eastern boundary) was noted.

In the 1920s, a brick facade near the railway station was erected, intended for a harvester factory which was never completed. Post World War II, a primary school opened in 1955, but was moved in 2003 replacing the school at Somerton. In 1961, the Hume Highway overpass near the railway station opened, replacing a previous level crossing.

In 1972, the Hothlyn Corporation started construction of a residential subdivision, marking the start of suburbanisation in Craigieburn. Wilmott Park Golf Course (Craigieburn Golf Club) opened in 1974. The Craigieburn Plaza Shopping Centre opened in 1975, Craigieburn Leisure Centre (Sports Stadium) opened in 1979, the Reserve Bank's Note Printing Branch in 1980, Mitford Crescent Kindergarten And Maternal Health opened in 1980, Craigieburn Secondary College and Craigieburn South Primary School opened in stages the first one in 1984 and the rest was completed in 1990 and within a few years there was a Catholic primary school, community health centre, several reserves and a public golf course. By 1991, the population was over 10,000 due to large housing growth.

In 2005, the Hume Highway bypassed Craigieburn with the opening of the Craigieburn Bypass.

== Demographics ==
In the 2021 census, there were 65,178 people in Craigieburn.

=== Country of birth ===
According to ABS Census 2006 data, 71.9% of those in Craigieburn were born in Australia; 1.9% were born in England; 1.9%, in Sri Lanka; 1.8%, in Italy; 1.5%, in New Zealand; 1.2%, in Iraq; and 3.9%, in India. In the ABS Census of 2011 the percentage of residents born in Australia had dropped to 61.4% and the other top responses were Iraq; 5.1%, India; 3.7%, Turkey; 3.4%, Italy; 2.4% and Sri Lanka; 2.3%; Pakistan.

In the 2016 census, 53.0% of people were born in Australia. The next most common countries of birth were India 11.3%, Iraq 5.4%, Sri Lanka 2.9%, New Zealand 2.8% and Philippines 1.9%.

=== Language ===
44.2% of people spoke only English at home. Other languages spoken at home included Punjabi 7.8%, Arabic 4.6%, Turkish 4.6%, Sinhalese 3.4% and Hindi 3.3%.

=== Religion ===
The most common responses for religion in Craigieburn (State Suburbs) were Catholic 28.4%, No Religion 15.5%, Islam 11.9%, Not Stated 7.7% and Sikhism 7.2%.

== Notable people ==
- Joe Korp
- Jake Bilardi

== Facilities ==
=== Sport and recreation ===
- Australian rules football is popular in Craigieburn. A local team, the Craigieburn Football Club, plays in the Essendon District Football League, and is based at D.S. Aitken Reserve. AFL club Richmond Football Club has its second training base facility at Highgate Reserve on Grand Boulevard. The Tigers held a community camp in 2009 in the suburb. Richmond's VFL affiliate, the Coburg Tigers, played three home games there in 2010. The Calder Cannons, who compete in the Victorian statewide Under-18 competition, are also based there.
- A soccer club, Craigieburn City FC, have their home ground at Vic Foster Reserve, with teams from juniors to reserves. The senior men's team currently compete in the FFV State League 3 North West Division.
- A rugby league club, formed in 2008 as the Craigieburn Phoenix, but now known as the Hume City Bulldogs, are based at Hothlyn Drive Reserve and play in the Victorian Rugby League competition.
- Golfers play at the Craigieburn Golf Club on the Craigieburn Public Golf Course, or at the Willmott Park Golf Club on Craigieburn Road West.
- The Craigieburn Sports Stadium is one of the major community based recreation facilities, fully owned and operated by the Hume City Council. The leisure centre is also the home of the Craigieburn Eagles Basketball Team.
- State Swim operate a swimming centre at 87 Grand Boulevard, focusing on teaching children (from 6 months of age to teenagers) to swim.
- Six tennis courts and a community hall are located on the western side of D.S. Aitken Reserve, on Selwyn Avenue.
- The Craigieburn Bowling Club is located at 245 Craigieburn Road West.
- A skate bowl is located at the south eastern corner of D.S. Aitken Reserve.
- A BMX Track is located behind the Craigieburn Sports Stadium, with available parking near the childcare centre.
- Craigieburn has at least 15 kilometres of hike and bike trails.
- The Craigieburn Sporting Club is located at the Craigieburn Public Golf Course on Craigieburn Road.
- There are many dance schools operating within the suburb, one of the oldest of which is Craigieburn School of Dance (founded in 1994).

=== Commerce and industry ===
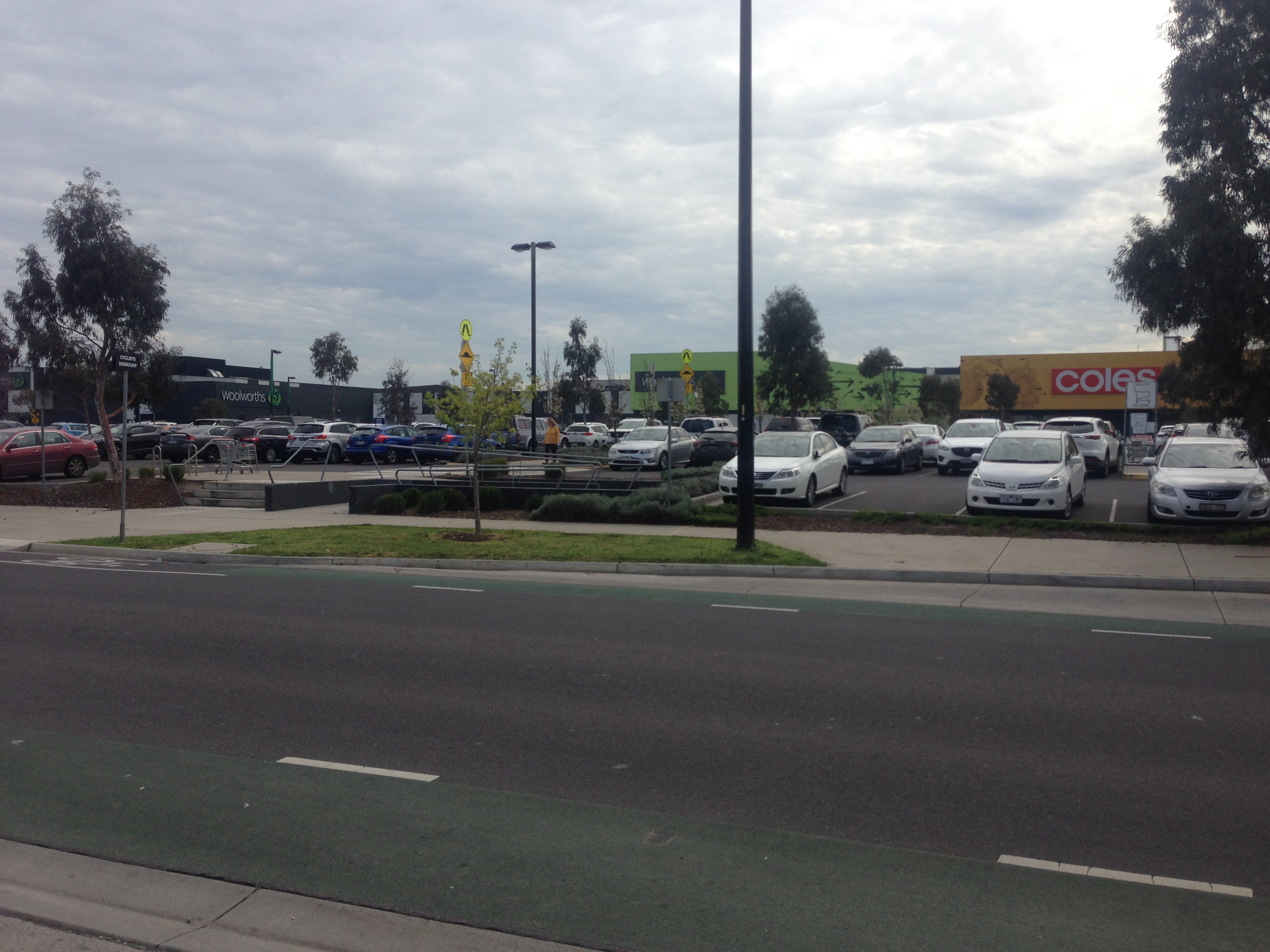
Eastern side of Craigieburn Central

- Craigieburn Central, located on the corner of Aitken Boulevard and Craigieburn Road, serves as the area's major retail precinct and first opened for trade in October 2013. Tenants in this centre include Big W and Kmart discount department stores, Woolworths, Coles and Aldi supermarkets, United Cinemas and approximately 160 specialty stores. Target closed its store in the centre in early 2021 and transitioned into the new Kmart store.
- Stockland completed the construction of the Highlands Shopping Centre on the corner of Aitken and Grand Boulevards (Highlands Estate) in November 2011. This shopping precinct includes a Woolworths supermarket, Jetts Fitness, café, pharmacy, butchery, Subway and other specialty shops.
- Craigieburn Plaza Shopping Centre is located on the corner of Hanson Road and Craigieburn Road, and opened in 1975. It includes a Woolworths, dentist, tax agent, halal butcher and several other specialty shops. Located further north in the Delfin estate on Mareeba Way is a small shopping centre containing a Chemist Warehouse, doctors surgery, café, bakery, general store and other fast food outlets. It opened In 2009.
- An industrial estate is currently being developed on the eastern side of the Hume Highway, and a Metro Trains Melbourne maintenance and cleaning facility is now completed between the highway and the rail line north of Craigieburn railway station. The Reserve Bank of Australia Note Printing Works is also located in Craigieburn.
- MAB has planned a new city called Merrifield, 5 km (3.1 mi) north of Craigieburn, a master planned mixed-use development, consisting of residential, commercial and business precincts.

=== Community ===
- A 24-hour police station and a fire station are located opposite D.S. Aitken Reserve.
- The Craigieburn Youth Centre is located adjacent to the Craigieburn Leisure Centre.
- Craigieburn Health Service, a public health service provider run by Northern Health, is on Craigieburn Road, immediately west of McDonald's.
- There is also a medical centre on Grand Boulevard, known as Highlands Medical Centre, located at the Highlands Shopping Centre.

=== Hume Global Learning Centre ===
On 7 May 2012, the new Hume Global Learning Centre was opened. The two-storey centre is home to the Craigieburn Library, a café, gallery, occasional childcare facilities and Council's Craigieburn Customer Service Centre on the ground level, and a conference and training centre on level one.

The old Craigieburn Library and Council's Customer Service Centre at Craigieburn Road are now relocated to the new building. In August 2014, the new Craigieburn Library won the best new public library of the year. The prize, which was established by the Danish Agency for Culture and sponsored by the Danish architecture firm Schmidt Hammer Lassen architects, was awarded at the annual meeting of the IFLA (The International Federation of Library Associations and Institutions) in Lyon, France.

The award is a part of the Model Programme for Public Libraries project of the Danish Agency for Culture and Realdania, which has motivated municipalities to develop the library of the future, so that it is prepared to incorporate, among other things, digital developments and local culture and accommodate diverse population groups with an open and functional architectural expression in balance with its surroundings.

== Residential areas ==
Highlands Craigieburn, a residential development by Stockland, is the largest development in Craigieburn. Other major residential estates have been developed in Craigieburn by Delfin, Peet Limited (Aston), Evolve Development (Annadale) and Villawood (Trilium).

== Education ==
- Craigieburn Primary School
- Craigieburn South Primary School
- Aitken Creek Primary School
- Willmott Park Primary School
- Our Lady's Catholic Primary School
- Mother Teresa Catholic Primary School
- Craigieburn Secondary College
- Newbury Primary School
- Aitken Hill Primary School
- Elevation Secondary College
- Oscar Romero Catholic Primary School
- Mount Ridley P-12 College
- Hume Anglican Grammar

== Transport ==
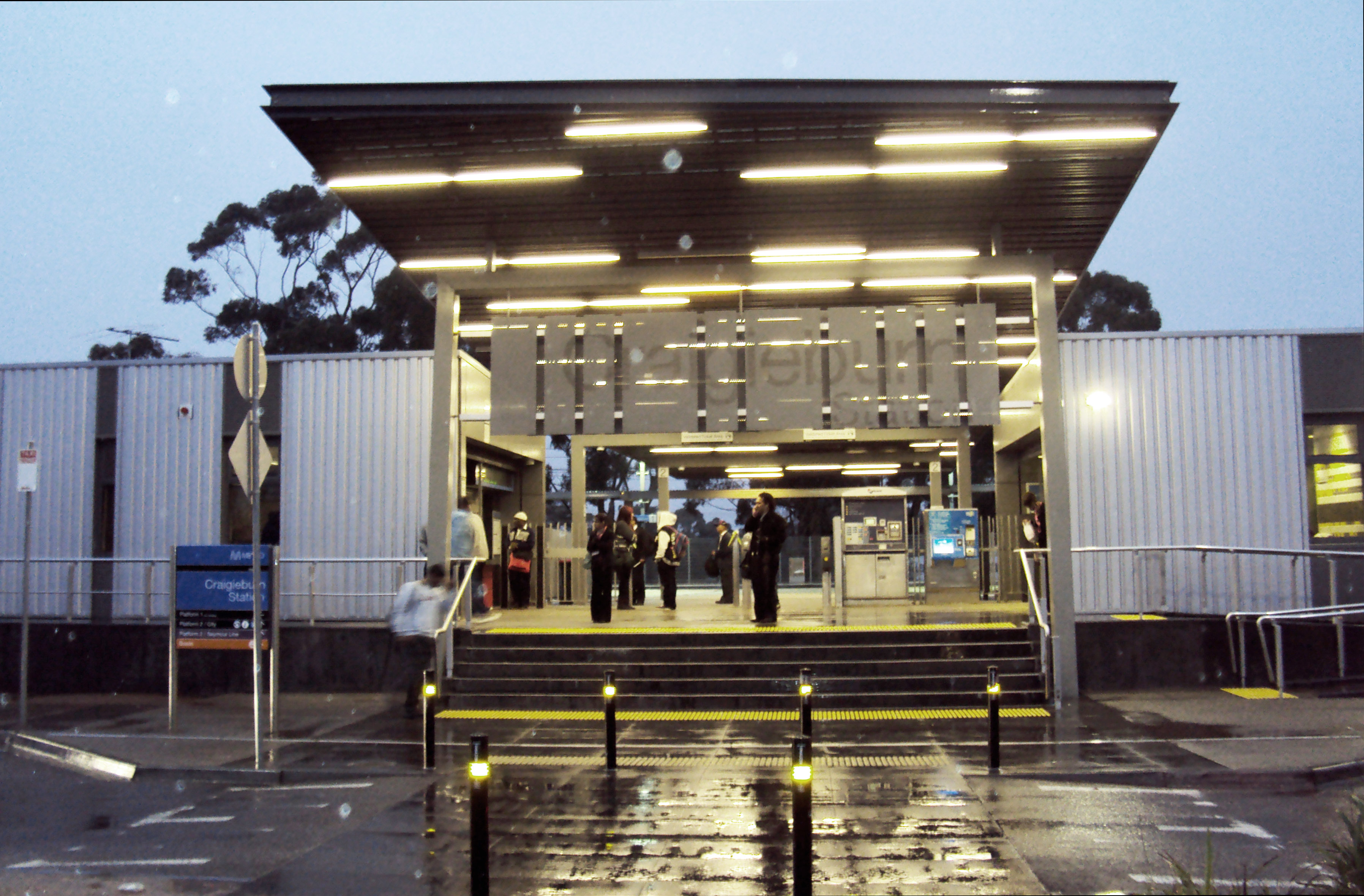
Craigieburn train station

=== Bus ===
Ten bus routes service Craigieburn:

- 390 : Mernda station – Craigieburn station via Wollert, operated by Dysons
- 525 : Donnybrook station – Craigieburn station via Mickleham, operated by Dysons
- 528 : Craigieburn station – Craigieburn Central Shopping Centre, operated by CDC Melbourne
- 529 : Craigieburn station – Craigieburn North via Craigieburn Central Shopping Centre, operated by CDC Melbourne
- 532 : Craigieburn station – Broadmeadows station via Upfield station, operated by
- 533 : Craigieburn – Craigieburn North via Hanson Road, perated by CDC Melbourne
- 537 : Craigieburn station – Craigieburn West via Craigieburn Central Shopping Centre, operated by CDC Melbourne
- 541 : Broadmeadows station – Craigieburn North. Operated by Dysons.
- 544 : Craigieburn station – Roxburgh Park station, operated by CDC Melbourne
- Night Bus 953 : Broadmeadows station – Craigieburn via Meadow Heights (operates Saturday and Sunday mornings only), operated by Ventura Bus Lines

=== Cycling ===
For cyclists, Craigieburn is at the start of the Galada Tamboore Cycle Path, which follows the Hume Freeway 14.7 km (9.1 mi) south to meet the Western Ring Road Trail at Thomastown.

=== Train ===
Craigieburn is served by Craigieburn railway station, which is the terminus of the Craigieburn line. Electrified railway services to the station commenced on 30 September 2007. Craigieburn was previously serviced by V/Line five-car diesel locomotives and Sprinter railcars on the Seymour / Albury line. The previous terminus was Broadmeadows station. In 2018, internal Department of Transport plans to through-route the Craigieburn line with the Frankston line were accidentally released.

== See also ==
- Shire of Bulla – Craigieburn was previously within this former local government area.
