= Yuroke =

- Town
- Interactive map of Yuroke
- Coordinates: 37.600°S 144.880°E
- Country: Australia
- State: Victoria
- City: Melbourne
- LGA: City of Hume
- Location: 26 km (16 mi) NW of Melbourne; 6 km (3.7 mi) W of Craigieburn

Government
  - State electorate: Kalkallo
  - Federal division: Calwell
- Elevation: 240 m (790 ft)

Population
  - Total: 123 (2021 census)
- Postcode: 3063
Localities around Yuroke
Oaklands Junction	Mickleham	Mickleham
Oaklands Junction	Yuroke	Craigieburn; Mickleham
Oaklands Junction	Greenvale	Greenvale

Yuroke is a locality in Victoria, Australia, 26 km (16 mi) north-west of Melbourne's Central Business District, located within the City of Hume local government area. Yuroke recorded a population of 123 at the 2021 census.

Yuroke is located adjacent to the Melbourne Metropolitan Area, beyond the Urban Growth Boundary. It is located between Mickleham and Greenvale, on Mickleham Road.

== History ==
Yuroke gets its name from an Indigenous word, "Eurok Iguana", the meaning of which remains unclear.

Yuroke Post Office opened around 1902 and closed in 1975.

Yuroke was the filming location for Melbourne band Painters & Dockers' single Nude School.

== See also ==
- Shire of Bulla – Yuroke was previously within this former local government area.
- former Electoral district of Yuroke
