= Bulla, Victoria =

Bulla
- Suburb
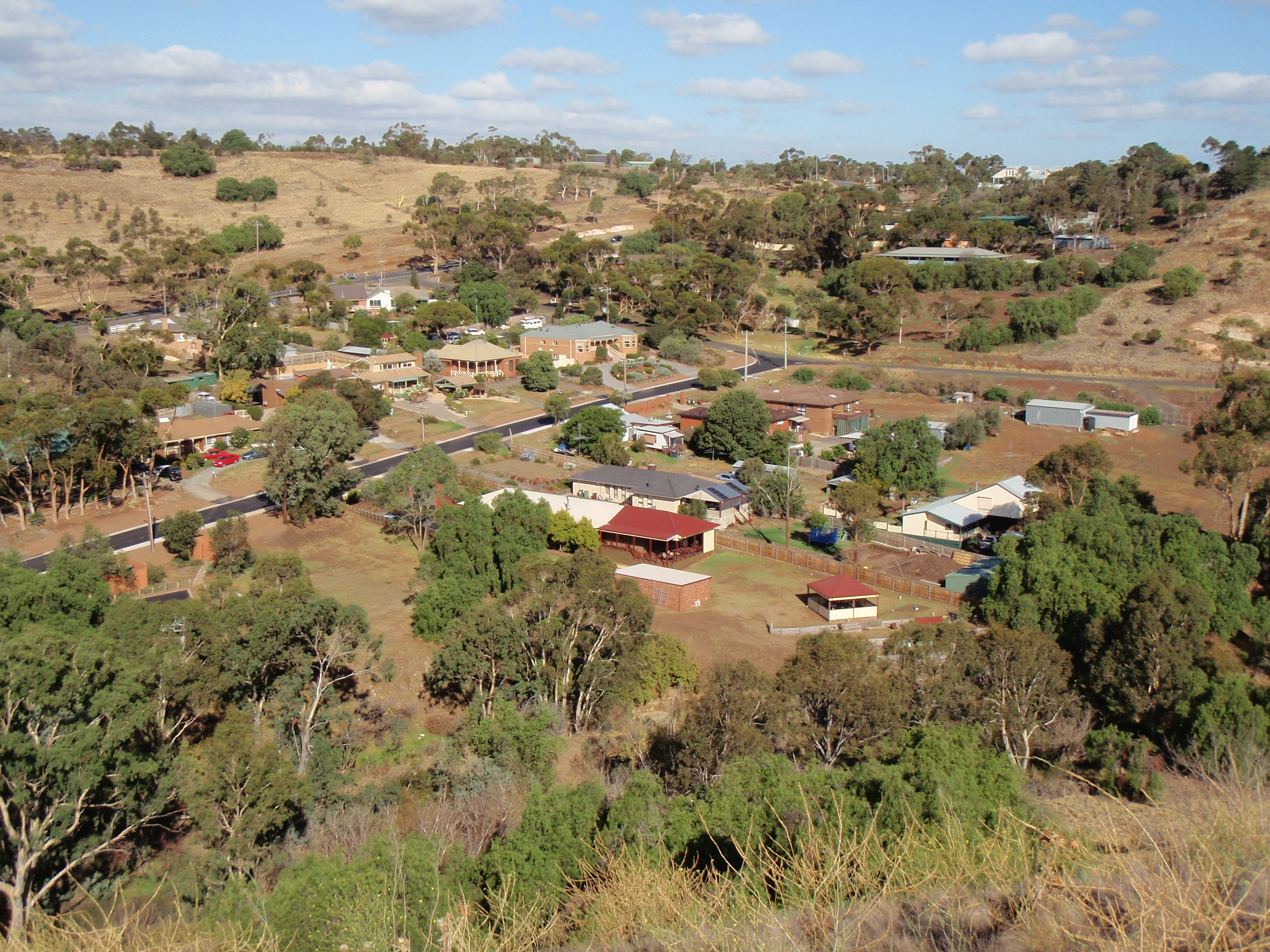
- View of Bulla and the Deep Creek valley

- Interactive map of Bulla
- Coordinates: 37°38′13″S 144°48′11″E
- Country: Australia
- State: Victoria
- LGA: City of Hume
- Location: 23 km (14 mi) NW of Melbourne; 4 km (2.5 mi) NW of Melbourne Airport; 9 km (5.6 mi) SE of Sunbury
- Established: 1850s

Government
  - State electorate: Sunbury
  - Federal division: Hawke
- Elevation: 129 m (423 ft)

Population
  - Total: 668 (2021 census)
- Postcode: 3428
Suburbs around Bulla
Sunbury	Wildwood	Oaklands Junction
Diggers Rest	Bulla	Greenvale
Keilor North	Keilor North	Melbourne Airport

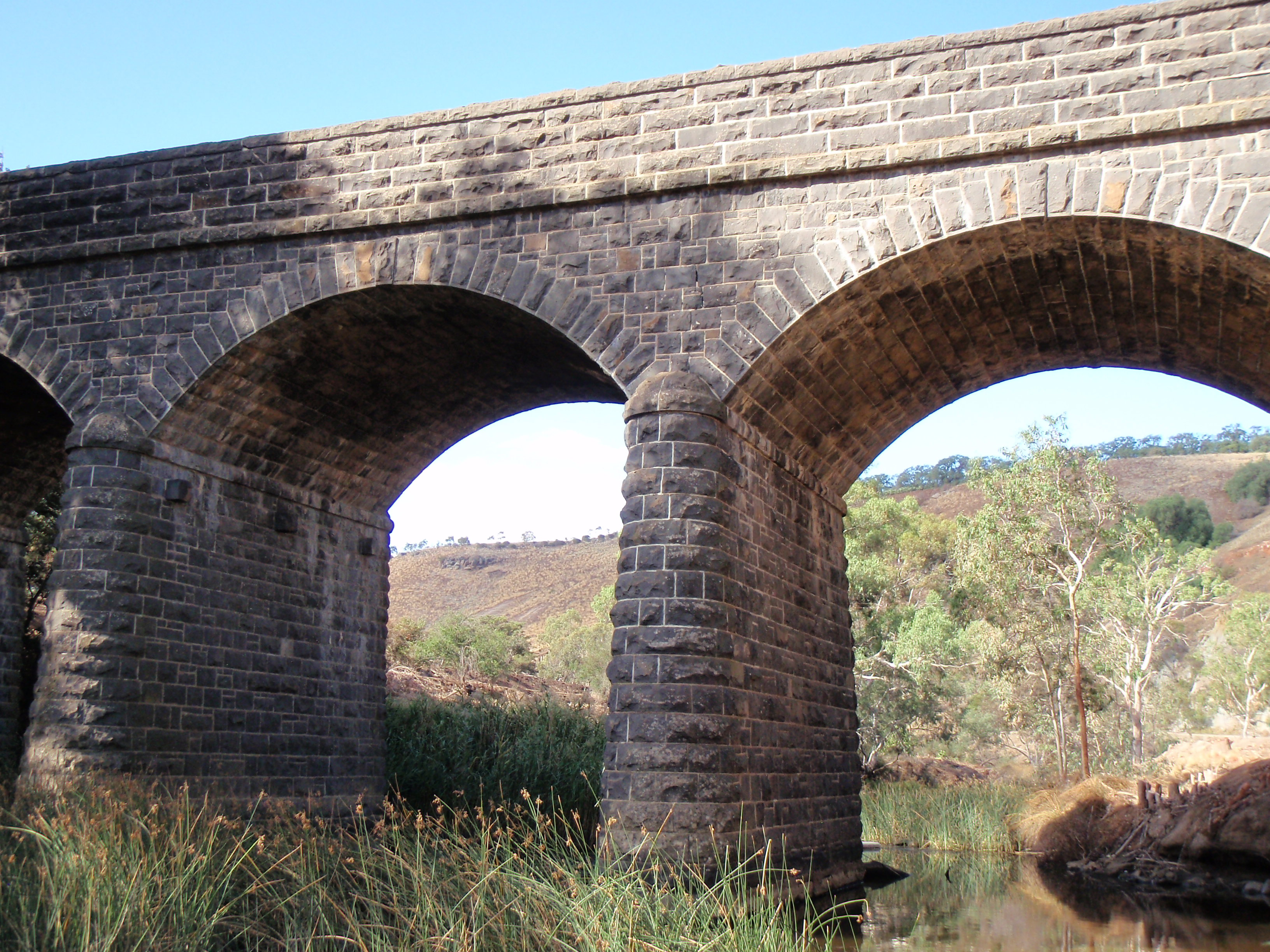
Bulla Bridge, built 1869

Bulla is a town in Victoria, Australia, 23 kilometres (14 mi) north-west of Melbourne's Central Business District, located within the City of Hume local government area. Bulla recorded a population of 668 at the 2021 census.

Bulla is located adjacent to the Melbourne metropolitan area. Deep Creek, a tributary of the Maribyrnong River, flows through the township.

== History ==
The word Bulla is of indigenous Australian origins meaning 'two'. It was first settled by William "Tulip" Wright, the former chief constable of Melbourne in 1843. In 1851 the village was surveyed. A flour mill, brickworks and pottery works were built to exploit local kaolinite reserves, and facilities were quickly erected to serve the local population, including several churches (two of which are now listed by the National Trust), a school, general store, and from 1862, council offices.

Bulla Post Office opened on 1 March 1851, but was known as Bulla Bulla until 1854.

At the time it was the largest town in the region, but competition from Sunbury limited the growth of the town. In 1956, the Bulla Shire Council (now part of the City of Hume following amalgamation in 1994) moved to Sunbury, and in 1996, the Kennett Liberal government closed the primary school.

In 1910, the Bulla Cream Company took up dairy farming in the area, transporting the cream by horse and cart to their processing facility at Moonee Ponds in suburban Melbourne.

== Present day ==
The town centre of Bulla contains a large reserve which includes a sports centre, tennis club and community centre. This reserve is home to the Tullamarine Live Steam Society, who maintain a miniature railway which is open to the public on the first and third Sunday afternoon of each month, with a monthly market on the third Sunday between 9 am and 3 pm with train rides all day. It also contains hotel-motel accommodation and a country fire station.

The ABS reported in 2001 that 12% of the town's residents are of Italian descent. A Calabria Club is located on Uniting Lane.

Next to the former Shire's bluestone hall in the main street of Bulla is the Alister Clark Memorial Rose Garden. Alister Clark, who was the Shire's president several times and whose house 'Glenara' lies on Deep Creek in the old Shire of Bulla, was the most prolific and best known of Australian rose breeders. The garden, created and maintained by local volunteers, has a nearly complete collection of his surviving roses.

== Transport ==
Bus route 479 passes through Bulla. It operates between Westfield Airport West shopping centre and Sunbury railway station.

== See also ==
- Shire of Bulla – Bulla was previously within this former local government area.
- List of reduplicated Australian place names
