= Greenvale, Victoria =

Greenvale
- Suburb
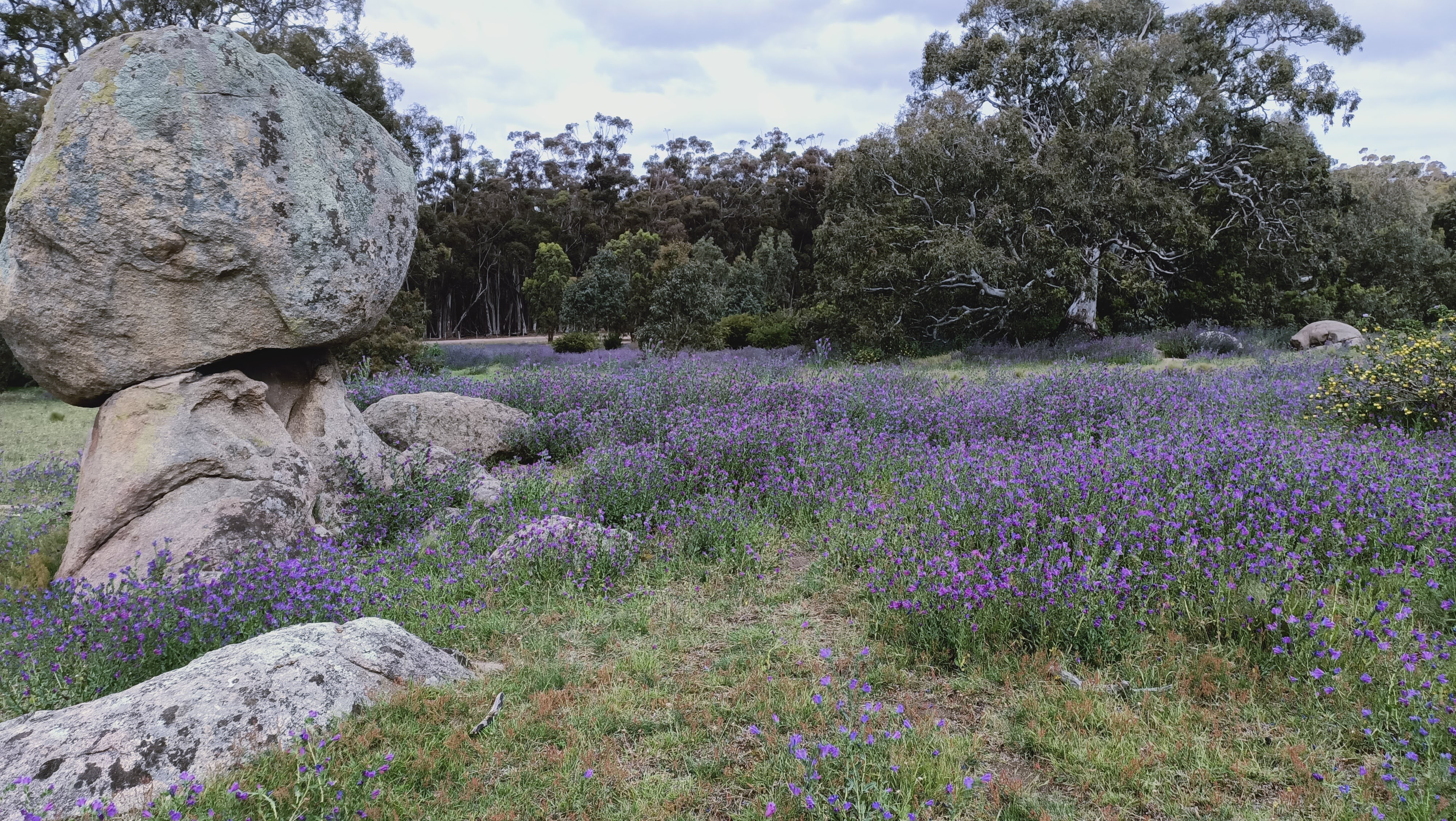
- Woodlands Historic Park in Greenvale serves as a native animal sanctuary, Wurundjeri heritage site, and public walking space, dotted with historical early settlement ruins.

- Coordinates: 37.633°S 144.883°E
- Country: Australia
- State: Victoria
- City: Melbourne
- LGA: City of Hume
- Location: 20 km (12 mi) N of Melbourne; 5 km (3.1 mi) NW of Broadmeadows
- Established: 1980s

Government
  - State electorate: Greenvale
  - Federal division: Calwell

Area
  - Total: 6.7 km^{2} (2.6 sq mi)
- Elevation: 159 m (522 ft)

Population
  - Total: 21,274 (2021 census)
  - Density: 3,175/km^{2} (8,220/sq mi)
- Postcode: 3059
Suburbs around Greenvale
Oaklands Junction	Craigieburn; Yuroke	Roxburgh Park
Bulla	Greenvale	Meadow Heights; Roxburgh Park
Melbourne Airport	Attwood	Meadow Heights

Greenvale is a suburb in Melbourne, Victoria, Australia, 20 km (12 mi) north of Melbourne's Central Business District, located within the City of Hume local government area. Greenvale recorded a population of 21,274 at the 2021 census.

Greenvale is located between Yuroke and Attwood, on Mickleham Road.

== History ==
Greenvale gets it name from a farm named "Greenvale", owned by local farmer John McKerchar. It was located in the parish of Yuroke, from which the area first took its name.

Greenvale Post Office originally opened in a rural area on 1 January 1871 and closed in 1969. As the suburb developed the post office reopened in 1996.

Although subdivisions began in 1972, Greenvale expanded largely in the 1980s and now has two shopping centres, three primary schools, a community centre and two kindergartens. Greenvale has a privately owned school called Aitken College. Greenvale Reservoir in the north was built in 1973.

=== Greenvale Sanatorium ===
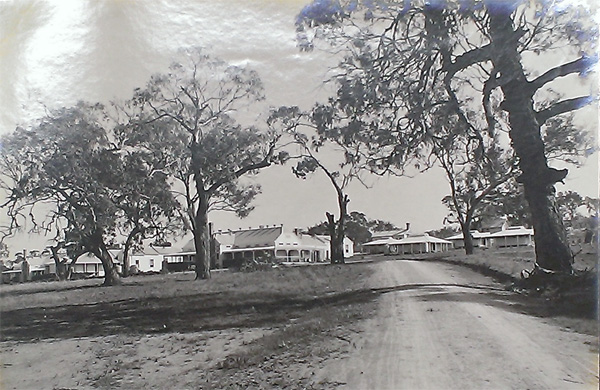
Greenvale Sanatorium from the main approach, after 1906 (Mitchell library Q725.5)

Greenvale Sanatorium was built in 1905, consisting of weatherboard buildings and quarantine huts, primarily for patients in reduced circumstances, and was appropriately isolated from the general public by the Victorian Government under the administration of the Health Department for the treatment of tuberculosis and other diseases.

A two-storey brick hospital, named the Percy Everett Building, was added to the site in 1940, with the original weatherboard buildings and huts demolished in 1973. In 1956, due to tuberculosis facilities becoming redundant thanks to effective treatments, the site became an aged care facility. Its doors finally closed in 1998, and the land it stood on was sold in 2004 to form part of Woodlands Historic Park. The building was fully demolished by the end of 2006.

== Education ==
Greenvale's primary schools (Prep-6) include:

- Greenvale Primary School (public)
- Keelonith Primary School (public) (opened Term 1, 2021)
- Mary Queen of Heaven (private) (opened Term 1, 2023)
- St. Carlo Borromeo Primary School (private)
- Aitken College, Prep-12 (private)

Greenvale's secondary schools (7-12) include:

- Greenvale Secondary College (public) (opened Term 1, 2022)
- Kolbe Catholic College (private)
- Aitken College, Prep-12 (private)

== Demographics ==
The most common ancestries in Greenvale are 19.9% Italian, 13.9% Australian, 11.5% English, 5.9% Turkish and 3.9% Greek. Australian born citizens number 65% of residents. Other common countries of birth were Italy 4.5%, Iraq 3.1, Turkey 2.9%, Sri Lanka 1.7% and India 1.6%. English is the only language spoken at home by 52.8%. Other languages spoken at home included 9% Italian, 7.1% Turkish, 6.7% Arabic, 2.3% Greek and 2.3% Chaldean Neo-Aramaic. The most common responses for religion in Greenvale were 47.2% Roman Catholic, 12.8% Islam, 11.7% no religion, 6.4% Not stated and 6.1% Eastern Orthodox.

== Today ==
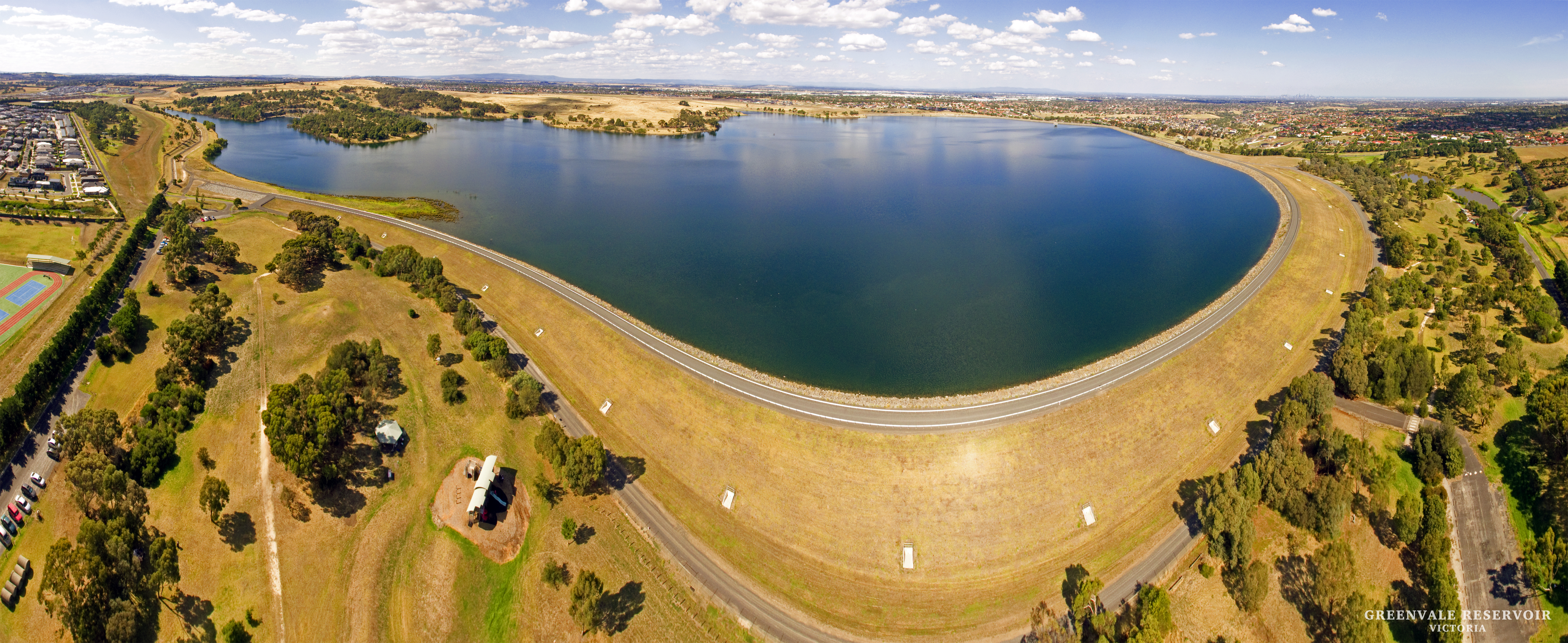
Greenvale Reservoir, 2017

Although positioned only ten minutes from Melbourne Airport, Greenvale has been up until recently known as a semi-rural area, characterised by larger farm holdings to the north of the town centre (past Somerton Road). Three of these farms (the one bordering Aitken College is known as "Hacienda") are now planned for development into a new housing estate. This will continue the trend for Greenvale in undergoing further residential development, with several new estates appearing in the suburb itself and in nearby areas, such as Attwood and Bulla. Greenvale is a mixture of old and new development. Older areas are referred to as "The Toorak of the North" (sic) for their grand and stately homes.

Greenvale is home to Living Legends - The International Home of Rest for Champion Horses - located at Woodlands Homestead in Woodlands Historic Park.

=== Greenvale Lakes ===
Greenvale Lakes is a housing estate located in the suburbs of Roxburgh Park and Greenvale, close to the Greenvale Reservoir. A new school has been built in Greenvale Lakes called Kolbe Catholic College Greenvale Lakes.

=== Aspect Greenvale ===
Aspect Greenvale is a housing estate located in Greenvale that overlooks the Greenvale Reservoir and the city skyline.

== Climate ==
Climate data for Greenvale Sanatorium
Month	Jan	Feb	Mar	Apr	May	Jun	Jul	Aug	Sep	Oct	Nov	Dec	Year
Mean daily maximum °C (°F)	26.2 (79.2)	26.3 (79.3)	23.4 (74.1)	19.5 (67.1)	15.6 (60.1)	13.2 (55.8)	12.5 (54.5)	13.9 (57.0)	16.8 (62.2)	19.4 (66.9)	21.5 (70.7)	25.0 (77.0)	19.4 (66.9)
Mean daily minimum °C (°F)	12.0 (53.6)	12.5 (54.5)	10.6 (51.1)	8.9 (48.0)	7.2 (45.0)	5.4 (41.7)	4.9 (40.8)	5.8 (42.4)	6.7 (44.1)	7.8 (46.0)	9.2 (48.6)	11.5 (52.7)	8.5 (47.3)
Average precipitation mm (inches)	43.8 (1.72)	50.3 (1.98)	41.3 (1.63)	54.1 (2.13)	45.9 (1.81)	43.6 (1.72)	40.2 (1.58)	46.1 (1.81)	58.2 (2.29)	57.8 (2.28)	55.2 (2.17)	58.2 (2.29)	593.9 (23.38)
Average precipitation days	8.4	7.1	7.8	11.6	13.3	13.6	15.3	15.4	14.5	12.6	11.6	9.5	140.7

== Sport ==
Greenvale Football Club, an Australian Rules football team, is one of the Essendon District Football League's most successful teams, having won the A Grade premiership twice. Their coach Steve MacPherson was, as of 2009, the longest serving coach of any side in the EDFL.

Greenvale also has a soccer club, Greenvale United SC. They currently have teams for Girl's Juniors, Boy's Juniors, Mixed MiniRoos and Men's Seniors. The Seniors took out the 2014 Men's State League 5 North division Title.

Other local sporting clubs include the Greenvale Tennis Club and the Greenvale Cricket Club.

== Transport ==
=== Bus ===
Three bus routes service Greenvale:

- 484 : Broadmeadows station – Roxburgh Park station via Greenvale. Operated by CDC Melbourne.
- 541 : Broadmeadows station – Craigieburn North (which services Kolbe Catholic College in Greenvale). Operated by Dysons.
- 543 : Greenvale Gardens – Roxburgh Park station via Greenvale Village Shopping Centre. Operated by CDC Melbourne.

=== Train ===
The nearest railway station to Greenvale is Roxburgh Park station. Broadmeadows station is also directly accessible by bus. Both stations are on the Craigieburn line.

== See also ==
- Shire of Bulla – Greenvale was previously within this former local government area.
