= City of Hume =

Coordinates: 37°41′S 144°55′E

- Local government area
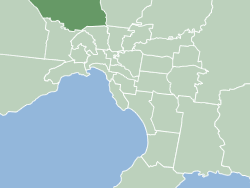
- Location within Melbourne metropolitan area

- Interactive map of City of Hume
- Country: Australia
- State: Victoria
- Region: Greater Melbourne
- Council seat: Broadmeadows

Government
  - Mayor: Carly Moore
  - State electorates: Broadmeadows; Greenvale; Kalkallo; Sunbury
  - Federal division: *Calwell; Hawke; Maribyrnong; McEwen; Scullin

Area
  - Total: 504 km^{2} (195 sq mi)

Population
  - Total: 243,901 (2021) (22nd)
  - Density: 483.9/km^{2} (1,253.4/sq mi)
- Website: City of Hume
LGAs around City of Hume
Macedon Ranges	Macedon Ranges	Mitchell
Melton	City of Hume	Whittlesea
Melton	Brimbank	Merri-bek

The City of Hume is a local government area located within the metropolitan area of Melbourne, Victoria, Australia. It includes the outer north-western suburbs, including the major centres of Broadmeadows, Craigieburn and Sunbury, as well as a number of rural localities between 13 and 40 kilometres from the Melbourne city centre. It has an area of 504 square kilometres, and in June 2018 it had a population of 224,394.

== History ==
The City was formed on 15 December 1994 after the amalgamation of the Shire of Bulla, most of the City of Broadmeadows and parts of the City of Keilor and City of Whittlesea.

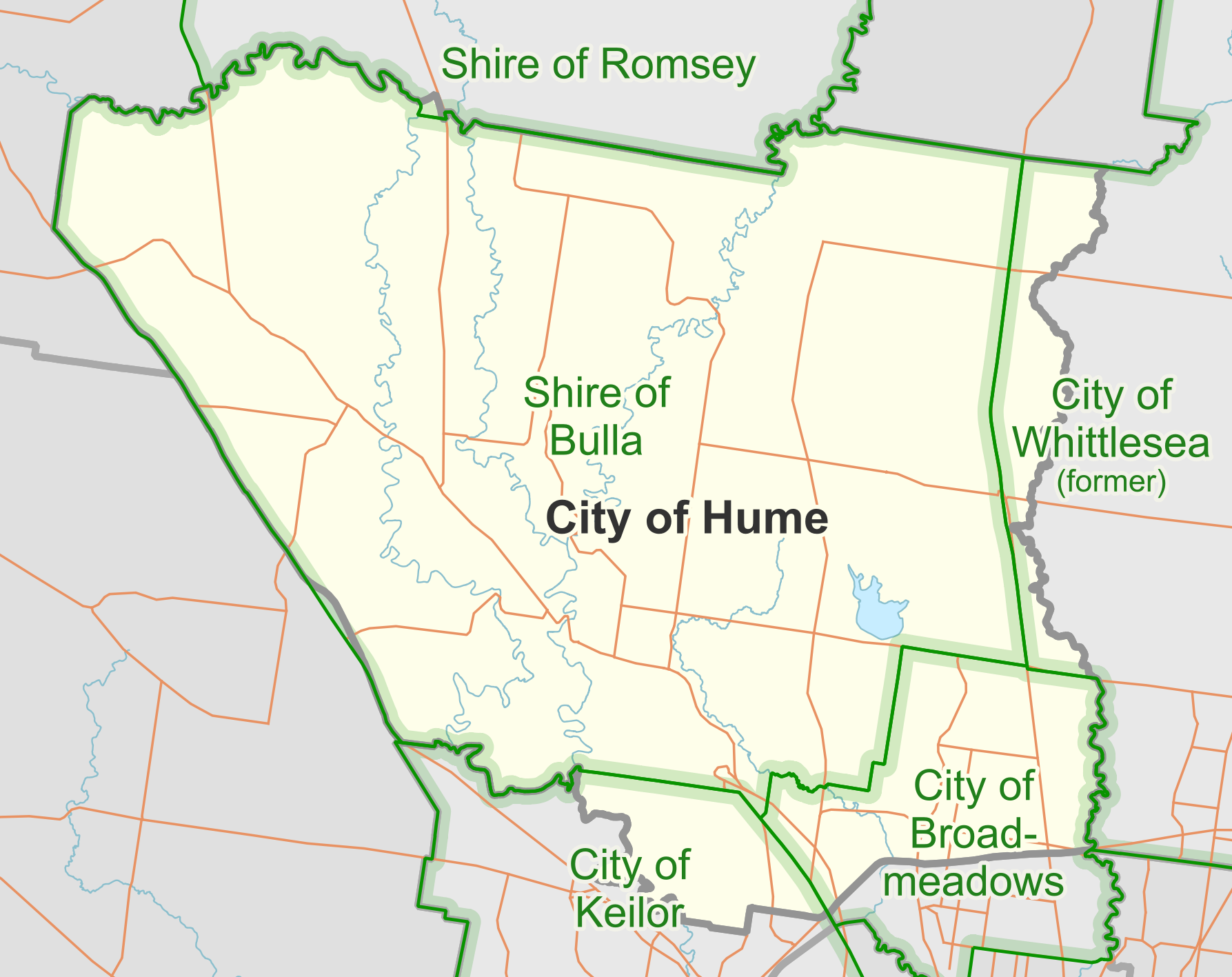
The City's predecessor LGAs (green) as they were in 1994

The City was Australia's first local government to introduce a Bill of Rights for its denizens in 2004, following the establishment of a Social Justice Charter in 2001. This Bill of Rights predates the State Government's Charter of Rights and Responsibilities by three years, and is more sweeping in that it explicitly includes economic, social, and cultural rights.

== Council ==
=== Mayors (1997– current) ===
No.	Mayor	No.	Deputy Mayor	Term
1	Carl Lewis	1	Bill Muir	1997-1998
2	Bill Muir	2	Dott White	1998–1999
3	Jack Ogilvie	3	Graeme Marr	1999–2000
4	Gary Jungwirth	4	Drew Jessop	2000–2001
5	Drew Jessop	5	Burhan Yigit	2001–2002
6	Ann Potter	6	Mohamad Abbouche	2002–2003
7	Burhan Yigit	7	Kevin Sheahan	2003–2004
8	Mohamad Abbouche	8	Gary Jungwirth	2004
9	Kevin Sheehan	9	Adem Atmaca	2004–2005
10	Adem Atmaca	10	Ann Potter	2005–2006
(4)	Gary Jungwirth	(4)	Drew Jessop	2006–2007
(8)	Mohamad Abbouche	11	Moya Kathryn	2007–2008
(3)	Jack Ogilvie	12	Ros Spence	2008–2009
11	Geoff Porter	(12)	Ros Spence	2009–2010
12	Helen Patsikatheodorou	(12)	Ros Spence	2010–2011
13	Ros Spence	13	Vic Dougall	2011-2012
(11)	Geoff Porter	14	Casey Nunn	2012–2013
14	Casey Nunn	(9)	Adem Atmaca	2013–2014
(10)	Adem Atmaca	15	Alan Bolton	2014–2015
(12)	Helen Patsikatheodorou	16	Chandra Bamunusinghe	2015–2016
(5)	Drew Jessop	(10)	Ann Potter	2016−2017
(11)	Geoff Porter	17	Carly Moore	2017−2018
15	Carly Moore	18	Naim Kurt	2018−2019
(15)	Carly Moore	19	Karen Sherry	2019−2020 (Note: "Hume City Council Statutory Meeting 2019" (PDF). A motion was approved to have two Deputy Mayors for the 2019/20 year under the 1989 Local Government Act. Cr Sherry, Cr Haweil, and Cr Medcraft contested. Cr Sherry was elected first Deputy Mayor with 7 votes. Cr Medcraft defeated Cr Haweil 8-2 for the second Deputy Mayoral position.)
(15)	Carly Moore	20	Jack Medcraft	2019−2020
16	Joseph Haweil	(20)	Jack Medcraft	2020−2021
(15)	Carly Moore	21	Sam Misho	2021−2022
(16)	Joseph Haweil	(19)	Karen Sherry	2022−2023
17	Naim Kurt	(19)	Karen Sherry	2023−2024
18	Jarrod Bell	(18)	Naim Kurt	2024−2025
(15)	Carly Moore	22	Ally Watson	2025−2026
(15)	Carly Moore	(21)	Sam Misho	2026−

=== Current composition and election method ===
Between 2012 and 2024, Hume was divided into three wards – Aitken, Jacksons Creek and Meadow Valley – which elected a total of 11 Councillors:

- Aitken Ward (4 Councillors)
- Jacksons Creek Ward (3 Councillors)
- Meadow Valley Ward (4 Councillors)

Council elections are counted using single transferable vote. Voting is compulsory for residents who are on the voters' roll for local council elections, but voters aged 70 years or over are not obliged to vote at local council elections. The Mayor is a serving councillor, chosen annually by councillors. Council elections occur every four years, and were most recently held in October 2020 and October 2024.

=== 2020–2024 ===
Ward	Councillor	Notes
Aitken	Carly Moore	
Aitken	Jodi Jackson	
Aitken	Joseph Haweil	
Aitken	Jim Overend	
Jacksons Creek	Jack Medcraft	
Jacksons Creek	Jarrod Bell	
Jacksons Creek	Trevor Dance	
Meadow Valley	Chris Hollow	
Meadow Valley	Karen Sherry	Deputy Mayor
Meadow Valley	Naim Kurt	Mayor
Meadow Valley	Sam Misho	

=== 2024-2028 ===
Ward	Named after	Party	Councillor	Notes
Aitken	John Aitken, first European settler in the district	Independent	Carly Moore	
Bababi Marning	Bababi Marning (Cooper Street) Grassland Reserve, Epping (in turn named for the Woiwurrung word for "mother's hand")	Independent Labor	John Haddad	
Burt-kur-min	Burt-kur-min Reserve, Craigieburn	Independent Liberal	Jim Overend	
Emu Creek	Emu Creek	Independent	Kate Hamley	
Jacksons Hill	Jacksons Hill, Sunbury	Independent Labor	Jarrod Bell	Mayor
Merlynston Creek	Merlynston Creek	Independent Labor	Karen Sherry	
Mount Ridley	Mount Ridley, Craigieburn	Independent	Daniel English	
Roxburgh Park	The locality of Roxburgh Park	Independent Liberal	Sam Misho	
Tullamarine	The locality of Tullamarine	Independent Labor	Naim Kurt	Deputy Mayor
Woodlands	Woodlands Historic Park, Greenvale	Independent Labor	Steve Gagen	
Yubup	Yubup Primary School, Mickleham (in turn named for the Woiwurrung word for "parakeet")	Independent	Ally Watson	

== Townships and localities ==
The 2021 census, the city had a population of 243,901 up from 197,376 in the 2016 census

Population
Locality	2016	2021
Attwood	3,419	3,309
Broadmeadows	11,970	12,524
Bulla	675	668
Campbellfield	5,056	4,977
Clarkefield^	320	303
Coolaroo	3,191	3,193
Craigieburn	50,347	65,178
Dallas	6,810	6,762
Diggers Rest^	2,763	5,669
Fawkner^	14,043	14,274
Gladstone Park	8,338	8,213
Greenvale	15,466	21,274
Jacana	2,128	2,187
Kalkallo	105	5,548
Keilor^	5,853	5,906
Meadow Heights	14,842	14,890
Melbourne Airport	104	64
Mickleham	3,142	17,452
Oaklands Junction	433	439
Roxburgh Park	21,817	24,129
Somerton	0	6
Sunbury	36,084	38,851
Tullamarine^	6,605	6,733
Westmeadows	5,848	6,502
Wildwood	216	244
Yuroke	142	123

^ - Territory divided with another LGA

== See also ==
- List of places on the Victorian Heritage Register in the City of Hume
