= Roxburgh Park =

- Suburb
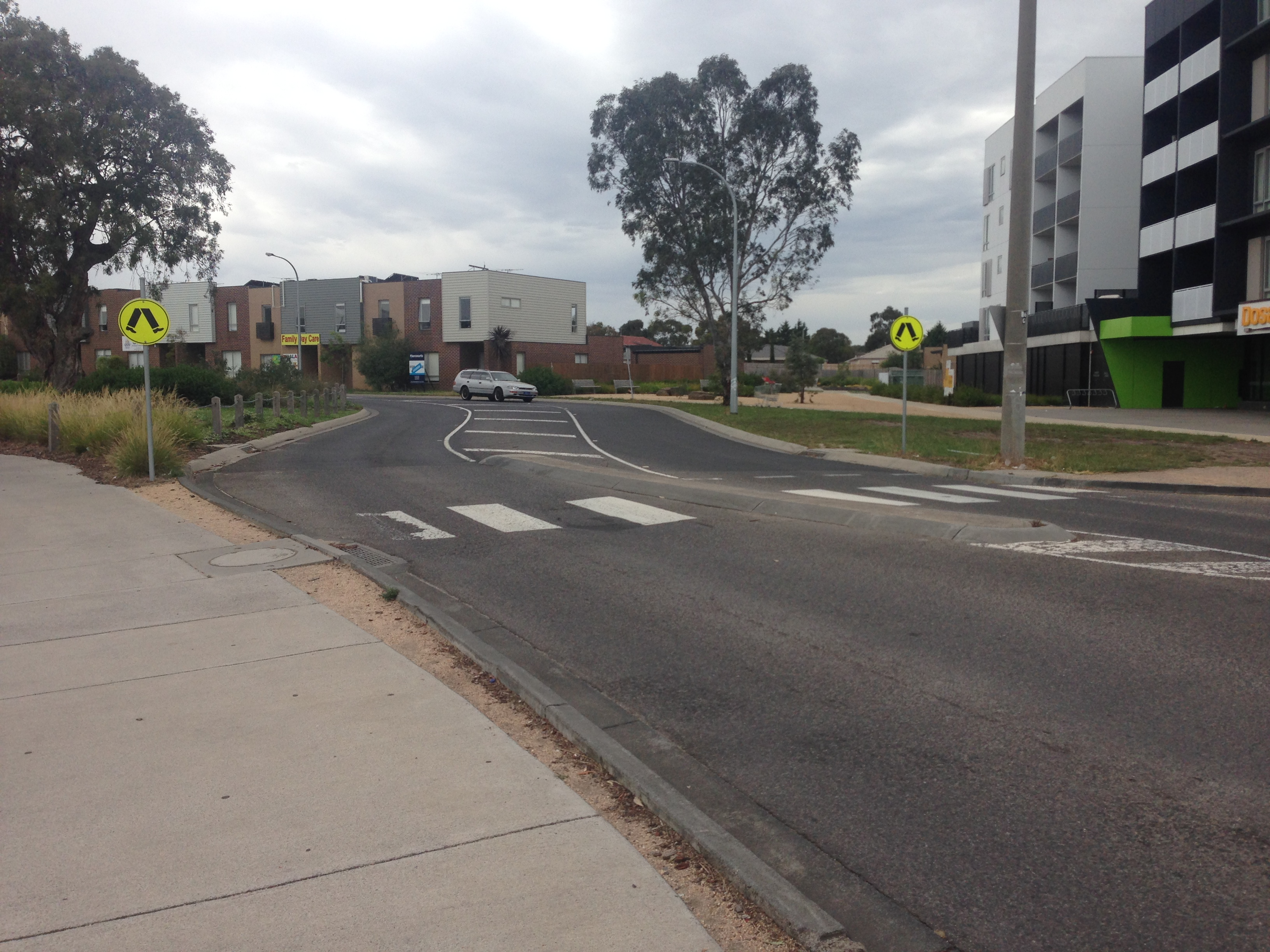
- Thomas Brunton Parade, Roxburgh Park

- Interactive map of Roxburgh Park
- Coordinates: 37.627°S 144.929°E
- Country: Australia
- State: Victoria
- City: Melbourne
- LGA: City of Hume
- Location: 21 km (13 mi) N of Melbourne
- Established: 1992

Government
  - State electorate: Greenvale
  - Federal division: Calwell

Area
  - Total: 5.1 km^{2} (2.0 sq mi)
- Elevation: 184 m (604 ft)

Population
  - Total: 24,129 (2021 census)
  - Density: 4,730/km^{2} (12,250/sq mi)
- Postcode: 3064
Suburbs around Roxburgh Park
Craigieburn	Craigieburn	Craigieburn
Greenvale	Roxburgh Park	Somerton
Greenvale	Meadow Heights	Coolaroo

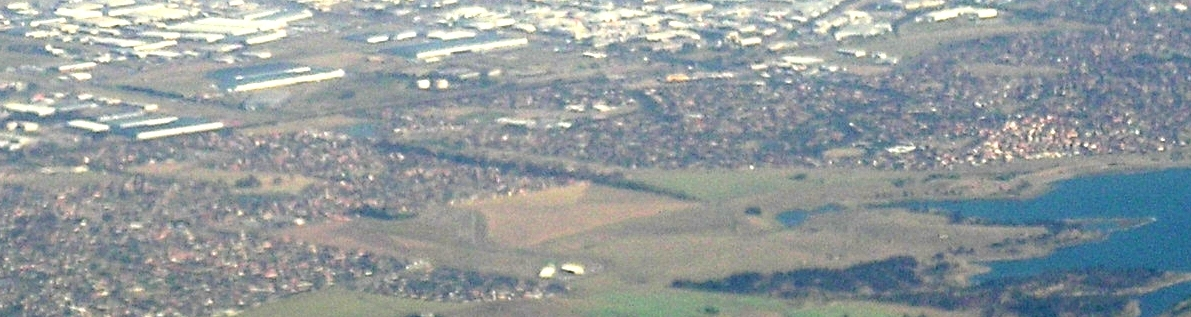
Aerial view of Roxburgh Park from north west

Roxburgh Park (/rɒksb(ə)rə/ rocks-bə-RƏ, also /rɒksbɜːrɡ/ rocks-BURG) is a suburb in Melbourne, Victoria, Australia, 21 km (13 mi) north of the central business district, located within the City of Hume local government area. Roxburgh Park recorded a population of 24,129 at the 2021 census.

The suburb is bound by Craigieburn to the north, to the west by Aitken Boulevard skirting the Greenvale Reservoir, to the east by the Craigieburn railway line and to the south by Somerton Road.

== History ==
Originally part of Somerton, Roxburgh Park gets its name from the property "Roxburgh", which was named by local farmer Thomas Brunton in about 1885, after his house in Scotland. Prior to the construction of Roxburgh Park, the area was the subject of a design by architect Philip Treeby for a garden suburb called "Hopetoun" in 1889. Plans for the suburb included parks, schools, tennis courts and shops. The early 1890s economic depression prevented the construction of this design.

In January 1951, the Moonee Valley Racing Club bought the 832 acres (337 ha) "Roxburgh Park" property for £35,000, as a speculative investment, although the purchase did give the club an option if it ever had to leave its somewhat cramped location in Moonee Ponds.

The Victorian Government's Urban and Regional Land Corporation (later "VicUrban" and then "Places Victoria") purchased land in the area in 1988 to plan and develop Roxburgh Park (not unlike the new towns in the green wedges of Britain). The suburb, which was originally going to be named "Ruthvenfield", was to comprise 7000 house blocks for around 20,000 residents. It was established as a master-planned community in 1992, and construction began in the early 1990s.

Recognition of Roxburgh Park was promoted in widely screened TV commercials throughout the mid-1990s, presenting Roxburgh Park's avowed virtues as a planned community with a balance of residential and industrial land, along with public reserves (part of the Shankland Reserve is in the south of Roxburgh Park), community services and access to transport. The slogan for the campaign was "Roxburgh Park – where dreams come true..."

Developments over recent years include child care centres, a retirement village and an Islamic centre. The commercial hub of the suburb is on Somerton Road.

== Demographics ==
The most common ancestries of residents in Roxburgh Park are Turkish 11.8%, Australian 11.5%, Iraqi 10.5%, Chaldean (Assyrian) 8.5%, English 7.8%.

Roxburgh Park has been described as one of Melbourne's "multicultural hot spots". Well-known figures in the immigrant community of the suburb include Alaa Elzokm, who was awarded an Order of Australia in the 2023 King's Birthday Honours, "For service to the Islamic community".

== Education ==
- Roxburgh Park Primary School
- Roxburgh Rise Primary School
- Roxburgh Homestead Primary School
- Good Samaritan Catholic Primary School
- Roxburgh College

== Commercial ==
Three large shopping centres are located within the suburb; on Somerton Road is the Roxburgh Park Shopping Centre, which features 70 specialist stores, on Pascoe Vale Road near the Roxburgh Park Hotel is the Roxburgh Plaza and Homemaker Centre. The smaller Roxburgh Homestead Shopping Centre lies close to the Roxburgh Homestead Primary School. On Fouz Street, near the Good Samaritan Catholic Primary School and along Donald Cameron Drive, is Roxy Central. Roxy Central was finalised and fully opened during 2021. It contains national brands such as FoodWorks and many different local small businesses.

== Sport ==
Roxburgh Park Football Club, an Australian Rules football team, competes in the Essendon District Football League.

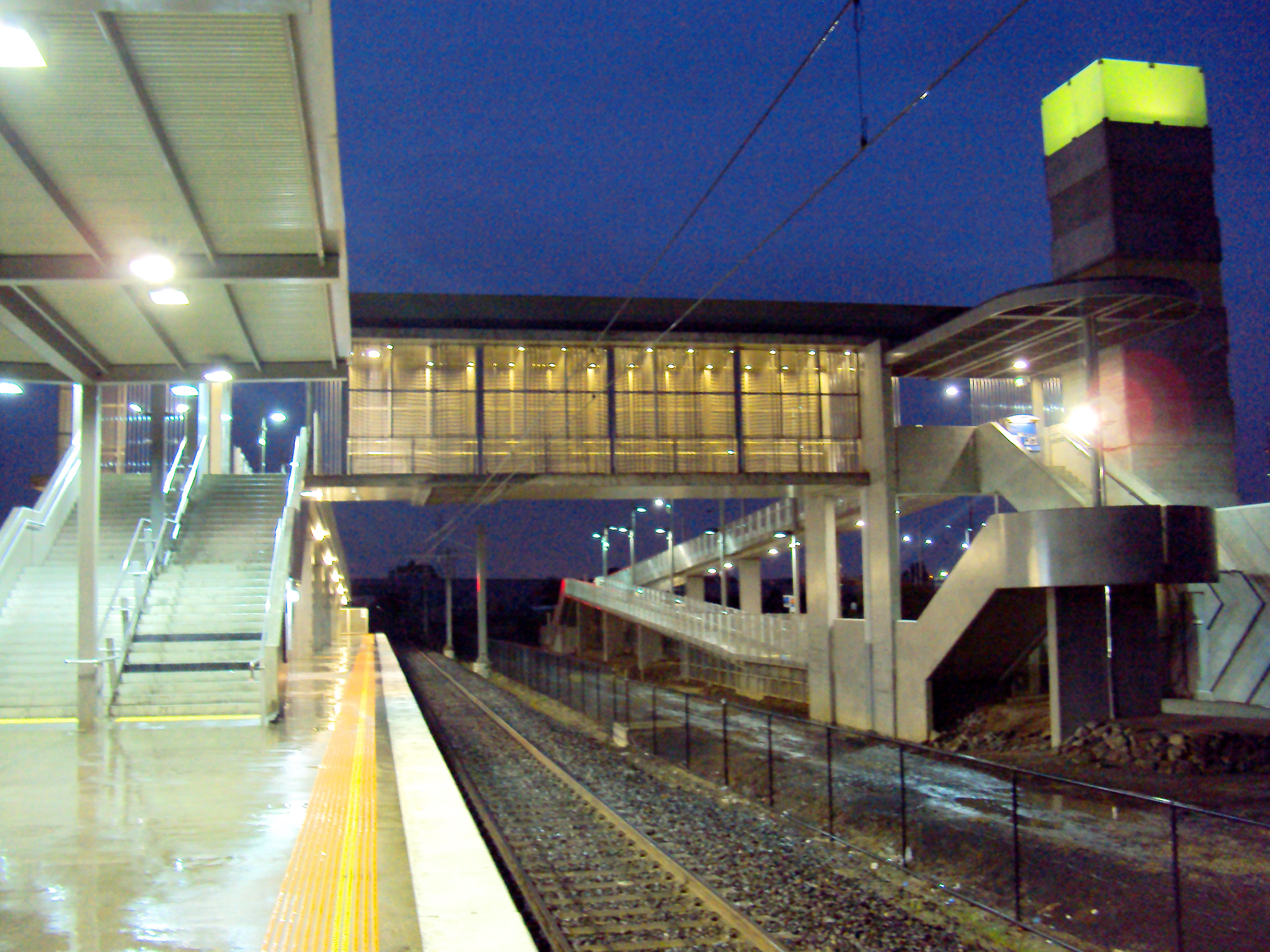
Roxburgh Park railway station

== Transport ==
=== Bus ===
Seven bus routes service Roxburgh Park:

- 484 : Broadmeadows station – Roxburgh Park station via Greenvale, operated by CDC Melbourne.
- 541 : Broadmeadows station – Craigieburn North, operated by Dysons
- 542 : Roxburgh Park station – Pascoe Vale station via Meadow Heights, Broadmeadows and Glenroy, operated by Dysons
- 543 : Greenvale Gardens – Roxburgh Park station via Greenvale Village Shopping Centre, operated by CDC Melbourne
- 544 : Craigieburn station – Roxburgh Park station, operated by CDC Melbiourne
- SmartBus 901 : Frankston station – Melbourne Airport, operated by Kinetic Melbourne
- Night Bus 953 : Broadmeadows station – Craigieburn via Roxburgh Park (operates Saturday and Sunday mornings only), operated by Ventura Bus Lines

=== Cycling ===
The Broadmeadows Valley Trail makes its way through the suburb, in a north–south direction.

=== Train ===
Roxburgh Park is served by Roxburgh Park station, on the Craigieburn line. The station opened on 30 September 2007, when electrification was extended from Broadmeadows to Craigieburn. The current station is approximately at the site of the former Somerton railway station, which opened in 1881 and closed in 1960.

== See also ==
- Shire of Bulla – Roxburgh Park was previously within this former local government area.
