= Mickleham, Victoria =

Mickleham
- Suburb
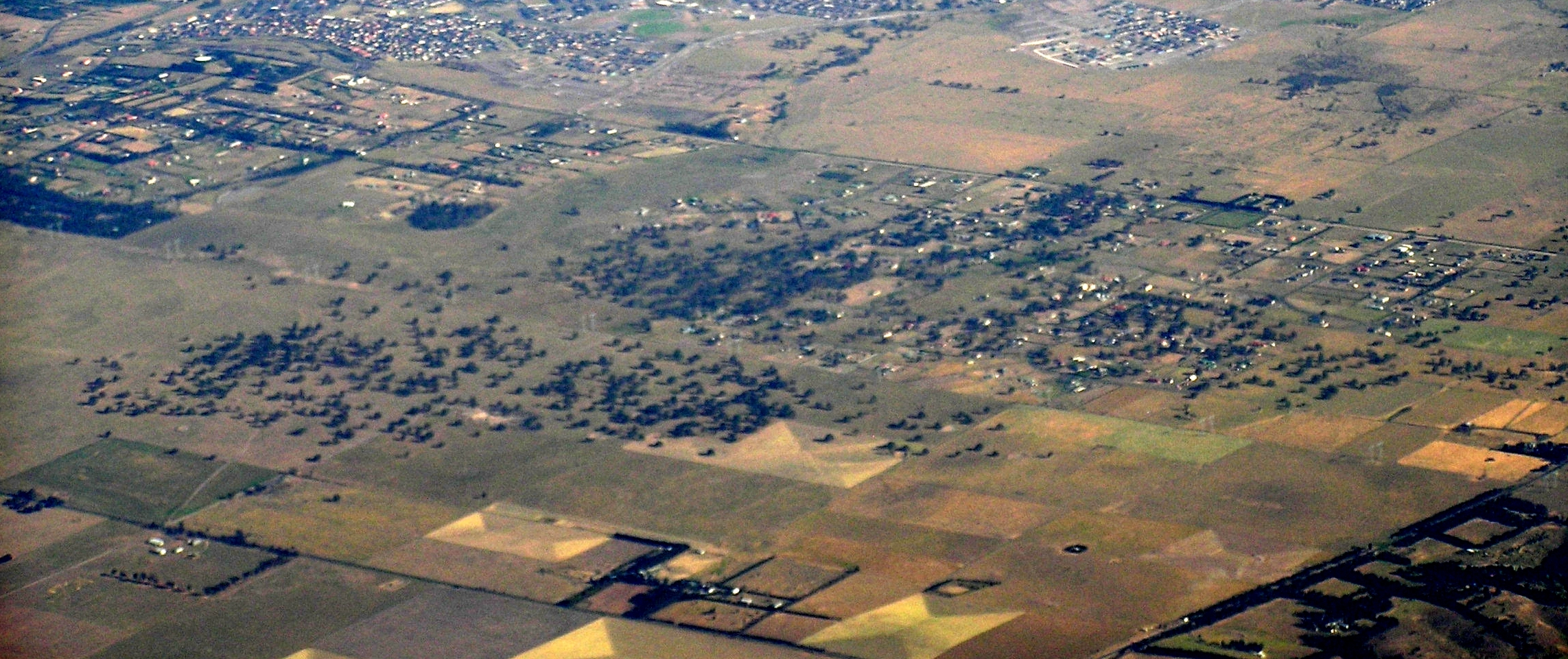
- Mickleham from the northwest

- Interactive map of Mickleham
- Coordinates: 37.562°S 144.874°E
- Country: Australia
- State: Victoria
- City: Melbourne
- LGA: City of Hume
- Location: 29 km (18 mi) from Melbourne

Government
  - State electorate: Kalkallo
  - Federal division: Calwell
- Elevation: 243 m (797 ft)

Population
  - Total: 17,452 (2021 census)
- Postcode: 3064
Suburbs around Mickleham
Clarkefield	Beveridge	Kalkallo
Yuroke	Mickleham	Craigieburn
Wildwood	Craigieburn	Craigieburn

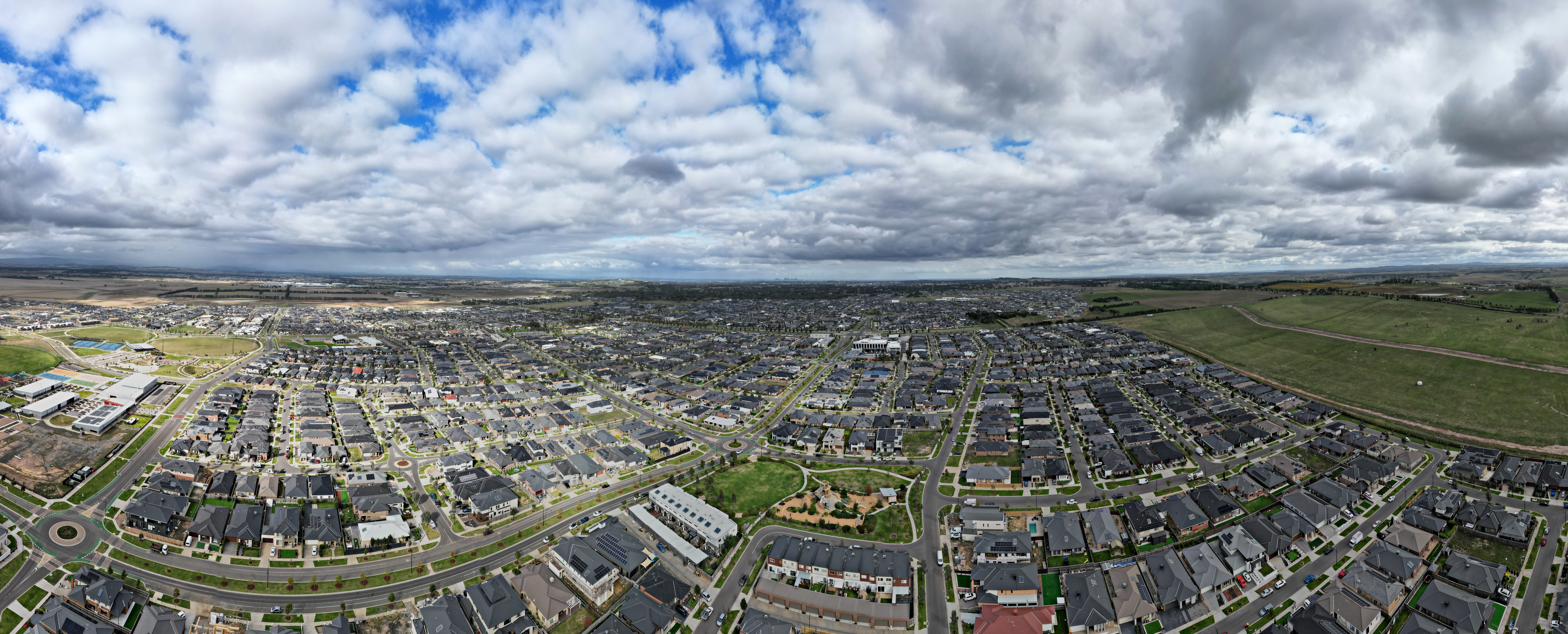
Mickleham panorama facing south towards the Melbourne skyline. April 2024.

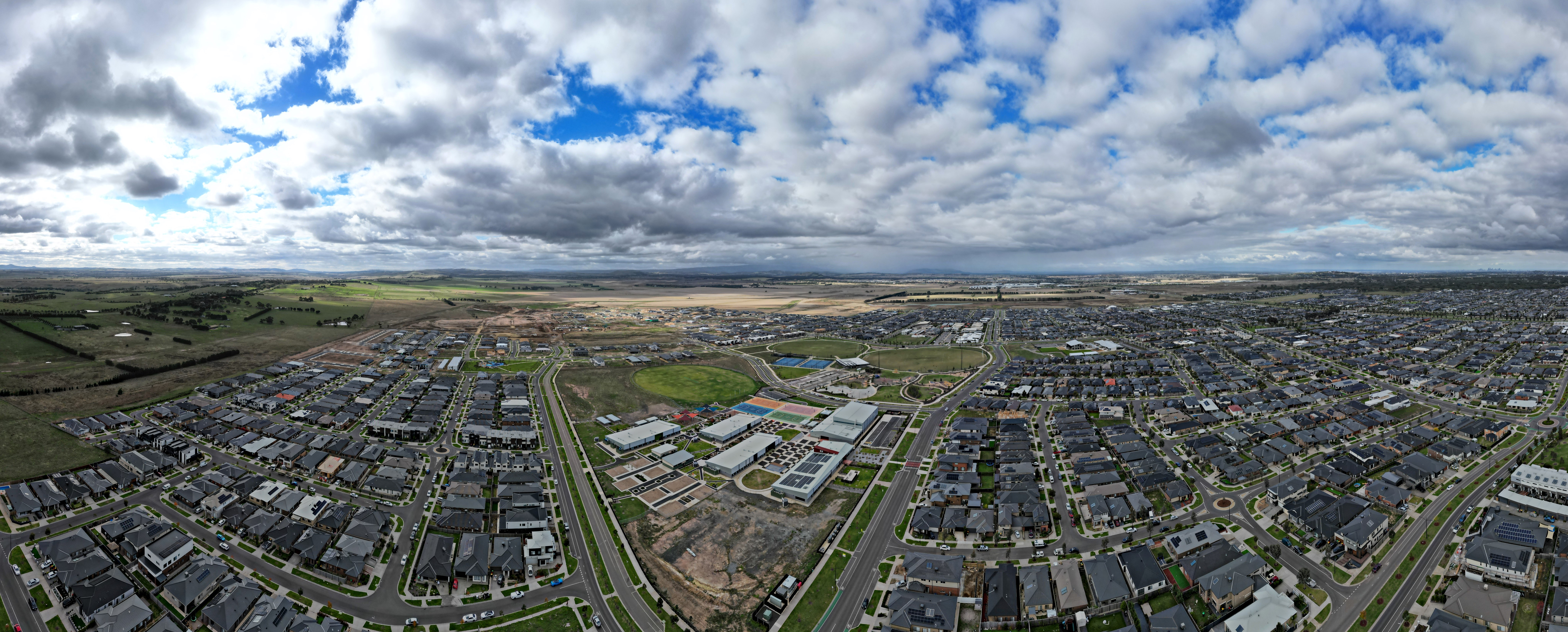
Mickleham panorama facing eastwards to the Dandenong Ranges. April 2024.

Mickleham is a suburb of Melbourne, Victoria, Australia, 29 km (18 mi) north of Melbourne's central business district, located within the City of Hume local government area and beyond the Urban Growth Boundary. Mickleham recorded a population of 17,452 at the 2021 census, compared to 3,142 at the 2016 census. In 2018, it was covered by the Australian Broadcasting Corporation as Australia's fastest-growing suburb.

The number of dwellings in Mickleham is forecast to grow from 5675 in 2021 to 9386 in 2026 with an estimated population of 30,091.

Mickleham is located north of Yuroke, on Mickleham Road.

== History ==
Mickleham Post Office opened on 1 February 1862 and closed in 1967. To the west of the locality a Konagaderra office opened in 1913 as settlement took place along Deep Creek but closed in 1920. This area is now known as Konagaderra Springs.

== Today ==
Currently there are several estates under development in Mickleham. These developments include housing, schools, child care, city centre and a business park on Donnybrook Road between Mickleham Road and Hume Freeway.

The suburb hosts Mickleham Post Entry Quarantine Facility, the quarantine facility for all animals and plants entering the country, which must be placed in quarantine according to Australian quarantine regulations. The quarantine facility is located on Donnybrook Road, close to the Hume Freeway.

The suburb also hosts the Melbourne Centre for National Resilience Melbourne, an infectious disease quarantine facility constructed during the COVID-19 pandemic. From its opening in February until October 2022, it was used to quarantine a total of 2168 people.

== Education ==
Mickleham has three government primary schools - Mickleham Primary School, Gaayip-Yagila Primary School, and Yubup Primary School - and one government secondary school, Mickleham Secondary College.

Mickleham also has three non-government schools - Holy Cross Primary School, a Catholic primary school, Hume Anglican Grammar, a P-12 grammar school, and Darul Ulum Academy, an Islamic school.

== Gallery ==
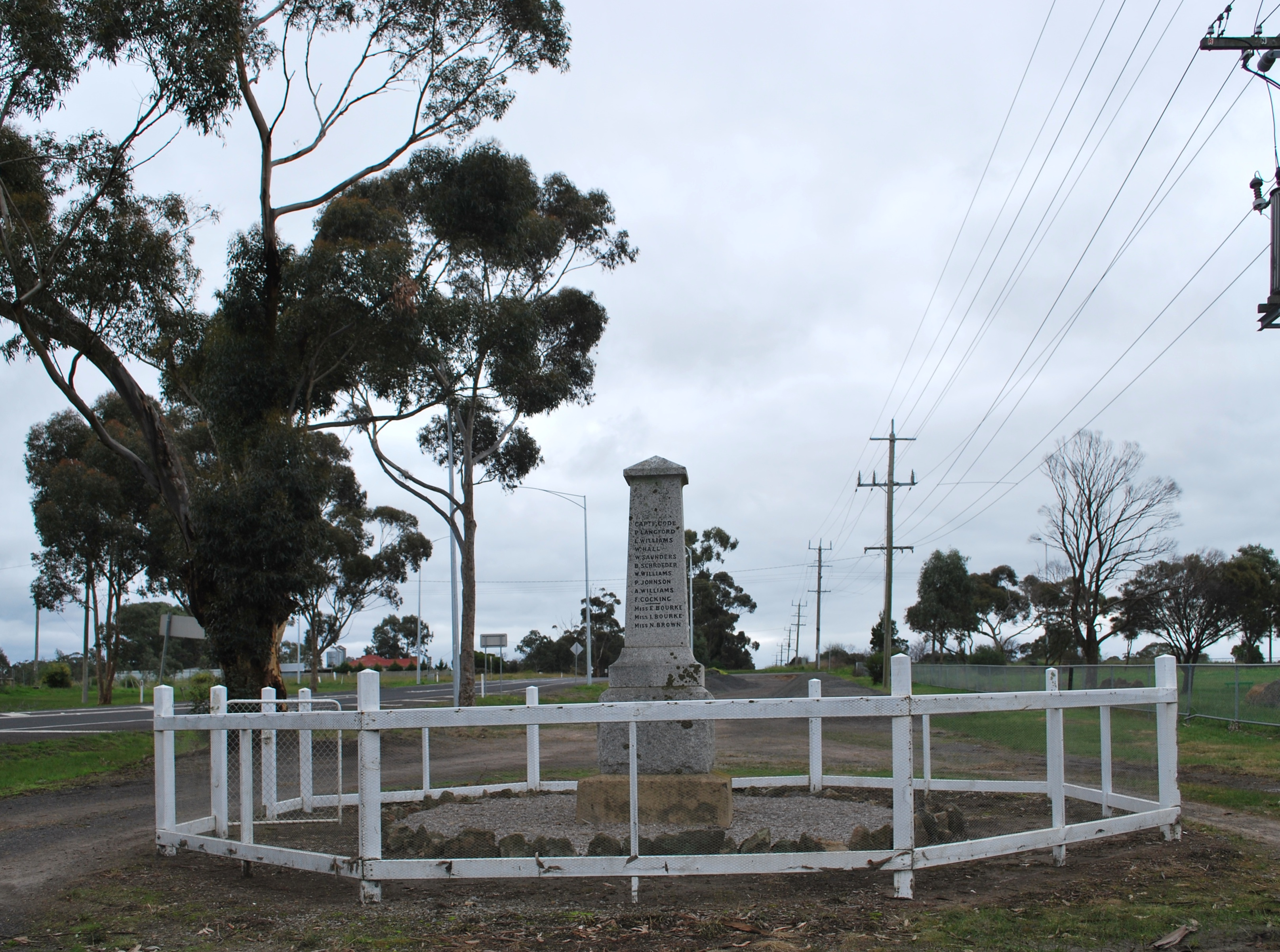
War memorial.

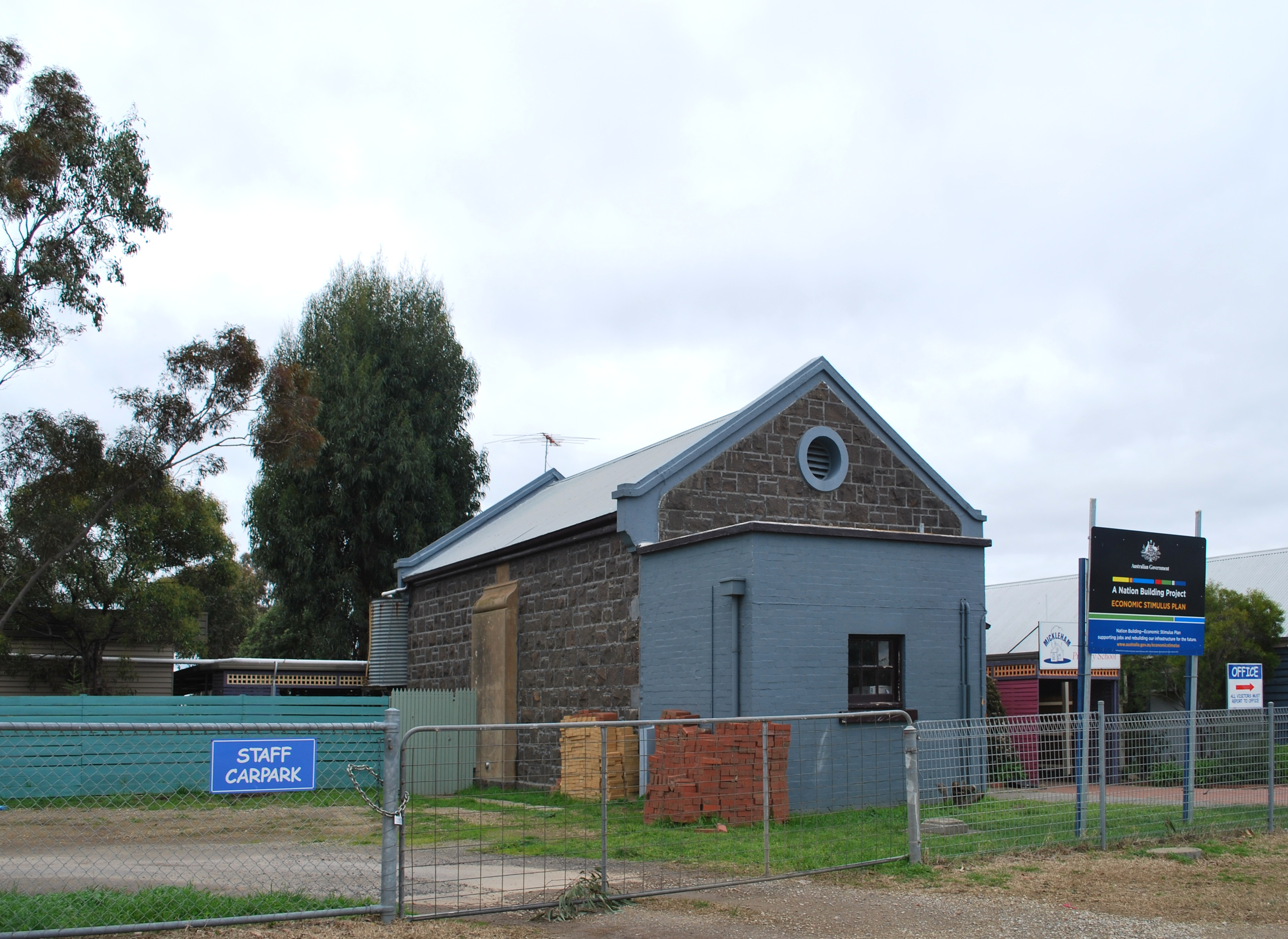
Bluestone building at Mickleham Primary School.

== See also ==
- Shire of Bulla – Mickleham was previously within this former local government area.
