= 2019 Campbellfield factory fire =

Major industrial fire in Melbourne, Victoria, Australia

- Date: 5 April 2019
- Time: 06:40 AEST
- Location: Campbellfield, Victoria, Australia; 37.645925°S 144.9410784°E
- Cause: Unknown
- Deaths: 0
- Injuries: 2 (both serious)

The 2019 Campbellfield factory fire was a major industrial fire that began in Campbellfield, a suburb of Melbourne, Victoria, Australia, on 5 April 2019. The size of the fire site was about 5,000 square metres (53,819.55 sq ft), and it emitted toxic smoke across the city's northern suburbs. The fire was finally extinguished four days after it started.

The company which operated the property where the fire took place, Bradbury Industrial Services, collapsed in July 2019, leaving taxpayers to potentially foot a multimillion-dollar clean-up bill. On 1 August 2019, the administrators for the company were given three months to clean up the site.

== Background ==
The fire occurred at a waste management factory owned by Bradbury Industrial Services on Thornycroft St at 6:40 am. Buildings and vehicles were turned into fireballs and chemical drums sent soaring high above the warehouse as the inferno raged for hours. A witness in a nearby suburb to the fire said he saw a "massive explosion that looked like a mushroom cloud". Two other fires had broken out in the facility previously.

Bradbury Industrial Services provides storage and disposal services for hazardous and industrial waste, and specialises in treating solvent and other waste from paint and related industries.

== Fire ==
Metropolitan Fire Brigade firefighters brought the blaze under control by midday on 5 April; however, the fire was not fully extinguished until four days later. About thirty people were believed to have escaped the building before the firefighters arrived. At least two factory workers were hospitalised as a result of severe burns from the fire, with one employee receiving an eye injury.

The fire was initially contained within four hours by 175 firefighters. Fire crews remain at the scene, using heat-detection devices to continually identify and dampen-down hotspots. The fire forced the closure of nearby schools and businesses. Some residents fled their homes to escape toxic fumes.

A number of schools and kindergartens in proximity to the fire were closed as of 7 April including:

- Dallas Brooks Community Primary School in Dallas
- Coolaroo South Primary School in Coolaroo
- Broadmeadows Primary School in Broadmeadows
- Hume Central Secondary College in Broadmeadows
- Meadows Primary School in Broadmeadows
- Hume Valley School in Dallas
- St Thomas More Primary School in Hadfield
- Ilim College in Broadmeadows
- Holy Child Primary School in Dallas
- St Dominic's Primary School in Broadmeadows
- Corpus Christi School in Glenroy

== Investigations ==
Investigations into the cause of the fire were started on 9 April, involving police, fire investigators from the Melbourne Metropolitan Fire Brigade, WorkSafe Victoria, and the Victorian Coroner. Initial speculations focused on the illegal or improper storage of flammable chemical waste.

The fire began less than one day after Victorian Environment Protection Authority authorities inspected the factory, and fifteen days after the factory had its license revoked for storing three times as much waste as it was permitted. EPA's inspection on 4 April discovered 300,000 litres of chemicals inside.

EPA executive director Damian Wells said the factory contained "highly flammable materials".

EPA has begun an independent review into its systems and processes for dealing with toxic waste.

== Legal pursuit ==
On 23 June 2023, the court hearing occurred at the County Court of Victoria. Bradbury Industrial Services received a fine of $2.9 million. Due to the company being in liquidation, the fine won't be paid.
