= Merlynston Creek =

Coordinates: 37°43′46″S 144°58′00″E

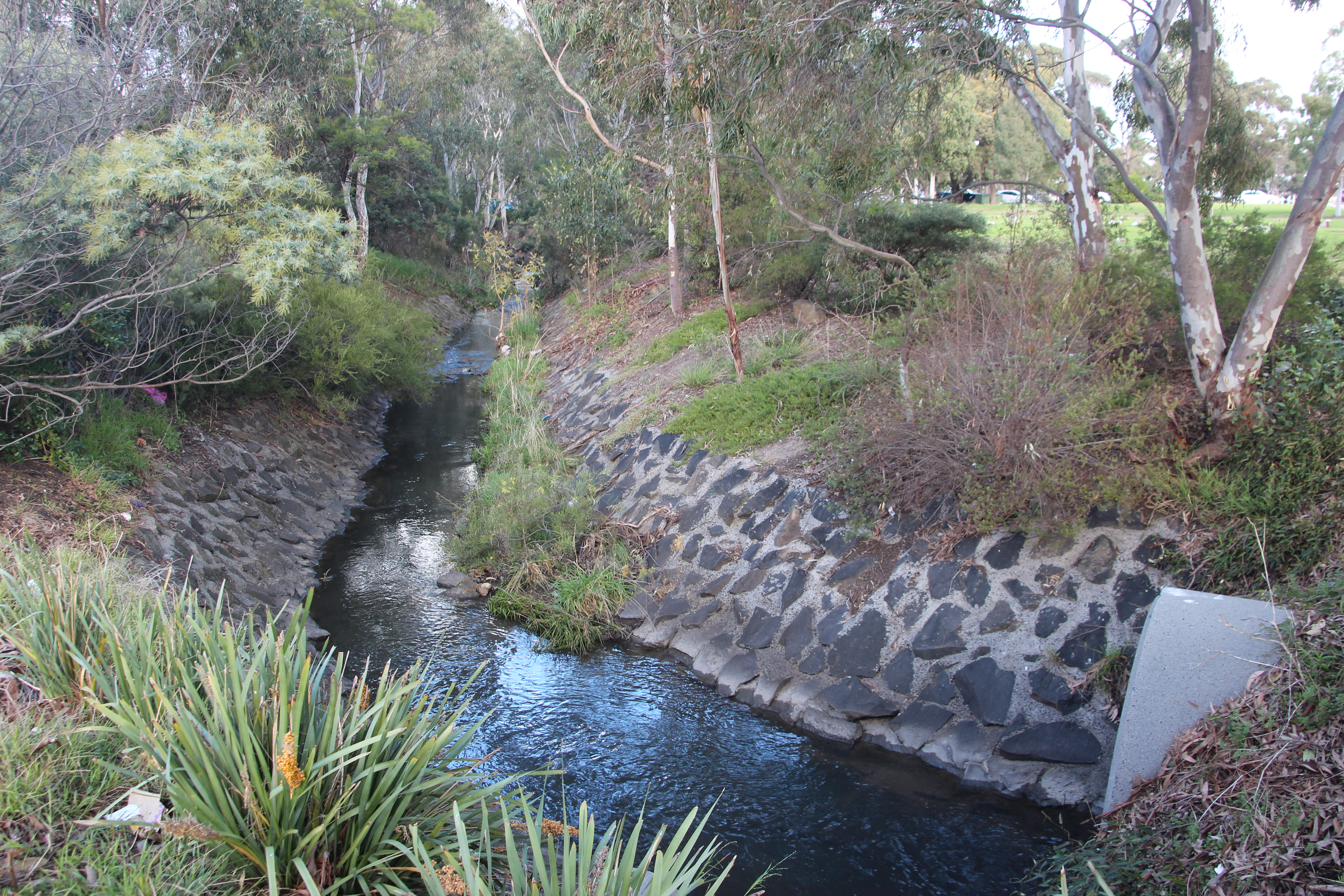
- Merlynston Creek in May 2017

Location
- Country: Australia
- State: Victoria

Physical characteristics
- Length: 11 km (6.8 mi)
- Basin size: Unknown

Merlynston Creek is a tributary of Merri Creek in Melbourne's northern suburbs, in Victoria, Australia.

The creek originates in an industrial area in the National Boulevard Reserve, north of Upfield railway station in the north of Campbellfield in the City of Hume.

The creek travels about 11 kilometres from Campbellfield, through the suburbs of Coolaroo, Dallas, Broadmeadows, Glenroy, Hadfield, Fawkner, and Coburg North to its confluence with the Merri Creek above Coburg Lake. Campbellfield Creek joins Merlynston Creek as it passes through Fawkner Cemetery.

The creek passes through Jack Roper Reserve, a picturesque lake and Melbourne Water flood mitigation retention basin, and one of City of Hume's most popular family parks. The retarding basin was constructed in 1964 to create the lake with a storage volume of 382 million litres. The operating range of the retarding basin (height to the spillway) is 10 metres.

Jack Roper Reserve is one of three flood mitigation basins in the creek's urban catchment. The other two are flood Detention basins: Army Basin, named after the nearby Maygar Barracks, and Box Forest mitigation basin located between the Northern Memorial Park and Box Forest Road.

According to the City of Merri-bek stormwater management plan, Merlynston Creek length is 43 percent piped or an open concrete channel, 27 percent has major modifications, and only 30 percent of the stream is relatively unmodified.

The creek passes through and is a major feature of the Northern Memorial Park and Fawkner Crematorium and Memorial Park, both run by the Greater Metropolitan Cemeteries Trust.

The creek has been diverted into underground pipes slightly north of Boundary Road as it leaves the cemetery, making its way southeast towards Merri Creek underneath the Merlynston locality and Coburg North. Increased urban consolidation has added to 100-year flash flooding risk along the course of Merlynston Creek, according to the State Emergency Service(SES). The State Emergency Services says flooding has occurred along the creek path through North Coburg historically in 1891, 1916, 1934, 1954, 1974, 1978, 1981, 1983, 1989, 2003, and 2011.
