= Meadow Heights, Victoria =

Meadow Heights
- Suburb
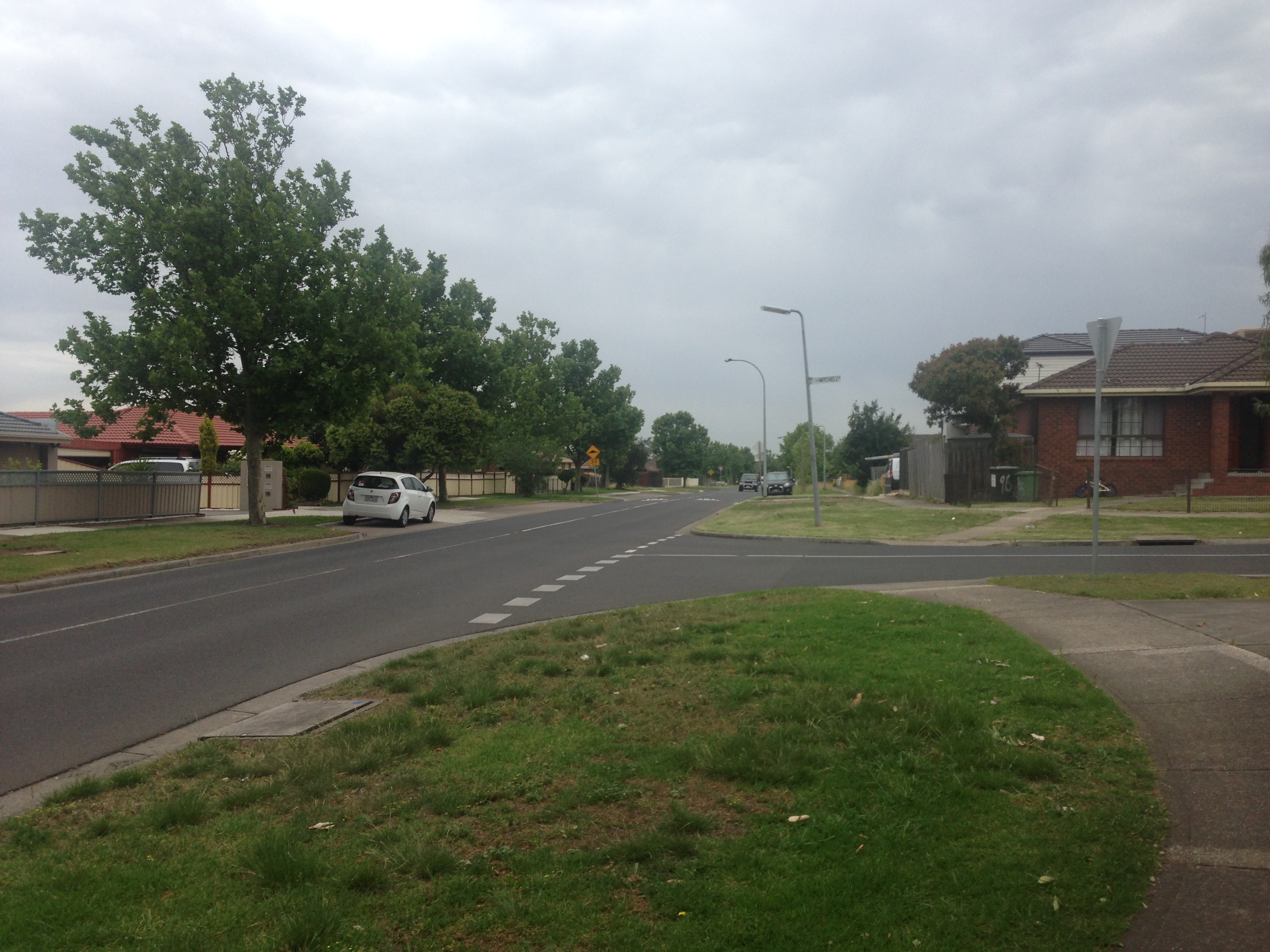
- Paringa Boulevard, Meadow Heights

- Interactive map of Meadow Heights
- Coordinates: 37.650°S 144.922°E
- Country: Australia
- State: Victoria
- City: Melbourne
- LGA: City of Hume
- Location: 18 km (11 mi) N of Melbourne
- Established: 1980s

Government
  - State electorate: Greenvale
  - Federal division: Calwell

Area
  - Total: 4.6 km^{2} (1.8 sq mi)

Population
  - Total: 14,890 (2021 census)
  - Density: 3,240/km^{2} (8,380/sq mi)
- Postcode: 3048
Suburbs around Meadow Heights
Greenvale	Roxburgh Park	Roxburgh Park
Greenvale	Meadow Heights	Coolaroo
Attwood	Westmeadows	Coolaroo

Meadow Heights is a suburb in Melbourne, Victoria, Australia, 18 km (11 mi) north of Melbourne's Central Business District, located within the City of Hume local government area. Meadow Heights recorded a population of 14,890 at the 2021 census.

Meadow Heights is bounded by Somerton Road in the north, Pascoe Vale Road in the east, Barry Road in the south and the Broadmeadows Valley Park in the west.

== History ==
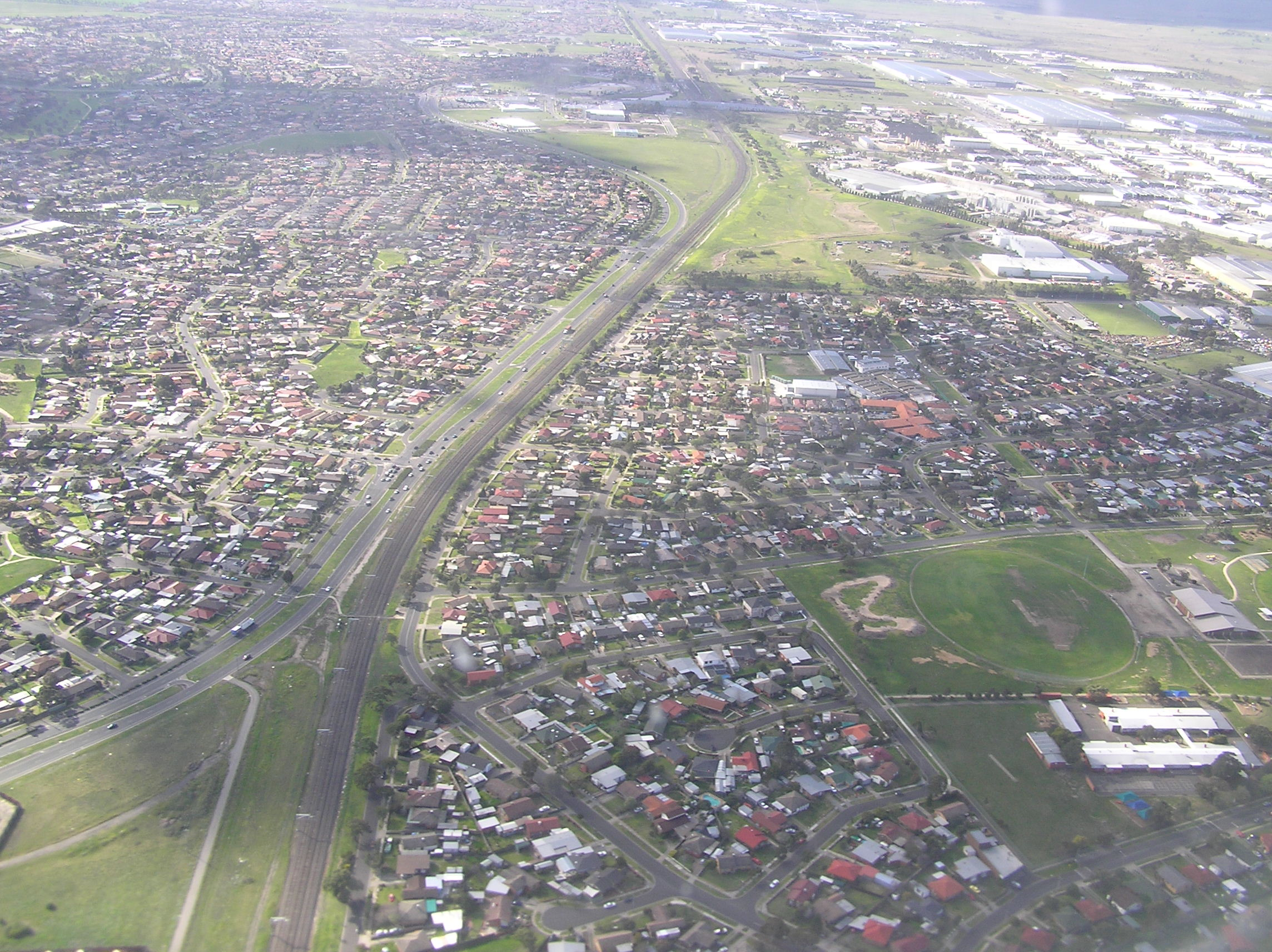
Aerial view Meadow Heights, Victoria

Until gazetted as a suburb in late 1994, Meadow Heights was a housing estate planned within Coolaroo.

When still open country, Meadow Heights was known as Broadmeadows North. The land was acquired by the Housing Commission for one of its several estates in the Broadmeadows region. Coolaroo, immediately east of Meadow Heights was built by the Commission during 1966-72. In 1975 the Commission started building at Meadow Heights, although at that time the new estate was named Westmeadows Heights. (See separate entry on Westmeadows for an explanation of the name.) In 1982 the new estate was also considered to be part of Coolaroo.

Westmeadows Heights primary school opened in 1977, and Bethal primary school opened two years later. Both came commendably early in the growth of new public housing estates. The Commission withdrew from house construction and left it to The Urban Land Authority (later "VicUrban" and then "Places Victoria") to complete the estate. it acquired 230 hectares from the Housing Commission for $3 million in 1986 and has created about 3000 blocks. Completion of the suburb took until the 1990s, with a post office not opening until 1995.

There is a shopping centre in the middle of Meadow Heights,Built by Deal Corporation And Opened In November 1993 with an Islamic mosque and cultural centre,(2007) a Catholic church and learning centre, and a community centre to the south. The Coolaroo railway station (2010) is immediately south-east of Meadow Heights.

Meadow Heights Post Office opened on 6 March 1995.

In recent years, developers have focused their efforts on suburbs to the north, with very few new housing projects being completed since 2000.

== Demographics ==
The most common ancestries in Meadow Heights were 21.8% Turkish, 12.2% Australian, 9.4% English, 9.0% Lebanese and 4.4% Iraqi. 46.3% of people were born in Australia. The most common countries of birth were 11.1% Turkey, 7.1% Iraq, 4.3% Lebanon, 3.0% Syria and 2.5% Vietnam.

23.5% of people only spoke English at home. Other languages spoken at home included 20.8% Turkish, 17.9% Arabic, 4.8% Assyrian Neo-Aramaic, 3.9% Vietnamese, and 3.2% Urdu.

The most common responses for religion in Meadow Heights were 48.1% Islam, 18.1% Catholic, 9.7% no religion and 2.4% Assyrian Apostolic.

== Education ==
Meadow Heights has two primary schools (Meadow Heights Primary School and Bethal Primary School) and several childcare centres.

== Places of interest ==
Meadow Heights offers several places of interest, with the nearest cinema complex located to the south, in Broadmeadows. There are several youth centres for social activities and there is a soccer team in the area.

There are around four milk bars; on Bicentennial Crescent and Magnolia Boulevard in the north, Taggerty Crescent in the centre, and one on Eldorado Crescent to the south.

The main shopping centre is the Meadow Heights Shopping Centre, which is located on Paringa Boulevard. It features a SUPA IGA Supermarket and over 25 specialty shops.

There is also a mosque in Meadow Heights, near the shopping centre.

A community centre and a skate bowl are located in the Buchan Street Reserve.

Meadow Heights has parks all throughout the suburb, the largest of which is the Broadmeadows Valley Park, which starts from Meadow Heights right down to Jacana, with a bike trail alongside. The park has soccer fields and playgrounds near Barry Road and Magnolia Boulevard, providing barbecue and picnic areas for residents. Shankland Wetlands has a variety of introduced and native birds. The wetlands is located south of Meadow Heights, at the end of Barry Road.

== Transport ==
=== Bus ===
Six bus routes service Meadow Heights.

The following bus routes run through Meadow Heights:

- 541 : Broadmeadows station – Craigieburn North via Meadow Heights. Operated by Dysons.
- 542 : Roxburgh Park station – Pascoe Vale station via Meadow Heights, Broadmeadows and Glenroy. Operated by Dysons.

The following bus routes travel along the boundaries of Meadow Heights:

- 484 : Broadmeadows station – Roxburgh Park station via Greenvale. Operated by CDC Melbourne.
- 543 : Greenvale Gardens – Roxburgh Park station via Greenvale Village Shopping Centre. Operated by CDC Melbourne.
- 901 : Frankston station – Melbourne Airport (SmartBus service). Operated by Kinetic Melbourne.
- 953 : Broadmeadows station – Craigieburn via Roxburgh Park (Night Bus service, operates Saturday and Sunday mornings only). Operated by Ventura Bus Lines.

=== Road ===
Meadow Heights is bordered by Pascoe Vale Road on the east, parkland on the west, Barry Road on the south and Somerton Road to the north.

The area is also served extensively by local taxi companies.

=== Train ===
Coolaroo and Roxburgh Park are the nearest railway stations to Meadow Heights. Both are located on the Craigieburn line.

== See also ==
- City of Broadmeadows – Meadow Heights was previously within this former local government area.
