= Division of Calwell =

Australian federal electoral division

Coordinates: 37.589°S 144.825°E

Calwell Australian House of Representatives Division
- Interactive map of electorate boundaries from the 2025 federal election
- Created: 1984
- MP: Basem Abdo
- Party: Labor
- Namesake: Arthur Calwell
- Electors: 115,552 (2025)
- Area: 191 km^{2} (73.7 sq mi)
- Demographic: Outer metropolitan
Electorates around Calwell:
McEwen	McEwen	McEwen
Hawke	Calwell	Scullin
Hawke	Maribyrnong	Wills

The Division of Calwell (/kɔːlwɛl/) is an Australian Electoral Division in the state of Victoria.

Calwell contains the outer north-western fringe of Melbourne. It is located entirely within the City of Hume, and includes the suburbs of Broadmeadows, Dallas, Coolaroo, Greenvale, Meadow Heights, Roxburgh Park, Craigieburn and Mickleham.

Calwell has been a safe Labor seat since it was created in 1984. Calwell has had only three members, Dr. Andrew Theophanous, from 1984 to 2001, former MP Maria Vamvakinou, from 2001 to 2025, and incumbent MP Basem Abdo. All three served as members of the Australian Labor Party.

== History ==
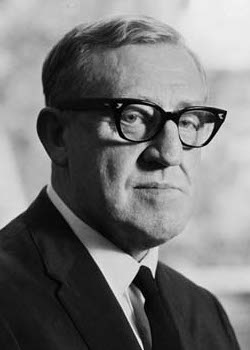
Arthur Calwell, the division's namesake

The division was created in 1984 and is named for Arthur Calwell, who was Minister for Immigration 1945–1949 and Leader of the Australian Labor Party 1960–1967.

Calwell has been a safe Labor seat since it was first contested. The seat's first MP elected in 1984 was Andrew Theophanous. After failing to retain Labor preselection due to issues of criminality, Theophanous unsuccessfully contested the 2001 election as an independent, polling 9.6% of the vote. In the 2001 federal election, Maria Vamvakinou was elected as a member of the Australian Labor Party. Calwell is currently Labor's second safest seat, with 68.80% on the 2PP.

At the 2011 Census, Calwell had the nation's most stable population, with only 25.6% of residents having moved in the last five years. The electorate had the nation's third highest proportion of Catholics (38.5%) and the third highest proportion of residents of Islamic faith (16.8%), the highest in Victoria.

In 2017, Calwell had the highest "no" vote for marriage equality in Victoria, with 56.8% of the electorate's respondents to the survey responding "No".

Calwell was the seat of a historically unique contest in the 2025 federal election, as a full preference count had to be undertaken to determine which candidate would join Labor in the two-candidate preferred vote. Of the 13 candidates that ran in Calwell (in itself the equal-biggest candidate list of any seat in the 2025 election), the Liberal Party, the Greens and three separate independents each received between 6% and 16% of the first-preference vote, making it difficult to project both preference flows and the order in which candidates would be eliminated. Due to the unprecedented nature of the count and public interest in the result, the Australian Electoral Commission gave live updates of the full preference count on their website, stating it was "the most complex preference count the AEC has ever conducted".

== Boundaries ==
Since 1984, federal electoral division boundaries in Australia have been determined at redistributions by a redistribution committee appointed by the Australian Electoral Commission. Redistributions occur for the boundaries of divisions in a particular state, and they occur every seven years, or sooner if a state's representation entitlement changes or when divisions of a state are malapportioned.

When the division was first created in 1984, it covered the western suburbs such as Sunshine West, St Albans, Avondale Heights, Keilor, Sydenham and Diggers Rest. In 1989, it lost the areas south of St Albans (inclusive), which were about half of its original area, but gained a massive area to the east towards City of Broadmeadows, such as Melbourne Airport, Greenvale, Broadmeadows and Campbellfield. This was the beginning of the division's gradual shift towards the north-east.

In 2003, the division was significantly shifted northwards and lost all of its areas within City of Brimbank (which was mostly south of the Maribyrnong River). Instead, it became co-extensive with the boundary of City of Hume, gaining areas such as Sunbury, Mickleham and Craigieburn from the divisions of Burke (abolished) and McEwen. The losses and gains were reversed in 2010, with the division returning into City of Brimbank and covered areas similar to its pre-2003 boundaries. In 2018, the City of Brimbank areas were lost again, and the division no longer included any of the areas that it covered in 1984. In 2021, the division lost its south-west portion of Melbourne Airport and Tullamarine. In 2024, it lost all of its areas east of Sydney Road and Hume Freeway, with Kalkallo lost to Division of McEwen and the remainder to Division of Scullin.

As of the 2024 redistribution, the division is located entirely within the City of Hume in the north-western suburbs of Melbourne. It is bordered by the City of Hume / Mitchell Shire boundary to the north, Sydney Road and Hume Freeway to the east, and Deep Creek to the west. It covers an area of approximately 191 square kilometres (74 sq mi) from Mickleham in the north to Broadmeadows in the south and from Oaklands Junction in the west to Somerton in the east. Localities include Attwood, Broadmeadows, Coolaroo, Craigieburn, Dallas, Greenvale, Jacana, Meadow Heights, Mickleham, Roxburgh Park, Upfield, Westmeadows and Yuroke; as well as part of Campbellfield, Fawkner, Oaklands Junction and Somerton.

== Demographics ==
Calwell is a diverse and socially conservative electorate. Calwell includes Victoria's largest Iraqi community along with Turkish and Lebanese diaspora. While a stronghold for the centre-left Labor Party, the religious migrant community rallied against same-sex marriage in 2017, with 17.7% of the electorate from an Islamic background, six times the state average, while 34% are Catholic, 12% higher than the rest of the state. At the 2021 census, 23.8% of Hume residents (Victorian average: 4.2%) reported their religion as Islam and 26.6% (Victorian average: 20.5%) as Catholic.

== Members ==
Image	Member	Party	Term	Notes
	Andrew Theophanous (1946–)	Labor	1 December 1984 – 18 April 2000	Previously held the Division of Burke. Lost seat
	Andrew Theophanous (1946–)	Independent	18 April 2000 – 10 November 2001	Previously held the Division of Burke. Lost seat
	Maria Vamvakinou (1959–)	Labor	10 November 2001 – 28 March 2025	Retired
	Basem Abdo (1987–)	Labor	3 May 2025 – present	Incumbent

== Election results ==
2025 Australian federal election: Calwell
Party	Candidate	Votes	%	±%
Labor	Basem Abdo	27,423	30.53	−14.33
Liberal	Usman Ghani	14,102	15.70	−8.01
Independent	Carly Moore	10,735	11.95	+11.95
Independent	Joseph Youhana	9,628	10.72	+10.72
Greens	Ravneet Kaur Garcha	7,439	8.28	−1.47
Independent	Samim Moslih	6,155	6.85	+6.85
One Nation	Luay Toma	3,375	3.76	−3.24
Legalise Cannabis	Gianni Del Rosario-Makridis	2,843	3.16	+3.16
Citizens	Bassima Hawli	2,624	2.92	+2.92
Family First	Maria Bengtsson	2,308	2.57	+2.57
Trumpet of Patriots	Assaad Issa	2,211	2.46	+0.68
Independent	Ravi Ragupathy	501	0.56	+0.56
	Morgan Peach	487	0.54	+0.54
Total formal votes		89,831	89.39	−4.32
Informal votes		10,657	10.61	+4.32
Turnout		100,488	86.97	+9.97
Notional two-party-preferred count
Labor	Basem Abdo	58,127	64.71	+2.32
Liberal	Usman Ghani	31,704	35.29	−2.32
Two-candidate-preferred result
Labor	Basem Abdo	49,481	55.08	−7.31
Independent	Carly Moore	40,350	44.92	+44.92
Labor hold				
