= Pascoe Vale Road =

Road in Melbourne, Victoria

Pascoe Vale Road Victoria
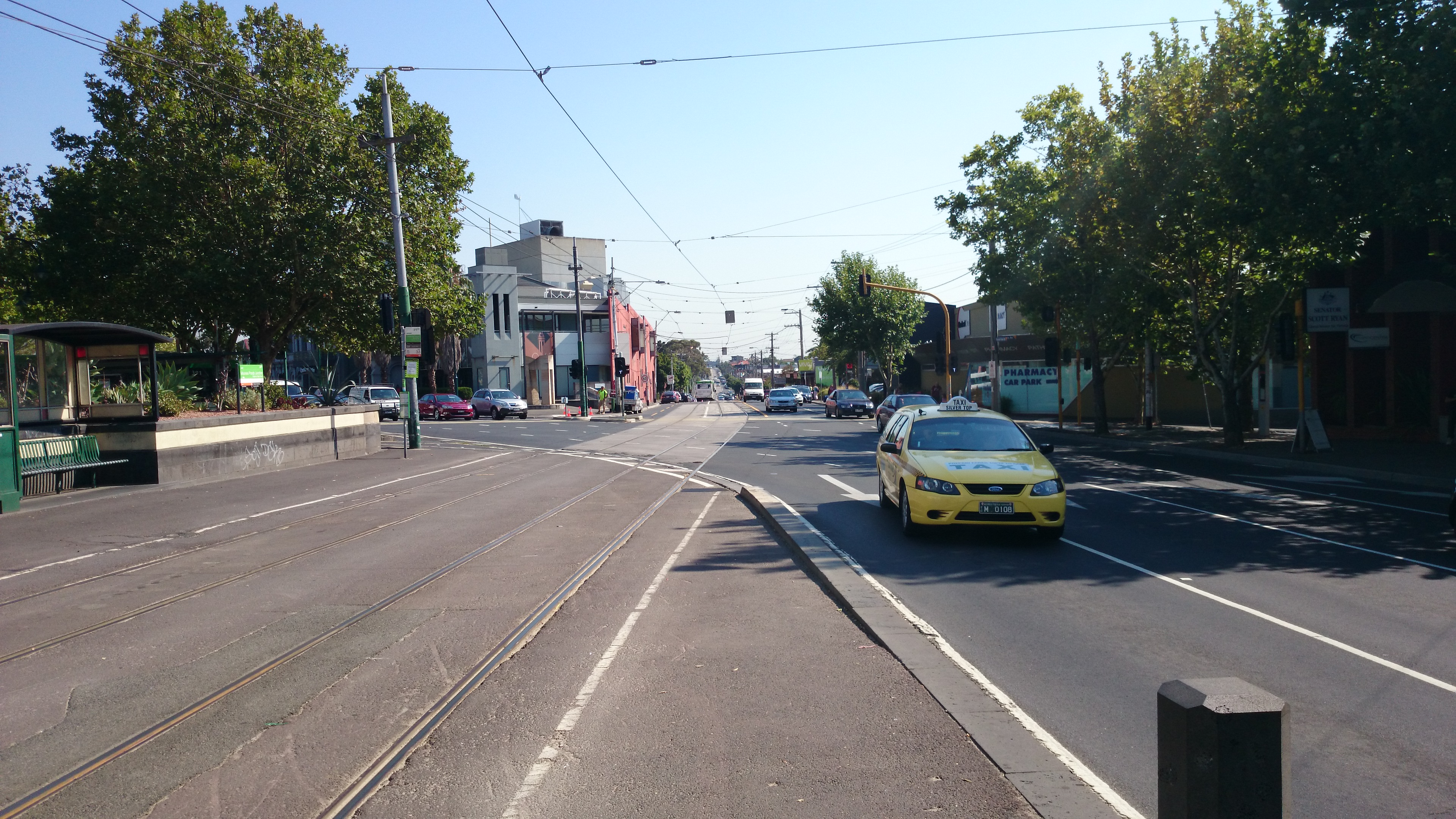
- Pascoe Vale Road in Moonee Ponds
- Coordinates: 37.640578°S 144.928781°E (North end); 37.767339°S 144.924892°E (South end)

General information
- Type: Road
- Length: 14.9 km (9.3 mi)
- Gazetted: September 1960
- Route number(s): Metro Route 35 (1965–present)

Major junctions
- North end: David Munroe Drive; Coolaroo, Melbourne
- Somerton Road; Johnstone Street; Camp Road; Western Ring Road; CityLink; Bell Street; Mount Alexander Road
- South end: Ascot Vale Road; Moonee Ponds, Melbourne

Location(s)
- Major suburbs: Meadow Heights, Dallas, Broadmeadows, Jacana, Glenroy, Oak Park, Pascoe Vale, Strathmore

Pascoe Vale Road is a major thoroughfare through the northern suburbs of Melbourne, connecting the outer northern fringe to the inner northern suburbs.

== Route ==
Pascoe Vale Road starts at the intersection with Somerton Road in Coolaroo and runs south as a four-lane, dual-carriageway road until the underpass with Camp Road and Johnstone Street in Broadmeadows, where it narrows to a four-lane, single-carriageway road. It continues south over the Western Ring Road through Glenroy, under CityLink and over the Craigieburn railway line through Strathmore, until the intersection with Fletcher Street in Essendon, where it shares surface tram tracks. It continues south to eventually terminate at Moonee Ponds Junction, where it meets Mount Alexander Road and Ascot Vale Road in Moonee Ponds.

Tram route 59 passes along the length of Pascoe Vale Road between Fletcher Street in Essendon and Moonee Ponds Junction.

== History ==
Pascoe Vale Road originally ran north from Mount Alexander Road in Moonee Ponds to Camp Road at Broadmeadows. The passing of the Country Roads Act 1958 (itself an evolution from the original Highways and Vehicles Act 1924) provided for the declaration of State Highways and Main Roads, roads partially financed by the State government through the Country Roads Board (later VicRoads). A northern extension to the existing declaration of Pascoe Vale Road, from Camp Road to the intersection with Somerton Road in Coolaroo, was declared a Main Road on 7 September 1960. Construction to eliminate the railway crossing at the Broadmeadows railway gates, where Camp Road crossed the Broadmeadows railway line and then Pascoe Vale Road, with a road-over-rail overpass in Broadmeadows, was completed in January 1978.

Pascoe Vale Road was signed as Metropolitan Route 35 between Broadmeadows North and Moonee Ponds in 1965, heading east along Barry Road to eventually meet Hume Highway in Campbellfield. It was extended further north in 1989 along the entire road, heading east along Somerton Road to eventually meet Hume Highway in Coolaroo. Metropolitan Route 35 continues south along Ascot Vale Road eventually to Laverton.

The passing of the Road Management Act 2004 granted the responsibility of overall management and development of Victoria's major arterial roads to VicRoads: in 2004, VicRoads re-declared Pascoe Vale Road (Arterial #5819) from Somerton Road in Coolaroo to Ascot Vale Road in Moonee Ponds.

== Major intersections ==
| LGA | Location | km | mi | Destinations | Notes |
|---|---|---|---|---|---|
| Hume | Coolaroo–Meadow Heights boundary | 0.0 | 0.0 | David Munroe Drive (north) – Roxburgh Park | Northern terminus of road |
| Hume | Coolaroo–Meadow Heights boundary | 0.0 | 0.0 | Somerton Road (Metro Route 58 west, Metro Route 35/58 east) – Greenvale, Somerton, Yarrambat | Metro Route 35 continues east along Somerton Road |
| Hume | Coolaroo–Meadow Heights–Broadmeadows tripoint | 2.9 | 1.8 | Barry Road – Campbellfield | |
| Hume | Broadmeadows | 5.1 | 3.2 | Dimboola Road – Broadmeadows | Access to Johnstone Street and Camp Road not otherwise available from overpass |
| Hume | Broadmeadows | 5.4 | 3.4 | Johnstone Street (Metro Route 48 west) – Tullamarine, Westmeadows; Camp Road (Metro Route 48 east) – Bundoora, Eltham | Southbound exit from Camp Road westbound only; no exit eastbound from Johnstone Street |
| Hume–Merri-bek boundary | Jacana–Broadmeadows–Glenroy tripoint | 6.4 | 4.0 | Western Ring Road (M80) – Ardeer, Laverton North | Westbound entry and eastbound exit only |
| Merri-bek | Glenroy | 7.8 | 4.8 | Glenroy Road – Hadfield | |
| Merri-bek | Pascoe Vale | 10.4 | 6.5 | Stewart Street, to Gaffney Street – Coburg North | |
| Moonee Valley | Strathmore | 11.0 | 6.8 | CityLink (M2) – Docklands, Port Melbourne | Eastbound entry and westbound exit only |
| Moonee Valley | Strathmore | 11.0 | 6.8 | Bell Street (Metro Route 40) – Coburg, Heidelberg | Entry to Bell Street via CityLink ramp |
| Moonee Valley | Strathmore | 11.7 | 7.3 | Pascoe Avenue, to Woodland Street (west) – Strathmore | |
| Moonee Valley | Strathmore–Essendon boundary | 12.2 | 7.6 | Woodland Street (east) – Pascoe Vale South | |
| Moonee Valley | Essendon | 13.1 | 8.1 | Moreland Road – Brunswick | |
| Moonee Valley | Essendon | 13.7 | 8.5 | Fletcher Street (west) – Essendon; Albion Street (east) – Brunswick East | |
| Moonee Valley | Essendon–Moonee Ponds boundary | 13.9 | 8.6 | Buckley Street – Keilor East, Essendon | |
| Moonee Valley | Moonee Ponds | 14.5 | 9.0 | Kellaway Avenue – Moonee Ponds | Pascoe Vale Road northbound from Moonee Ponds Junction via Kellaway Avenue |
| Moonee Valley | Moonee Ponds | 14.9 | 9.3 | Puckle Street (west) – Moonee Ponds; Dean Street (east) – Moonee Ponds | No right turn southbound into Puckle Street, no right turn northbound into Dean Street and Pascoe Vale Road |
| Moonee Valley | Moonee Ponds | 14.9 | 9.3 | Mount Alexander Road (northwest, southeast) – Travancore | No left turn northbound into Ascot Vale Road, no right turn northbound into Dean Street and Pascoe Vale Road |
| Moonee Valley | Moonee Ponds | 14.9 | 9.3 | Ascot Vale Road (south) – Flemington | Southern terminus of road; Metro Route 35 continues south along Ascot Vale Road |
1.000 mi = 1.609 km; 1.000 km = 0.621 mi: Incomplete access; Route transition

== Gallery ==
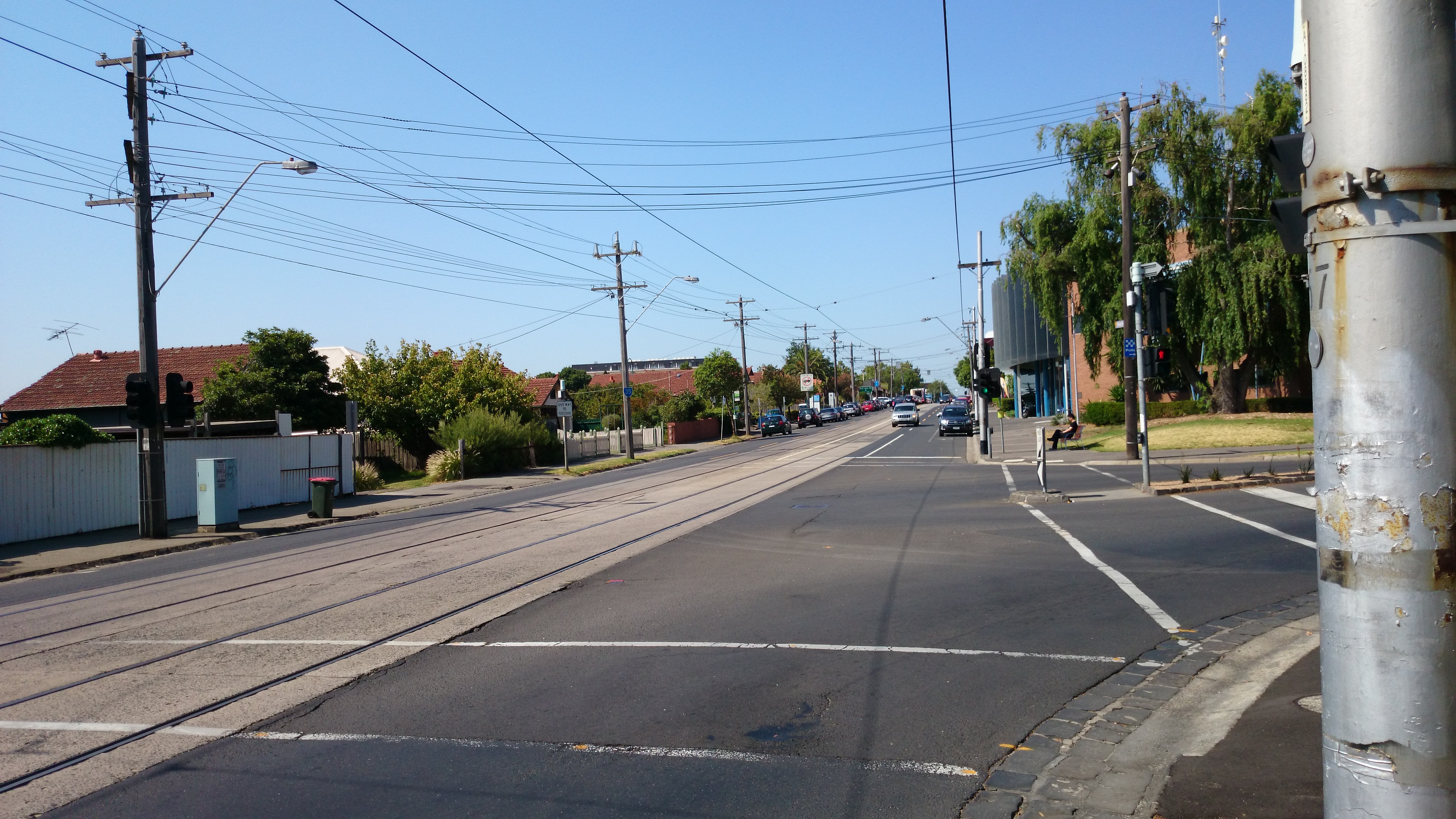
Pascoe Vale Road in Moonee Ponds

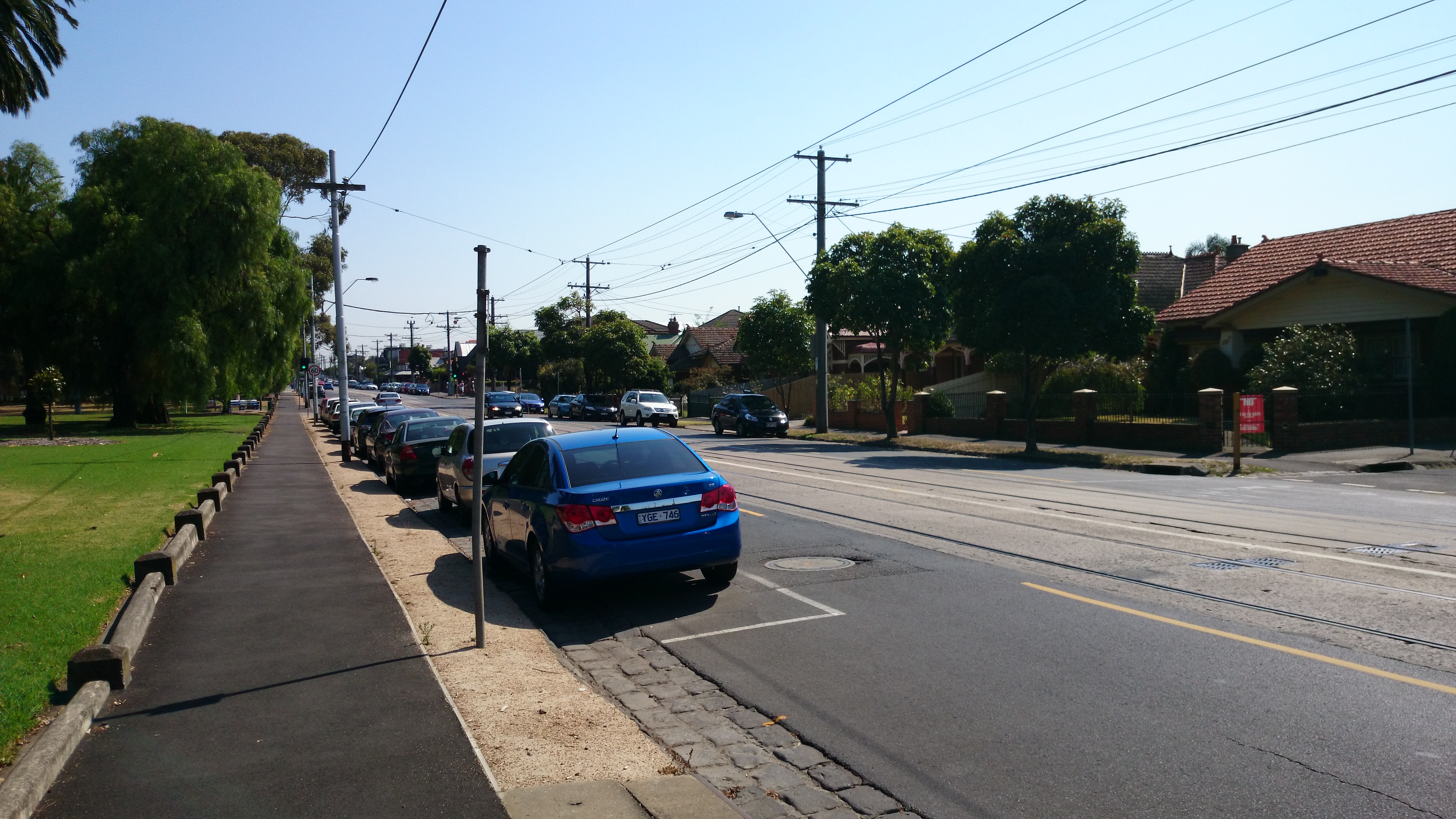
Pascoe Vale Road in Moonee Ponds
