= Valley Park =

Valley Park may refer to:

== Places ==
- Valley Park, Mississippi
- Valley Park, Missouri
- Valley Park, Oklahoma
- Valley Retail and Leisure Park in Croydon, London, UK
- Valley Park, Chandler's Ford, Hampshire, UK
- Valley Park Middle School in Flemingdon Park, Toronto, Canada
- Broadmeadows Valley Park, Melbourne, Australia
- Valley Gardens and South Cliff Gardens, Scarborough, UK, also known as Valley Park

== See also ==
- Park Valley
