= Jacana, Victoria =

Jacana
- Suburb
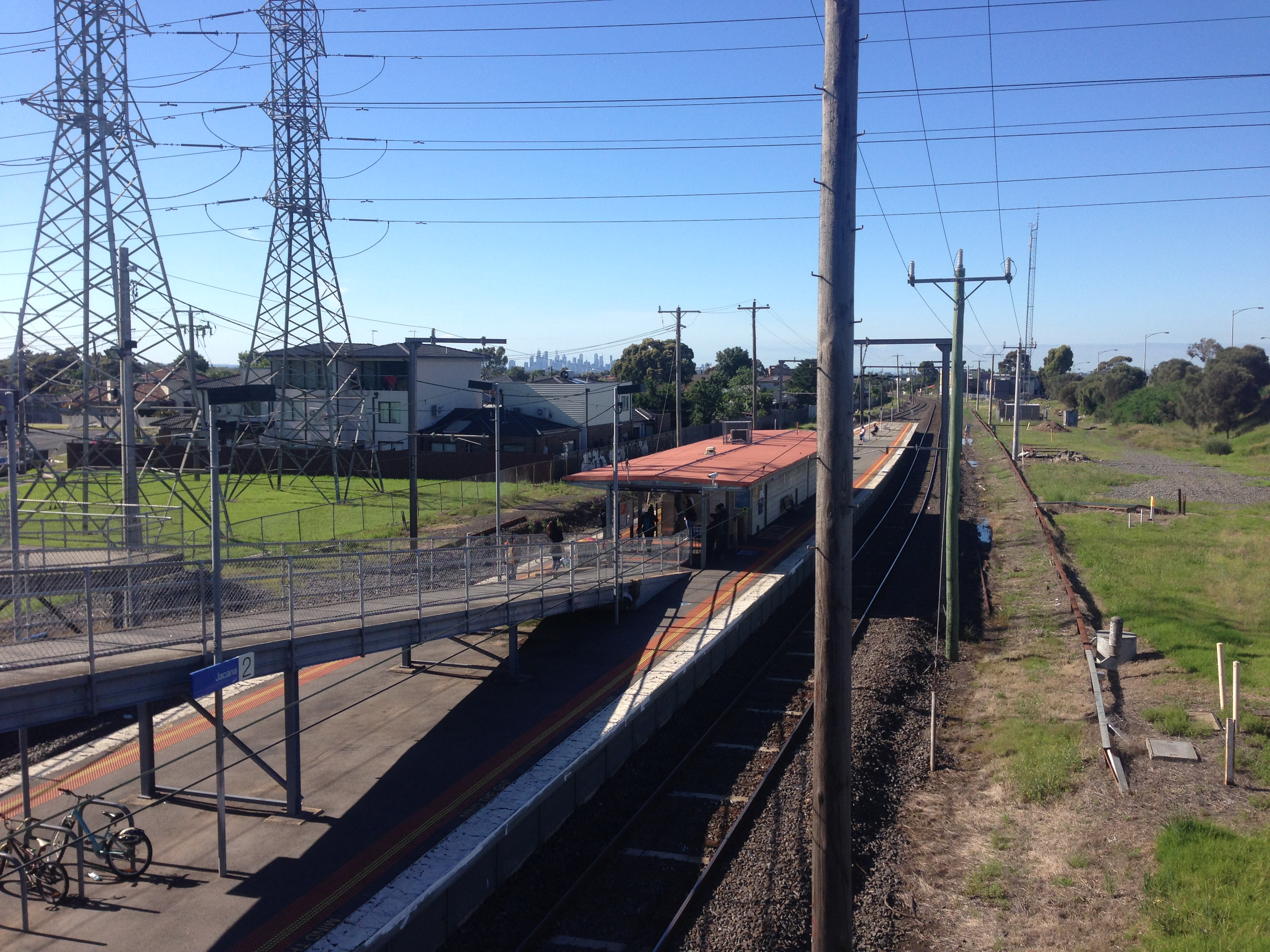
- Jacana Railway Station

- Interactive map of Jacana
- Coordinates: 37.68°S 144.912°E
- Country: Australia
- State: Victoria
- City: Melbourne
- LGA: City of Hume
- Location: 14 km (8.7 mi) N of Melbourne
- Established: 1920s

Government
  - State electorate: Broadmeadows
  - Federal divisions: Calwell; Maribyrnong

Area
  - Total: 1.2 km^{2} (0.46 sq mi)
- Elevation: 110 m (360 ft)

Population
  - Total: 2,187 (2021 census)
  - Density: 1,820/km^{2} (4,720/sq mi)
- Postcode: 3047
Suburbs around Jacana
Broadmeadows	Broadmeadows	Broadmeadows
Gladstone Park	Jacana	Broadmeadows
Gladstone Park	Glenroy	Glenroy

Jacana (/dʒəkɑːnə/) is a suburb in Melbourne, Victoria, Australia, 14 km (8.7 mi) north of Melbourne's Central Business District, located within the City of Hume local government area. Jacana recorded a population of 2,187 at the 2021 census.

Jacana is located north of the Western Ring Road, south of Johnstone Street and between the Craigieburn railway line and Moonee Ponds Creek.

== History ==
The name Jacana was applied to an area between Broadmeadows and Glenroy in the 1950s by the Housing Commission of Victoria (HCV). The name comes from Jacana Avenue, to the east of the Craigieburn railway line (therefore, technically not in Jacana itself). Both the street and the suburb are slightly to the north of the Jacana railway station, which was built to service the suburb in 1959. However, Jacana as a built landscape did not spring fully formed under the aegis of the HCV.

The streets in the southern section of Jacana were laid out in 1923, when 861 lots were offered for sale on land which had formerly been owned by Duncan Kennedy, a farmer in the area from the mid-1840s. The Housing Commission retitled some of the streets, including after prominent sports persons who competed in the 1956 Olympics), and built most of the housing stock in this section of Jacana in the 1950s. Only a few houses in Jacana—notably those in Pascoe Vale Road—predate the Housing Commission's arrival in Broadmeadows. In the late 1950s, a picture of the "daily needs" shopping centre in Emu Parade appeared in the Housing Commission's Annual Report of 1958–59, presumably because it represented the progressive and ever-expanding nature of HCV operations. As the population increased, Jacana Post Office opened on 15 May 1961. The Commission later laid out and built the northern section of Jacana in the early 1970s, the southernmost section of its showcase Meadow Fair estate. A small portion of the southern section of Jacana came under threat in the mid-1960s, when a new branch line was proposed to extend from the Broadmeadows railway line close to the site of Jacana Station, to the new Melbourne Airport. This line was not built.

Construction of the newer area of Jacana took place in the Whitlam era, which ended with the opening of the Broadmeadows Sporting Club, located on the Jacana side of the Moonee Ponds Creek Valley. The club was opened by Prime Minister Gough Whitlam on 10 November 1975—the day before his dismissal by the Governor General, John Kerr. During the 1970s, a major portion of what is now Jacana Reserve was a rubbish dump created to fill a valley containing a small tributary of Moonee Ponds Creek. This area now features two sports ovals.

As is to be expected from a former Housing Commission development in this region, Jacana is a lower-middle or working class area which, because of its planned heritage, enjoys better amenities than many privately developed or unplanned suburbs. It contains the aforementioned shops and sports club (which includes a bowling green), small playgrounds, a school and extensive parkland. The north-eastern section of the suburb is the site of the Broadmeadows Community Health Centre, relocated from a site north of Broadmeadows Central to a space long reserved for a hospital.

=== Schools ===
Jacana had a primary school (Jacana Primary School – School Number: 4839 and Motto: "Through Knowledge Success") from 1959 until 2009, where it was amalgamated with Broadmeadows West Primary School and Meadowfair North Primary School. Class sizes were large during its early years, but by its closure in 2009, attendance dropped to below 50 students.

The former school site is currently occupied by the Northern School for Autism (for primary and secondary aged students in the Northern Region of Melbourne, formerly the Preston Special Developmental School). The old school site is undergoing renovations, to the interior and exterior, expected to be completed in 2011.

=== Jacana Progress Association ===
Community facilities in the wider Broadmeadows area were generally the outcome of community agitation through progress associations. The Jacana Progress Association was formed in 1959 and concentrated most of its energies on building a community hall. The Association requested that residents donate two shillings each towards this project, and along with a series of local carnivals, had raised $2 000 by 1968. As this was insufficient to construct a hall, the Association approached non-government bodies with aspirations to locate in the area. St John Ambulance was the successful "bidder" for this and was given the money towards a hall on land that had been donated by the Housing Commission to the Association. It constructed the hall in Pascoe Vale Road, for its own and the community's use. The hall was demolished in 2012.

The Jacana Progress Association no longer exists.

== Demographics ==
ABS 2001 statistics for the Jacana reveal a suburb in which 60.4% of the population is Australian-born – the remainder from a variety of sources, only the United Kingdom (3.1%) and Italy (2.6%) exceeding 2%. In 2001 almost 10% of residents were unemployed, and 48.5% were not in the labour force (over 30% of the population is under 18 or over 65). Of those employed, almost a quarter worked in manufacturing, and just over 15% worked in retail.

The majority of Jacana housing was erected by the Housing Commission of Victoria either in the late 1950s, early 1960s or in the early 1970s. It is mainly of brick construction with pre-cast concrete elements as per the HCV method of the 1950s-60s. There are no flats. 91.3% of Jacana residents live in separate houses. 48.3% own their own home, and 26.2% are purchasing their home, a total of 74.5%. The average housing price in Jacana in 2001 was $131,750; today premium streets such as Langton Street and Freeland Grove command prices over $700,000 as a result of the housing boom earlier in the decade. While this is a major increase over a short period of time, prices in Jacana are still far below the average for Melbourne.

== Transport ==
=== Bus ===
Five bus routes service Jacana:

- 484 : Broadmeadows station – Roxburgh Park station via Greenvale. Operated by CDC Melbourne.
- 542 : Roxburgh Park station – Pascoe Vale station via Meadow Heights Shopping Centre, Broadmeadows station, Glenroy Shopping Centre (every day). Operated by Dysons.
- SmartBus 901 : Frankston station – Melbourne Airport. Operated by Kinetic Melbourne.
- SmartBus 902 : Chelsea station – Westfield Airport West. Operated by Kinetic Melbourne.
- Night Bus 959 : Melbourne CBD (Queen Street) – Broadmeadows station via Niddrie and Airport West (Saturday and Sunday mornings only). Operated by Ventura Bus Lines.

=== Cycling ===
The Moonee Ponds Creek Trail and the Western Ring Road Trail provide facilities for recreational and commuting cyclists.

=== Train ===
Jacana is served by Jacana railway station, on the Craigieburn line. Despite its name, it is located in the neighbouring suburb of Glenroy. Broadmeadows station, also on the Craigieburn line, also serves Jacana.

== Sport ==
Jacana Football Club, an Australian rules football team, competes in the Essendon District Football League.

== See also ==
- City of Broadmeadows – Jacana was previously within this former local government area.
