= Westmeadows =

- Suburb
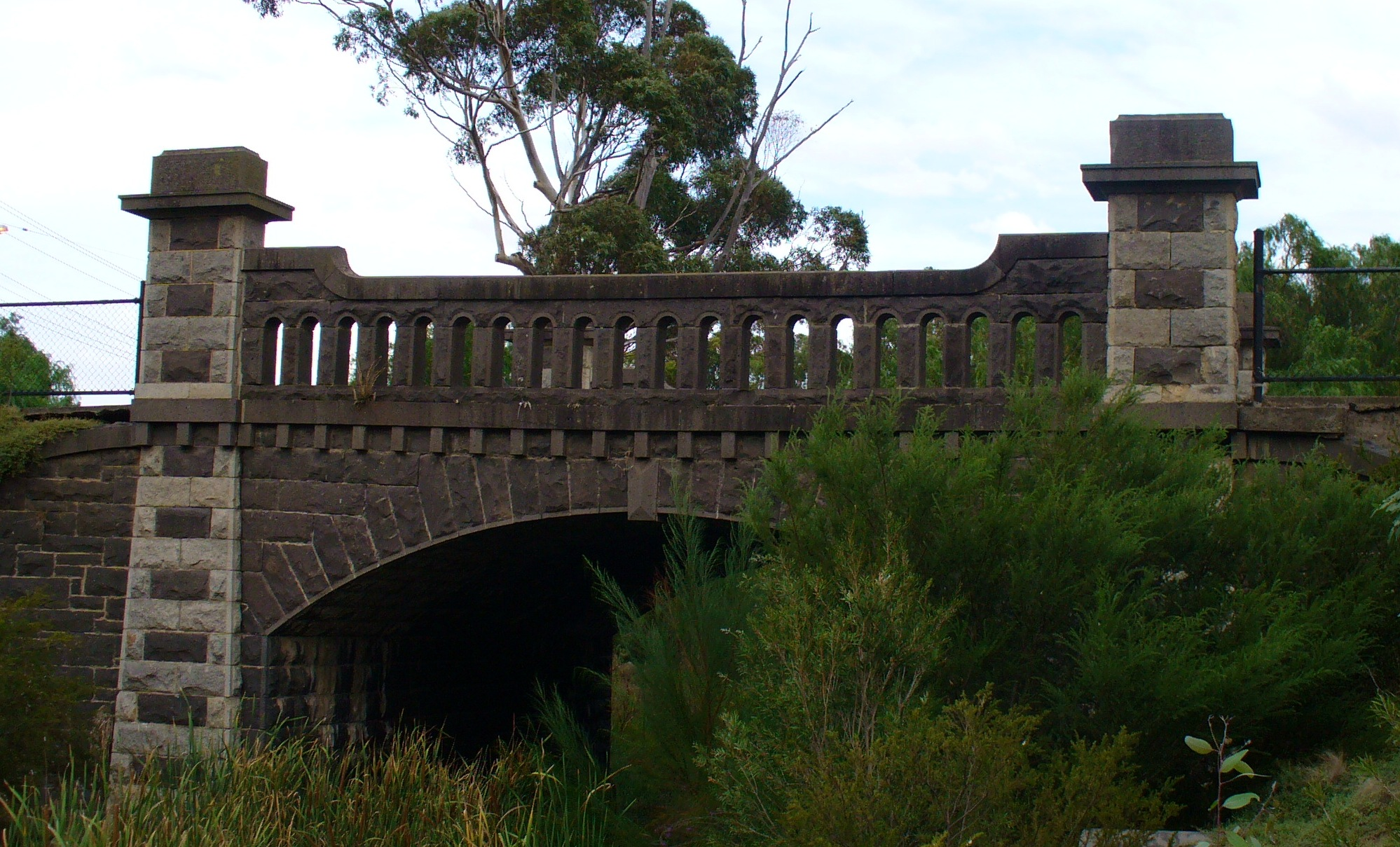
- Westmeadows Bridge

- Interactive map of Westmeadows
- Coordinates: 37.678°S 144.893°E
- Country: Australia
- State: Victoria
- City: Melbourne
- LGA: City of Hume
- Location: 16 km (9.9 mi) NW of Melbourne; 2 km (1.2 mi) W of Broadmeadows

Government
  - State electorates: Greenvale; Sunbury
  - Federal division: Calwell

Area
  - Total: 4.7 km^{2} (1.8 sq mi)
- Elevation: 100 m (330 ft)

Population
  - Total: 6,502 (2021 census)
  - Density: 1,383/km^{2} (3,580/sq mi)
- Postcode: 3049
Suburbs around Westmeadows
Attwood	Attwood	Coolaroo; Meadow Heights
Melbourne Airport	Westmeadows	Broadmeadows
Melbourne Airport; Tullamarine	Gladstone Park	Gladstone Park

Westmeadows is a suburb in Melbourne, Victoria, Australia, 16 km (9.9 mi) north-west of Melbourne's Central Business District, located within the City of Hume local government area. Westmeadows recorded a population of 6,502 at the 2021 census.

Mainly a residential suburb, Westmeadows includes the areas east and west of Mickleham Road. It borders include Yuroke Creek between Johnstone Street and Barry Road (the eastern limit), the border with Attwood (the water pipes path parallel to Toora Drive and Linga and Kenny Streets) as well as the Moonee Ponds Creek east of Mickleham Road (the northern limits) and just before the Cleanaway Landfill (the western limit). The area north of residential Westmeadows (still part of Westmeadows) contains the east–west flight path for the Melbourne Airport, Tullamarine. The land under the flight path has been kept undeveloped and is the Broadmeadows Valley Park. It contains two streams which flow into the Moonee Ponds Creek.

== History ==
The Broadmeadows area, home to the Wurundjeri Aboriginal tribe prior to European settlement, was occupied by pastoralists in the 1840s.

Westmeadows contains the original Broadmeadows Village on the Moonee Ponds Creek, but is now west of the present Broadmeadows. The first Broadmeadows township was laid out by a Government survey in 1850. Ardlie Street was its commercial centre with a hotel (the Broadmeadows Hotel, now Westmeadows Tavern), the police station and the Shire office (the District Roads Board Building, opened in 1866). The first Broadmeadows Post Office opened here on 1 January 1855, was renamed Broadmeadows West in 1955 then Westmeadows in 1963.

The Anglican Church was opened in 1850 a little to the east, a Presbyterian Church was opened in the same decade, the Vicarage for the Anglican Church in 1860 and the St Anne's Roman Catholic Church in 1867. A school begun in Westmeadows in 1851. However, the present primary school site dates from 1870.

Broadmeadows township and the urban centre began to be moved two kilometres eastwards when the railway line and station were opened in 1872. Shire loyalties clung to the old township until new civic offices were built near the railway station in 1928.

The Housing Commission began the building of a 2,226 ha. estate in the Broadmeadows area in 1949. Not until 1975 did it begin building in the vicinity of the old township, which it called Westmeadows Heights. Between 1975 and 1979 it built over 900 houses in the area.

=== Landmarks ===
There are many historic buildings and landmarks still surviving in Westmeadows. These include the Shire Offices and the Bluestone Bridge over the Moonee Ponds Creek (built in 1869, part of Fawkner Street) which are both on the Register of the National Estate. The original Westmeadows Police Station (no longer in use, since the opening of the Broadmeadows Police Station) and the Westmeadows Gaol are also still standing. The original Anglican church is still being used (presently on Raleigh Street).

The Old Coach House (10 Broad Street) c. 1860s

Local information suggests the place has been known as the Old Coach House, suggesting a connection with the coaching activities of Cobb & Co. and that it was the site of Grant's Livery Stables in 1850, a stop-over for coaches operating between Melbourne and Broadmeadows. The Coach Service ran daily from the Bush Inn in Bourke Street Melbourne, leaving there a 4:00pm and returning at 8:00am the next day (return far 4/-) (Historical Society).

== Demographics ==
The estimated population for Westmeadows, according to the 2021 census, was 6,503.

Like most of Melbourne, Westmeadows has a multicultural population. According to the 2021 census, just over two thirds (71.7%) of persons in Westmeadows were born in Australia and 28.3% being born overseas. Around one fifth (19.8%) were born overseas in a non-English speaking country. The most common overseas countries of birth were Italy and the United Kingdom.

Just over two thirds of persons in Westmeadows (67.8%) speak only English at home. The most common foreign languages spoken in Westmeadows are Italian, Turkish, Arabic (including Lebanese), and Greek.

Most of the working age class of Westmeadows is employed. The unemployment rate is 7.6%, which is slightly lower than the unemployment rate for Hume (8.4%).

== Education ==
- Westmeadows Primary School

== Sport ==
=== Sporting clubs ===
Westmeadows is represented by the following teams in their respective leagues:

- Australian rules football
  - Westmeadows Football Club, an Australian Rules football team, competes in the Essendon District Football League.
- Cricket
  - Westmeadows Cricket Club
- Tennis
  - Westmeadows Tennis Club

=== Sporting grounds ===
Westmeadows has many sporting grounds. It has an Australian rules football oval in Willowbrook Reserve, which is home to the Westmeadows Football Club and the Westmeadows Cricket Club. There is another Australian Rules/Cricket oval (with nets) in the Westmeadows Reserve near Ardlie Street. The Westmeadows Heights Reserve includes another Cricket oval (with nets) and two Soccer fields. The Westmeadows Tennis Club has six courts and is also located in Willowbrook Reserve.

== Public transport ==
=== Bus routes ===
Five bus routes service Westmeadows:

- 477 : Moonee Ponds Junction – Broadmeadows station via Essendon, Airport West and Gladstone Park. Operated by CDC Melbourne.
- 484 : Broadmeadows station – Roxburgh Park station via Greenvale. Operated by CDC Melbourne.
- SmartBus 901 : Frankston station – Melbourne Airport. Operated by Kinetic Melbourne.
- SmartBus 902 : Chelsea station – Westfield Airport West. Operated by Kinetic Melbourne.
- Night Bus 959 : Melbourne CBD (Queen Street) – Broadmeadows station via Niddrie and Airport West (operates Saturday and Sunday mornings only). Operated by Ventura Bus Lines.

=== Train ===
The closest station to Westmeadows is Broadmeadows station, on the Craigieburn line. All bus routes through Westmeadows terminate at the station.

== See also ==
- City of Broadmeadows – Westmeadows was previously within this former local government area.
