= City of Broadmeadows =

Coordinates: 37°41′06″S 144°55′30″E

- Local government area
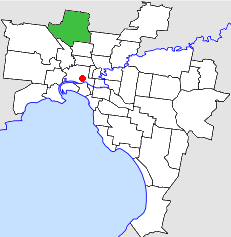
- Location in Melbourne

- The extent of the City of Broadmeadows at its dissolution in 1994
- Country: Australia
- State: Victoria
- Region: Northern Melbourne
- Established: 1857
- Council seat: Broadmeadows

Area
  - Total: 63.65 km^{2} (24.58 sq mi)

Population
  - Total: 107,900 (1992)
  - Density: 1,695.2/km^{2} (4,390.6/sq mi)
- County: Bourke
LGAs around City of Broadmeadows
| Bulla | Bulla | Whittlesea |
| Keilor | City of Broadmeadows | Preston |
| Keilor | Essendon | Coburg |

The City of Broadmeadows was a local government area about 20 kilometres (12 mi) north of Melbourne, the state capital of Victoria, Australia. The city covered an area of 63.65 square kilometres (24.58 sq mi), and existed from 1857 until 1994.

== History ==
Broadmeadows was first incorporated as a road district on 27 November 1857. It became a shire on 27 January 1871.

On 1 October 1915, as part of a series of adjustments of local government boundaries in Victoria, Broadmeadows briefly absorbed Merriang Shire, a 312-square-kilometre (120 sq mi) area, including the towns of Kalkallo, Donnybrook and Wallan and dating from 1863. Many of these areas were transferred to the Shire of Romsey on 31 May 1916.

With the arrival of reticulated water, electricity and electrified rail in the 1920s, the southern part of the shire was opened up to residential development. However, the Great Depression reduced the demand for new housing, and small farms and derelict subdivisions were major features of the landscape. The Australian Blue Book described the shire in 1949 as "comprising general farming and grazing country which stretches in a narrow strip northward from the northern suburbs of Melbourne", noting that southern areas adjoining Coburg and Essendon were "becoming definitely residential, but in other parts grazing, dairying, poultry farming and hay and grain growing is still going on".

In 1951, the Housing Commission of Victoria resumed 2,270 hectares (5,600 acres) of land near Broadmeadows, and while construction proceeded at a reasonable pace, shopping and other facilities lagged behind. In the process of developing the area, it was decided to sever the rural parts north of Somerton Road from the shire, and in 1955, parts of the Shire of Broadmeadows were severed and annexed to the Shires of Bulla, Whittlesea and Kilmore. While only 600 people were affected by the move, it represented most of Broadmeadows' land area to that point. On 30 May 1956, Broadmeadows was proclaimed a city.

On 1 October 1979, the areas of Strathmore and Strathmore Heights were transferred to the City of Essendon - a loss of 5.76 square kilometres (2.22 sq mi).

On 15 December 1994, the City of Broadmeadows was abolished; suburbs south of the Western Ring Road were transferred to the City of Moreland (now City of Merri-bek), which was created earlier in June 1994 after the merger of the Cities of Brunswick and Coburg, while suburbs north of the Western Ring Road were merged with the Shire of Bulla and parts of the Cities of Keilor and Whittlesea, into the newly created City of Hume.

In its final years, the council met at the Broadmeadows Town Hall, at Pascoe Vale Road and Dimboola Road, Broadmeadows. The facility is still used today by the City of Hume.

The last mayor of the City of Broadmeadows was Cr. Dorothy (Dot) White.

== Wards ==
On 1 April 1988, the City of Broadmeadows was subdivided into four wards, each of which elected three councillors:

- Broadmeadows Ward
- Fawkner Ward
- Glenroy Ward
- Somerton Ward

== Suburbs ==
North:

- Broadmeadows+
- Campbellfield
- Coolaroo
- Dallas*
- Gladstone Park*
- Jacana*
- Meadow Heights*
- Tullamarine (shared with the City of Keilor)
- Westmeadows

South:

- Fawkner
- Glenroy
- Hadfield
- Oak Park*
- Pascoe Vale (shared with the City of Coburg)

* Suburbs gazetted since the amalgamation.
+ Council seat.

== Population ==
| Year | Population |
|---|---|
| 1903 | 1,300 |
| 1911 | 2,100 |
| 1947 | 8,971 |
| 1954 | 23,065 |
| 1958 | 43,400* |
| 1961 | 66,306 |
| 1966 | 87,891 |
| 1971 | 101,100 |
| 1976 | 108,744+ |
| 1981 | 103,540 |
| 1986 | 101,144 |
| 1991 | 102,996 |

* Estimate in the 1958 Victorian Year Book.
+ The area annexed to City of Essendon in 1979 contained 8,892 people, so the net figure is 99,852.

== Mayors ==
| Year | Mayor | Year | Mayor | Year | Mayor |
|---|---|---|---|---|---|
| 1956 | D.H.E. Bessel J.P. | 1969-70 | R.A. Rayner J.P. | 1982-83 | L. Tartaglia J.P. |
| 1956-57 | K.J Robinson J.P. | 1970-71 | J. Coutts J.P. | 1983-84 | L. Tartaglia J.P. |
| 1957-58 | J.P. Mutton J.P. | 1971-72 | R.K. Evans J.P. | 1984-85 | M.D. Leach J.P. |
| 1958-59 | S.G. Sewell J.P. | 1972-73 | K.G. Mitchell J.P. | 1985-86 | M.W. Leahy J.P. |
| 1959-60 | E.J. Angel J.P. | 1973-74 | F.D. Mott J.P. | 1986-87 | J. Mallia J.P. |
| 1960-61 | C.B. Smith J.P. | 1974-75 | R.F. Knuckey J.P. | 1987-88 | L.A. Blundell J.P. |
| 1961-62 | A. Pope J.P. | 1975-76 | M.M. McEgan J.P. | 1988-89 | E.A. Hoctor |
| 1962-63 | R.W. Wallace J.P. | 1976-77 | R.K. Evans J.P. | 1989-90 | R. Kerr |
| 1963-64 | R.K. Evans J.P. | 1977-78 | M.M. Brown J.P. | 1990-91 | J. Mallia J.P. |
| 1964-65 | H. Payne J.P. | 1978-79 | W.J. Turner J.P | 1991-92 | M. Stone J.P. |
| 1965-66 | J.A. Culpin J.P. | 1979-80 | W.J. Turner J.P. | 1992-93 | K.P. Sheahan |
| 1966-67 | J.P. Mutton J.P. | 1980-81 | A.S. Barry J.P. | 1993-94 | A.A. Simic |
| 1967-68 | D.H.C. Bucknell J.P. | 1981-82 | L. Tartaglia J.P. | 1994-95 | D. White |
| 1968-69 | M.M. Brown J.P. | 1982-83 | P.T. Bryant J.P. | | |
