= Broadmeadows Valley Park =

Park in Melbourne, Victoria, Australia

Coordinates: 37°39′57″S 144°54′56″E

Broadmeadows Valley Park is an area of undeveloped land stretching from the northern extents of Meadow Heights to the southern extents of Jacana in Melbourne, Victoria, Australia.

A section of the Moonee Ponds Creek flows through the park with a bike track running alongside it.

The park includes several sporting grounds with two Australian rules football ovals under the name Jacana Reserve located on Johnstone Street, Jacana. Also an athletics track and three soccer pitches under the name John Ilhan Memorial Reserve located on Barry Road, Broadmeadows

Located in an area of the park situated in Meadow Heights are the Shankland Wetlands which house a range of introduced and native water birds, including ducks.
