= Coolaroo railway station =

Railway station in Coolaroo, Melbourne, Australia

Coolaroo
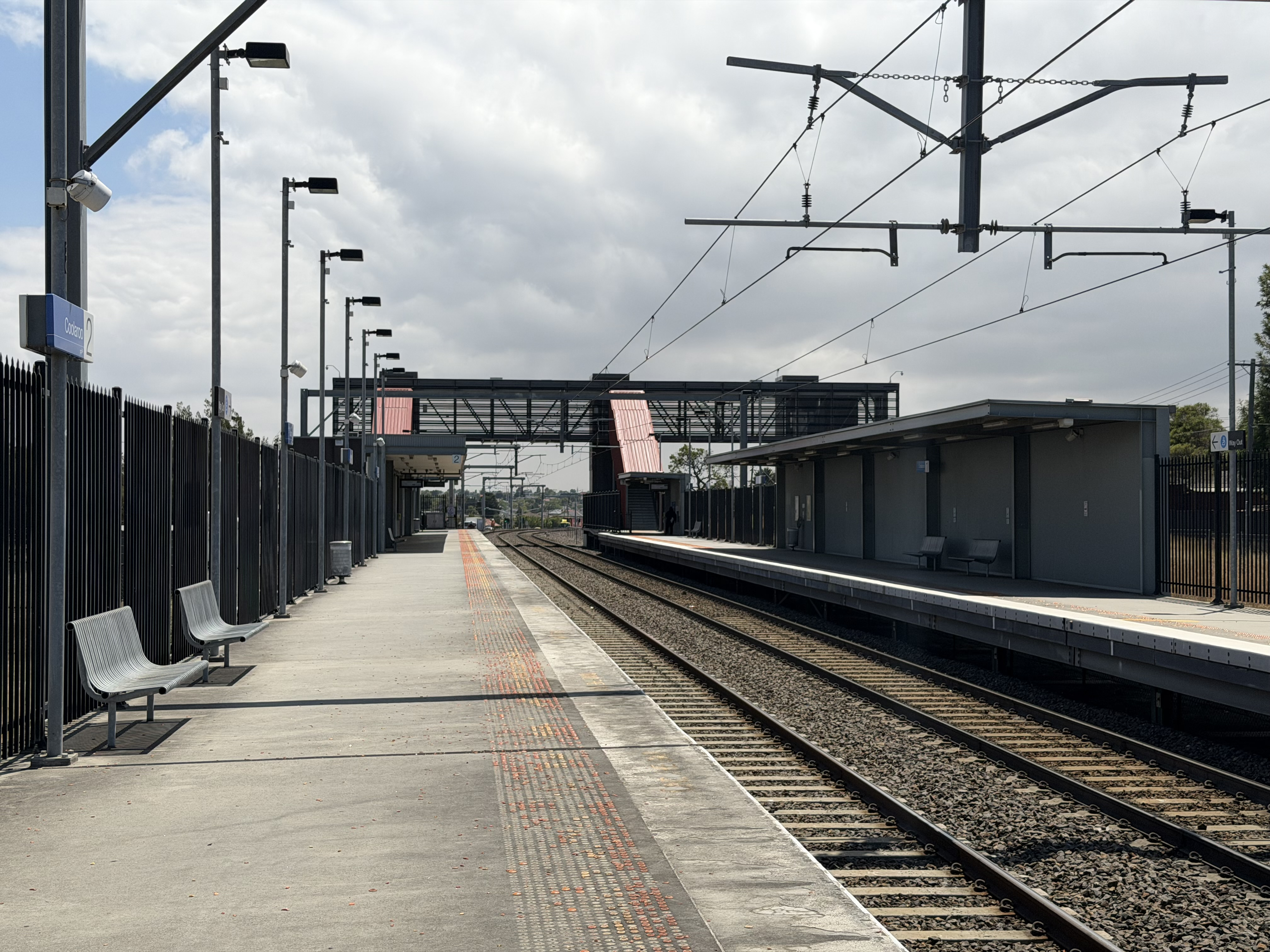
- Northbound view from Platform 2, January 2026

General information
- Location: Pascoe Vale Road, Coolaroo, Victoria 3048; City of Hume; Australia
- Coordinates: 37°39′36″S 144°55′34″E
- System: PTV commuter rail station
- Owner: VicTrack
- Operator: Metro Trains
- Line: Craigieburn
- Distance: 19.31 kilometres from Southern Cross
- Platforms: 2 side
- Tracks: 3
- Connections: Bus

Construction
- Structure type: Ground
- Parking: 490
- Cycle facilities: 26
- Accessible: Yes – step free access

Other information
- Status: Operational, unstaffed
- Station code: CLO
- Fare zone: Myki zone 2
- Website: Public Transport Victoria

History
- Opened: 6 June 2010; 16 years ago
- Electrified: July 2007 (1500 V DC overhead)

Passengers
2005–2018 numbers
2009–2010	9,903
2010–2011	194,701 ▲1866%
2011–2012	228,529 ▲17.37%
2012–2013	Not measured
2013–2014	242,394 ▲6.07%
2014–2015	260,461 ▲7.45%
2015–2016	310,727 ▲19.29%
2016–2017	316,582 ▲1.88%
2017–2018	332,613 ▲5.06%
- 2018–2019: 335,750 ▲0.94%
- 2019–2020: 274,750 ▼18.17%
- 2020–2021: 105,150 ▼61.7%
- 2021–2022: 114,400 ▲8.79%
- 2022–2023: 189,850 ▲65.95%
- 2023–2024: 253,750 ▲33.66%
- 2024–2025: 281,400 ▲10.9%

Services
Preceding station	Metro Trains	Following station
Broadmeadows towards Flinders Street	Craigieburn line	Roxburgh Park towards Craigieburn
Track layout
Location

Coolaroo station is a railway station operated by Metro Trains Melbourne on the Craigieburn line, part of the Melbourne rail network. It serves the northern suburb of Coolaroo in Melbourne, Victoria, Australia. Coolaroo station is a ground-level unstaffed station, featuring two side platforms. It opened on 6 June 2010.

== History ==
Originally scheduled for completion by the 1980s, under the 1969 Melbourne Transportation Plan, the Victorian Government set aside $38 million for the construction of the station in the 2007/2008 State Budget. Completion was expected in 2010, with the project re-announced as part of the state government Victorian Transport Plan in December 2008. Although long proposed, the station was built separately to the 2007 electrification of the line from Broadmeadows to Craigieburn.

The railway past the site of Coolaroo station originally opened in 1872, as part of the North East line to School House Lane. In December 2008, to allow construction of Platform 1, work on the slewing of the parallel standard gauge track commenced, and was completed by January 2009. In August of that year, work on the lift wells was underway, with the main span of the footbridge lifted into place in October of that year.

On 6 June 2010, the station was opened by then Premier of Victoria, John Brumby, and then Minister for Transport, Martin Pakula.

== Platforms and services ==
Coolaroo has two side platforms. It is serviced by Metro Trains' Craigieburn line services.

Coolaroo platform arrangement
Platform	Line	Destination	Via	Service Type	Notes	Source
1	Craigieburn line	Flinders Street	City Loop	All stations	See City Loop for operating patterns	
2	Craigieburn line	Craigieburn		All stations		

== Transport links ==
Three bus routes operate via Coolaroo station, under contract to Public Transport Victoria:

- 540 : Upfield station – Broadmeadows station (operated by CDC Melbourne)
- SmartBus 901 : Frankston station – Melbourne Airport (operated by Kinetic Melbourne)
- Night Bus 953 : Broadmeadows station – Craigieburn (Saturday and Sunday mornings only) (operated by Ventura Bus Lines)

== Gallery ==
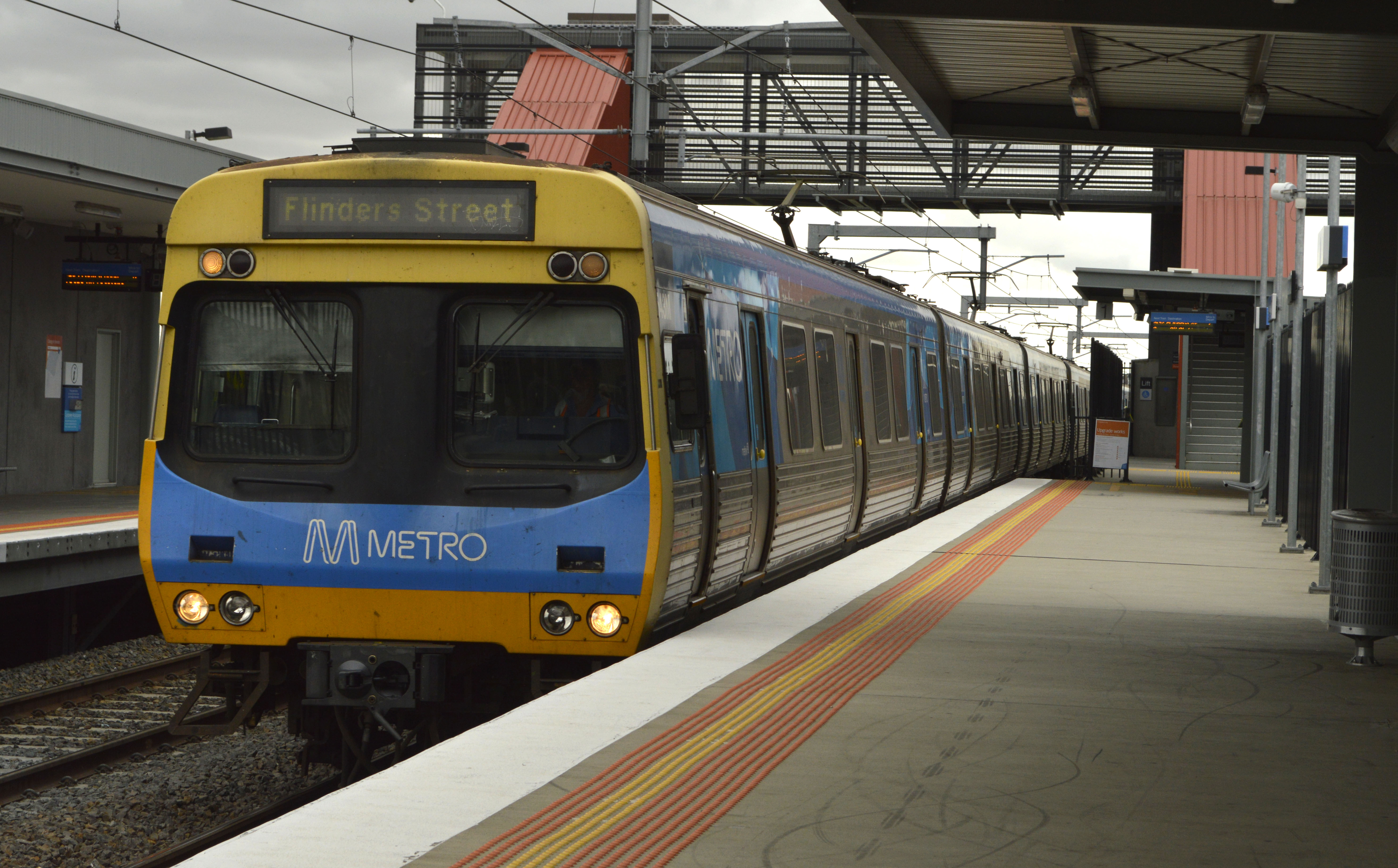
A Comeng train on a Flinders Street-bound service arrives at Platform 1, April 2013
