= Coolaroo =

- Suburb
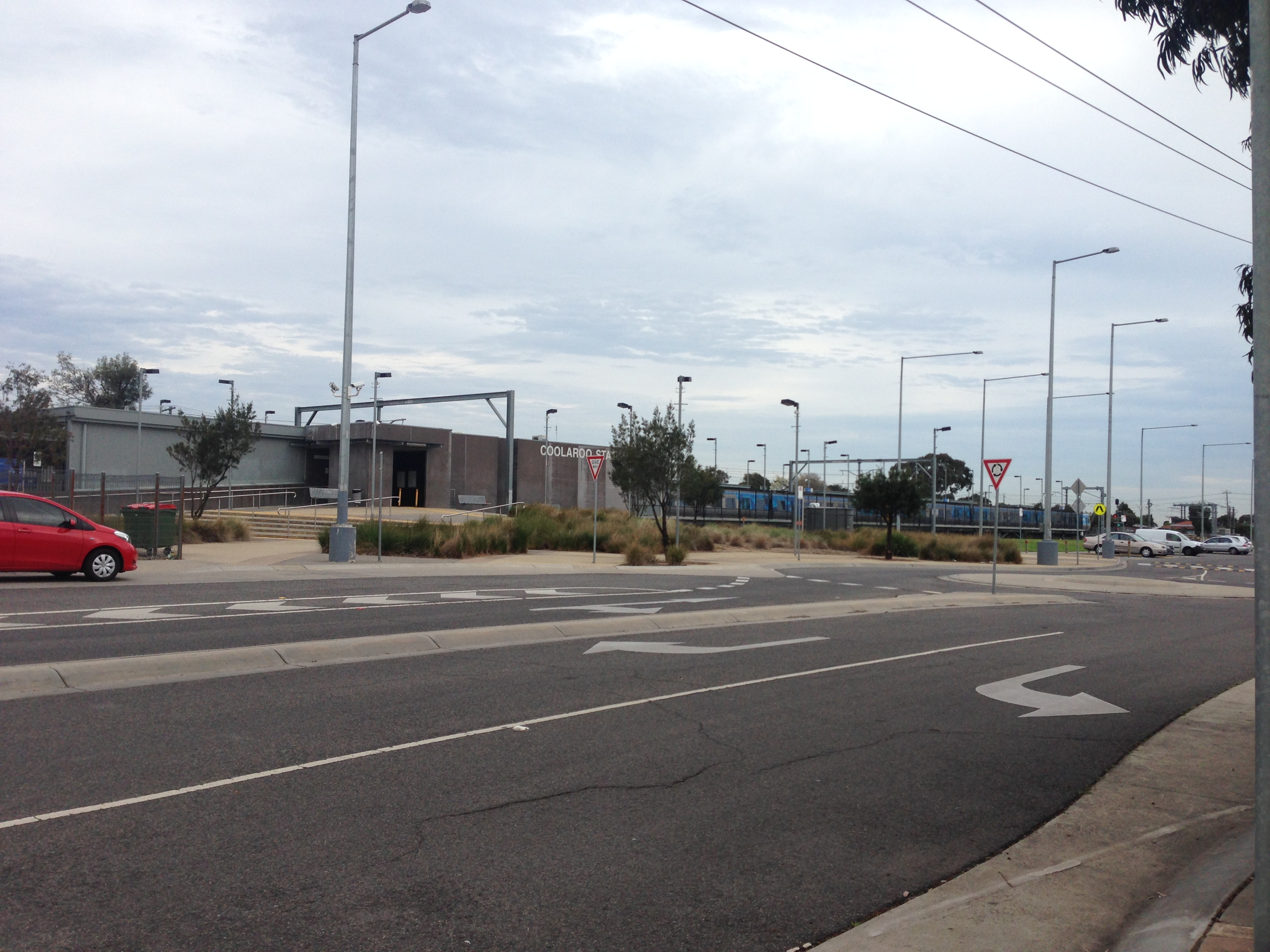
- Coolaroo railway station in October 2019

- Interactive map of Coolaroo
- Coordinates: 37.657°S 144.927°E
- Country: Australia
- State: Victoria
- City: Melbourne
- LGA: City of Hume
- Location: 18 km (11 mi) N of Melbourne

Government
  - State electorate: Broadmeadows
  - Federal division: Calwell

Area
  - Total: 3 km^{2} (1.2 sq mi)

Population
  - Total: 3,193 (2021 census)
  - Density: 1,060/km^{2} (2,800/sq mi)
- Postcode: 3048 (shared with Meadow Heights)
Suburbs around Coolaroo
Roxburgh Park	Roxburgh Park	Somerton
Meadow Heights	Coolaroo	Campbellfield
Broadmeadows; Westmeadows	Dallas	Campbellfield

Coolaroo is a suburb in Melbourne, Victoria, Australia, 18 km (11 mi) north of Melbourne's Central Business District, located within the City of Hume local government area. Coolaroo recorded a population of 3,193 at the 2021 census.

== History ==
Coolaroo is thought to be derived from an Aboriginal word meaning 'brown snake'. The area was acquired by the Housing Commission of Victoria in 1951 for housing estates, with construction not commencing until 1966. Until the late 1990s, Coolaroo's boundaries extended past the railway line and Pascoe Vale Road into the area that is now known as Meadow Heights.

== Population ==
In the 2016 census, there were 3,191 people in Coolaroo. 51.7% of people were born in Australia. The next most common countries of birth were Iraq 9.2%, Turkey 5.5% and Lebanon 3.8%. 37.9% of people spoke only English at home. Other languages spoken at home included Arabic 14.4%, Turkish 11.8% and Assyrian Neo-Aramaic 8.1%, The most common responses for religion were Islam 28.8%, Catholic 23.2% and No Religion 14.4%.

== Education ==
- Coolaroo South Primary School
- St. Mary's Coptic Orthodox College

== Facilities ==
Most of the shopping centres near Coolaroo are located in neighbouring suburbs, including Meadow Heights, which has the Meadow Heights Shopping Centre and Dallas Shopping Centre (Dobell Place and Dargie Court), to the south.

== Transport ==
=== Bus ===
Four bus routes service Coolaroo:

- 532 : Craigieburn station – Broadmeadows station via Upfield station. Operated by CDC Melbourne.
- 540 : Upfield station – Broadmeadows station via Coolaroo. Operated by Dysons.
- 542 : Roxburgh Park station – Pascoe Vale station via Meadow Heights, Broadmeadows and Glenroy. Operated by Dysons.
- 901 : Frankston station – Melbourne Airport (SmartBus service). Operated by Kinetic Melbourne.

=== Train ===
Coolaroo railway station is located on the Craigieburn line. It opened to passengers on Sunday 6 June 2010, almost 40 years after plans for a station first surfaced. Coolaroo is also served by Upfield station, which is the terminus for the Upfield line. The station is located on Barry Road, and the station and railway line acts as the suburb boundary between Coolaroo and Campbellfield.

== Environmental issues ==
In 2017, some residents in Dallas were evacuated after a fire which started in SKM recycling plants in Coolaroo emitted smoke and ashes impacting local neighbourhoods. 210 residents launched an action and the Supreme Court ordered SKM to pay $1.2 million. SKM was declared insolvent after totalling up to $5.5 million in debt.

In 2019, EPA Victoria removed more than 145,000 tonnes of contaminated waste at Glass Recovery Services in Coolaroo and around 9million litres of polluted water after discovering several stockpile hotspots being at risk of fire. 20 criminal charges were raised against the company and director.

== In popular culture ==
The popular 1997 Australian film The Castle was set in Coolaroo, although the house featured was actually located in Strathmore.

== See also ==
- City of Broadmeadows – Coolaroo was previously within this former local government area.
