= Campbellfield =

- Suburb
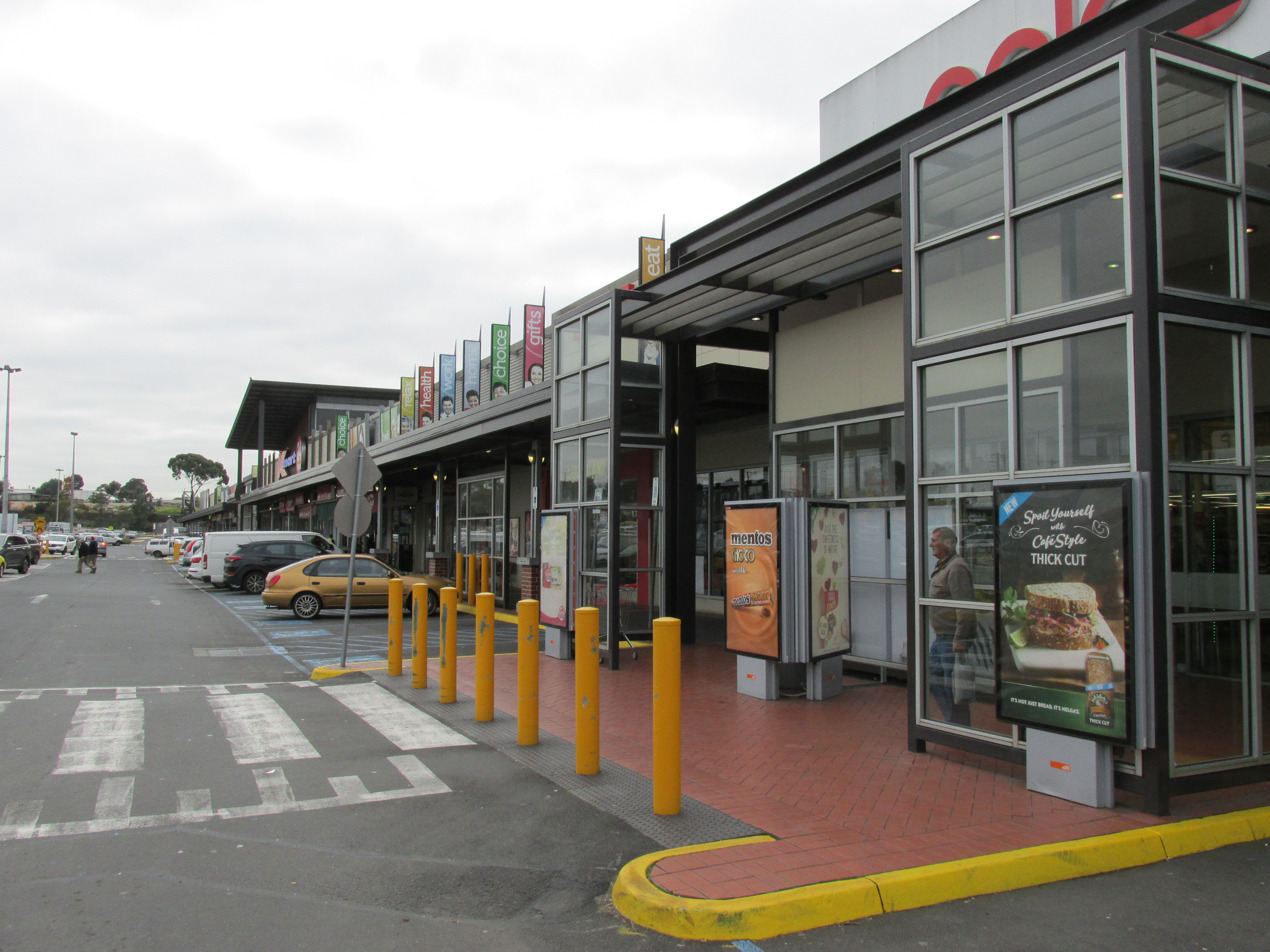
- Campbellfield Plaza Shopping Centre

- Interactive map of Campbellfield
- Coordinates: 37.673°S 144.957°E
- Country: Australia
- State: Victoria
- City: Melbourne
- LGA: City of Hume
- Location: 13 km (8.1 mi) N of Melbourne

Government
  - State electorate: Broadmeadows
  - Federal divisions: Calwell; Scullin

Area
  - Total: 12.4 km^{2} (4.8 sq mi)
- Elevation: 105 m (344 ft)

Population
  - Total: 4,977 (2021 census)
  - Density: 401.4/km^{2} (1,040/sq mi)
- Postcode: 3061
Suburbs around Campbellfield
Roxburgh Park	Somerton	Epping
Coolaroo; Dallas	Campbellfield	Lalor; Thomastown
Broadmeadows	Fawkner	Reservoir

Campbellfield is a suburb in Melbourne, Victoria, Australia, 13 km (8.1 mi) north of Melbourne's Central Business District, located within the City of Hume local government area. Campbellfield recorded a population of 4,977 at the 2021 census.

== History ==
Campbellfield was named after two unrelated families named Campbell bought farm lots in the area in the 1840s. The land at that time was lightly timbered, which made it easy for grazing, plus also due to its proximity to the Merri Creek.

The first Broadmeadows Post Office was open briefly in 1854 in Campbellfield. It reopened on 1 June 1856 and closed in 1893, replaced by the Campbellfield railway station office. This, in turn, was renamed Campbellfield around 1903.

Campbellfield is home to Victoria's oldest church in east Broadmeadows. The Scots church was built on Sydney Road in 1842, and replaced by the present blue stone structure in 1855. It was placed on the National Estate and Victorian Heritage Register, and has been an icon of Victorian history.

== Today ==
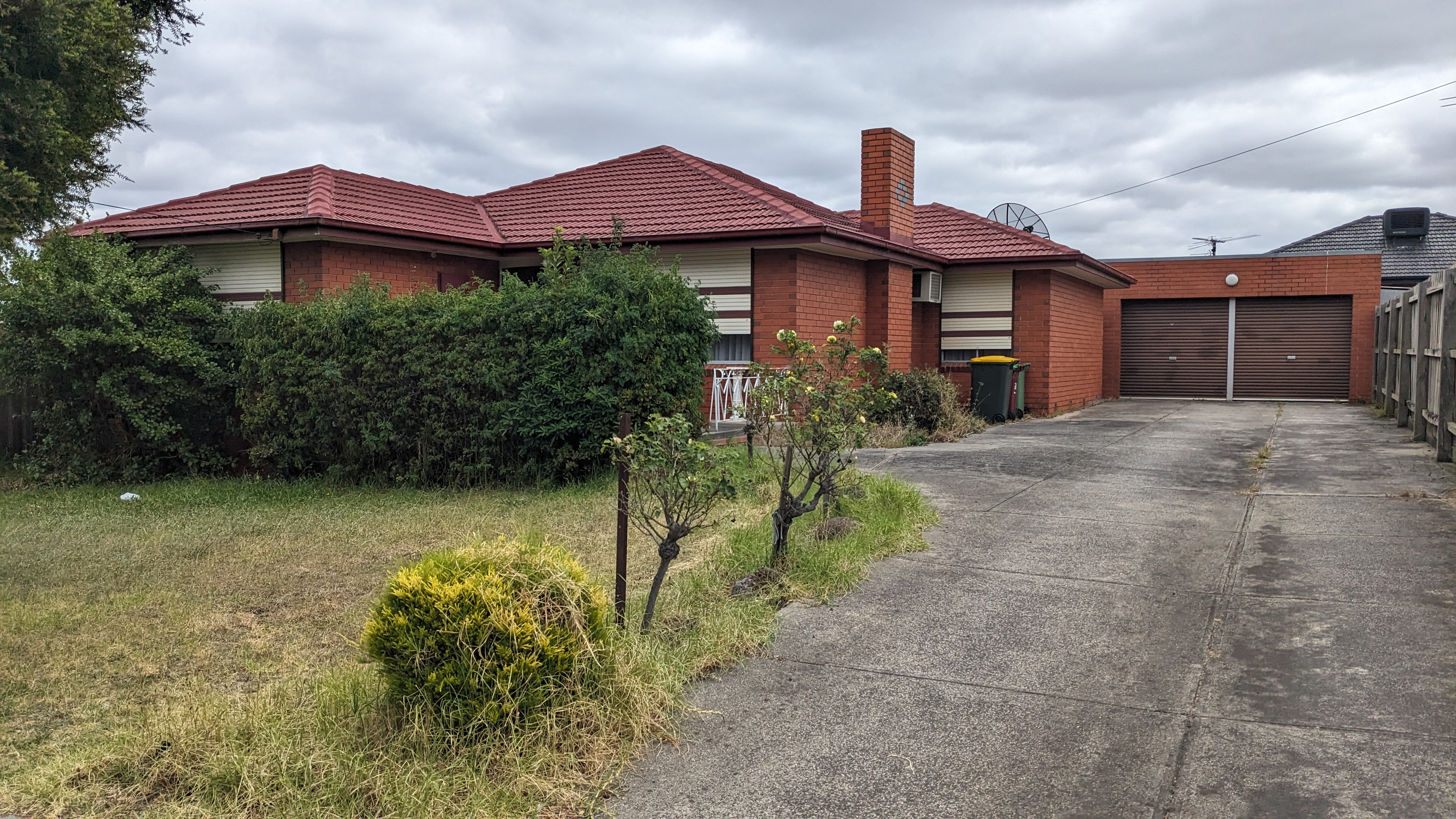
A brown brick house typical of those built in the 1960s in Campbellfield.

Campbellfield was home to the Ford Australia's Broadmeadows Assembly Plant. Built in 1959, it is where the Falcon and Territory models were last manufactured in Australia. The Ford factory closed in October 2016 with the loss of 650 jobs.

Campbellfield is a mixed residential and industrial/business suburb, with various industrial areas and business parks around the suburb. In 2011–2012, it was listed in the top four of Melbourne's most crime-ridden suburbs, and bottom five of Melbourne's most livable suburbs.

The suburb has one public school (Campbellfield Heights Primary School). There are currently no private or secondary schools.

Campbellfield has a strip of shops on Barry Road known as Fordgate, and a shopping plaza on Sydney Road.

Merlynston Creek has its source in National Boulevard Nature Reserve in Campbellfield just north of the Ford plant and next to the disused single track railway line.

== Population ==
In the 2021 census, there were 4,977 people in Campbellfield. 46% of people were born in Australia. The next most common countries of birth were Iraq 10.1%, Lebanon 8.6%, Italy 5.1%, Turkey 3.6% and Greece 2.4%. 23.7% of people spoke only English at home. Other languages spoken at home included Arabic 27.3%, Chaldean Neo-Aramaic 7.3%, Italian and Turkish 6.1% and Greek 4.4%. The most common responses for religion were Islam 38.4% and Catholic 29.8%.

In the 2016 census, there were 5,056 people in Campbellfield. 42.5% of people were born in Australia. The next most common countries of birth were Iraq 11.5%, Lebanon 8.3%, Italy 5.7%, Turkey 3.6% and Greece 2.2%. 18.2% of people spoke only English at home. Other languages spoken at home included Arabic 28.5%, Sureth 13.4%, Italian 7.7%, Turkish 7.3% and Greek 4.6%. The most common responses for religion were Islam 35.1% and Catholic 35.0%.

== Transport ==
=== Bus ===
Six bus routes service the suburb:

- 530: Campbellfield Plaza – Coburg via Fawkner, operated by CDC Melbourne.
- 531: Upfield station – Coburg North via Somerset Estate, operated by CDC Melbourne
- 532: Craigieburn station – Broadmeadows station via Upfield station, operated by CDC Melbourne
- 538: Somerset Estate – Broadmeadows station via Camp Road, operated by Dysons
- 540: Upfield station – Broadmeadows station via Coolaroo, operated by Dysons
- 902: Chelsea station – Westfield Airport West, operated by Kinetic Melbourne

=== Train ===
Campbellfield has one railway station, Upfield, which is the terminus of the Upfield line. The station is located on Barry Road, with the station and railway line acting as the suburban boundary between Campbellfield and Coolaroo. Broadmeadows station, on the Craigieburn line, is another nearby station.

There was a Campbellfield railway station, located adjacent to Camp Road, from 1889 until 1956, when it was closed to make way for the newly built Upfield station, which was located in a position more accessible to the community.

== Environmental issues ==
In August 2020, a toxic fire erupted at MRI e-cycle solutions, a large e-waste operator, causing loud explosions audible from kilometres away. The company stored and recycled electronic waste including up to 20 tonnes of batteries and 60 tonnes of e-waste coming from retailers, companies, schools and local governments. These waste are known to be toxic to health and the environment when damaged or close to fires. While battling the blaze for a day, some contaminated water also spread out into Merlynston Creek and Jack Roper Lake in Broadmeadows.

The company was previously asked by EPA Victoria in March to stop accepting material and manage all combustible and recyclable material according to their waste management policy. In November 2020, EPA suspended MRI's operation licence.

== See also ==
- City of Broadmeadows – Campbellfield was previously within this former local government area.
- 2019 Campbellfield factory fire
