= Dallas, Victoria =

Dallas
- Suburb
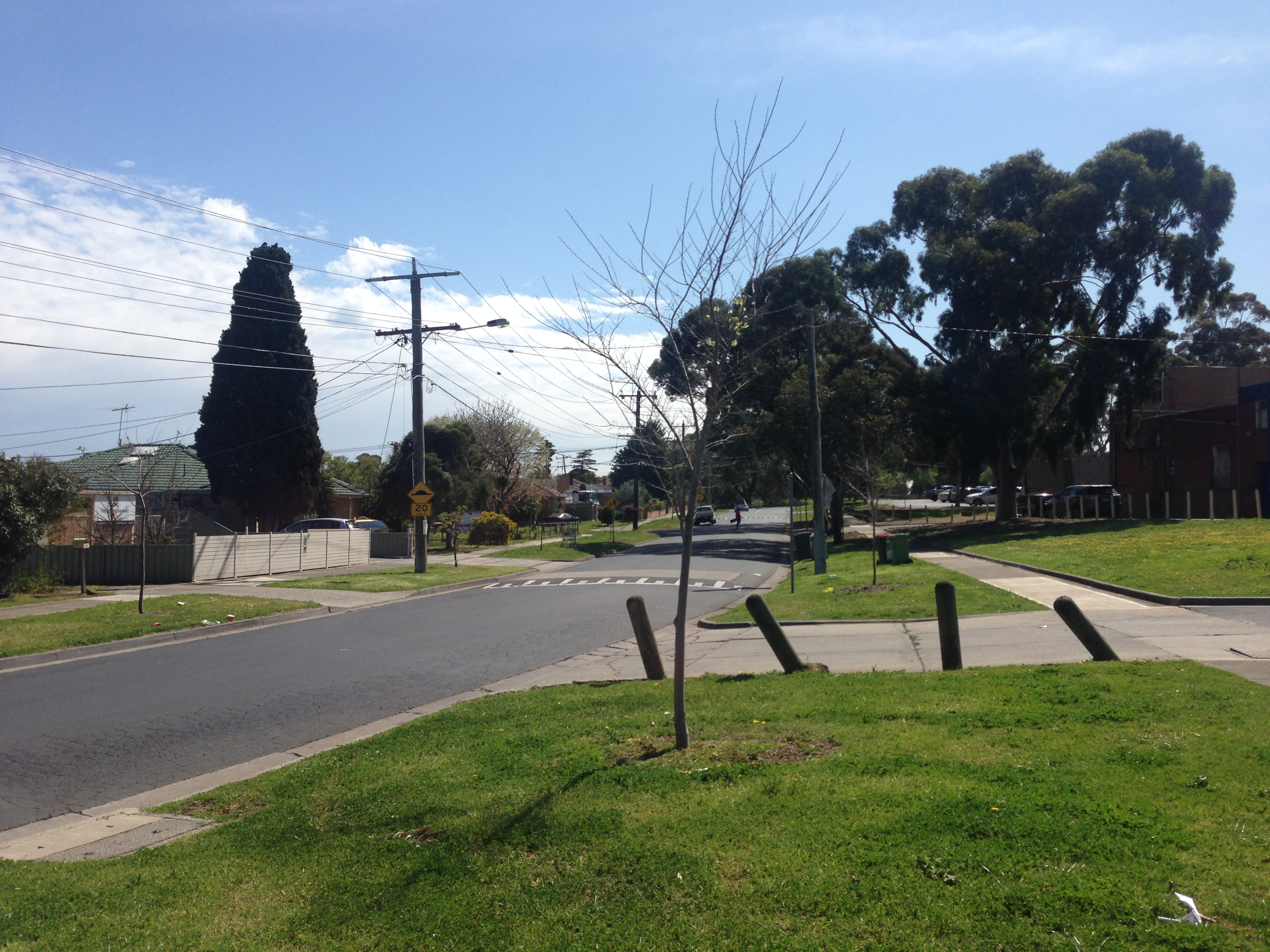
- Millewa Crescent, Dallas

- Interactive map of Dallas
- Coordinates: 37.668°S 144.94°E
- Country: Australia
- State: Victoria
- City: Melbourne
- LGA: City of Hume
- Location: 17 km (11 mi) N of Melbourne

Government
  - State electorate: Broadmeadows
  - Federal division: Calwell

Area
  - Total: 2.4 km^{2} (0.93 sq mi)

Population
  - Total: 6,762 (2021 census)
  - Density: 2,820/km^{2} (7,300/sq mi)
- Postcode: 3047
Suburbs around Dallas
Coolaroo	Coolaroo	Campbellfield
Broadmeadows	Dallas	Campbellfield
Broadmeadows	Broadmeadows	Broadmeadows

Dallas is a suburb in Melbourne, Victoria, Australia, 17 km (11 mi) north of the central business district, located within the City of Hume local government area. Dallas recorded a population of 6,762 at the 2021 census. It has no connection to the city of the same name in the U.S state of Texas.

Dallas is bounded by Barry Road in the north, the Upfield railway line in the east, Geach Street, Terang Street, Tempy Court, Dallas Drive and Riggall Street in the south, and the Craigieburn/North East railway line in the west.

== History ==
Dallas was named after the Governor of Victoria, General Sir Reginald Dallas Brooks. The Housing Commission of Victoria built many of the houses in the Dallas area between 1961 and 1970. The Dallas Primary School was built in 1963. Dallas North Primary opened in 1965. Dallas Post Office opened on 21 February 1966, but from 1968 to 1995 was known as Broadmeadows before reverting to Dallas.

Prior to the construction of the suburb, the Dallas area was primarily used for agriculture. In 1924, the Melbourne & Metropolitan Board of Works built a reservoir for reticulating water for the Broadmeadows area.

== Population ==
At the 2016 census, Dallas had a population of 6,810. The most common ancestries were Turkish 20.0%, Australian 10.0%, Lebanese 9.1%, English 8.1% and Iraqi 2.8%. 43.5% of people were born in Australia. The next most common countries of birth were Turkey 11.3%, Iraq 5.9%, Lebanon 4.0%, Pakistan 2.5% and India 1.8%. 22.8% of people spoke only English at home. Other languages spoken at home included Turkish 23.1%, Arabic 17.4%, Assyrian Neo-Aramaic 3.1%, Urdu 3.0% and Vietnamese 2.3%. The most common responses for religion were Islam 49.3% and Catholic 15.6%.

Dallas has one of the highest concentrations of Muslims in Australia, at 49% of the population. The Broadmeadows Mosque is located on King Street.

== Education ==
- Sirius College - Dallas Campus
- Hume Central Secondary College
- Holy Child Catholic Primary School
- Dallas Brooks Community Primary School (winner of the Melbourne Prize)
- Ilim College Girls and Primary
- Ilim College Boys
- Hume Valley School Narrun Campus

== Transport ==
=== Bus ===
Two bus routes service Dallas:

- 532 : Craigieburn station – Broadmeadows station via Upfield station, operated by CDC Melbourne
- 540 : Upfield station – Broadmeadows station via Coolaroo, operated by Dysons

=== Train ===
The nearest railway stations to Dallas are Coolaroo and Broadmeadows, both on the Craigieburn line, and Upfield station, on the Upfield line.

== See also ==
- City of Broadmeadows – Dallas was previously within this former local government area.
