= Fawkner =

- Suburb
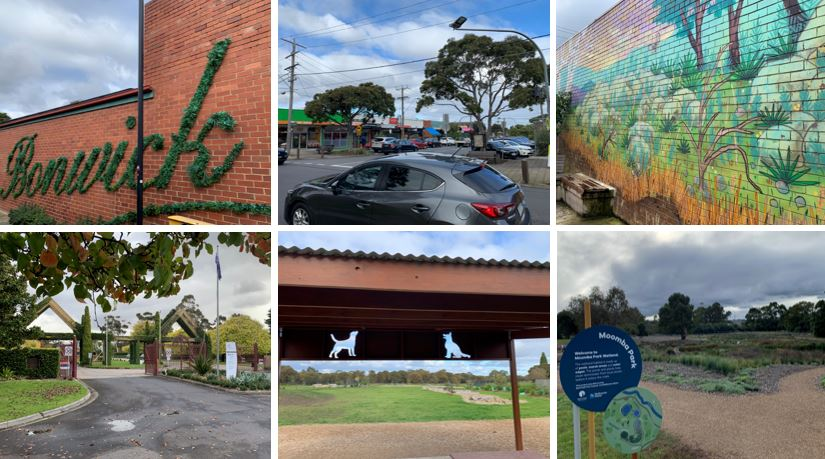
- Top left across and down: Bonwick Street Sign, Bonwick Street, Fawkner Street Art, Fawkner Cemetery, Moomba Park Dog Park, Moomba Park Wetlands

- Interactive map of Fawkner
- Coordinates: 37.707°S 144.968°E
- Country: Australia
- State: Victoria
- City: Melbourne
- LGAs: City of Hume; City of Merri-bek
- Location: 12 km (7.5 mi) N of Melbourne; 5 km (3.1 mi) SE of Broadmeadows; 4 km (2.5 mi) N of Coburg

Government
  - State electorate: Broadmeadows
  - Federal divisions: Scullin; Wills

Area
  - Total: 5.1 km^{2} (2.0 sq mi)
- Elevation: 77 m (253 ft)

Population
  - Total: 14,274 (2021 census)
  - Density: 2,799/km^{2} (7,250/sq mi)
- Postcode: 3060
Suburbs around Fawkner
Broadmeadows; Glenroy	Campbellfield	Thomastown
Glenroy; Hadfield	Fawkner	Reservoir
Coburg North	Coburg North	Reservoir

Fawkner is a suburb in Melbourne, Victoria, Australia, 12 km (7.5 mi) north of Melbourne's Central Business District, located within the Cities of Hume and Merri-bek local government areas. Fawkner recorded a population of 14,274 at the 2021 census.

The major portion within the City of Merri-bek is bounded by Merri Creek on the east, Sydney Road and the Upfield railway line on the west, the Western Ring Road on the north and Boundary Road on the south separating the suburb from Coburg North. The smaller portion within the City of Hume extends north to Camp Road and Mahoneys Road.

== History ==
The area was originally called and was part of Box Forest, named by Melbourne settler pioneer, John Pascoe Fawkner. In 1867 John Jukes bought a parcel of land in the area and named it Fawkner in honour of the pioneer settler. John Jukes grandson, David Jukes, continued to live in the area until the 1970s.

One of the original settlers in Fawkner was Michael Dowling and his family, who settled on their property at Major Road near Merri Creek in September 1902, grazing cattle to fatten for market. Miss Dowling described the area then as a harsh windy place with few trees and a few unfinished shacks.

The first school in the area was the Fawkner State School, opened 1909, on Lynch Road. The school was decommissioned in the 1990s and was subsequently purchased in 1997 by the Quang Duc Buddhist Welfare Association to build the Quang Duc Temple.

The opening of the Upfield railway line on 8 October 1889 (electrified to Fawkner on 2 December 1920); and the development and opening of the Fawkner General Cemetery in December 1906 encouraged residential development in the south of the suburb.

By 1910 there were 35 houses within walking distance of Fawkner station.

Electricity was extended to Fawkner in 1920 by the City of Coburg Electricity Supply Department. Returned soldiers started settling the suburb in the 1920s. By 1939 post office directories listed 180 buildings in Fawkner.

North Fawkner remained a dairy farm owned by the Coyne family until 1945. The period after World War II saw the most significant period of development in the suburb, with the first public housing built by the Housing Commission in 1949 and continuing up until the 1960s, with the development of the Moomba Park estate, named after the initial Labour Day Moomba Parade held in 1955. Other facilities established included the Fawkner Swimming Pool in 1964, and Fawkner Library in 1969.

The Post Office opened in 1878 as Box Forest, was renamed Fawkner in 1885 and closed in 1888. The next Fawkner office was open in 1904 and 1905. The third (known briefly as Faulkner) was open from 1909 until renamed Fawkner South in 1960. The fourth was open from 1960 until renamed Fawkner East in 1970, when the current Fawkner office opened. In addition, a Fawkner West office was open from 1962 until 1993, and the Fawkner North office on Anderson Road in the Moomba Park area opened in 1961.

The suburb was transferred from the City of Broadmeadows to the City of Moreland (now City of Merri-bek) in December 1994, when the Victorian Government forced local government mergers.

== Population ==
According to Merri-bek Council's suburb profile, Fawkner has a larger percentage of population aged over 70 years (17.7%) and aged from 5 to 11 years (8.9%), than the average for the municipality (11.8% and 7.0% respectively).

The suburb also has a lower proportion – In Fawkner, 45.2% of people were born in Australia. The most common countries of birth were Italy 9.7%, Pakistan 8.9%, as against the municipal average of 59.3%.

The most common responses for religion in Fawkner were Catholic 33.5%, Islam 31.9%, No Religion, so described 10.1%, Not stated 8.0% and Eastern Orthodox 6.0%. In Fawkner, Christianity was the largest religious group reported overall (49.1%) (this figure excludes not stated responses).

In Fawkner, 31.1% of people only spoke English at home. Other languages spoken at home included Italian 13.8%, Urdu 12.4%, Arabic 9.2%, Greek 4.1% and Bengali 2.9%.

== Facilities ==
=== Shopping ===
The main commercial areas in Fawkner are the strip bordering Sydney Road, which is mainly automotive-related and light-industrial, and the Bonwick Street shopping strip. There are a number of corner shops and small shopping strips dotted about the residential area. Bonwick Street offers a wide range of shops including Italian cuisine as well as cafés. There is a small shopping area on Major Road, with a local IGA grocery store and few small restaurants.

=== Schools ===
Within the suburb of Fawkner, there are two government primary schools: Fawkner Primary and Moomba Park Primary. Two Catholic primary schools were also built: St. Matthew's PS and St. Mark's PS (1934). Fawkner Secondary College began in 1956 and an Islamic college, Darul Ulum College of Victoria, was established in 1997 on the grounds of the former Fawkner North Primary school. Historically, the Fawkner Technical School was built on the site west of the Moomba Park Primary School at the same time the primary school was established. Fawkner Technical School eventually closed in 1992, and was demolished to make way for residential allotments. Bruce Smeaton, composer and musician taught at this school which started out as an exclusive boys school of high repute.

=== Transport ===
==== Bus ====
Three bus routes service Fawkner:

- 530 : Campbellfield Plaza Shopping Centre – Coburg via Fawkner, operated by CDC Melbourne
- 531 : Upfield station – Coburg North via Somerset Estate, operated by CDC Melbourne
- SmartBus 902 : Chelsea station – Westfield Airport West, operated by Kinetic Melbourne

==== Cycling ====
The Upfield Bike Path, Merri Creek Trail and the Western Ring Road Trail provide facilities for recreational and commuting cyclists.

==== Train ====
Fawkner is served by Gowrie railway station, which is located on the Upfield railway line, and provides rail-based public transport to the Melbourne CBD. The station and the Upfield line acts as the suburb boundary between Fawkner and Glenroy. Fawkner is also served by Fawkner railway station, also on the Upfield line. Despite its name, the station is actually located in the neighbouring suburb of Hadfield, within the Fawkner Crematorium and Memorial Park.

=== Post offices ===
There is a small Australia Post office on Major Road, whereas the main GPO is on Bonwick Street.

=== Leisure Centre ===
Fawkner Leisure Centre is situated on Jukes Road and has indoor and outdoor swimming pools, gym, a child care centre and trampoline.

=== Reserves ===
Fawkner has three major reserves: Charles Mutton Reserve, home ground for the Fawkner Bowling Club; Northern Saints; Moomba Park, home ground for Moreland United; and CB Smith Reserve, home ground for the Fawkner Blues Soccer Club. There is also significant open space along the Merri Creek.

=== Religious settlement ===
- St Matthew's Catholic Church
- St Mark's Catholic Church
- Presbyterian Church
- The Greek Orthodox Parish of St Nektarios
- The Great Prophet Islamic Centre
- Dar ul Uloom Mosque
- Quang Duc Temple Vietnamese Mahayana Buddhist Temple, named after Thich Quang Duc

== In popular culture ==
Fawkner was briefly in the news after Microsoft Flight Simulator 2020 included a mysterious nonexistent towering skyscraper in Fawkner at launch.

== See also ==
- City of Broadmeadows – Fawkner was previously within this former local government area.
