= Broadmeadows Central =

- Location: Broadmeadows, Victoria, Australia
- Coordinates: 37°40′49″S 144°55′10″E
- Opened: 1974; 52 years ago
- Manager: First Sentier Investors
- Owner: First Sentier Investors
- Num. of stores: 199
- Num. of anchor tenants: 10
- Floor area: 61,463 m^{2} (661,580 sq ft)
- Floors: 1
- Website: www.broadmeadowscentral.com.au

Broadmeadows Central is a single-level enclosed shopping centre in the northern Melbourne suburb of Broadmeadows. It has annual turnover of $322M, and a total retail area of 61,463 m^{2} (661,580 sq ft).

The centre is anchored by Kmart, Coles, Woolworths, Aldi, TK Maxx, The Reject Shop, Best & Less, Cotton On Mega, JB Hi-Fi, Hoyts and Chemist Warehouse.

== History ==
The centre opened in 1974 as 'Meadow Fair' shopping centre (the old jingle going, "Meadow Fair See You There") and went through major reconstructions in 1995 and 2003. In mid-2006 the centre opened its doors to the new entertainment precinct adding JB-Hi Fi, Novo and Dick Smith, while connecting the Hoyts cinema complex and the La Porchetta and Anatolian restaurants.

Target closed its store in the centre in late 2016 and was replaced with Kmart However Kmart originally opened in the centre in 1999 .

Along with a store in Box Hill Central, Big W Broadmeadows closed in January 2021.
