= Hadfield, Victoria =

Hadfield
- Suburb
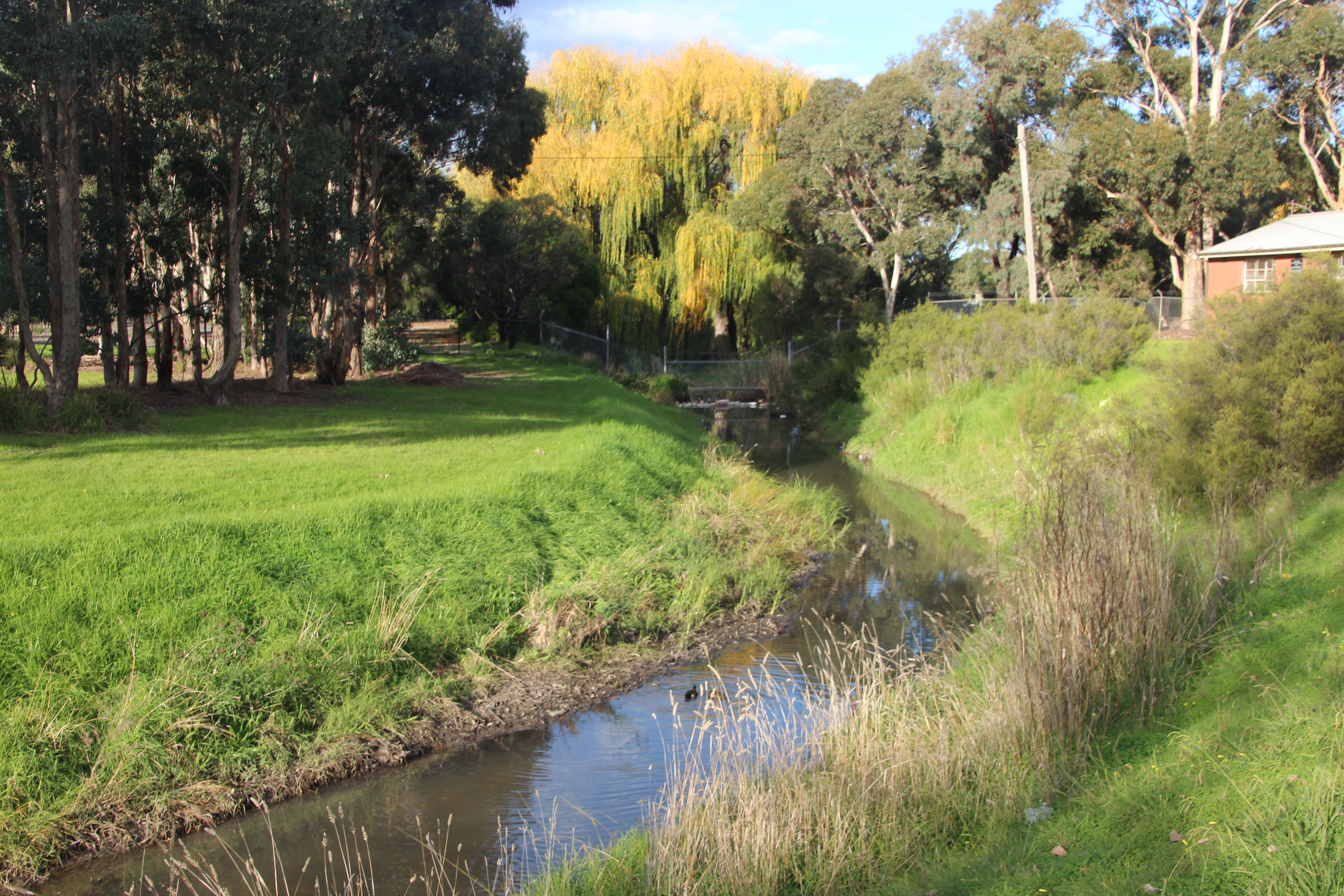
- Merlynston Creek, Hadfield, 2017

- Interactive map of Hadfield
- Coordinates: 37.71°S 144.95°E
- Country: Australia
- State: Victoria
- City: Melbourne
- LGA: City of Merri-bek
- Location: 12 km (7.5 mi) N of Melbourne; 2 km (1.2 mi) W of Fawkner; 2 km (1.2 mi) E of Glenroy

Government
  - State electorates: Broadmeadows; Pascoe Vale
  - Federal division: Wills

Area
  - Total: 3 km^{2} (1.2 sq mi)
- Elevation: 77 m (253 ft)

Population
  - Total: 6,269 (2021 census)
  - Density: 2,100/km^{2} (5,400/sq mi)
- Postcode: 3046
Suburbs around Hadfield
Glenroy	Glenroy	Fawkner
Glenroy	Hadfield	Fawkner
Pascoe Vale	Coburg North; Pascoe Vale	Coburg North

Hadfield is a suburb in Melbourne, Victoria, Australia, 12 km (7.5 mi) north of Melbourne's Central Business District, located within the City of Merri-bek local government area. Hadfield recorded a population of 6,269 at the 2021 census.

The suburb of Hadfield is bounded by West Street in the west, South Street and Boundary Road in the south, Sydney Road in the east and Hilton Street in the north. It is located between Fawkner and Glenroy and falls within the 3046 postcode.

Major features of the area include the Fawkner Crematorium and Memorial Park, the West Street Shopping Centre and the Merlynston Creek.

== History ==
Hadfield originally formed part of the John Pascoe Fawkner estate. Significant development occurred in Hadfield after World War II, and the Hadfield post office was opened on 6 May 1957.

The suburb is named after Rupert Hadfield, who was a president of the Broadmeadows Shire Council. However, the website Australia for Everyone; Place Names, claims another origin.

The site of the former Hadfield High School, which operated from 1964 to 1992, before being absorbed into Box Forest Secondary College, is now occupied by Pascoe Vale Gardens, a retirement village.

=== Heritage listings ===
The following place in Hadfield is listed on the Victorian Heritage Register:

- Fawkner Crematorium and Memorial Park, at 1817 Sydney Road

== Demographics ==
In 2011, Hadfield had a population of 5,366. The median age was 39 years. Children aged 0 – 14 years made up 18.2% of the population and people aged 65 years and over made up 21.0%. The most common ancestries were Italian 17.9%, Australian 15.3%, English 12.8%, Lebanese 8.3% and Greek 5.2%. The most common responses for religion were Catholic 42.9%, Islam 17.1%, No Religion 9.1%, Eastern Orthodox 6.9% and Anglican 5.7%. The suburb has a high proportion of 5–17 year olds and over 70 year olds in comparison to the City of Merri-bek average, as well as a high proportion of Italian -Greek, Lebanese and Maltese residents.

== Shopping ==
There are several small shopping districts within Hadfield, the most prominent being on West Street, with others on South Street, North Street and East Street.

== Sport ==
Hadfield Football Club, an Australian Rules football team, competes in the Essendon District Football League.

== Transport ==
=== Bus ===
Four bus routes serve Hadfield:

- 527 : Gowrie station – Northland Shopping Centre via Murray Road. Operated by Ventura Bus Lines.
- 534 : Glenroy station – Coburg via Boundary Road and Sydney Road. Operated by Dysons.
- 536 : Glenroy station – Gowrie station via Gowrie Park. Operated by Dysons.
- Night Bus 951 : Brunswick station – Glenroy station via West Coburg (operates Saturday and Sunday mornings only). Operated by Ventura Bus Lines.

=== Cycling ===
The Upfield Bike Path and the Western Ring Road Trail provide facilities for recreational and commuting cyclists.

=== Train ===
One railway station serves Hadfield: Fawkner, on the Upfield line. Despite its name, the station is in Hadfield, and is located within the Fawkner Crematorium and Memorial Park. Other nearby stations include Glenroy and Oak Park, both on the Craigieburn line, and Gowrie, on the Upfield line.

== See also ==
- City of Broadmeadows – Hadfield was previously within this former local government area.
