= Broadmeadows =

- Suburb
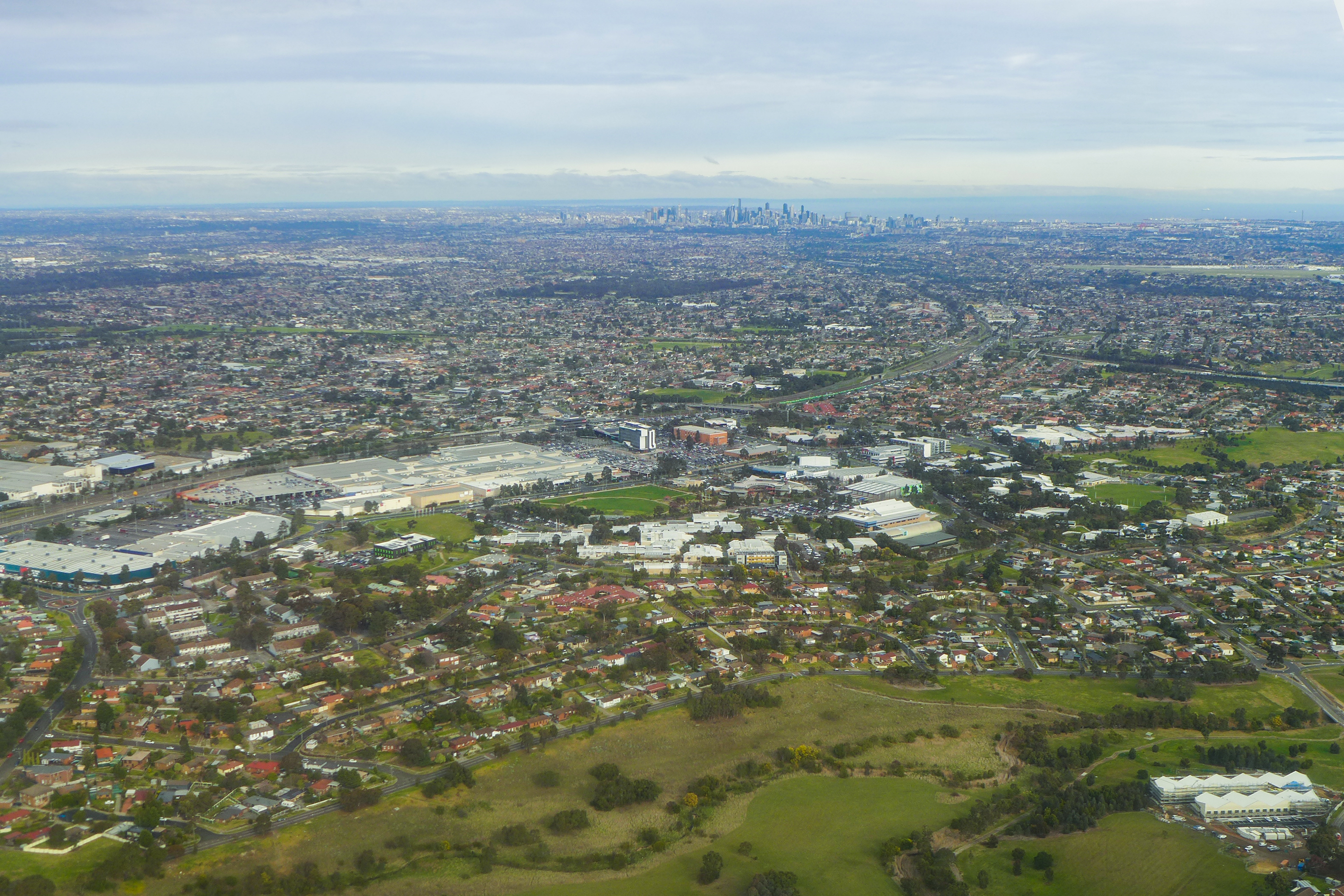
- Aerial view of Broadmeadows (2017)

- Interactive map of Broadmeadows
- Coordinates: 37.685°S 144.925°E
- Country: Australia
- State: Victoria
- City: Melbourne
- LGA: City of Hume
- Location: 15 km (9.3 mi) N of Melbourne
- Established: 1850s

Government
  - State electorate: Broadmeadows
  - Federal division: Calwell

Area
  - Total: 8.4 km^{2} (3.2 sq mi)
- Elevation: 124 m (407 ft)

Population
  - Total: 12,524 (2021 census)
  - Density: 1,491/km^{2} (3,862/sq mi)
- Postcode: 3047
Suburbs around Broadmeadows
Westmeadows	Dallas	Campbellfield
Westmeadows	Broadmeadows	Campbellfield
Gladstone Park; Jacana	Glenroy	Fawkner

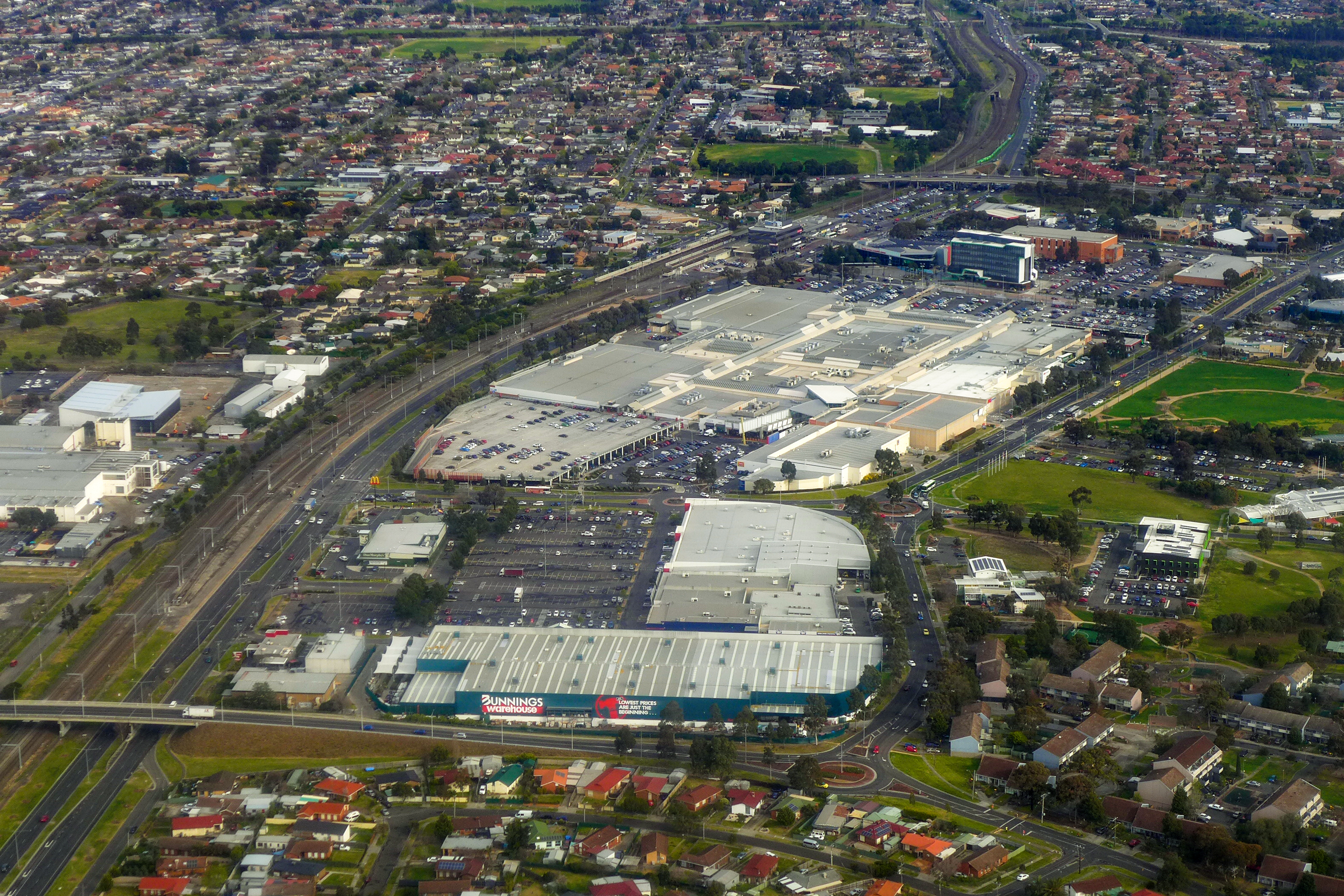
Broadmeadows Central

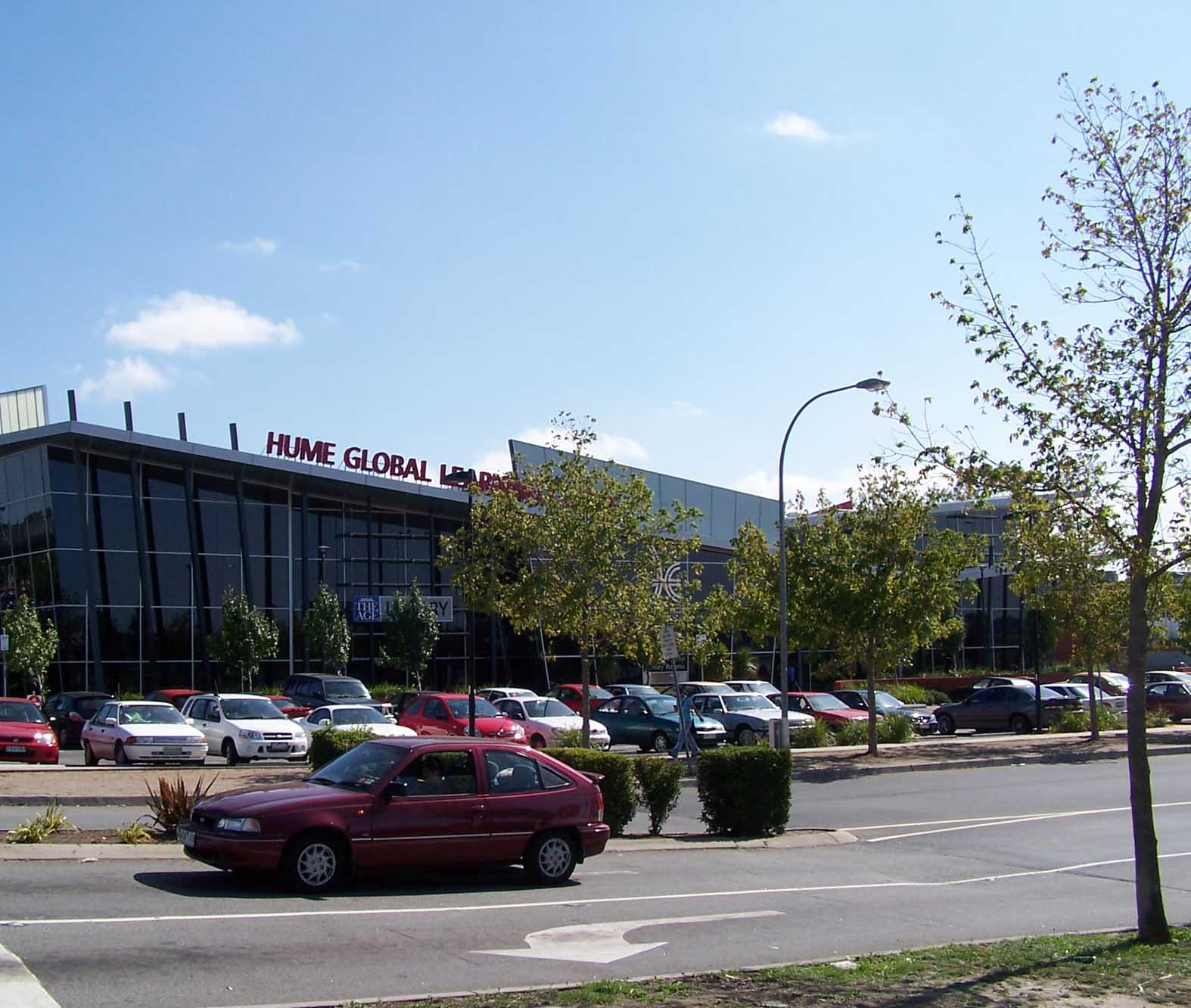
Hume Global Learning Centre

Broadmeadows is a suburb in Melbourne, Victoria, Australia, 15 km (9.3 mi) north of Melbourne's Central Business District and the council seat of the City of Hume local government area. Broadmeadows recorded a population of 12,524 at the 2021 census. It is colloquially known as "Broady".

Broadmeadows is a sub-regional centre within the northern suburbs of Melbourne, and is often used as a reference for the suburbs around it, although this may be due to its former status as a municipality.

== History ==
The Broadmeadows area, home to the Wurundjeri Aboriginal nation prior to European settlement, was settled by pastoralists in the 1840s.

The original Broadmeadows (aka "Old Broady") is now known as Westmeadows, which lies to the west of the present Broadmeadows. The first Broadmeadows township was laid out by a Government survey in 1850. Ardlie Street was its commercial centre with a hotel (the Broadmeadows Hotel, now Westmeadows Tavern), the police station and the shire office (the District Roads Board Building, opened in 1866).

Broadmeadows' centre was altered when the railway line and station were opened two kilometres to the original centre's east in 1872. Shire loyalties clung to the old township until new civic offices were built near the railway station in 1928.

Broadmeadows was the site of the main camp for the reception and training of recruits for the AIF from Victoria early in the First World War. Broadmeadows had been identified as a possible site for military training in 1913, but no facilities had been established. The camp was established in August 1914 at "Mornington Park", a property loaned to the government by Mr R.G. Wilson. Early on, Broadmeadows was predominantly a tented camp and conditions were quite spartan. These facilities, combined with wet weather and poor drainage resulted in a rapid increase in sickness among recruits in autumn 1915. Public concern, fuelled by sensationalist press coverage, resulted in a decision in May 1915 to re-establish the main Victorian training camp at Seymour, approximately 100 kilometres north of Melbourne. Broadmeadows Camp remained in use throughout the war, however, with facilities being progressively improved.

The Housing Commission of Victoria began the building of a 2,226 ha. estate in the Broadmeadows area in 1949. Not until 1975 did it begin building in the vicinity of the old township, which it called Westmeadows Heights. Between 1975 and 1979 it built over 900 houses in the area.

The first Broadmeadows Post Office (near Mickleham Road in today's Westmeadows) opened on 1 January 1855, was renamed Broadmeadows West in 1955, Westmeadows in 1963 before closing in 1973. The second Broadmeadows Post Office was renamed in 1956 from Broadmeadows East (from 1923 the successor to Broadmeadows Railway Station Post Office open since 1902). It closed in 1968, the day Dallas (located centrally and open since 1966) became the third Broadmeadows Post Office. This office reverted to Dallas in 1995, when Broadmeadows Square Post Office, on Pascoe Vale Road north of the station (previously named Meadow Fair from 1965, having replaced Jacana Post Office, to the south, open since 1961) was renamed and became the fourth distinct location of the Broadmeadows Post Office. A later Broadmeadows East office, near Widford Street to the southeast of the station, opened in 1961, was renamed Broadmeadows South in 1969, and also remains open.

The City hosted the road cycling event at the 1956 Summer Olympics.

== Industry ==
Broadmeadows had a strong manufacturing industry. A large Ford factory in Campbellfield closed in 2016.

== Schools ==
- Penola Catholic College: Broadmeadows Campus (9-12)
- Broadmeadows Primary School
- Broadmeadows Special Development School
- Broadmeadows Valley Primary School
- Hume Central Secondary College: Dimboola Road Campus (7-9), Blair Street Campus (7-9) and Town Park Campus (10-12)
- Kangan Institute: Broadmeadows Campus
- Meadow Fair Primary School
- Sirius college (3 campuses of choice)
- St. Dominics Catholic Primary School

== Demographics ==
According to the 2016 census, there were 11,970 people in Broadmeadows.

- 43.5% of people were born in Australia. The next most common countries of birth were Lebanon 8.8%, Turkey 7.9%, and Pakistan 3.7%.
- 28.9% of people spoke only English at home. Other languages spoken at home included Arabic 18.3%, Turkish 8.6%, Urdu 4.2%, Assyrian Neo-Aramaic 3.5% and Vietnamese 2.3%.
- The most common responses for religion were Islam 35.6% and Catholic 18.3%.

== Transport ==
Broadmeadows is serviced by the Melbourne metropolitan railway service as well as the Victorian regional railway services and NSW TrainLink services from Broadmeadows railway station, located between Pascoe Vale Road and Railway Crescent. Broadmeadows is also the terminus for the area's bus routes. Victoria Police Protective Services Officers (PSOs) patrol Broadmeadows railway station from 6pm until the last train service, 7 days a week.

== Sport ==
Hume City FC play soccer in the National Premier Leagues Victoria, with their home ground located at John Ilhan Memorial Reserve, in neighbouring Westmeadows.

Northern Thunder play rugby league in NRL Victoria.

Victoria's Rugby League Centre of Excellence is located at Seabrook Reserve in Broadmeadows. Construction commenced in 2021 and was completed in 2023, at the cost of $16.9 million. The facility serves as the home ground for Northern Thunder as well as the administration base for NRL Victoria and Touch Football Victoria, it serves as a hub for rugby league programs, and a venue for training, camps and state and national level tournaments, and is also set to serve as the home ground of any future Melbourne Storm NRL W team. Features of the facility include a show pitch, three community access competition pitches, a female-friendly pavilion including high-performance training and recovery facilities, and car parking.

== Notable former residents ==
- Kevin Donnelly — Australian educator, author, and commentator
- Bruce Guthrie — former newspaper editor
- John Ilhan — businessman, founder of Crazy John's
- Eddie McGuire — broadcaster and businessman
- Frank McGuire — former journalist, Member for Broadmeadows in the Victorian Legislative Assembly
- Andreja Pejic — Australian model
- Rick Springfield — singer (Jessie's Girl), actor
- Carl Williams — drug trafficker and convicted murderer

== Environmental issues ==
In October 2018, some fatty and smelly liquid were found near Yuroke Creek. After EPA Victoria inspected the area, it was found that a leak was coming from Fresh Cheese Co (Aust) Pty Ltd, a dairy manufacturing company. A crack in concrete caused liquid to leak from the drain into the creek causing damage to the wildlife and vegetation. The company was taken to court by EPA and fined $8,060. The company accepted the legal responsibility of the leak and mentioned the possibility of vandalism due to a burglary happening a week before the leak.

== See also ==
- City of Broadmeadows – Broadmeadows was previously within this former local government area.
- Broadmeadows Central
- Electoral district of Broadmeadows
