= Division of Wills =

Australian federal electoral division

Coordinates: 37.729°S 144.943°E

Wills Australian House of Representatives Division
- Interactive map of electorate boundaries from the 2025 federal election
- Created: 1949
- MP: Peter Khalil
- Party: Labor
- Namesake: William Wills
- Electors: 125,298 (2025)
- Area: 47 km^{2} (18.1 sq mi)
- Demographic: Inner metropolitan
Electorates around Wills:
Calwell	Calwell	Scullin
Maribyrnong	Wills	Cooper
Maribyrnong	Melbourne	Melbourne

The Division of Wills is an Australian electoral division of Victoria. It is currently represented by Peter Khalil of the Australian Labor Party.

The electorate encompasses most of the suburbs in the City of Merri-bek in Melbourne's north, including Brunswick, Brunswick East, Brunswick West, Coburg, Coburg North, Fawkner, Glenroy, Hadfield, Oak Park, Pascoe Vale and Pascoe Vale South, as well as some suburbs in the City of Yarra including Carlton North, Fitzroy North and Princes Hill (as of 2025).

== Geography ==
Since 1984, federal electoral division boundaries in Australia have been determined at redistributions by a redistribution committee appointed by the Australian Electoral Commission. Redistributions occur for the boundaries of divisions in a particular state, and they occur every seven years, or sooner if a state's representation entitlement changes or when divisions of a state are malapportioned.

When the division was created in 1949, it partially replaced the abolished Division of Bourke around the Coburg and Pascoe Vale area. The new division also included Essendon which was previously in the Division of Maribyrnong. In 1955, it lost the Essendon and Pascoe Vale areas, but gained areas to the south at Brunswick West and part of Brunswick. In 1968, it regained the Pascoe Vale areas, gained the entire suburb of Brunswick as well as Brunswick East. In 1977, it lost parts of its southern portions, but gained Oak Park to the north-west and Preston and Thornbury to the east. In 1984, it gained part of Reservoir near Edwardes Lake, and the boundaries at Preston and Thornbury were cut back to the Epping railway line.

In 1989, the division shifted west, losing all areas east of the Merri Creek (Preston, Thornbury and Reservoir) while gaining areas to the west such as Essendon, Essendon Airport, Strathmore and Moonee Ponds. It also gained Fawkner and Hadfield to the north. It was further expanded north in 1994 up to the Western Ring Road to include Glenroy.

In 2003, it lost the Essendon and Moonee Ponds areas, but gained Gowanbrae and the part of Coburg North east of the Merri Creek. It had a minor boundary change in 2010 when it lost a small portion of Strathmore and gained part of Fitzroy North of the Capital City Trail. In 2018, it lost areas west of the Moonee Ponds Creek (which was also the boundary for City of Moreland), Coburg North east of Merri Creek (which it gained in 2003), and the areas in Fitzroy North. It had another minor boundary change in 2021 when it lost a block of Brunswick East. In 2024, it lost areas west of Pascoe Vale Road and CityLink (Glenroy, Oak Park, Pascoe Vale South and Brunswick West), but expanded southwards up to Alexandra Parade to include Princes Hill, Carlton North and Fitzroy North.

Since the creation of the City of Moreland (now City of Merri-bek) in 1994, the division has only included the entirety of the local government area between 2010 and 2018, but contained the majority of it at other times.

As of the 2024 redistribution, Wills is bordered by Pascoe Vale Road and CityLink to the west, Western Ring Road to the north, and Merri Creek to the east. It consists of the majority of the City of Merri-bek, as well as portions of the cities of Melbourne, Moonee Valley, and Yarra.

== History ==
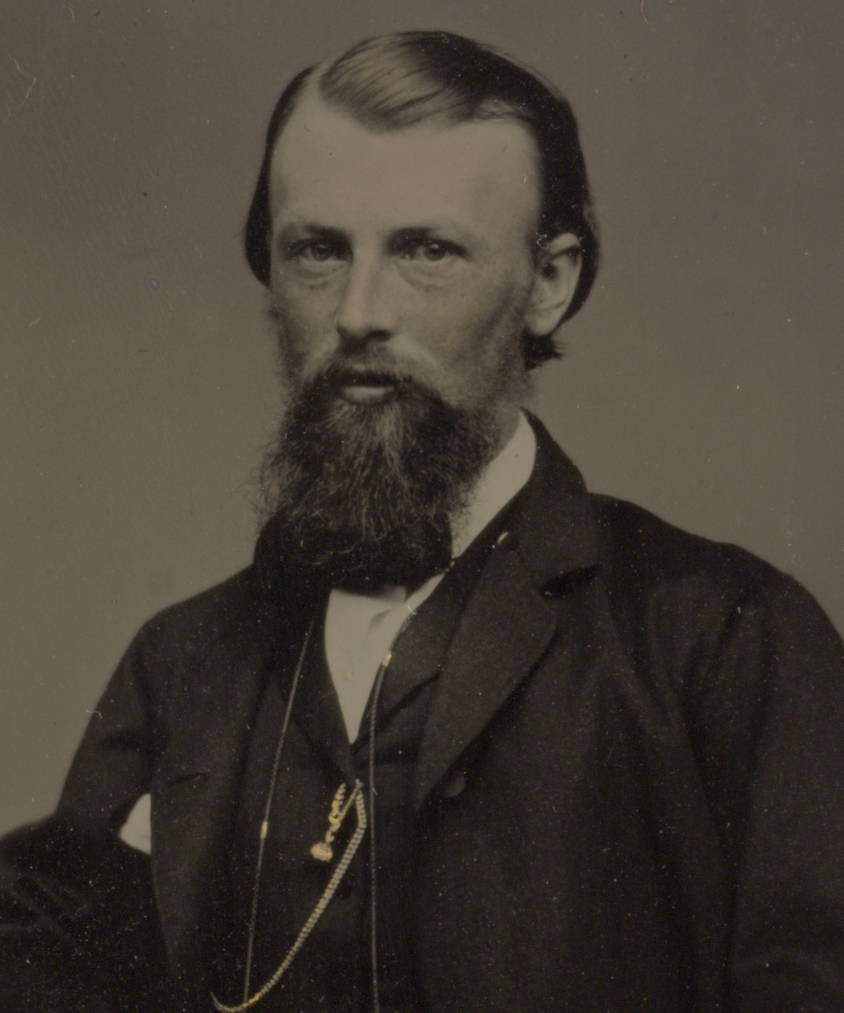
William Wills, the division's namesake

The division was named after William John Wills of Burke and Wills fame. It was created in the 1949 redistribution.

Wills has been in Labor hands for its entire existence except between the 1992 by-election and 1996, when it was held by independent Phil Cleary. Its highest-profile member was Bob Hawke, who was Prime Minister of Australia from 1983 until 1991. The 1992 by-election is remarkable for a number of reasons: It was caused by Bob Hawke's retirement from parliament; it had a record twenty-two candidates standing; it was won by an independent; the results were thrown out as the winner, Phil Cleary, was on unpaid leave from the state education system (the Australian Constitution forbids people employed by the Crown from standing for election). No replacement by-election was held as the court decision which threw out the results was made shortly before a general election was due.

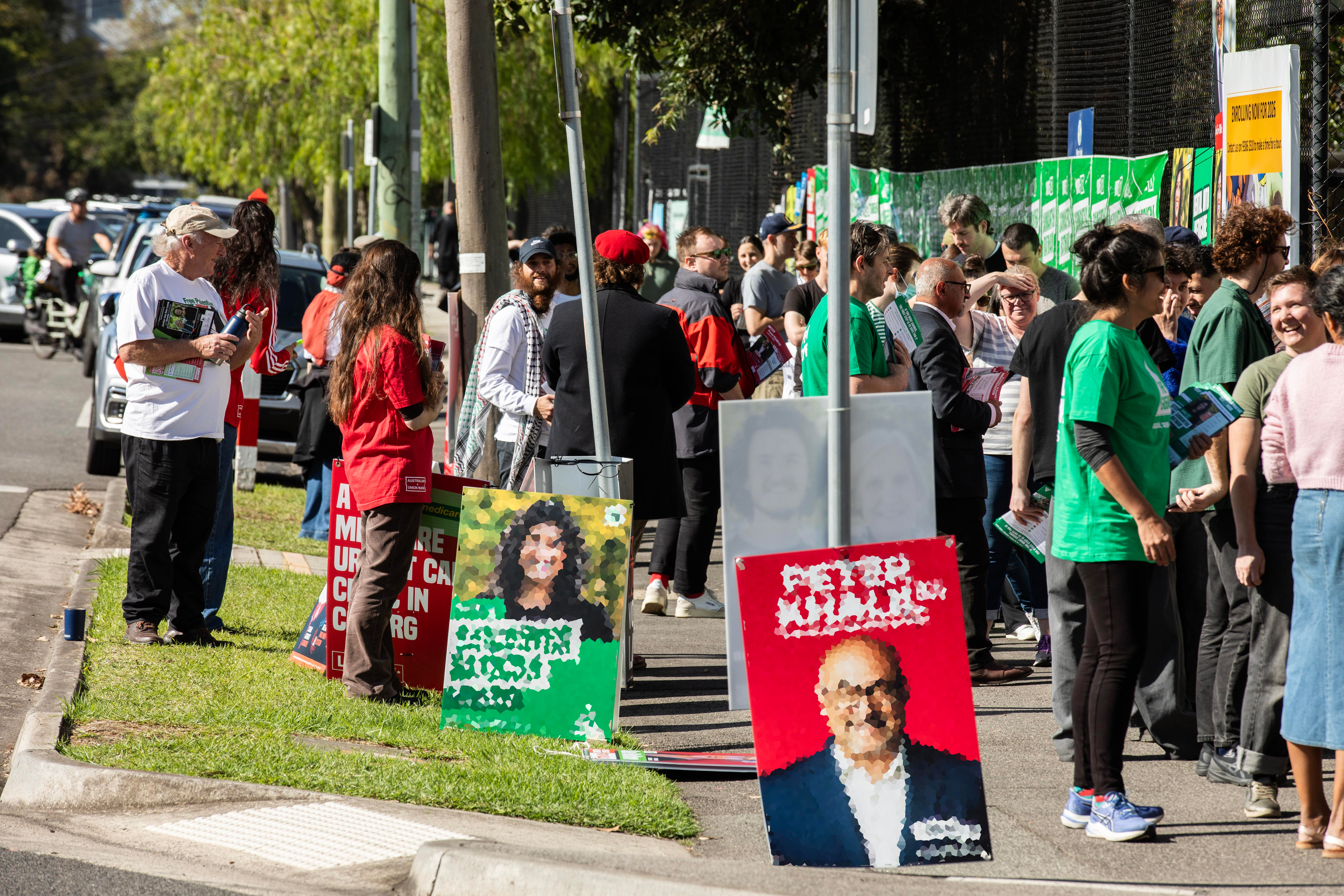
A polling place in Wills at the 2025 federal election, with material for Labor's Peter Khalil and the Greens' Samantha Ratnam

While Wills remains a traditional Labor stronghold, demographic changes and the rise of The Greens has seen Wills, along with the neighbouring seat of Cooper, become Labor-Green contests in recent years. In 2016, Labor's margin versus Greens candidate and City of Merri-bek Mayor Samantha Ratnam dropped below 5 percent after a swing of more than 10 percent to Ratnam, despite the traditional 2PP margin (versus The Liberals) of over 20 percent making it one of the safest Labor seats in the country when considered against the Coalition. Labor's margin over the Greens increased to over 8 percent at the 2019 election, and remained almost unchanged at the 2022 Election.

Two-party-preferred vote in Wills, 1996–2025
Election	1996	1998	2001	2004	2007	2010	2013	2016	2019	2022	2025
Labor	55.77%	70.96%	69.42%	66.90%	72.41%	72.64%	65.20%	54.88%	58.17%	58.57%	51.43%
Independent (Phil Cleary)	44.23%										
Liberal		29.04%	30.56%	33.10%	27.59%	27.36%					
Greens							34.80%	45.12%	41.83%	41.43%	48.57%
Government	L/NP	L/NP	L/NP	L/NP	ALP	ALP	L/NP	L/NP	L/NP	ALP	ALP

== Demographics ==
Wills has undergone inner-city gentrification, particularly in Brunswick, which has led to a surge in support for the Greens in the seat. However, the Labor vote increases the further residents live from the Green heartland of Brunswick.

Wills has relatively large immigrant communities, with populations of second-generation Greek and Italian immigrants. According to the 2016 census, 47.8% of electors had both parents born outside of Australia.

As of 2016, 7.7% of electors spoke Italian, 4.7% Arabic, and 4.5% Greek at home.

== Members ==
Image	Member	Party	Term	Notes
	Bill Bryson (1898–1973)	Labor	10 December 1949 – April 1955	Previously held the Division of Bourke. Lost seat
	Bill Bryson (1898–1973)	Labor (Anti-Communist)	April 1955 – 10 December 1955	Previously held the Division of Bourke. Lost seat
	Gordon Bryant (1914–1991)	Labor	10 December 1955 – 19 September 1980	Served as minister under Whitlam. Retired
	Bob Hawke (1929–2019)	Labor	18 October 1980 – 20 February 1992	Served as Opposition Leader in 1983. Served as Prime Minister from 1983 to 1991. Resigned to retire from politics
	Phil Cleary (1952–)	Independent	11 April 1992 – 25 November 1992	1992 by-election results declared void for holding an office of profit under the Crown, subsequently re-elected in 1993. Lost seat
	Phil Cleary (1952–)	Independent	13 March 1993 – 2 March 1996	1992 by-election results declared void for holding an office of profit under the Crown, subsequently re-elected in 1993. Lost seat
	Kelvin Thomson (1955–)	Labor	2 March 1996 – 9 May 2016	Retired
	Peter Khalil (1973–)	Labor	2 July 2016 – present	Incumbent

== Election results ==
2025 Australian federal election: Wills
Party	Candidate	Votes	%	±%
Labor	Peter Khalil	39,069	35.59	−0.83
Greens	Samantha Ratnam	38,834	35.37	+2.54
Liberal	Jeff Kidney	14,121	12.86	−3.33
Socialist Alliance	Sue Bolton	8,808	8.02	+5.13
One Nation	Bruce Stevens	3,842	3.50	+1.05
Legalise Cannabis	Margee Glover	3,067	2.79	+2.79
Fusion	Owen Miller	1,122	1.02	+1.02
Libertarian	Rachel Versteegen	918	0.84	+0.59
Total formal votes		109,781	95.56	+0.22
Informal votes		5,106	4.44	−0.22
Turnout		114,887	91.72	+5.52
Notional two-party-preferred count
Labor	Peter Khalil	88,770	80.86	+3.77
Liberal	Jeff Kidney	21,011	19.14	−3.77
Two-candidate-preferred result
Labor	Peter Khalil	56,459	51.43	−7.60
Greens	Samantha Ratnam	53,322	48.57	+7.60
Labor hold		Swing	−7.60	
