= Pascoe Vale South =

- Suburb
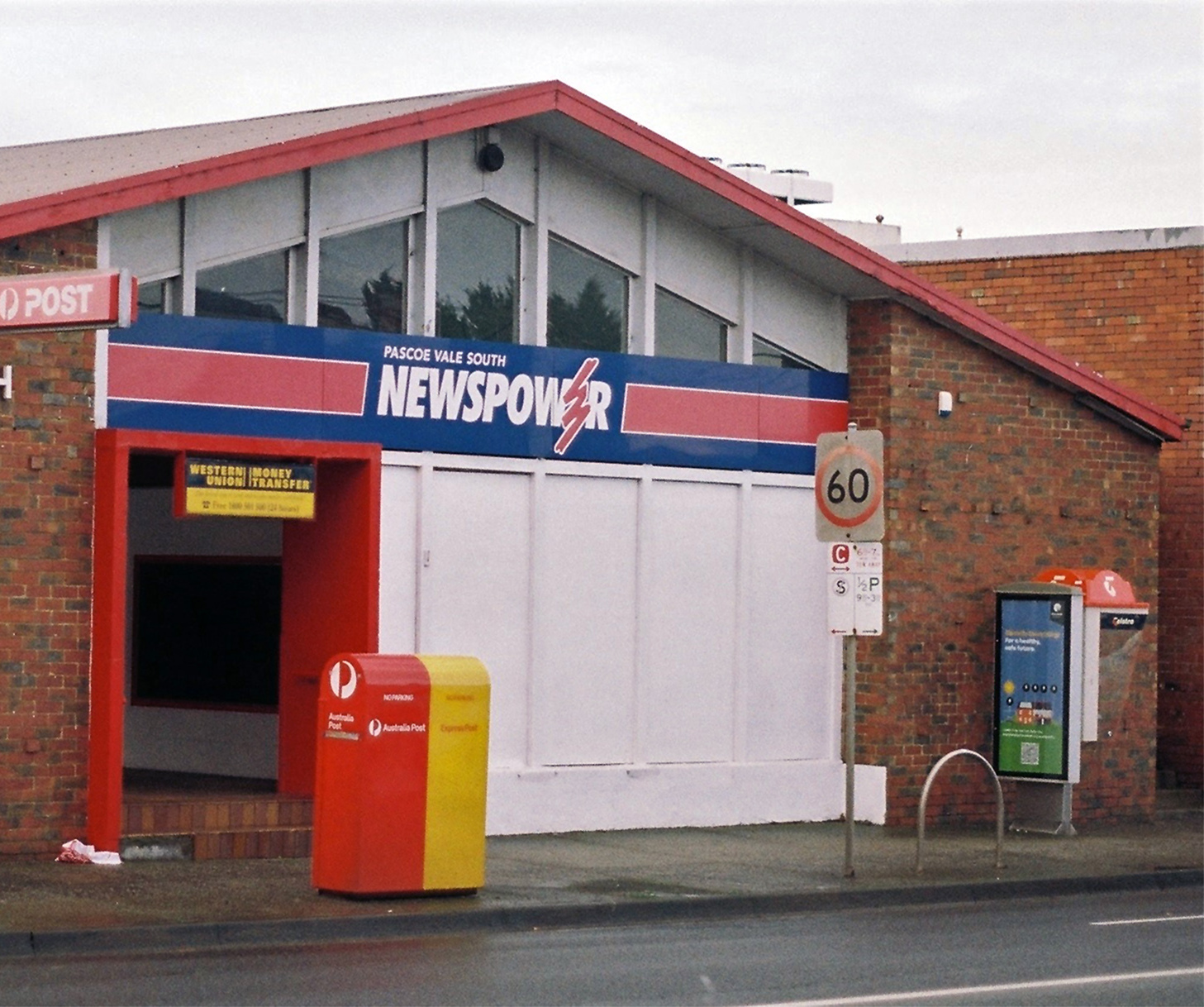
- Post Office at Pascoe Vale South in July 2022

- Interactive map of Pascoe Vale South
- Coordinates: 37.7431°S 144.9377°E
- Country: Australia
- State: Victoria
- City: Melbourne
- LGA: City of Merri-bek
- Location: 8 km (5.0 mi) N of Melbourne

Government
  - State electorates: Brunswick; Pascoe Vale
  - Federal divisions: Wills; Maribyrnong

Area
  - Total: 3 km^{2} (1.2 sq mi)
- Elevation: 34 m (112 ft)

Population
  - Total: 10,006.7 (2021 census)
  - Density: 3,300/km^{2} (8,600/sq mi)
- Postcode: 3044
Suburbs around Pascoe Vale South
Pascoe Vale	Pascoe Vale	Coburg
Essendon; Strathmore	Pascoe Vale South	Coburg
Essendon	Brunswick West	Brunswick West

Pascoe Vale South is an inner suburb in Melbourne, Victoria, Australia, 8 km (5.0 mi) north of Melbourne's Central Business District, located within the City of Merri-bek local government area. Pascoe Vale South recorded a population of 10,534 at the 2021 census.

Pascoe Vale South adjoins Brunswick West to the south, Strathmore and the Moonee Ponds Creek to the west, Coburg to the east, and Pascoe Vale to the north. The suburb also borders the Tullamarine Freeway.

Major features of the suburb include the Bell Street/Melville Road Shopping area.

== History ==
The Pascoe Vale area was part of the original John Pascoe Fawkner property "Pascoeville". In 1841, Dr Farquhar McCrae, a wealthy surgeon, purchased land called 'La Rose' in what is now known as Pascoe Vale South. The house he built in c. 1842 – c. 1843 is now known as Wentworth House, and is the oldest known private dwelling in Victoria standing on its original site, and the fifth oldest building in Victoria.

Significant development of Pascoe Vale South took place after the tramline was extended to Bell Street in 1927, with the post office opening on 1 August 1927.

=== Heritage listings ===
The following places in Pascoe Vale South are listed on the Victorian Heritage Register:

- Lyndhurst Hall, 46 Walhalla Street
- Wentworth House, 22 Le Cateau Street

== Demographics ==
Historical population
Year	Pop.	±%
2001	8,336	—
2006	8,702	+4.4%
2011	9,533	+9.5%
2016	10,069	+5.6%
2021	10,534	+4.6%

As of the 2021 census, 10,534 people lived in Pascoe Vale South.

Pascoe Vale South is primarily a family residential suburb with above average income (the median personal income being $953 in Pascoe Vale South, compared to the national average of $805), above average education (36.1% of people aged 15+ holding a bachelor's degree compared with 26.3% nationwide) and relatively low unemployment (3.6% compared to 5.1% nationwide).

Pascoe Vale South is less culturally diverse than other suburbs of Merri-bek, and even lower than the Melbourne average. In Pascoe Vale South, 74.6% of people were born in Australia. The next most common countries of birth were Italy 4.7%, Greece 2.7%, England 1.5%, India 1.2% and India 1.1%.

The most common responses for religion in Pascoe Vale South were No Religion, so described 34.9%, Catholic 33.0%, Eastern Orthodox 12.0%, Not stated 3.9% and Anglican 3.4%. In Pascoe Vale South, Christianity was the largest religious group reported overall (56.2%) (this figure excludes not stated responses).

In Pascoe Vale South, 68.4% of people only spoke English at home. Other languages spoken at home included Greek 8.4%, Italian 7.9%, Arabic 2%, Mandarin 1.1% and Vietnamese 1.1%.

== Transport ==
=== Bus ===
Eight bus routes service Pascoe Vale South:

- 510 : Essendon station – Ivanhoe station via Brunswick, Northcote and Thornbury. Operated by Kinetic Melbourne.
- 512 : Strathmore station – East Coburg via Pascoe Vale South, Coburg West and Coburg. Operated by Kinetic Melbourne.
- 513 : Eltham station – Glenroy station via Lower Plenty. Operated by Dysons.
- 514 : Eltham station – Glenroy station via Greensborough. Operated by Dysons.
- 527 : Gowrie station – Northland Shopping Centre via Murray Road. Operated by Ventura Bus Lines.
- 561 : Macleod – Pascoe Vale station via La Trobe University. Operated by Dysons.
- SmartBus 903 : Altona station – Mordialloc. Operated by Kinetic Melbourne.
- Night Bus 951 : Brunswick station – Glenroy station via West Coburg (operates Saturday and Sunday mornings only). Operated by Ventura Bus Lines.

=== Cycling ===
For cyclists, the suburb adjoins the Moonee Ponds Creek Trail to the west.

=== Train ===
Pascoe Vale station, on the Craigieburn line, is the nearest station to Pascoe Vale South. Other stations nearby include Batman, Coburg and Moreland, all on the Upfield line.

=== Tram ===
Tram route 58 provides public transport through the suburb, from the Bell Street terminus and along Melville Road, to the city.

== Educational facilities ==
Pascoe Vale South has a government primary school (Pascoe Vale South Primary School) and two catholic schools.

== Neighbourhoods ==
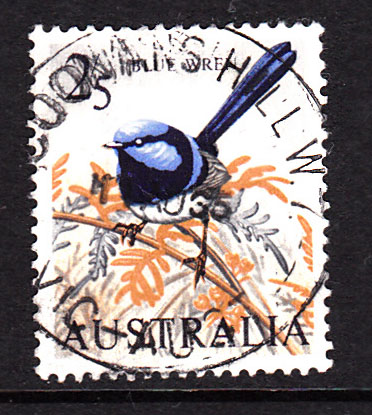
A 1965 postmark of Coonans Hill

The neighbourhood of Coonans Hill is in the south of the suburb (37°45′01″S 144°56′28″E). Its post office (now closed) opened on 21 February 1957.

== See also ==
- City of Coburg – Pascoe Vale South was previously within this former local government area.
