= Kelvin Thomson =

Australian politician

The Honourable Kelvin Thomson
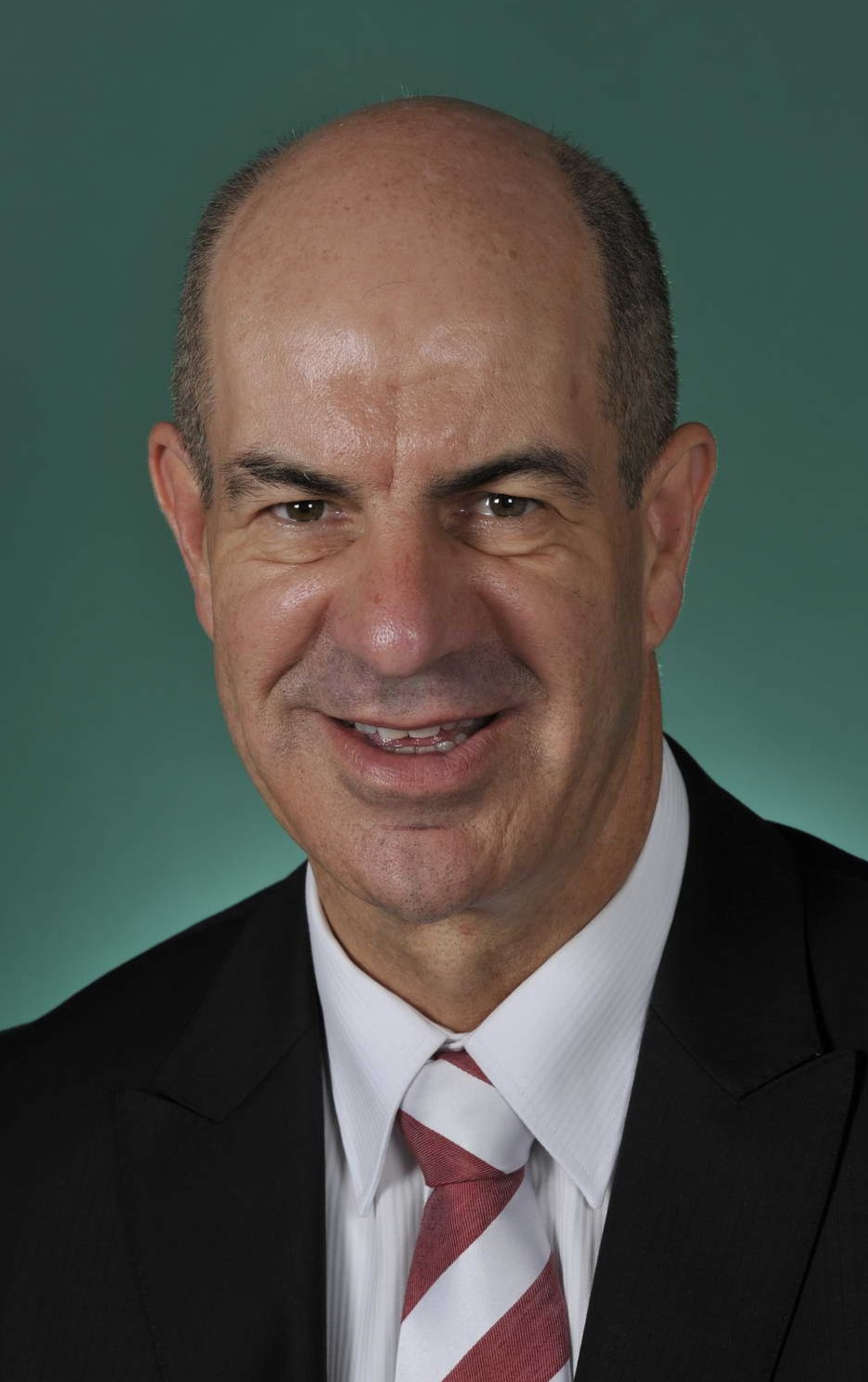

Member of the Australian Parliament for Wills
- In office 2 March 1996 – 9 May 2016
- Preceded by: Phil Cleary
- Succeeded by: Peter Khalil

Member of the Victorian Legislative Assembly for Pascoe Vale
- In office 1 October 1988 – 5 February 1996
- Preceded by: Tom Edmunds
- Succeeded by: Christine Campbell

Personal details
- Born: 1 May 1955 (age 71) Melbourne, Australia
- Party: Labor (1975–2019, 2024-present)
- Other political affiliations: Sustainable Australia (2019–2024)
- Education: University of Melbourne
- Occupation: Lawyer, public servant, and electorate secretary
- Website: www.kelvinthomson.com.au

Kelvin John Thomson (born 1 May 1955) is a former Australian politician. He served as a member of the Australian House of Representatives for the Australian Labor Party, representing the Division of Wills in Victoria, from March 1996 until May 2016. In February 2013, he was appointed Parliamentary Secretary for Trade in the Second Gillard Ministry.

== Politics ==
=== State parliament ===
In October 1988, Thomson was elected to the Victorian Legislative Assembly as the member for Pascoe Vale. He served on the Opposition Shadow Ministry from 1992 to 1994, and in 1994 he was the Manager of Opposition Business.

=== Federal parliament ===
In 1996, Thomson was elected as the member for Wills, a formerly blue‐ribbon Labor seat that had been held by Bob Hawke. However, the seat had become less safe for Labor – in 1992, independent Phil Cleary won a by‐election, and in 1993, although Labor retained government, Cleary defeated the Labor candidate, who received only 41.9% of the primary vote. In the 1996 election, during which Labor’s support declined and Paul Keating's government ended, Thomson was selected as the Labor candidate and proved to be a strong campaigner. He won the seat, receiving 50.0% of the primary vote. In the 2007 election, which Labor won, Thomson recorded a 5.5-point swing on the two-party-preferred vote and secured 56.9% of the primary vote. In the 2010 election – which resulted in near defeat for Labor – Thomson, like other incumbent Labor MPs, lost ground on the primary vote (51.81%); however, he achieved a further slight positive swing of 0.24% on the two-party-preferred vote.

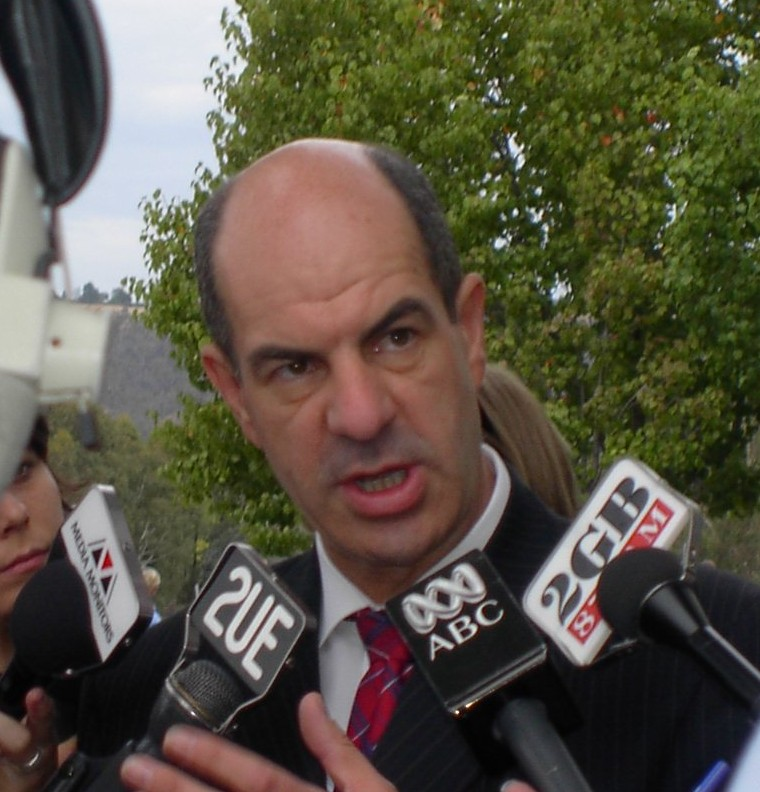
Thomson in 2005.

In August 1997, Thomson joined the Opposition Shadow Ministry. From 2003 to 2004, he served as Shadow Minister for the Environment and Heritage, and from 2004 to 2005 he was Shadow Minister for Regional Development and Roads, Housing and Urban Development. In June 2005, he was appointed Shadow Minister for Public Accountability and Shadow Minister for Human Services. Following Kevin Rudd's election as party leader in December 2006, Thomson was appointed Shadow Attorney-General.

On 9 March 2007, Kevin Rudd informed the media that his office had received an anonymous tip-off that, in 2000, Thomson had provided Melbourne gangland figure Tony Mokbel with a personal reference. The reference stated that he “understood” Mokbel had been married for the preceding eight years and that he was “a responsible, caring husband and father”. It was later revealed that, up until 2000, there had been only one media mention of Mokbel – a positive Herald Sun article on the contributions made by Mokbel’s businesses to the local economy in Moreland, within and near Thomson’s electorate of Wills – and that the National Australia Bank had regarded Mokbel as a legitimate property developer worth approximately $15 million, investing in him until his arrest in August 2001. Thomson resigned from Labor’s frontbench after the reference became public, and he later released the text of the letter, noting that he did not know Mokbel and that “the reference, as you will be able to see, was more of a pro-forma character (reference)”.

Coverage by The Sydney Morning Herald emphasised that Kevin Rudd was under pressure over “allegations surrounding his past meetings with disgraced former Western Australian premier Brian Burke" and noted that Thomson “had no choice but to resign, especially since [Prime Minister] John Howard raised the bar a week ago by sacking Ian Campbell for doing nothing more than the meeting, in his then-capacity as heritage minister, a delegation which included Burke.” The article suggested that the type of reference provided by Thomson was similar to the thousands of pro forma references supplied by MPs to their constituents, and questioned whether Thomson “would have suffered the same fate” had he not been appointed Shadow Attorney-General in the seven years following the reference. It further commented: “Thomson’s relegation to the backbench will be a setback for Labor. Ever since December, when Rudd promoted him to shadow attorney-general, he has dealt the Government more grief over David Hicks than Labor did collectively over the previous five years. Of the big changes to Labor’s frontbench under Rudd, Thomson was the standout surprise performer.” Thomson was not subsequently re-appointed to the Labor cabinet; he later chaired the Parliament’s Treaties Committee and frequently served as acting Speaker.

Since 2009, Thomson’s speeches and media releases have frequently addressed issues related to Australian and global population growth. In August 2009, following a terrorist scare, he attracted controversy with comments linking high immigration to allegedly poor screening of immigrants for terrorism. In September 2009, after the release of a report forecasting that Australia’s population would reach 35 million by 2049, Thomson reiterated his call to reduce immigration levels. He warned that Australia was “sleepwalking into an environmental disaster” and predicted that such a population would exceed its resources of “food, water, energy and land”.

Thomson has since been an advocate for sustainable population levels in Australia. In November 2009, he proposed a 14 Point Plan for Population Reform, which aimed to stabilise Australia’s population at 26 million by reducing skilled immigration and limiting net overseas migration to 70,000 per annum. The plan also called for abolishing the Baby Bonus while increasing the refugee intake from 13,750 to 20,000 per annum (the Labor government later announced an increase to 20,000 in 2012).

Thomson describes himself as a keen environmentalist and naturalist; as an MP, he has been strongly anti-nuclear, supportive of sustainable population policies, and in favour of action on climate change. In 2011 and 2012, he was prominent in leading opposition within the Australian Federal Parliament to the export of live cattle and sheep for meat. In October 2012, his call for a ban on political donations by developers received backing from The Age. In 2012, he voted against the Marriage Equality Amendment Bill. In 2017, he was awarded the Alan Missen Award for Integrity in Serving Parliament by the Accountability Roundtable.

In 2012, Emeritus Professor Ian Lowe, president of the Australian Conservation Foundation, examined Labor’s views on population and the environment in his book Bigger or Better? Lowe found that both the stated and de facto population policies of Labor – like those of the Liberal Party – were confused and inconsistent. He argued that these policies were distorted by a pro-growth ideology that conflicted with the evidence, and by a failure to understand the infrastructure costs associated with rapid population growth. By contrast, Lowe commended the arguments presented in four separate papers by Thomson, noting that collectively they demonstrated that “Thomson is not a one-trick pony obsessed with population to the exclusion of other important issues, but a politician who is thinking deeply about our security and ways to ensure a better future”. Lowe also expressed surprise that so much attention had been given to “Thomson’s anodyne reference” for Mokbel, given that Thomson had done “what most MPs do quite routinely, writing a reference for a constituent”.

During his time in Parliament, Thomson spoke out against criminal activities in the gambling industry.

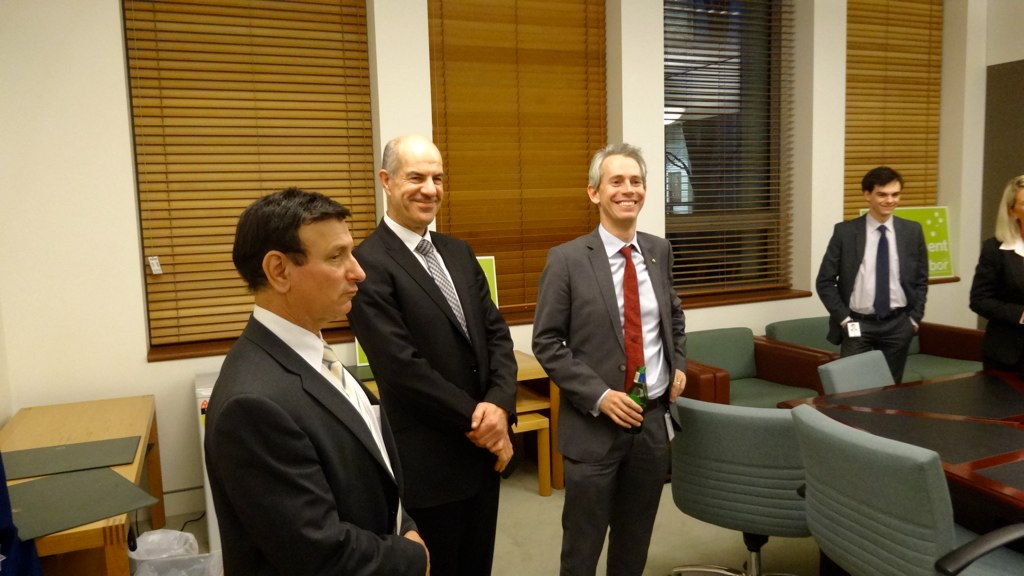
Thomson (centre) with Tony Zappia (left) and Andrew Giles (right) in Parliament house in 2014

=== Political theorist ===
Since 2008, Thomson has emerged as a political theorist whose speeches and articles question some of the Labor Party’s current directions and call for reforms.

His analysis begins by noting the exceptional speed of Australia’s population growth since 2000. He cites demographer Graeme Hugo, who has described it as more than three times the average annual increase observed in industrialised countries. In a series of papers and speeches collected on his website, Thomson argues that such rapid growth imposes high costs on government budgets, natural and urban environments, and on citizens’ finances and lifestyles. He concedes that the Labor Party is unlikely to change its pro-growth stance or embrace “population reform” in the short term, but contends that no alternative exists, as the current rate of population growth is impoverishing state governments and fuelling widespread voter discontent.

Answering those who believe that better planning or increased funding could resolve these issues, Thomson suggests that they fail to appreciate the crippling impact of the infrastructure costs imposed by population growth. On this point, he cites the work of US economist Lester Thurow and University of Queensland agricultural economist Jane N. O’Sullivan. O’Sullivan has argued that these costs—amounting to roughly A$200,000 of infrastructure per additional Australian—dwarf the purported economic benefits. Thomson believes this largely explains why Anna Bligh's seemingly competent Queensland state government suffered the worst defeat of a sitting government in Queensland history, being forced to alienate voters by selling off public assets during an economic boom while still failing to meet the population’s infrastructure demands. He suggests that, “Instead of talking about population size, we should examine the economic impacts of … population growth rate.”

In a speech in Parliament in March 2012, Thomson recommended to his colleagues a paper by O’Sullivan published in Economic Affairs as essential reading “for anyone who seriously wants to understand … why governments of all persuasions struggle to meet people’s needs and expectations.” He argued that, because about 2% of existing infrastructure requires renewal each year—a cost that governments struggle to meet—even a 1% annual increase in population can impose an almost unmanageable rise of up to 50% in infrastructure costs:

A society with a stable population needs to replace two per cent of all infrastructure annually. But if a population is growing at one per cent per annum, for example ...this increases the burden of infrastructure creation by some 50 per cent. ...One per cent more GDP or tax cannot pay for 25 to 50 per cent more public infrastructure.

Thomson had previously generalised this analysis in his August 2011 paper The Witches’ Hats Theory of Government: How Increasing Population is Making the Task of Government Harder. In that work, he suggested that one reason many politicians worldwide have promoted population growth is that they fail to recognise how it may ultimately curtail their own political longevity. He assembled evidence indicating an inverse statistical relationship between population growth and the longevity of governments worldwide.

=== Retirement from politics ===
On 10 November 2015, Thomson announced that he would retire from politics at the 2016 federal election. He held the seat of Wills from 1996 until 2016 and was succeeded by Peter Khalil. In December 2016, he announced that he was joining the Alliance for Gambling Reform as a campaign manager. In 2019 Kelvin Thomson resigned from the Labor Party. He rejoined it in 2024, and remains a Life Member. In 2025 he took on a part time role as Litter Action Officer for the Moonee Ponds Creek Chain of Ponds Collaboration, spearheading a campaign to clean up the Moonee Ponds Creek.

== Publications ==
- Labor Essays 1983 - Policies and Programs for the Labor Government, Drummond, Richmond Victoria, 1983. (co-editor)
- “The Role of Fiduciary Duty in Safeguarding the Future”, in Fiduciary Duty and the Atmospheric Trust, eds. Ken Coghill, Charles Sampford and Tim Smith, 2012.
- "Why can’t we win on population?”, in Sustainable Futures - Linking population, resources and the environment, eds. Jennie Goldie and Katharine Betts, 2014.
- "The decline of wildlife in Australia in Global Viewpoints - Biodiversity and Conservation, ed. Lisa Idzikowski, 2020.

Parliament of Australia
Preceded by Phil Cleary	Member for Wills; 1996–2016	Succeeded by Peter Khalil
Political offices
Preceded by Justine Elliot	Parliamentary Secretary for Trade; 2013	Position abolished
Victorian Legislative Assembly
Preceded by Tom Edmunds	Member for Pascoe Vale; 1988–1996	Succeeded by Christine Campbell
