= Pascoe Vale =

- Suburb
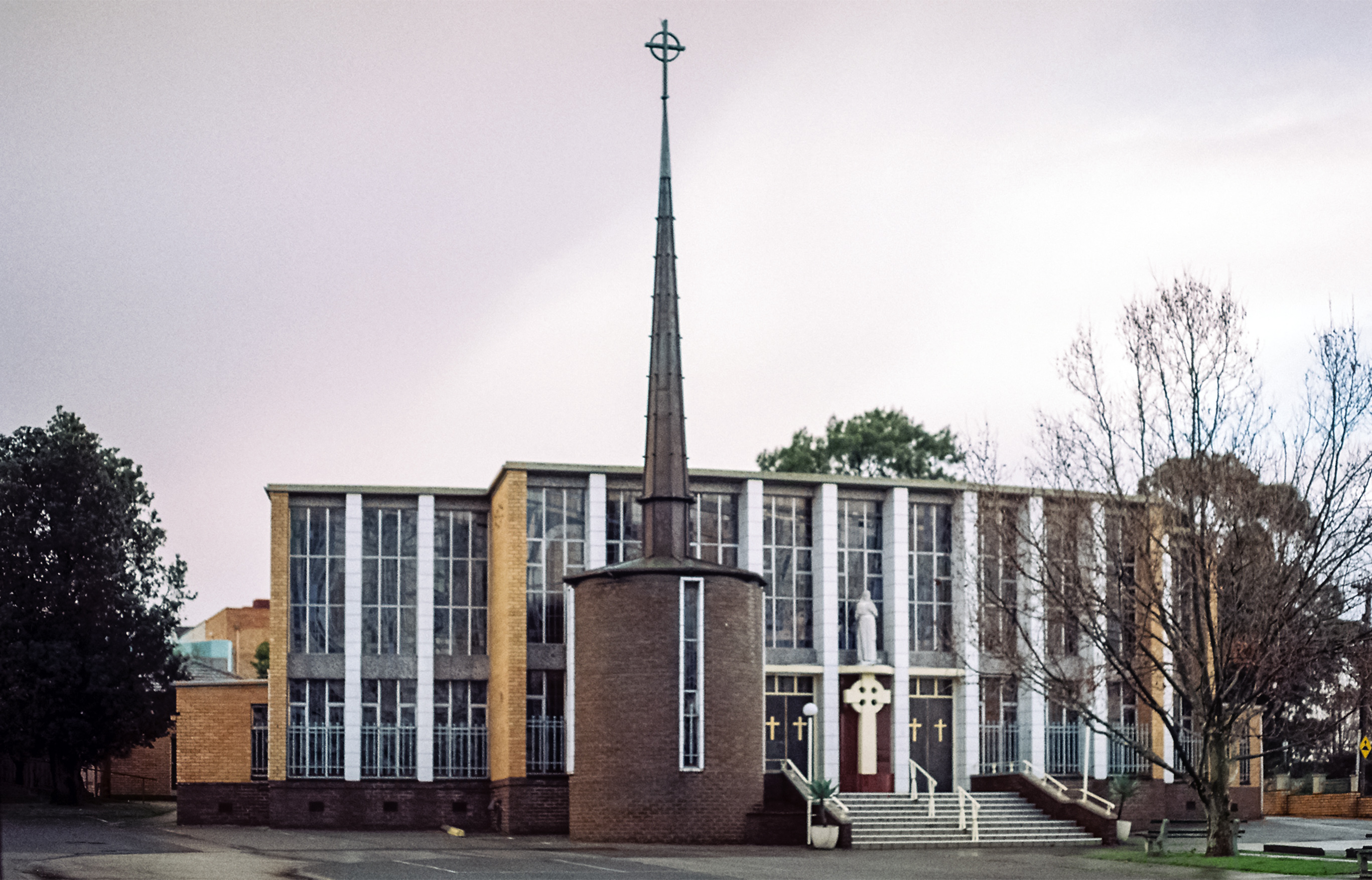
- St Oliver Plunkett Catholic Church in Pascoe Vale

- Interactive map of Pascoe Vale
- Coordinates: 37.727°S 144.942°E
- Country: Australia
- State: Victoria
- City: Melbourne
- LGA: City of Merri-bek
- Location: 9 km (5.6 mi) N of Melbourne

Government
  - State electorate: Pascoe Vale
  - Federal divisions: Wills; Maribyrnong

Area
  - Total: 4.9 km^{2} (1.9 sq mi)
- Elevation: 45 m (148 ft)

Population
  - Total: 18,171 (2021 census)
  - Density: 3,710/km^{2} (9,600/sq mi)
- Postcode: 3044
Suburbs around Pascoe Vale
Glenroy; Oak Park	Hadfield	Hadfield
Oak Park; Strathmore	Pascoe Vale	Coburg North
Strathmore	Pascoe Vale South	Coburg

Pascoe Vale is a suburb in Melbourne, Victoria, Australia, 9 km (5.6 mi) north of Melbourne's central business district, located within the City of Merri-bek local government area. Pascoe Vale recorded a population of 18,171 at the 2021 census.

== History ==
Pascoe Vale was named after John Fawkner's property "Pascoeville", which was originally a holding of 709 acres (2.87 km^{2}). The property, established in 1839, was bounded by the Moonee Ponds Creek to the west, Gaffney Street to the south, Northumberland Road to the east and Rhodes Parade to the north. John Pascoe Fawkner built a timber house overlooking the creek, in the Marie Street area of Oak Park.

Pascoe Vale Post Office opened on 25 September 1911. A Pascoe Vale West Post Office opened in 1927 and closed in 1976.

Pascoe Vale Road in the mid-19th century was originally called Sydney Road. For much of the 19th century, where a fast food chicken outlet in Pascoe Vale Road now exists, was once a Cobb & Co waystation. Ironically, during much of the 20th century, the same location was a chicken farm.

In 1841, Dr Farquhar McCrae, a wealthy surgeon, bought land in Pascoe Vale South, where he built his house in 1842–1843. This house is now known as Wentworth House, and is the oldest known private dwelling in Victoria still standing on its original site, and the fifth oldest building in Victoria.

Several locally significant historic buildings and precincts exist within the suburb, including the Turner Street Precinct and Gavin Park and the Westbreen Creek Precinct, which contain collections of substantially intact inter-War and post-war houses constructed in the 19th century.

== Demographics ==
According to data from the 2021 census, Pascoe Vale recorded a population of 18,171 people. This is slightly more than the recorded number of residents in the 2001 Census Data, where 13,210 people were recorded as living in Pascoe Vale. The suburb has historically been less culturally diverse compared to other suburbs in Merri-bek. A lower proportion of Pascoe Vale residents were born overseas and Pascoe Vale has the highest proportion of Australian-born citizens. 62.3% of people living in Pascoe Vale speak English only at home, which is lower than the metropolitan average, but higher than the average in Merri-bek. Other languages spoken at home included Italian 6.4%, Arabic 3.7%, Greek 3.7%, Mandarin 2.0%, and Turkish 1.9%.

According to the 2021 census, 65.1% of people in Pascoe Vale were born in Australia. Other countries of birth included Italy, which accounted for 3.9% of the population, followed by India 2.9%, England 1.8%, New Zealand 1.5%, and Greece 1.3%.

The most common responses for religion in Pascoe Vale were Catholic 34.1%, no religion, so described 25.4%, not stated 9.6%, Islam 7.7%, and Eastern Orthodox 6.0%. In Pascoe Vale, Christianity was the largest religious group reported overall (56.7%) (this figure excludes not stated responses).

== Transport ==
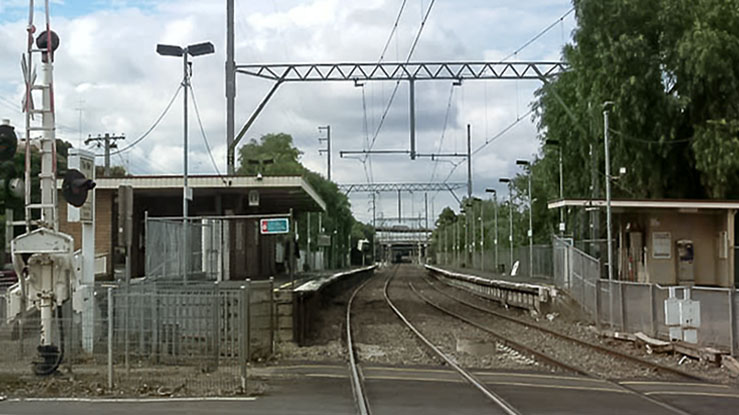
Pascoe Vale railway station

Public transport services within Pascoe Vale include access to heavy rail, light rail and buses.

=== Bus ===
Six bus routes service Pascoe Vale:

- 513 : Eltham station – Glenroy station via Lower Plenty. Operated by Dysons.
- 514 : Eltham station – Glenroy station via Greensborough. Operated by Dysons.
- 527 : Gowrie station – Northland Shopping Centre via Murray Road. Operated by Ventura Bus Lines.
- 542 : Roxburgh Park station – Pascoe Vale station via Meadow Heights, Broadmeadows and Glenroy. Operated by Dysons.
- 561 : Macleod – Pascoe Vale station via La Trobe University. Operated by Dysons.
- Night Bus 951 : Brunswick station – Glenroy station via West Coburg (operates Saturday and Sunday mornings only). Operated by Ventura Bus Lines.

=== Cycling ===
Arterial cycling access is provided via the Moonee Ponds Creek Trail, Sussex Street, and Gaffney Street. In 2020, VicRoads announced a project to provide safer cycling infrastructure in Pascoe Vale, including upgrades to bicycle lanes and six intersections between Boundary Road and O'Hea Street.

=== Train ===
Pascoe Vale railway station, which is located on the Craigieburn line. This provides northbound access to major activity centres in Broadmeadows and Craigieburn, and southbound access to major activity centres in Essendon, North Melbourne (including rail interchange options along the Upfield, Werribee and Williamstown lines) and the Melbourne CBD.

=== Tram ===
Light rail service is provided by tram route 58, which terminates at Bell Street, Pascoe Vale South. This provides access to Brunswick West, Melbourne CBD and terminates in Toorak.

== Politics ==
Pascoe Vale is located in the federal electorate of Wills, and is historically a safe Australian Labor Party seat. The electorate has been held by Peter Khalil since 2016.

The seat was held between 1980 and 1992 by former Prime Minister, Bob Hawke. From 1992 to 1996, the seat was held by independent Phil Cleary, the only non-Labor candidate to hold the electorate.

The state electorate of Pascoe Vale is currently held by the ALP's Anthony Cianflone, who won the seat at the 2022 Victorian state election. From 2014 to 2022, the seat was held by the ALP's Lizzie Blandthorn, who is the goddaughter of her predecessor and former Community Services minister Christine Campbell.

== Parks and gardens ==
Pascoe Vale is known for its many parks and gardens, including Cole Reserve, Austin Reserve, Kelvin Thomson Reserve and Gavin Park.

The Moonee Ponds Creek is the major stormwater canal in the area and flows through several of its parks and gardens.

Managed by the City of Merri-bek, the Pascoe Vale Swimming Pool, on Prospect Street, is a popular venue during summer.

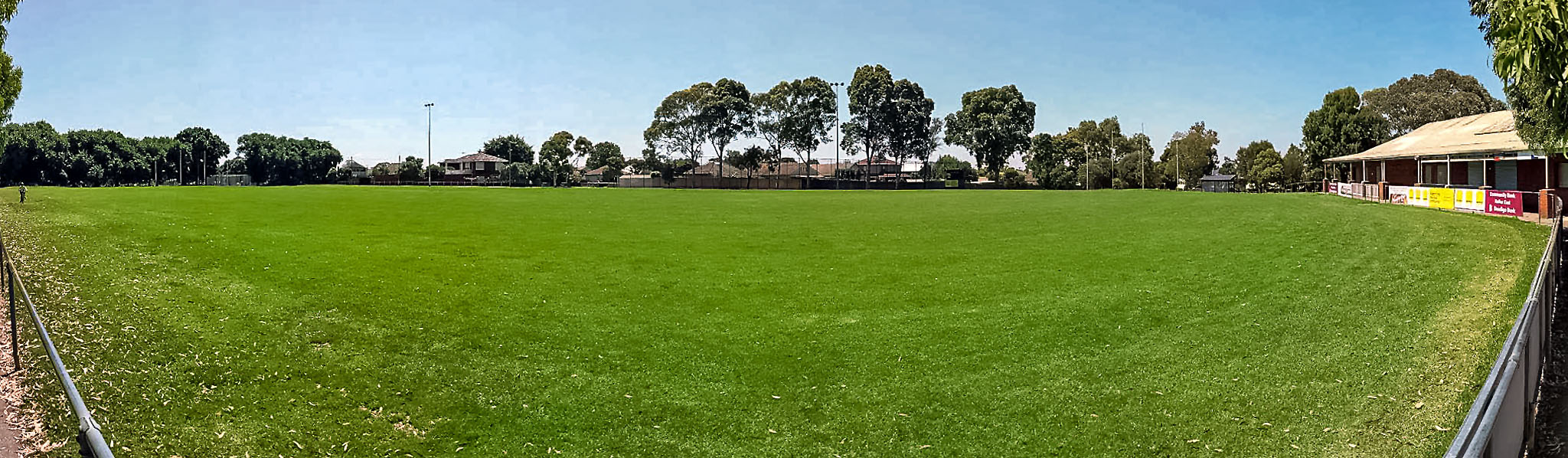
Cole Park, Pascoe Vale, December 2022

== Cuisine ==
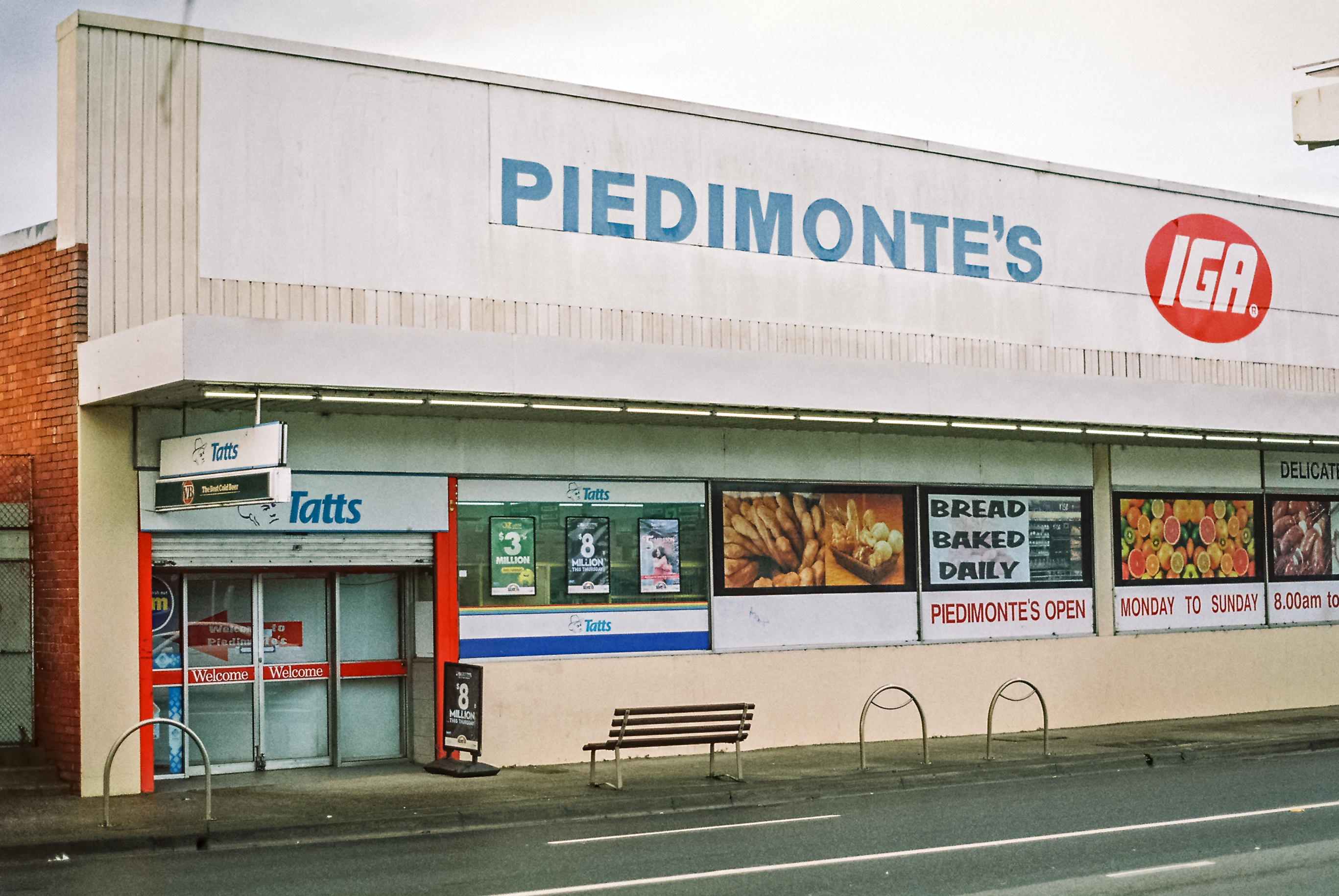
IGA store at Pascoe Vale

Pascoe Vale accommodates several cafés, restaurants, bakeries and takeaway shops, which are largely located in neighbourhood centres at Pascoe Vale railway station, along Gaffney Street, Kent Road, Cumberland Road, Bell Street and Sussex Street.

== Educational facilities ==
- Pascoe Vale Girls' College
- Westbreen Primary School
- Pascoe Vale Primary School
- Pascoe Vale North Primary School
- St. Oliver Plunkett Primary School
- Pascoe Vale South Primary School
- St Francis de Sales (Pascoe Vale Road)

== Sporting clubs ==
- Pascoe Vale Soccer Club plays in the National Premier League Victoria, which is the second tier in Australia.
- Pascoe Vale Football Club, an Australian Rules football team, competes in the Essendon District Football League.
- Pascoe Vale Cricket Club has been one of the more successful and enduring cricket clubs in the region, having won a number of junior and senior premierships since 1936. Its two A-Grade premierships of 1990/91 and 1991/92 were teams said to have been able to compete on a District Cricket level, such was the talent and ability in the teams, which contained district cricketers of the like of Neil Howard, Bill McGowan and Gus Gilmour.
- Coburg Districts Football Club
- St Andrews Cricket Club
- Park Panthers Netball Club
- Pascoe Vale Ice Fighters

== See also ==
- City of Broadmeadows – Parts of Pascoe Vale were previously within this former local government area.
- City of Coburg – Parts of Pascoe Vale were previously within this former local government area.
