= Oak Park, Victoria =

Oak Park
- Suburb
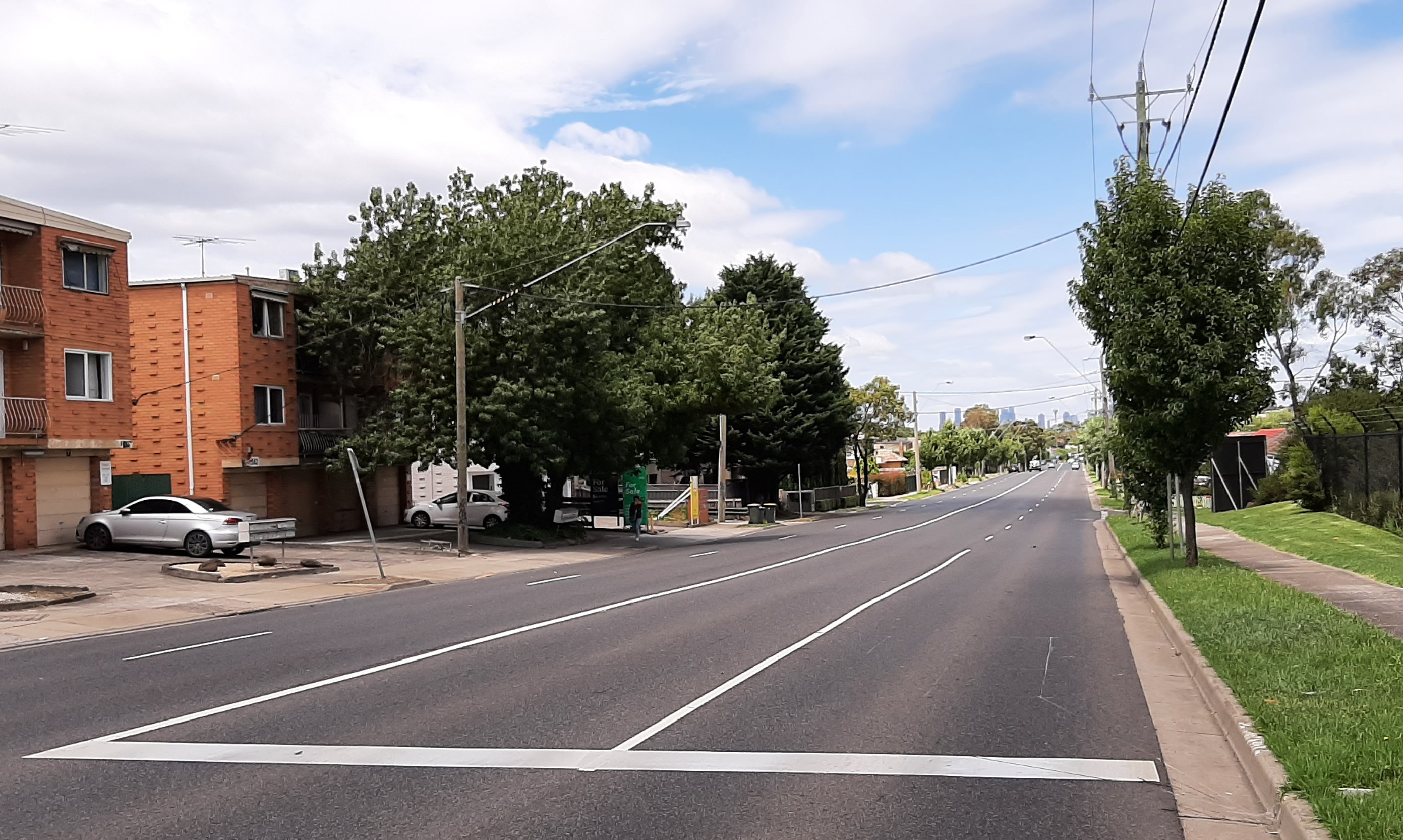
- Pascoe Vale Road, Oak Park

- Interactive map of Oak Park
- Coordinates: 37.718°S 144.919°E
- Country: Australia
- State: Victoria
- City: Melbourne
- LGA: City of Merri-bek
- Location: 11 km (6.8 mi) N of Melbourne

Government
  - State electorate: Pascoe Vale
  - Federal divisions: Wills; Maribyrnong

Area
  - Total: 1.9 km^{2} (0.73 sq mi)
- Elevation: 75 m (246 ft)

Population
  - Total: 6,714 (2021 census)
  - Density: 3,530/km^{2} (9,150/sq mi)
- Postcode: 3046
Suburbs around Oak Park
Glenroy; Strathmore Heights	Glenroy	Glenroy
Strathmore Heights	Oak Park	Pascoe Vale
Strathmore	Strathmore	Pascoe Vale

Oak Park is a suburb in Melbourne, Victoria, Australia, 11 km (6.8 mi) north of Melbourne's Central Business District, located within the City of Merri-bek local government area. Oak Park recorded a population of 6,714 at the 2021 census.

Oak Park is bounded by New Road, Victoria Street, Kiama Street and Charlotte Street in the north, Watt Avenue and Pascoe Vale Road in the east, Moonee Ponds Creek in the west and Main Street in the south.

== History ==
Oak Park was formed from part of the John Pascoe Fawkner estate. The name of the area derived from the name chosen by the purchasers of the Fawkner Estate. Oak Park was relatively slowly developed, as the area did not have a railway station until housing development had commenced in the 1950s. Through the 1950s and 1960s, development of the area proceeded quickly, with the post office opening on 2 April 1957.

== Today ==
Major features of the area include McDonald's on Pascoe Vale Road, the Winifred Street Shopping Centre, two reserves along Moonee Ponds Creek including the Oak Park Sports Centre, and the Moonee Ponds Creek Trail for cyclists. The Oak Park Sports Centre is home to the St. Francis Football Club, a member of the Essendon District Football League as well as Therry Penola Football Club, a member of the Victorian Amateur Football Association.

== Demographics ==
According to data from the 2016 census:

- The most common ancestries in Oak Park were English 18.2%, Australian 16.7%, Italian 9.4%, Irish 7.8% and Scottish 5.3%.
- In Oak Park, 62.9% of people were born in Australia. The most common countries of birth were India 4.3%, Italy 2.5%, China (excludes SARs and Taiwan) 2.5%, Turkey 1.6% and Nepal 1.5%.
- The most common responses for religion in Oak Park were Catholic 30.7%, No Religion, so described 27.0%, Not stated 8.8%, Anglican 6.1% and Islam 5.4%. In Oak Park, Christianity was the largest religious group reported overall (54.8%) (this figure excludes not stated responses).
- In Oak Park, 60.9% of people only spoke English at home. Other languages spoken at home included Italian 4.5%, Mandarin 2.9%, Turkish 2.7%, Arabic 2.1% and Greek 1.9%.

== Transport ==
=== Bus ===
Three bus routes service Oak Park:

- 513 : Eltham station – Glenroy station via Lower Plenty. Operated by Dysons.
- 514 : Eltham station – Glenroy station via Greensborough. Operated by Dysons.
- 542 : Roxburgh Park station – Pascoe Vale station via Meadow Heights, Broadmeadows and Glenroy. Operated by Dysons.

=== Train ===
One railway station services Oak Park: Oak Park, on the Craigieburn line. The station opened in August 1956.

== Sport ==
Oak Park Football Club, an Australian Rules football team, competes in the Essendon District Football League. Therry Penola Football Club competes in the Victorian Amateur Football Association. St. Francis Junior Football Club competes in the Essendon District Football League.

Oak Park is also served by the St. Francis de Sales Cricket Club, based at Rayner Reserve in Forbes Grove, Oak Park. St Francis has 13 teams, six senior in the MMVCA and seven junior in the NWCA, and has been the winner of the Club Championship five of the past seven years. Players of all abilities, race and sex are welcome.

Although the Oak Park Sports and Aquatic Centre is named after the suburb, the facility is actually located in the adjacent suburb of Pascoe Vale.

== Ghost Sightings ==
Oak Park is a popular suburban hotspot for local ghost tours. Local ghost hunters have said the ghost of Old Man Oak roams Winifred Street. Old Oak was a myth that developed during the Victorian Goldrush after James Oak drowned in the Moonee Ponds Creek whilst panning for gold. Many locals and tourists walk the Moonee Ponds Creek Trail in search of Old Man Oak and his gold.

== Notable residents ==
- Danny Carreras – Celebrity Chef
- Ráv Thomas – Musician

== See also ==
- City of Broadmeadows – Oak Park was previously within this former local government area.
