= Lyndhurst Hall, Pascoe Vale South =

Heritage-listed house in Melbourne, Victoria, Australia

Lyndhurst Hall
- Location within Melbourne
- Interactive map of the Lyndhurst Hall area

General information
- Status: Completed
- Type: Prefabricated house
- Location: 42–46 Walhalla Street, Pascoe Vale South, Melbourne, Victoria, Australia
- Coordinates: 37°44′59″S 144°56′36″E
- Completed: c. 1870; 156 years ago (in current location)
- Client: Edward de Carle (1850s); Allan Strange (c. 1870)

Technical details
- Structural system: Tongue and groove
- Material: Timber
- Size: 10 rooms
- Floor count: 2

Victorian Heritage Register
- Official name: Lyndhurst Hall
- Type: Registered place
- Criteria: A4, B2
- Designated: 25 March 1993
- Reference no.: H0964
- Heritage overlay no.: HO189

Lyndhurst Hall is a heritage-listed prefabricated house located at 42–46 Walhalla Street, Pascoe Vale South, an inner northern suburb of Melbourne, in Victoria, Australia.

Imported in the 1850s and erected on its current location in c. 1870, the house was added to the Victorian Heritage Register on 25 March 1993 in recognition of its architectural, historical and social significance; and was also added to a non-statutory list by the Victorian branch of the National Trust on 30 November 1978.

== History ==
Lyndhurst Hall was reputedly imported in the 1850s by Edward de Carle, an auctioneer and merchant, and the prefabricated house was erected on the corner of Albion and Nicholson Streets, Brunswick. In December 1867, the property was listed for rent, set on four hectares (nine acres), with a two-storey house of ten rooms, stables, coach house, orchard, and yards.

The building was subsequently purchased by Allan (Note: The Victorian Heritage Register spells his name as "Alan". However, most newspaper publications spell his name as "Allan"; with one spelling as "Allen".) Strange, a farmer, and his wife, Elizabeth, and moved to its present location at some time between 1867 and 1870. The Strange family continued to live at Lyndhurst Hall until at least 1955.

== Description ==
Lyndhurst Hall is a rare, possibly unique, example of a two storey portable, prefabricated timber dwelling. The building is also substantially intact and of considerable age dating from the early years of Colonial Victoria settlement. The building demonstrates the unusual construction techniques of hoop iron tongues socketed into the timber cladding. The former kitchen at the rear of the timber residence is believed to have been the original Strange family homestead. The building demonstrates changing patterns of occupancy of the family, and has historical associations with the early years of Victoria’s European settlement, particularly in the Brunswick and Coburg area.

== See also ==
- Architecture of Melbourne
- List of places on the Victorian Heritage Register in the City of Merri-bek
