= Peter Khalil =

Australian politician (born 1973)

Peter Khalil MP
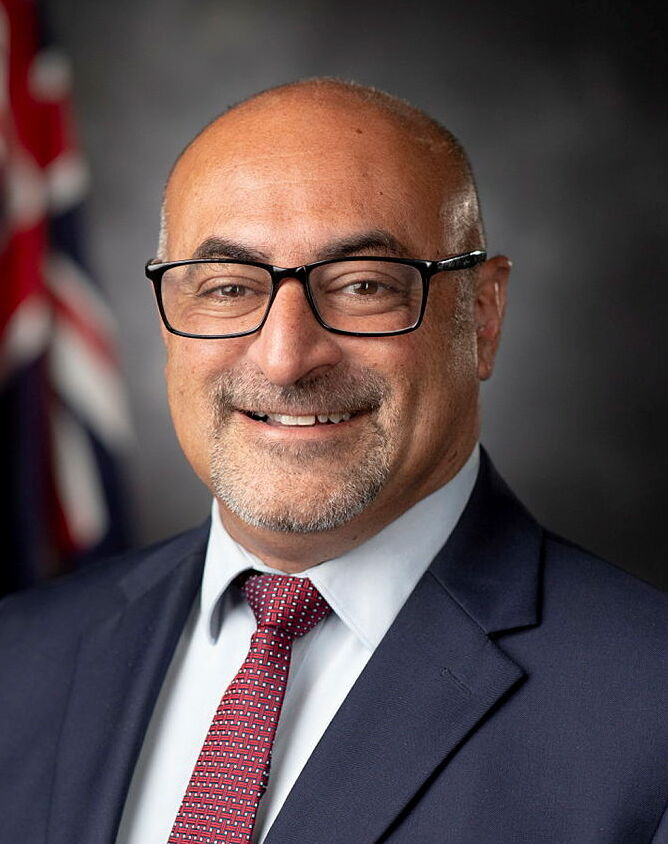
- Official portrait, 2025

Assistant Minister for Defence
- Incumbent
- Assumed office 13 May 2025
- Prime Minister: Anthony Albanese
- Preceded by: Matt Thistlethwaite

Member of the Australian Parliament for Wills
- Incumbent
- Assumed office 2 July 2016
- Preceded by: Kelvin Thomson

Personal details
- Born: 23 March 1973 (age 53) Melbourne, Victoria, Australia
- Party: Labor
- Education: University of Melbourne; Australian National University
- Profession: Lawyer; Policy analyst Political adviser
- Website: peterkhalil.com.au

Peter Khalil (born 23 March 1973) is an Australian politician. He is a member of the Australian Labor Party (ALP) and has served in the House of Representatives since the 2016 federal election, representing the Victorian seat of Wills.

Khalil was born in Melbourne to Egyptian Coptic parents. He studied law at the University of Melbourne and Australian National University, subsequently working for the Department of Defence and Department of Trade and Foreign Affairs. He briefly worked in Iraq with the Coalition Provisional Authority and later worked in the United States as analyst with the Brookings Institution and Eurasia Group. In 2007, Khalil was appointed as national security adviser to ALP leader Kevin Rudd. He was later a director of the Special Broadcasting Service (SBS) and member of the Victorian Multicultural Commission.

== Early life ==
Khalil was born in Melbourne on 23 March 1973. He is the son of Georgette and Fayek Khalil, and is a Coptic Christian. His parents migrated to Australia from Egypt in 1970. His father was a lawyer before moving to Australia, subsequently working for Australia Post and serving on the state executive of the Postal and Telecommunications Union. His mother worked in childcare, as an interpreter, and in the printing department of the Reserve Bank of Australia.

Khalil lived in public housing as a child. After leaving school, he competed on the international tennis circuit and was once ranked No. 25 domestically for singles. He competed in the boys' singles tournament at the 1990 Australian Open, losing to Todd Larkham in the first round. In 1996 Khalil gained the degrees of BA and LL.B. from the University of Melbourne and in 2001 graduated as a Master of Laws in the field of international law at the Australian National University.

== Professional life ==
After graduating from ANU, Khalil joined the Department of Defence as a strategic defence policy analyst. In 2003 he was seconded to the Coalition Provisional Authority (CPA) in Iraq, a body established by the US-led coalition forces during the Iraq War to govern the country after the removal of Saddam Hussein. He was appointed as the CPA's director of national security policy, reporting to CPA leader Paul Bremer and other CPA officials. Khalil lived in the Republican Palace, Baghdad, with his role including "providing advice on counter-terrorism and counter-insurgency, negotiating with Iraqi political leaders and working to rebuild Iraqi government ministries". As an Arabic speaker he met frequently with Iraqis, where he "made an effort to meet tribal leaders and religious leaders, academics and professionals as well as average people around the country to get their views".

Khalil returned to Australia in May 2004 and transferred to the Department of Foreign Affairs and Trade as assistant director of Iraq policy. In October 2004 he moved to New York City to take up an appointment as a visiting fellow with the Brookings Institution, working under fellow Australian expatriate Martin Indyk as part of the Project on U.S. Relations with the Islamic World within the Saban Center for Middle East Policy. After a year he moved to the Eurasia Group.

In February 2007, Khalil was appointed as principal national security adviser to opposition leader Kevin Rudd. He continued to work for Rudd after he became prime minister following the 2007 federal election, later moving to the office of defence minister Joel Fitzgibbon in 2008 as a senior adviser. On the issue of asylum seekers coming to Australia, reports from the US Embassy in 2009 show that Khalil actively advised Rudd to "calmly and rationally put the issue in perspective", specifically "that there were about 60,000 cases of visa over-stayers per year, while only 1000 asylum seekers entered Australian waters by boat by that stage in 2009". While working at the Brookings Institution, Khalil was a protected informant for the Embassy of the United States about internal Labor Party disputes surrounding refugee policy.

After leaving his role as a parliamentary adviser, Khalil joined lobbying firm Hawker Britton as an associate. In 2012 he was appointed as director of strategy and communications for the Special Broadcasting Service (SBS). He was also appointed to the Victorian Multicultural Commission in 2015, and was an Adjunct Associate Professor at the University of Sydney Centre for International Security.

== Parliamentary service ==
Khalil has credited the experiences of his parents with shaping his later political outlook: "They were striving to seek a better life in Australia. They were seeking a life of security, and opportunity and prosperity." He credited ALP prime minister Bob Hawke for the opportunities that opened up for his family once they had settled.

Khalil was preselected as the Australian Labor Party candidate for the federal Division of Wills at the 2016 federal election. At the time there was some controversy that the party's affirmative action targets were not being reached. He won both the nomination and the election, becoming the new member for seat in the 2016 Australian federal election, succeeding Kelvin Thomson, and became the first Coptic Christian to be elected to Federal Parliament in Australia.

He was re-elected in the 2019 Australian federal election increasing his primary vote by 6%. He claims that during that campaign some door knockers volunteering for the Australian Greens told people he was a "war criminal", due to his involvement in the Iraq War where he was director of national security policy in the provisional government.

In the 2022 federal election Khalil suffered a -5.4% reduction in his primary vote. He slightly increased his margin, by 0.1% to 58.6% on the Labor-Green two party preferred. He campaigned on his record of constituency work and the prospect of being a member of the next government. Joining Government benches for the first time, Khalil was appointed chair of the Joint Parliamentary Committee for Intelligence and Security. In July 2024, Prime Minister Albanese gave Khalil the additional responsibility of being Special Envoy for Social Cohesion, and in January 2025 in an interview with Michael Visontay, for The Jewish Independent, was called the 'government's official tightrope walker'.

Following the re-election of the Labor government in the 2025 federal election, Khalil was appointed Assistant Minister for Defence in the second Albanese ministry.

== Political views ==
As of 2021, Khalil was a member of the Labor Right faction.

=== Housing ===
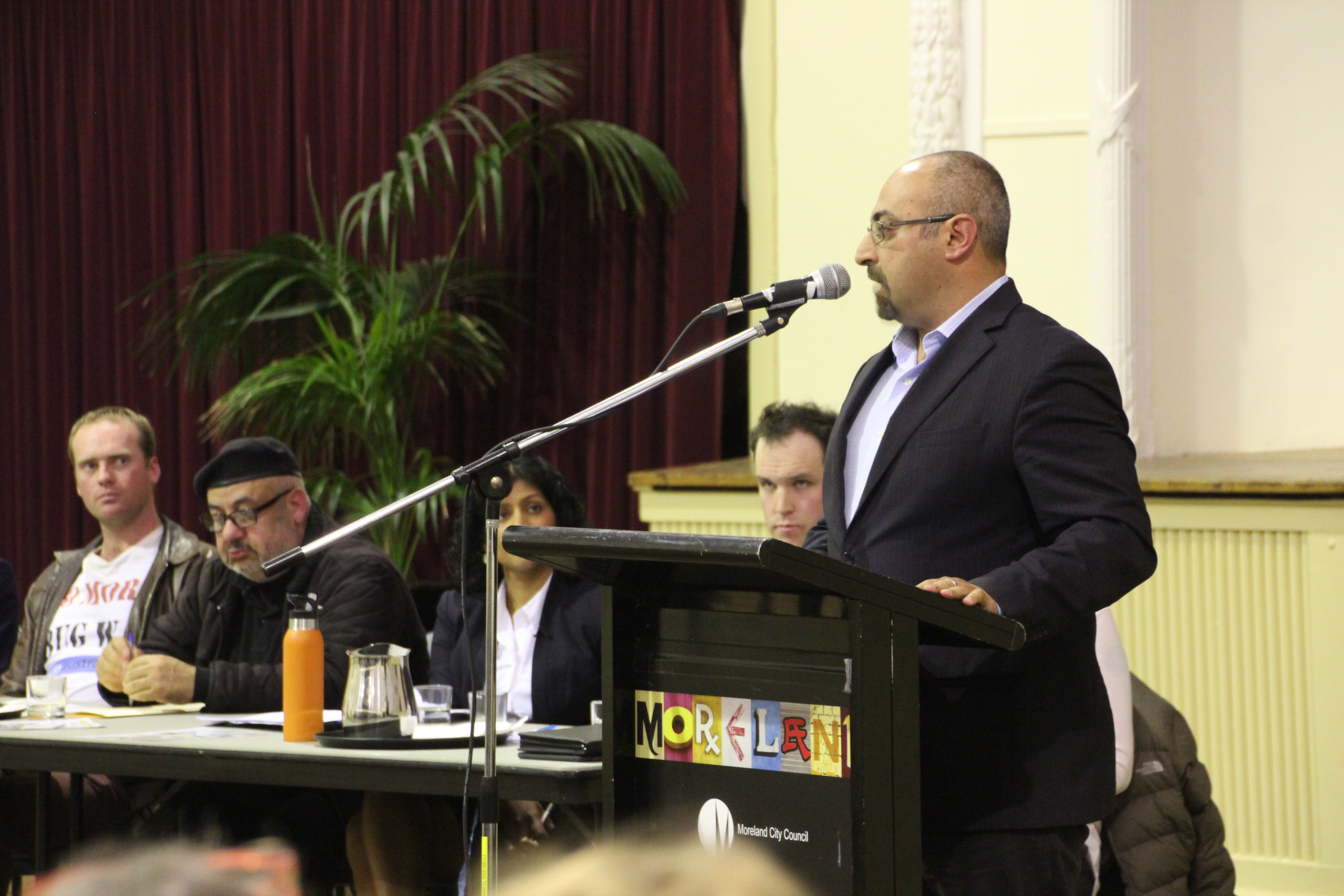
Peter Khalil addressing a candidates forum in 2016

Khalil is proud of having been raised in public housing, writing in 2020 of how "affordable housing helped level the playing field, it offered us real equality of opportunity" and "helped me and others rise out of disadvantage". He is critical of federal government that it has allowed the level of public housing stock to slip since the 1990s. Equally, he was critical of state government authorities for the heavy handed lockdown that seemed to target public housing estates in Melbourne in July 2020 would only "entrench disadvantage".

=== Economy and energy ===
Khalil conforms to classical Labor concerns for Australia, particularly that its "...wages have been stagnant under this government, there's been underemployment and a lack of investment". However, he was an early supporter of Government tax cuts after the 2019 election. On energy, Khalil has withdrawn support from Adani's Carmichael coal mine because "it doesn't stack up commercially and environmentally". He sees gas differently, believing that as Australia moves towards a less carbon intensive future: "Gas is a good transitional source."

=== Multi-ethnic Australia ===
From his Parliamentary position, Khalil advocates for a welcoming posture towards immigrants. When an assistant minister for multicultural affairs Jason Wood, suggested that "most migrants when they come here don't know what it means to be Australian, Khalil countered that:

Our values of freedom, of equality of opportunity, of a fair go are why new migrants have made and are making a commitment to Australia as their home. This understanding is in fact what has driven the tremendous contributions of millions of migrants who have come to call Australia home...

During the early months of the outbreak of COVID-19, he spoke up for detainees who have cleared security checks, saying, "Releasing them will both protect the physical and mental health of these refugees and asylum seekers, and assist in the nationwide efforts to slow the spread of coronavirus." When an Iranian refugee under Australia's protection was blocked from returning to Australia, Khalil's intervention saw Border Force change its decision.

=== Global democracy ===
Khalil is a strong supporter of the Western alliance, having served with Coalition forces in Iraq and with the Brookings Institution as visiting fellow. In an article co-written with Michael Danby and Carl Ungerer, Khalil has argued that, "Bowing to Beijing would be the modern equivalent of the Munich Agreement". He went on to argue for a containment of Chinese totalitarian threats to democratic nations, saying:

It is in Australia's most vital strategic interest that the US presence in our region is not weakened or undermined. This is not because we seek to thwart China's legitimate aspirations and interests. It's because we are a liberal democracy whose interests are best served by a stable, prosperous region in which all countries evolve towards more democratic forms of government, as is indeed happening, most notably in Indonesia.

Khalil was appointed the deputy chair to the Joint Standing Committee on Treaties in mid 2019, working alongside Dave Sharma. He has stated himself to be "a very strong supporter of the US alliance". Khalil expresses great concern about the health of global institutions that once could be expected to follow democratic principles, such as the World Health Organization. He's understood to be part of Parliamentary Friends of Democracy with then fellow Labor colleague Senator Kimberley Kitching and several Coalition figures. Khalil has contributed to The Tocsin the official publication of the social democratic think tank, John Curtin Research Centre.

In May 2020, Khalil joined 20 other Australian parliamentarians, from several parties, in making a statement against the Chinese Communist Party's decision to assume greater control over Hong Kong, the message read, in part, "This is a comprehensive assault on the city's autonomy, rule of law, and fundamental freedoms. The integrity of one-country, two-systems hangs by a thread." In 2022 Khalil was made Australian Co-Chair for the Inter-Parliamentary Alliance on China, a global group who work to ensure that an authoritarian Chinese does not interfere with the governance and principles of the world's democracies.

== Awards ==
Khalil was awarded the Humanitarian Overseas Service Medal for his service in Iraq.

== Personal life ==
Khalil met his wife Lydia while working in Iraq, where she was working as a counterterrorism adviser. As of 2024 he lives in Pascoe Vale. Khalil has investment properties in Pascoe Vale and Murumbeena.

Khalil supports the Collingwood Football Club in the Australian Football League and the Coburg Football Club in the Victorian Football League. He is a member of the Australian Workers Union.

Parliament of Australia
Preceded by Kelvin Thomson	Member for Wills; 2016–present	Incumbent
