= Strathmore Heights =

- Suburb
- Interactive map of Strathmore Heights
- Coordinates: 37.713°S 144.897°E
- Country: Australia
- State: Victoria
- City: Melbourne
- LGA: City of Moonee Valley
- Location: 12 km (7.5 mi) from Melbourne
- Established: 1960

Government
  - State electorates: Essendon; Niddrie
  - Federal division: Maribyrnong

Area
  - Total: 0.7 km^{2} (0.27 sq mi)
- Elevation: 83 m (272 ft)

Population
  - Total: 1,047 (2021 census)
  - Density: 1,500/km^{2} (3,870/sq mi)
- Postcode: 3041
Suburbs around Strathmore Heights
Tullamarine	Gowanbrae	Glenroy
Airport West	Strathmore Heights	Oak Park
Airport West; Essendon Fields	Essendon Fields	Strathmore

Strathmore Heights is a suburb in Melbourne, Victoria, Australia, 12 km (7.5 mi) north-west of Melbourne's Central Business District, located within the City of Moonee Valley local government area. Strathmore Heights recorded a population of 1,047 at the 2021 census.

Strathmore Heights is located between Essendon Airport, the Albion–Jacana freight railway line, Moonee Ponds Creek and the Moonee Ponds Creek Trail.

== History ==
Strathmore Heights was developed in 1960 by Strathmore Heights Proprietary Limited, a company promoted by Bruce Small, famed for his proprietorship of Malvern Star bicycles and sponsorship of world champion cycling athlete, Sir Hubert Opperman. From 1945, Bruce Small had also owned adjacent land at Gowanbrae, north of Strathmore Heights .Being just north of Essendon Airport, which was the original Melbourne International Airport, many of the streets have aviation names such as:

- Boeing Road
- Lockheed Street
- De Havilland Avenue
- Fokker Street
- Vickers Avenue
- Caravels Crescent
- Douglas Court
- Northrop Court

== Public transport ==
Strathmore Heights, being remote from the rail system, is serviced solely by the following bus route:

- 469 Moonee Ponds – Niddrie SC via Essendon RS, Strathmore, Airport West Shopping town. Operated by Kastoria Bus Lines.

Tram route 59, operating between Airport West and the city, Glenroy railway station and Oak Park railway stations are the nearest form of rail-based public transport.

== Demographics ==
According to data from the 2016 census:

- The most common ancestries in Strathmore Heights were Australian 23.0%, English 22.4%, Irish 8.5%, Italian 8.3% and Scottish 7.0%.
- In Strathmore Heights, 77.0% of people were born in Australia. The most common countries of birth were Italy 2.4%, England 1.7%, Greece 1.6%, Sri Lanka 1.6% and New Zealand 1.3%.
- The most common responses for religion in Strathmore Heights were Catholic 36.7%, No Religion, so described 25.0%, Anglican 10.1%, Not stated 7.1% and Eastern Orthodox 6.8%. In Strathmore Heights, Christianity was the largest religious group reported overall (66.6%) (this figure excludes not stated responses).
- In Strathmore Heights, 75.4% of people only spoke English at home. Other languages spoken at home included Greek 4.8%, Italian 3.3%, Arabic 1.8%, Sinhalese 1.7% and Turkish 1.4%.

== See also ==
- City of Essendon – Strathmore Heights was previously within this former local government area.
