= Wentworth House =

Heritage-listed house in Melbourne, Victoria, Australia

- Location within Melbourne
- Former names: La Rose

General information
- Status: Completed
- Architectural style: Old Colonial Georgian
- Location: 22 Le Cateau Street, Pascoe Vale South, Melbourne, Victoria, Australia
- Coordinates: 37°44′36″S 144°56′10″E
- Year built: 1842–1870
- Completed: 1870; 156 years ago
- Client: Dr Farquhar McCrae
- Owner: Farquhar McCrae (1842–1852); Coiler Robertson (1852–c. 1855); James Robertson (c. 1855–1886); anor.

Technical details
- Material: Bluestone; slate; bricks; timber
- Floor count: 1
- Grounds: 112 ha (276 acres) (until 1877); 4,047 m^{2} (1 acre)

Victorian Heritage Register
- Official name: Wentworth House
- Type: Registered place
- Designated: 9 October 1974
- Reference no.: H0138
- Heritage overlay no.: HO103
- Category: Residential buildings (private)

Register of the National Estate
- Official name: Wentworth House
- Type: Defunct register
- Designated: 21 March 1978
- Reference no.: 5575

Wentworth House, formerly known as La Rose, is a Victorian Colonial house at 22 Le Cateau Street in Pascoe Vale South, a northern suburb of Melbourne, Australia. Completed in states between c. 1842 and 1870, the house is believed to be the oldest extant house in Victoria.

The building was added to the Victorian Heritage Register on 9 October 1974 in recognition of its architectural and historical significance; and was also added to non-statutory list by the now defunct Register of the National Estate on 21 March 1978.

== History ==
Dr Farquhar McCrae migrated from Scotland in 1839 with his mother, wife, sisters and children. McCrae was from the Scottish gentry, and was immediately successful in the Colony of Port Phillip, becoming a magistrate and the director of several companies and a bank, and was prominent in early colonial society. From c. 1842, McCrae began building a house at Pascoe Vale, on the banks of the Merri Creek, known as La Rose during the nineteenth century, and moved into the house around that time. His sister-in-law was Georgiana McCrae, who made several references to Farquhar and La Rose in her diaries.

Farquhar McCrae got into financial difficulties during the depression of the early 1840s, and in c. 1845 moved to Sydney, where he practised medicine. During this time La Rose was leased and farmed by Coiler Robertson, who purchased it in 1852, after McCrae's death. It passed in the mid 1850s to James Robertson (probably Coiler's son), a partner with Robert and Peter McCracken in one of Melbourne's most successful brewery companies, who resided in the property until his death in 1886. The property of more than 112 hectares (276 acres) remained intact until 1887, after which it was progressively subdivided, from 1920 by the War Service Homes Commissioner.

Renamed as Wentworth House between 1908 and 1911, the house is located on approximately 0 hectares (1 acre). In 1937, it was reported that the widow of Mr M. R. Agar was the owner of Wentworth House.

== Description ==
Wentworth House is a single storey bluestone house with a gabled slate roof, designed by an unknown architect in a simple Old Colonial Georgian style. It is a U-plan house with the rear wings enclosing a courtyard, and was built in three stages. The first stage was probably completed in 1842, and consisted of an asymmetrical bluestone rubble house of three main rooms, one on one side and two on the other side of a central hall, and with a kitchen attached at the rear.

The house was later enlarged considerably, probably in the 1850s. A large cut bluestone wing of three rooms was then added to the west side of the house, consisting of a principal room with the front wall extended out in a bay, and probably two bedrooms at the rear; another room was added behind the kitchen, and these rear wings now enclosed a court; verandahs were built across the front and sides of the house, onto which the main front rooms opened through French windows, and around two sides of the rear court; a six-room detached service block was also built at the rear, which included a larger kitchen, two other service rooms and probably also three servants' rooms.

In about 1870 a three-room brick addition, with a cellar beneath, was built onto the east side of the original east wing. There were also bluestone outbuildings, including a combined stable and coach house, which collapsed in 1991, and a two-room toilet block. The garden retains little of its original layout and only a few plants of any age, including two pepper trees and three olive trees, probably planted in about 1900. There are also some gums and box trees which are probably regrowth from the original native flora on the site.

== See also ==
- Architecture of Melbourne
- List of places on the Victorian Heritage Register in the City of Merri-bek
- McCrae Homestead
