= Brunswick West =

- Suburb
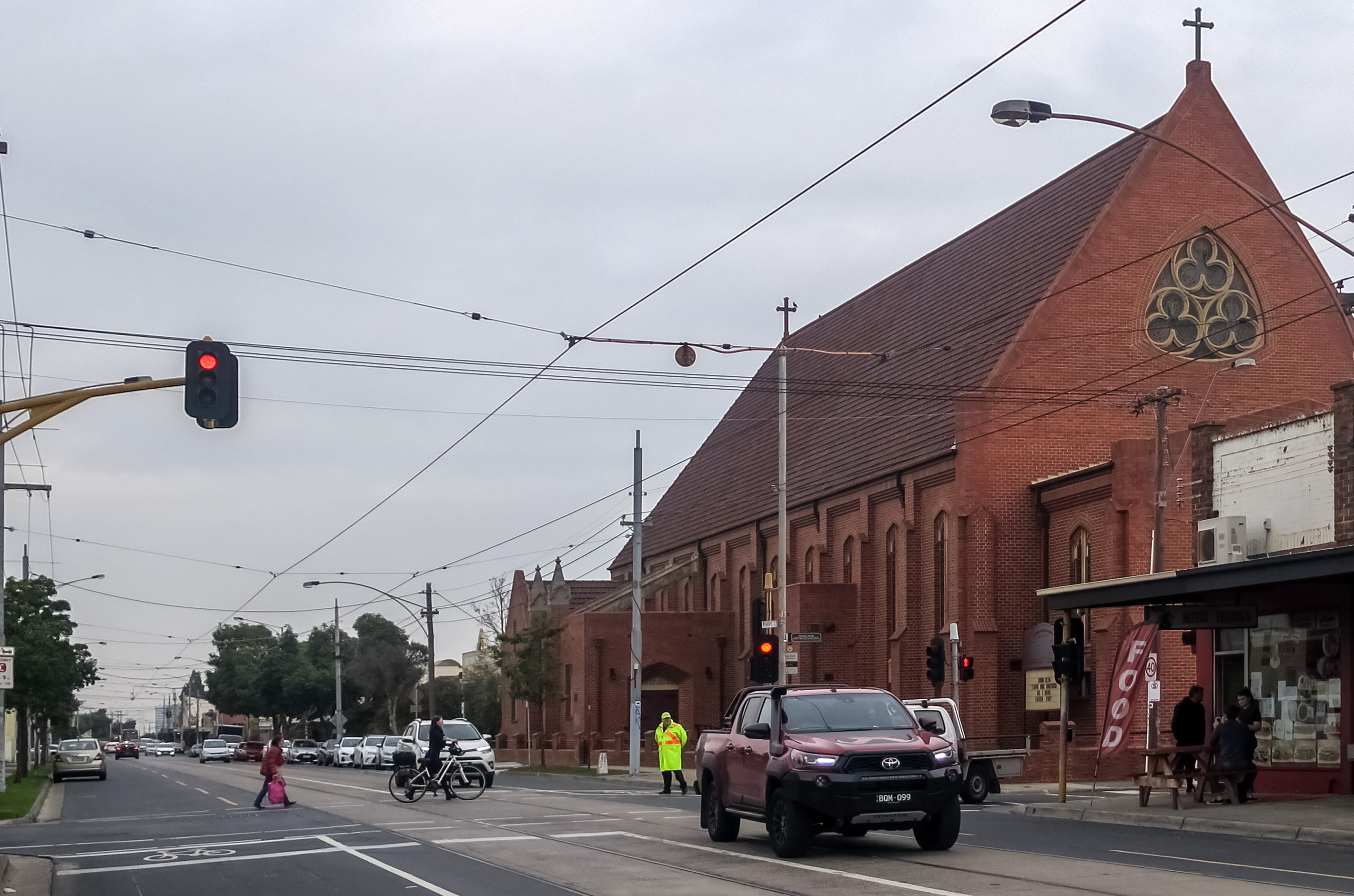
- Melville Road Brunswick West

- Interactive map of Brunswick West
- Coordinates: 37.761°S 144.943°E
- Country: Australia
- State: Victoria
- City: Melbourne
- LGA: City of Merri-bek
- Location: 6 km (3.7 mi) N of Melbourne

Government
  - State electorates: Brunswick; Pascoe Vale
  - Federal divisions: Maribyrnong; Wills

Area
  - Total: 3.2 km^{2} (1.2 sq mi)
- Elevation: 50 m (160 ft)

Population
  - Total: 14,746 (2021 census)
  - Density: 4,610/km^{2} (11,930/sq mi)
- Postcode: 3055
Suburbs around Brunswick West
Essendon	Pascoe Vale South	Coburg
Moonee Ponds	Brunswick West	Brunswick
Ascot Vale	Parkville	Parkville

Brunswick West is an inner-city suburb in Melbourne, Victoria, Australia, 6 km (3.7 mi) north of Melbourne's Central Business district, located within the City of Merri-bek local government area. Brunswick West recorded a population of 14,746 at the 2021 census.

Brunswick West adjoins Parkville to the south, Moonee Ponds at the Moonee Ponds Creek to the west, Pascoe Vale South and Coburg along Moreland Road to the north, and Brunswick along Grantham, Pearson and Shamrock Streets to the east. Parts of the suburb also borders the Tullamarine Freeway.

Brunswick West is primarily a residential suburb with some light industry.

== History ==
Brunswick West Post Office opened on 10 March 1913. There is a Moonee Vale Licensed Post Office at 164 Melville Road Brunswick West.

== Demographics ==
In Brunswick West, 59.7% of people were born in Australia. The other most common countries of birth were Italy 4.3%, India 3.2%, Greece 3.0%, England 2.2% and China (excludes SARs and Taiwan) 1.9%.

59.9% of people only spoke English at home. Other languages spoken at home included Italian 6.9%, Greek 6.2%, Arabic 3.0%, Mandarin 2.2% and Spanish 1.1%.

== Commerce ==
Grantham Street and Melville Road are the two main commercial activity centres in Brunswick West, comprising small-scale traditional shopping strips, with a small shopping centre (Union Square) on Grantham Street.

== Transport ==
=== Bus ===
There are several bus routes on the main east–west streets:

- 503 : Essendon station – Brunswick East via Brunswick West, Brunswick, Anstey station (Monday to Saturday). Operated by Dysons. Located along Albion Street.
- 504 : Moonee Ponds Junction – Clifton Hill station via Brunswick West, Brunswick, Carlton North, Fitzroy North (Monday to Saturday). Operated by Dysons. Located along Brunswick Road.
- 506 : Moonee Ponds Junction – Westgarth station via Brunswick West, Brunswick, Fitzroy North, Northcote (Monday to Saturday). Operated by Dysons. Located along Dawson, Pearson, Smith and Allard Streets.
- 508 : Alphington station – Moonee Ponds Junction via Brunswick West, Brunswick station, Northcote, Fairfield (every day). Operated by Dysons. Located along Victoria Street.
- 509 : Hope Street – Barkly Square Shopping Centre via Sydney Road, Melville Road, Brunswick RS (Monday to Saturday). Operated by Dysons.
- 510 : Essendon station – Ivanhoe station via Brunswick, Northcote and Thornbury. Operated by Kinetic Melbourne. Located along Moreland Road.
- Night Bus 951 : Brunswick RS – Glenroy station via West Coburg (operates Saturday and Sunday mornings only). Operated by Ventura Bus Lines.

=== Cycling ===
For cyclists, many streets have cycle lanes and the suburb also adjoins the Moonee Ponds Creek Trail to the west, and the Capital City Trail to the south.

=== Tram ===
Tram route 58 provides the main north–south link through the suburb and to the city, with a route that runs along Melville Road, Dawson Street and Grantham Street.

== Educational facilities ==
Brunswick West has two government primary schools, Brunswick South-West Primary School and Brunswick North-West Primary School, and a Catholic school, St. Joseph's School.

== Open space ==
The largest area of public open space is formed by the reservations along the Moonee Ponds Creek, which run adjacent to the Tullamarine Freeway. Dunstan Reserve, in the suburb's north, has two ovals, and there are several smaller reserves distributed through the residential area.

The central section of Brunswick West also benefits from the adjacent Brunswick Central Parklands which run along the eastern boundary of Brunswick West between Hope Street and Dawson Street.

== See also ==
- City of Brunswick – Brunswick West was previously within this former local government area.
- Brunswick Cricket Club – Home ground is in Brunswick West.
