= Strathmore, Victoria =

Strathmore
- Suburb
- Interactive map of Strathmore
- Coordinates: 37.734°S 144.921°E
- Country: Australia
- State: Victoria
- City: Melbourne
- LGA: City of Moonee Valley
- Location: 10 km (6.2 mi) from Melbourne

Government
  - State electorate: Essendon
  - Federal division: Maribyrnong

Area
  - Total: 6.8 km^{2} (2.6 sq mi)
- Elevation: 36 m (118 ft)

Population
  - Total: 8,980 (2021 census)
  - Density: 1,321/km^{2} (3,420/sq mi)
- Postcode: 3041
Suburbs around Strathmore
Strathmore Heights, Essendon Fields	Oak Park	Pascoe Vale
Essendon North	Strathmore	Pascoe Vale South
Essendon	Essendon	Pascoe Vale South

Strathmore is a suburb in Melbourne, Victoria, Australia, 10 km (6.2 mi) north-west of Melbourne's Central Business District, located within the City of Moonee Valley local government area. Strathmore recorded a population of 8,980 at the 2021 census.

Strathmore is bordered by Woodland Street to the south, Bulla Road and Essendon Airport in the west, and the Moonee Ponds Creek to the north and north-east, and Pascoe Vale Road to the east.

The Tullamarine Freeway divides the suburb into northern and southern halves. Strathmore Heights is a small pocket at the far north of the suburb.

== History ==
The first land sales in the area of Strathmore were made in 1843 and 1845 in the Parish of Doutta Galla. Major Frederick Berkley St John was the purchaser of the Strathmore North area (Section 23). The other major purchaser (Section 15, Parish of Doutta Galla) covering the Strathmore area was Edward Jones Brewster. Both made significant fortunes from land speculation.

Brewster subdivided and sold 100 acres (400,000 m^{2}) of land to Thomas Napier, who occupied the land and left a lasting legacy to the area – the origin of its name. The area of Strathmore was originally called North Essendon. The name of "Strathmore" was first suggested by the Rev. John Sinclair in 1936 and was initially adopted by the church. The name was derived from Thomas Napier's Scottish heritage, the Valley of Strathmore, Scotland, close to where he once lived. The name was submitted to Essendon Council in 1943. In 1955 the Victorian Railways changed the name of the station from North Essendon to Strathmore. Strathmore Post Office opened on 1 October 1953.

In 1979, Strathmore was transferred from the City of Broadmeadows to the City of Essendon. In 1994, it became a part of the City of Moonee Valley.

== Landmarks ==
Napier Park is a 10-acre (40,000 m^{2}) block bounded by Woodland and Napier Streets, Noble Avenue and Glenbervie Road. It was donated to Essendon Council in 1920 by Theodore Napier, the son of Thomas Napier. It is a carefully preserved woodland block which gives visitors an idea of what the Strathmore Area was like prior to European Settlement. The park includes a stand of river red gums (Eucalyptus camaldulensis). These trees are protected under the National Register of Significant Trees, and their presence is a requirement under the terms of the original gift. There is only one other such stand of Redgums in the Melbourne area.

Boeing Reserve is a large reserve in Strathmore Heights, with two cricket ovals, three AFL ovals and a baseball field. The reserve takes up much of the suburb of Strathmore Heights, and has a large, wooden sculpture at the south end, it also has a function centre, football/cricket/baseball clubrooms, a toilet, drinking taps, several tracks and a playground, as well as a lot of open grass areas.

Other important landmarks are Lebanon Reserve, Essendon Airport, the Trestle Bridge, Tullamarine Freeway and the Moonee Ponds Creek.

Former Premier John Brumby is a resident of Strathmore.

== Demographics ==
According to data from the 2021 census:

- The most common ancestries in Strathmore were Australian 21.4%, English 20.3%, Italian 12.0%, Irish 10.9% and Scottish 5.9%.
- In Strathmore, 78.7% of people were born in Australia. The most common countries of birth were Italy 2.2%, England 2.0%, India 1.1%, New Zealand 1.0% and China (excludes SARs and Taiwan) 0.9%.

The most common responses for religion in Strathmore were Catholic 40.2%, No Religion, so described 25.6%, Anglican 8.1%, Not stated 7.0% and Eastern Orthodox 4.7%. In Strathmore, Christianity was the largest religious group reported overall (66.5%) (this figure excludes not stated responses).

In Strathmore, 77.7% of people only spoke English at home. Other languages spoken at home included Italian 4.5%, Greek 2.3%, Turkish 1.9%, Mandarin 1.1% and Arabic 0.8%.

== Transport ==
The suburb is serviced by the Strathmore railway station on the Craigieburn railway line.

Cyclists have easy access to the Moonee Ponds Creek Trail along the Moonee Ponds Creek.

There is also a bus route operating between Airport West – Essendon station, which passes through Strathmore.

== Education ==
The area contains several schools, including Strathmore Primary School, Strathmore North Primary, St Vincent De Paul Catholic School and Strathmore Secondary College.

== Sport ==
FC Strathmore Split is a soccer team based at Strathnaver Reserve and play in the Football Victoria Men's State League 1 North-West.

Lebanon Reserve is the home of the Strathmore Football Club, a member of the Essendon District Football League. This reserve is located on the banks of the Moonee Ponds Creek.

== Notable residents ==
- John Brumby – 45th Premier of Victoria
- Father Gerard Dowling OAM
- Rob Hulls – Former Victorian Attorney General and 23rd Deputy Premier of Victoria
- Paul McNamee – Tennis player
- Glenn Robbins – Actor and television host

== See also ==
- City of Broadmeadows – Strathmore was previously within this former local government area.
- City of Essendon – Strathmore was previously within this former local government area (1979-1994).
