= Pascoe Vale railway station =

Railway station in Melbourne, Australia

Pascoe Vale
- Northbound view from Platform 1, September 2026

General information
- Location: Burgundy Street, Pascoe Vale, Victoria 3044; City of Merri-bek; Australia
- Coordinates: 37°43′49″S 144°55′42″E
- System: PTV commuter rail station
- Owner: VicTrack
- Operator: Metro Trains
- Line: Craigieburn
- Distance: 11.27 kilometres from Southern Cross
- Platforms: 2 side
- Tracks: 2
- Connections: Bus

Construction
- Structure type: Ground
- Parking: 91
- Cycle facilities: Yes
- Accessible: Yes – step free access

Other information
- Status: Operational, unstaffed
- Station code: PVL
- Fare zone: Myki zone 1/2
- Website: Public Transport Victoria

History
- Opened: 10 November 1885; 140 years ago
- Electrified: September 1921 (1500 V DC overhead)

Passengers
2005–2018 numbers
2005–2006	367,533
2006–2007	410,952 ▲11.81%
2007–2008	460,107 ▲11.96%
2008–2009	515,446 ▲12.02%
2009–2010	555,273 ▲7.72%
2010–2011	541,214 ▼2.53%
2011–2012	497,596 ▼8.05%
2012–2013	Not measured
2013–2014	520,726 ▲4.64%
2014–2015	532,966 ▲2.35%
2015–2016	579,470 ▲8.72%
2016–2017	626,276 ▲8.07%
2017–2018	645,054 ▲2.99%
- 2018–2019: 657,930 ▲1.99%
- 2019–2020: 545,050 ▼17.15%
- 2020–2021: 239,250 ▼56.1%
- 2021–2022: 256,800 ▲7.33%
- 2022–2023: 422,850 ▲64.66%
- 2023–2024: 530,800 ▲25.53%

Services
Preceding station	Metro Trains	Following station
Strathmore towards Flinders Street	Craigieburn line	Oak Park towards Craigieburn
Track layout
Location

Pascoe Vale station is a railway station operated by Metro Trains Melbourne on the Craigieburn line, part of the Melbourne rail network. It serves the northern suburb of the same name in Melbourne, Victoria, Australia. Pascoe Vale is a ground-level unstaffed station, featuring two side platforms. It opened on 10 November 1885.

== History ==
Pascoe Vale station opened along with the railway line past the site of the station, as part of the North East line to School House Lane. The station, like the suburb itself, was named after Pascoeville, a property owned by John Pascoe Fawkner, one of the founders of the city of Melbourne.

The original station building, erected on Platform 1 in 1886, was replaced in the 1970s. In 1929, a signal box was provided, which controlled interlocked gates at the Gaffney Street level crossing, until they were replaced with boom barriers in 1965.

== Platforms and services ==
Pascoe Vale has two side platforms and is served by Craigieburn line trains.

Pascoe Vale platform arrangement
Platform	Line	Destination	Via	Service Type	Notes	Source
1	Craigieburn line	Flinders Street	City Loop	All stations	See City Loop for operating patterns	
2	Craigieburn line	Craigieburn		All stations		

== Transport links ==
Two bus routes operate to and from Pascoe Vale station, under contract to Public Transport Victoria:

- 542 : to Roxburgh Park station (operated by CDC Melbourne)
- 561 : to Macleod (operated by Dysons)

== Gallery ==
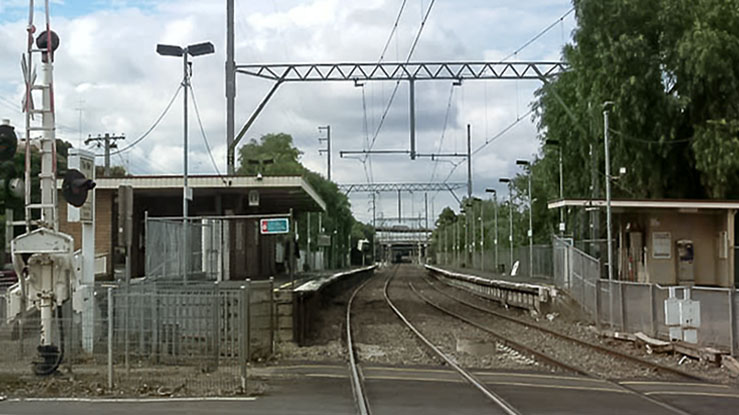
Southbound view of the station platforms, viewed from the Gaffney Street level crossing, March 2005

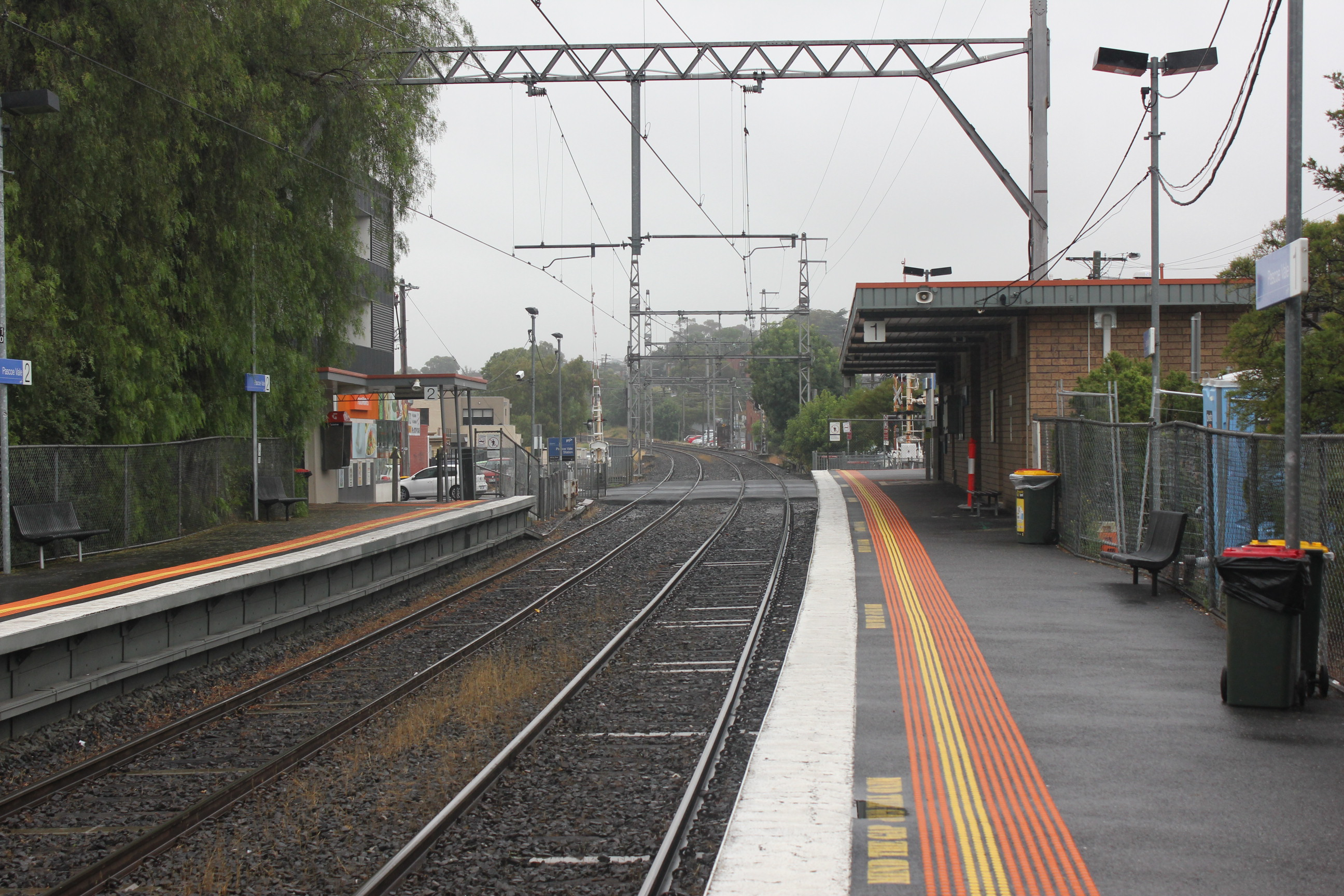
Northbound view from Platform 1, January 2015

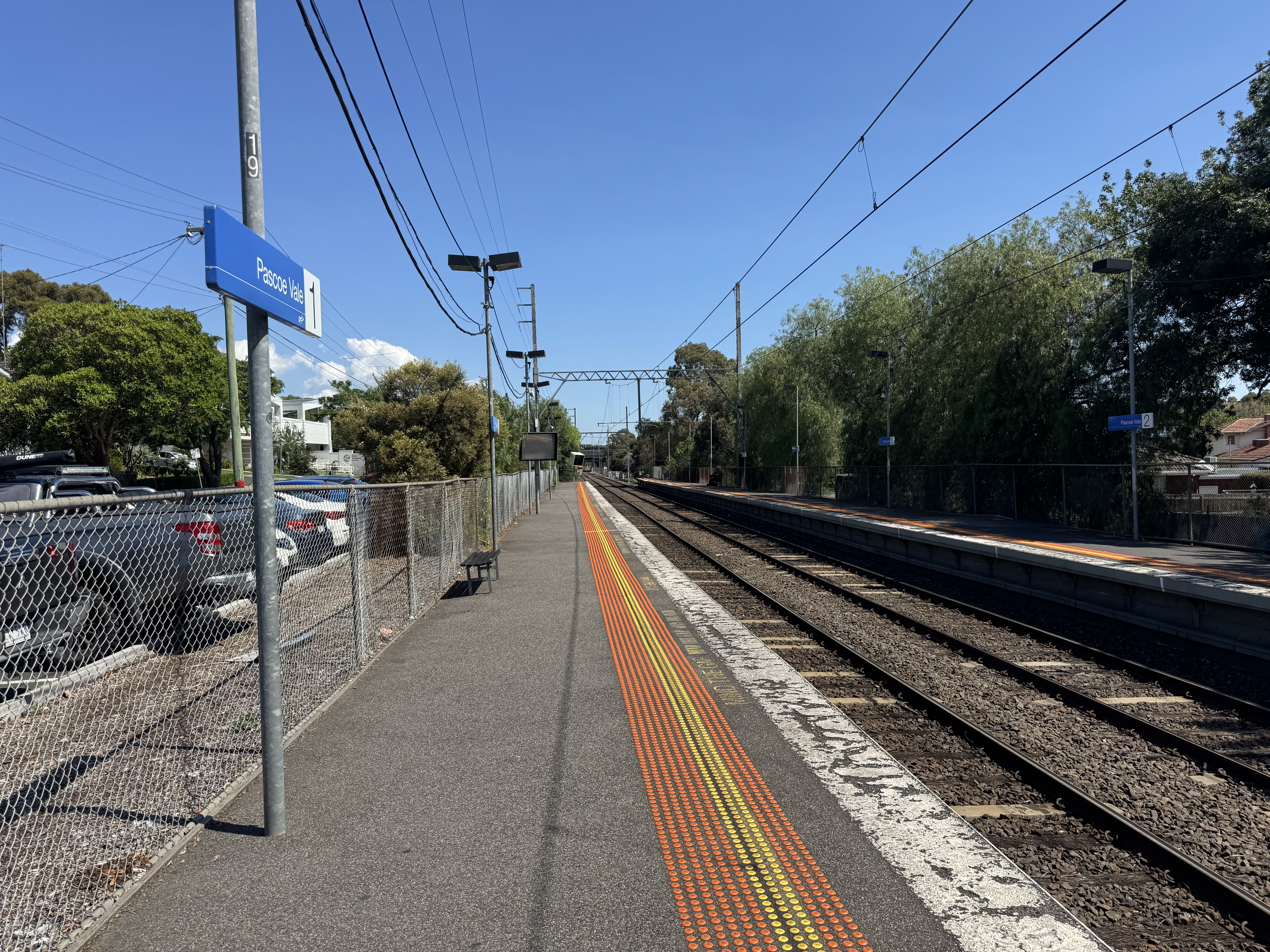
Southbound view from Platform 1, November 2024

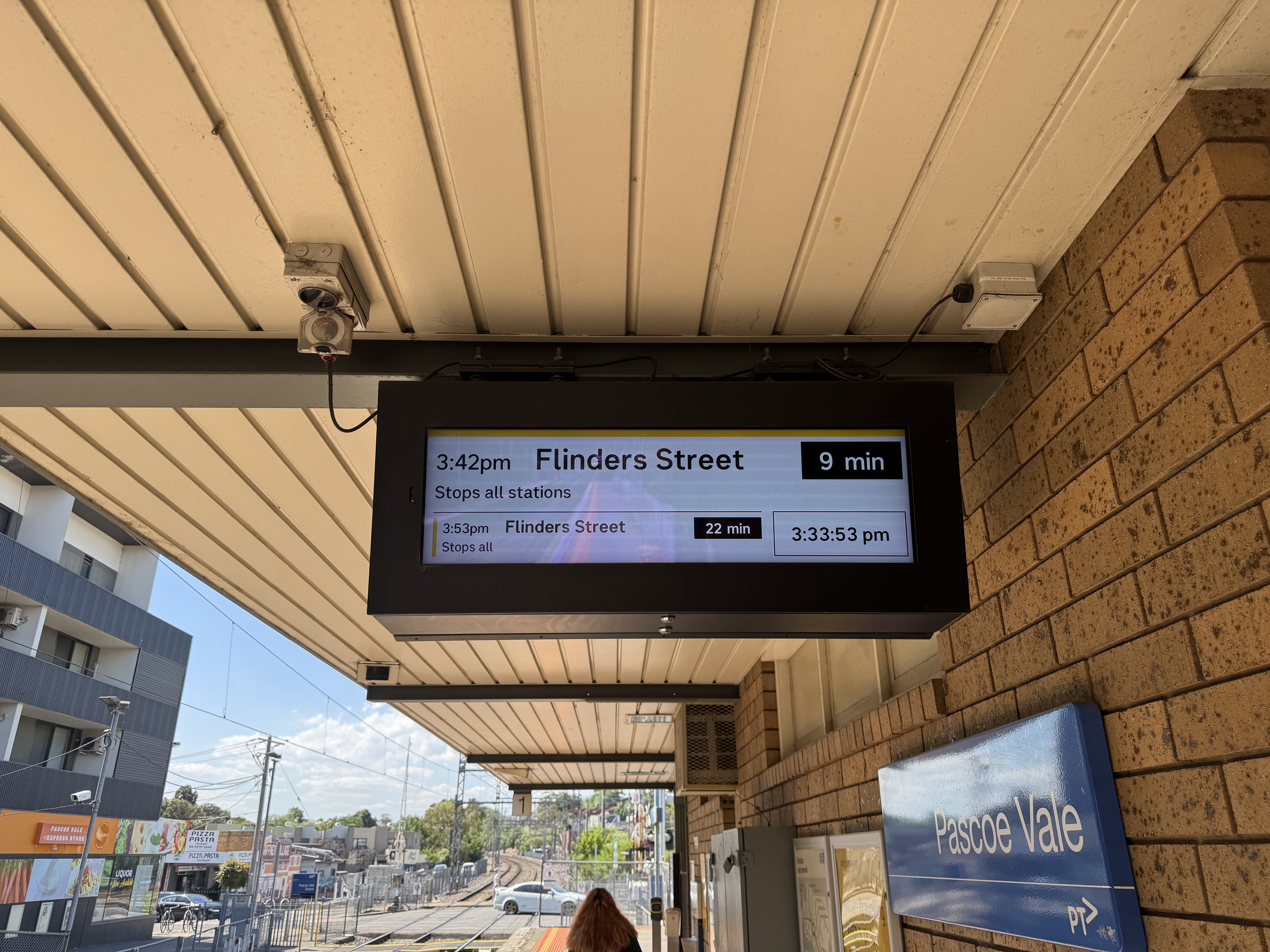
A PID on Platform 1 displaying an up Craigieburn service to Flinders Street, November 2024

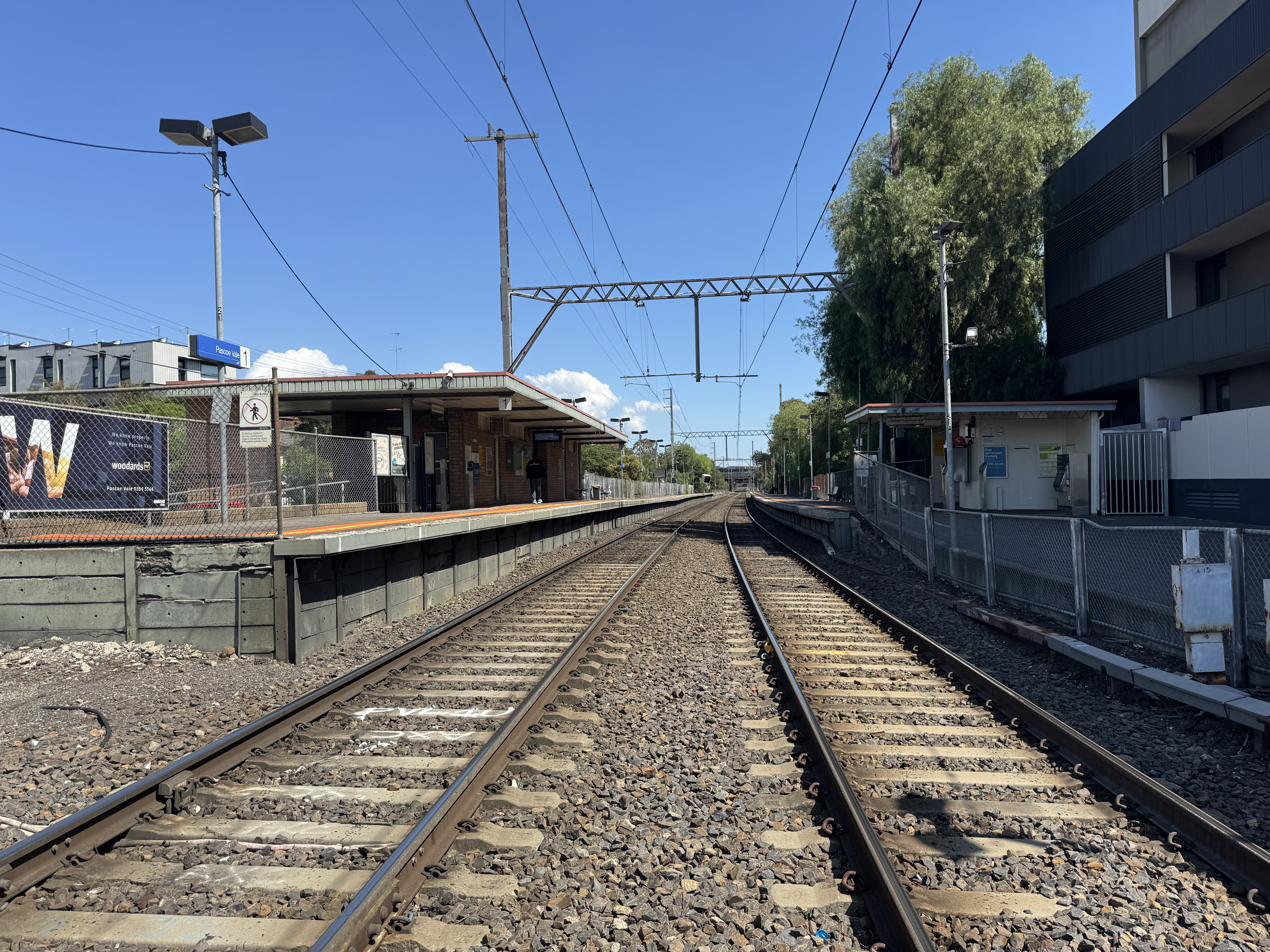
Southbound view of the station platforms, November 2024

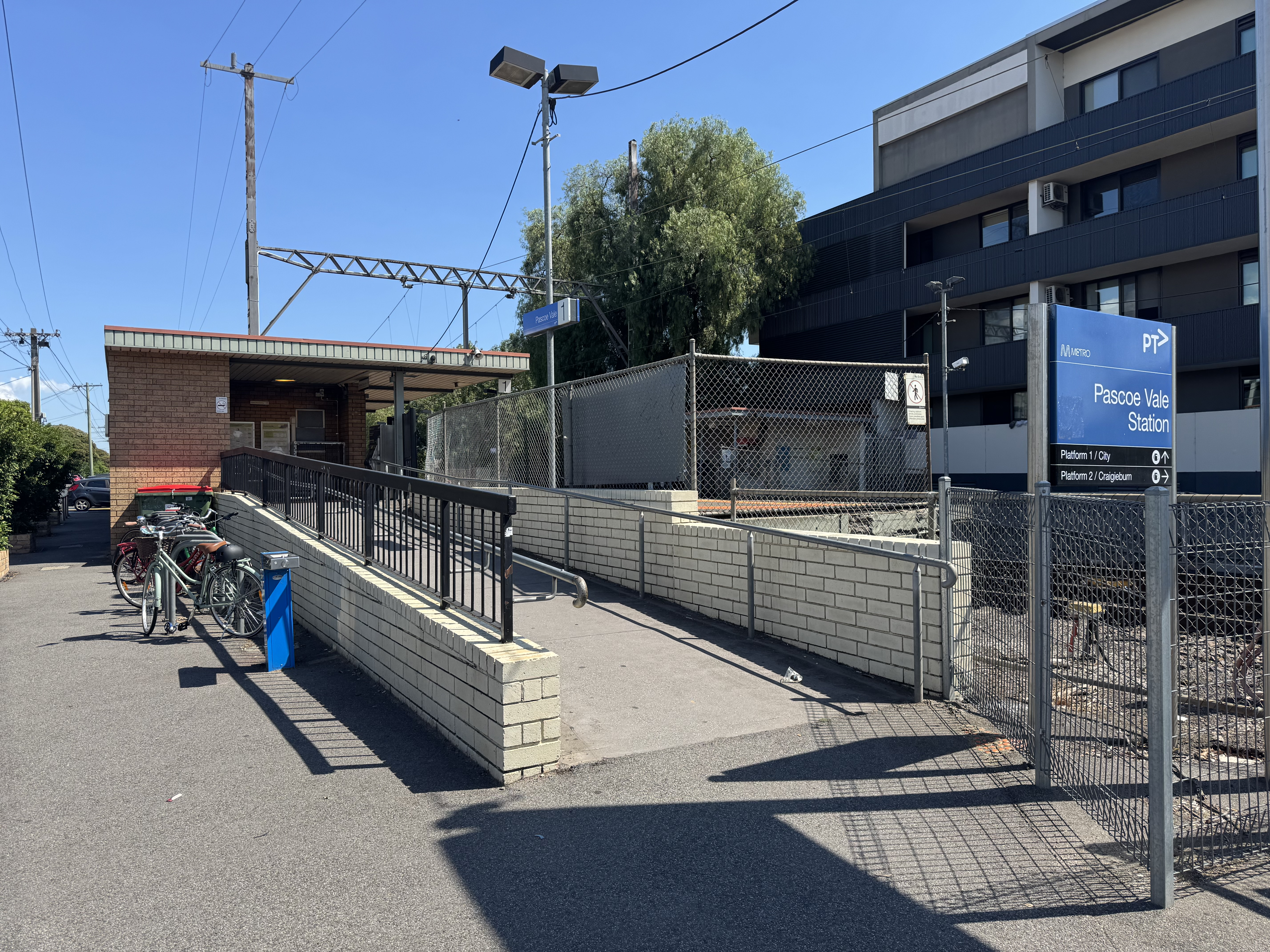
Station building, ramp and entrance to Platform 1 from Gaffney Street, November 2024

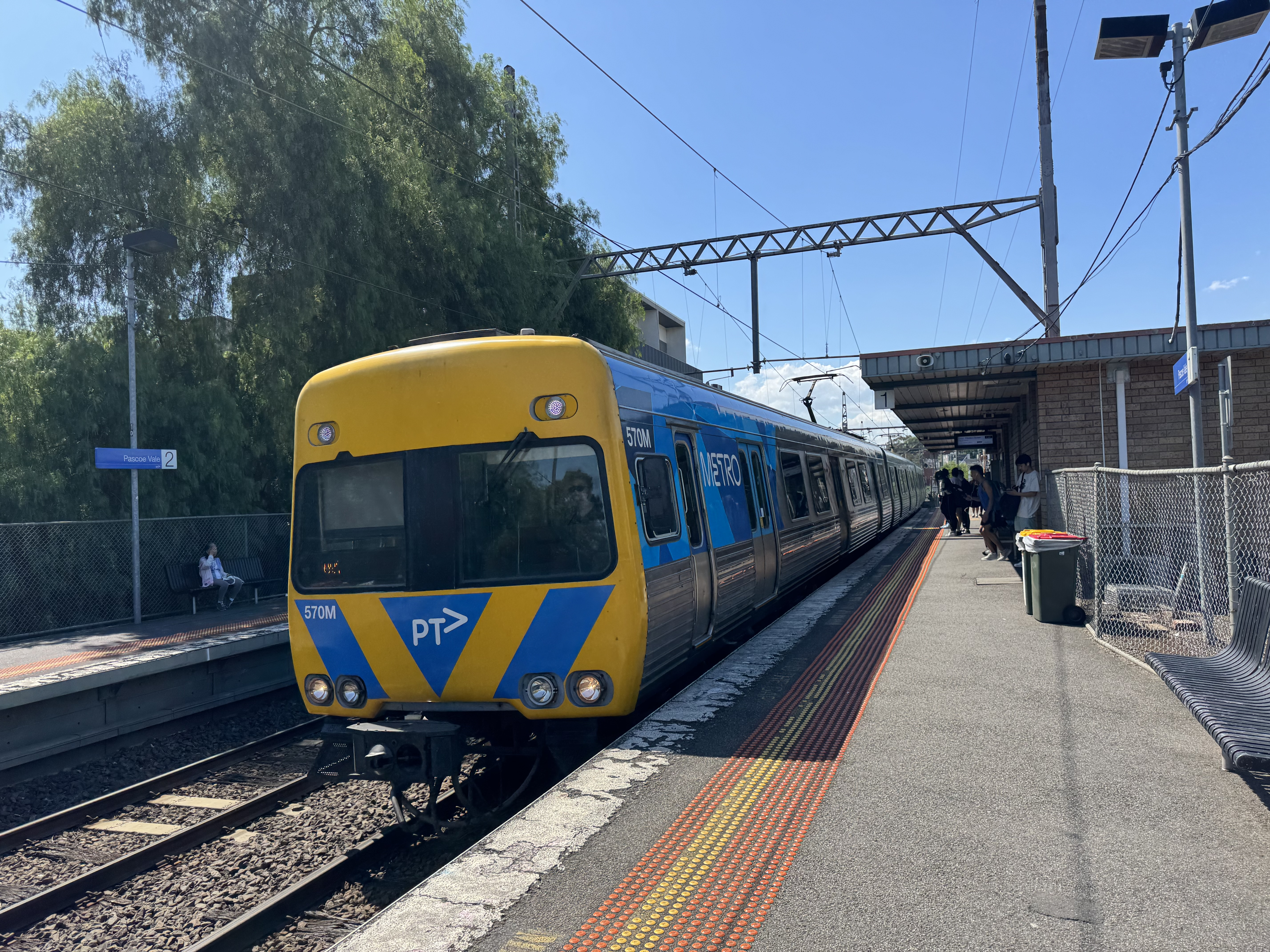
A Flinders Street-bound Comeng train arrives at Platform 1, November 2024
