= Moonee Ponds Creek =

River in Victoria, Australia

Coordinates: 37°49′S 144°56′E

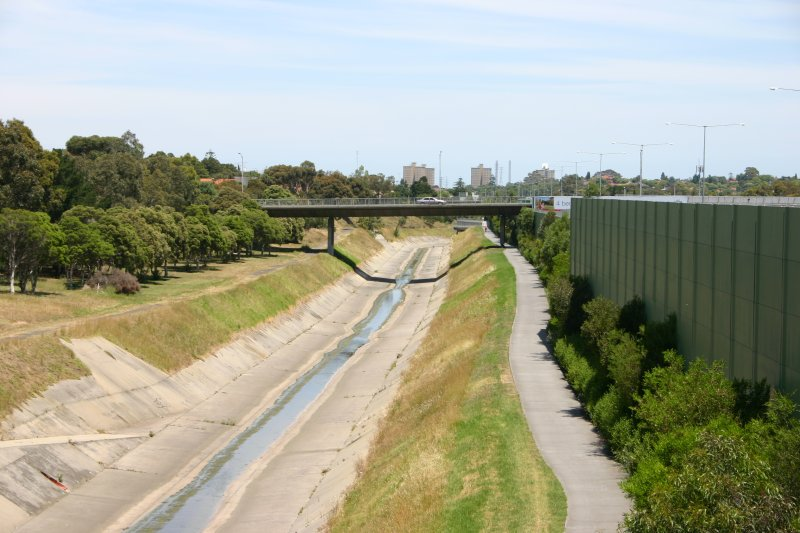
Moonee Ponds Creek as a stormwater drain at Brunswick West

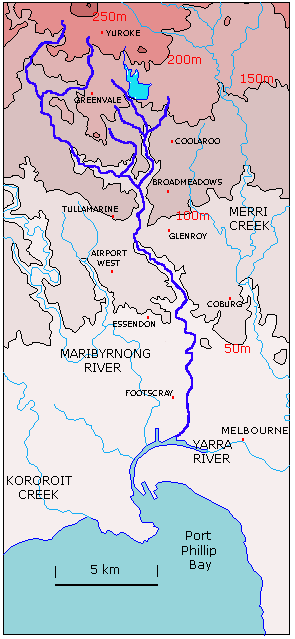
Map of Moonee Ponds Creek

The Moonee Ponds Creek is a creek and major tributary of the Yarra River running through urban Melbourne, Victoria, Australia from northern to inner suburbs. In 2004 a reporter for The Age described it as "arguably the most abused tributary of the Yarra River, and part of the true underside of Melbourne".

It is rural in its upper sections near Greenvale, passing across basalt plains around Woodlands Historic Park, just north of Melbourne Airport. Towards its mouth it is hemmed in by the Cenozoic caps of Essendon and Royal Park before joining the Yarra River.

Through the heavily urbanised areas it flows through it is best characterised as a concrete stormwater drain.

It winds its way through the suburbs of Westmeadows, Meadow Heights, Tullamarine, Broadmeadows, Gowanbrae, Glenroy, Strathmore Heights, Oak Park, Strathmore, Pascoe Vale, Pascoe Vale South, Essendon, Brunswick West, Moonee Ponds, Ascot Vale, Flemington, Parkville, North Melbourne (where its artificially widened section is named Railway Canal) before joining the Yarra River at Melbourne Docklands.

== History ==
Before European settlement, the Moonee Ponds Creek was the home of the Wurundjeri People of the Kulin nation. Though there are no written records it is probable that the creek takes its name from an indigenous inhabitant Moonee Moonee, who, along with Tullamareena, burnt down and escaped from the first Melbourne gaol in 1838. The Port Phillip area was first colonised by Europeans in 1835. The first land sales in the area of Strathmore on Moonee Ponds Creek were made in 1843 and 1845.

The creek formed a series of marshy ponds on the floodplain, with extensive salt water marshes near its entry to the Yarra river known as Batman's lagoon. With rapid development of Melbourne due to the Victorian gold rush in the 1850s, the swamp quickly became a receptacle for waste waters from Flemington, North Melbourne and Parkville.

In 1879 Batman lagoon was drained and filled to make way for the North Melbourne railway yards at its northern end. At its southern area, the filled in marshes were called Dudley Flats, where impoverished people scrounged building material from the land-fill tip to build shelters and huts during the 1930s depression.

In the 1890s the lower Moonee Ponds Creek was widened for use as a canal for barges carrying coal to the North Melbourne Locomotive Depot.

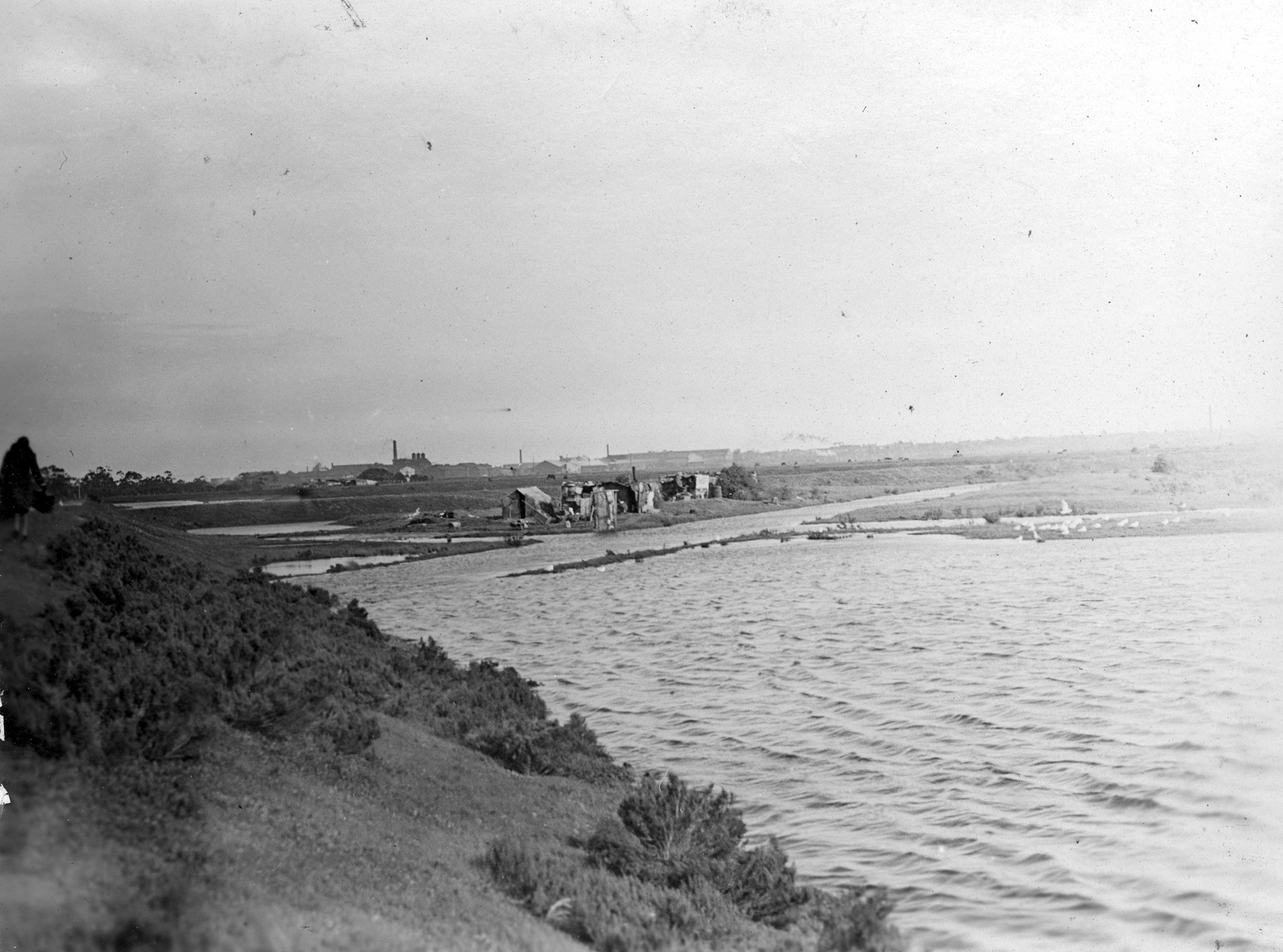
"Dudley Mansions" a notorious collection of slums built from tip waste alongside the salt lakes of West Melbourne swamp at the banks of Moonee Ponds Creek ca. 1935 F. Oswald Barnett (photographer) State Library Victoria 2001.291/69

In 1950s and 1960s the Melbourne and Metropolitan Board of Works realigned and concreted the creek from Strathmore to Flemington Road, in an attempt to stop periodic flooding. The modifications were part of extensive urban development of the lower floodplain. For much of its length through the northern suburbs it is now characterised as a concrete stormwater drain that parallels the Tullamarine Freeway.

In 1998 the Moonee Ponds Creek Co-ordination Committee Inc (MPCCC) was founded to oversee planning, restoration, education, and development of guidelines and policies aimed at protecting and enhancing the Creek and its tributaries. The MPCCC members are each of the four councils (Hume, Merri-bek, Moonee Valley and Melbourne) and the Friends of Moonee Ponds Creek. MPCCC also has excellent working relationships with Melbourne Water, Parks Victoria, Department of Sustainability, Department of Primary Industries and Port Phillip and Westernport Catchment Management Authority.

In 2002 the downstream end of the creek was realigned, to accommodate development of Victoria Dock at the Port of Melbourne. Moving the confluence with the Yarra River about 600 metres upstream, the creek mouth once located at the east end of Appleton Dock was removed, with a new watercourse dug leading directly south parallel with the Bolte Bridge approach spans. The realignment created a buffer zone between the port and the Melbourne Docklands residential and commercial areas. While realigning waterways is not a preferred option for Melbourne Water, the work was permitted as previous modifications had left the creek lacking a "true remaining 'natural' alignment" in the area.

== Conservation ==
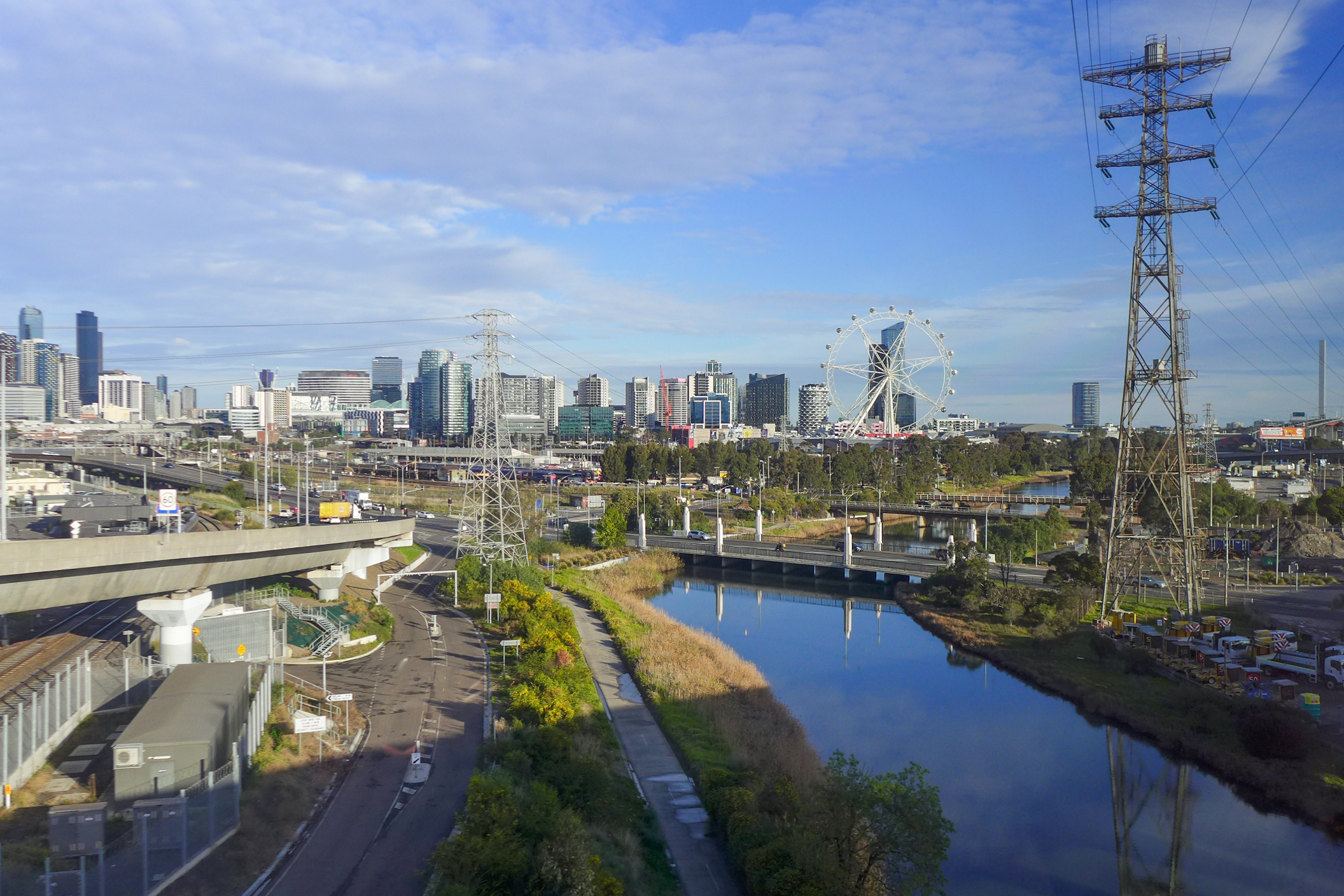
Railway Canal near 37 Dynon Rd at North Melbourne

In recent years some improvement work has focused on enhancing habitat and stabilising, reshaping and replanting the banks of the creek. In 2005 the water quality, aquatic life and flow were all rated as poor; vegetation was rated as very poor; habitat and stability were rated as good.

During 2004 a major stormwater improvement program was embarked upon in the creek's catchment area, and wetlands at Jacana and litter traps have been built. Recent habitat conservation work has resulted in some wildlife returning to the creek, including the pobblebonk frog around the Strathmore Secondary College, and nankeen night heron in the upper catchment.

Along the entire length of the Moonee Ponds Creek, starting at Melbourne Docklands and continuing to Woodlands Homestead within Woodlands Historic Park, a shared pathway the Moonee Ponds Creek Trail provides a recreational path for cyclists and walkers, connecting many reserves, parks and sporting grounds along the creek.

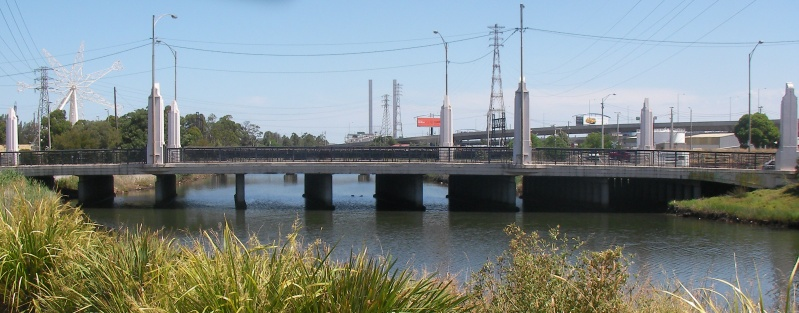
Dynon Road bridge
