= Parkdale railway station =

Railway station in Melbourne, Australia

Parkdale
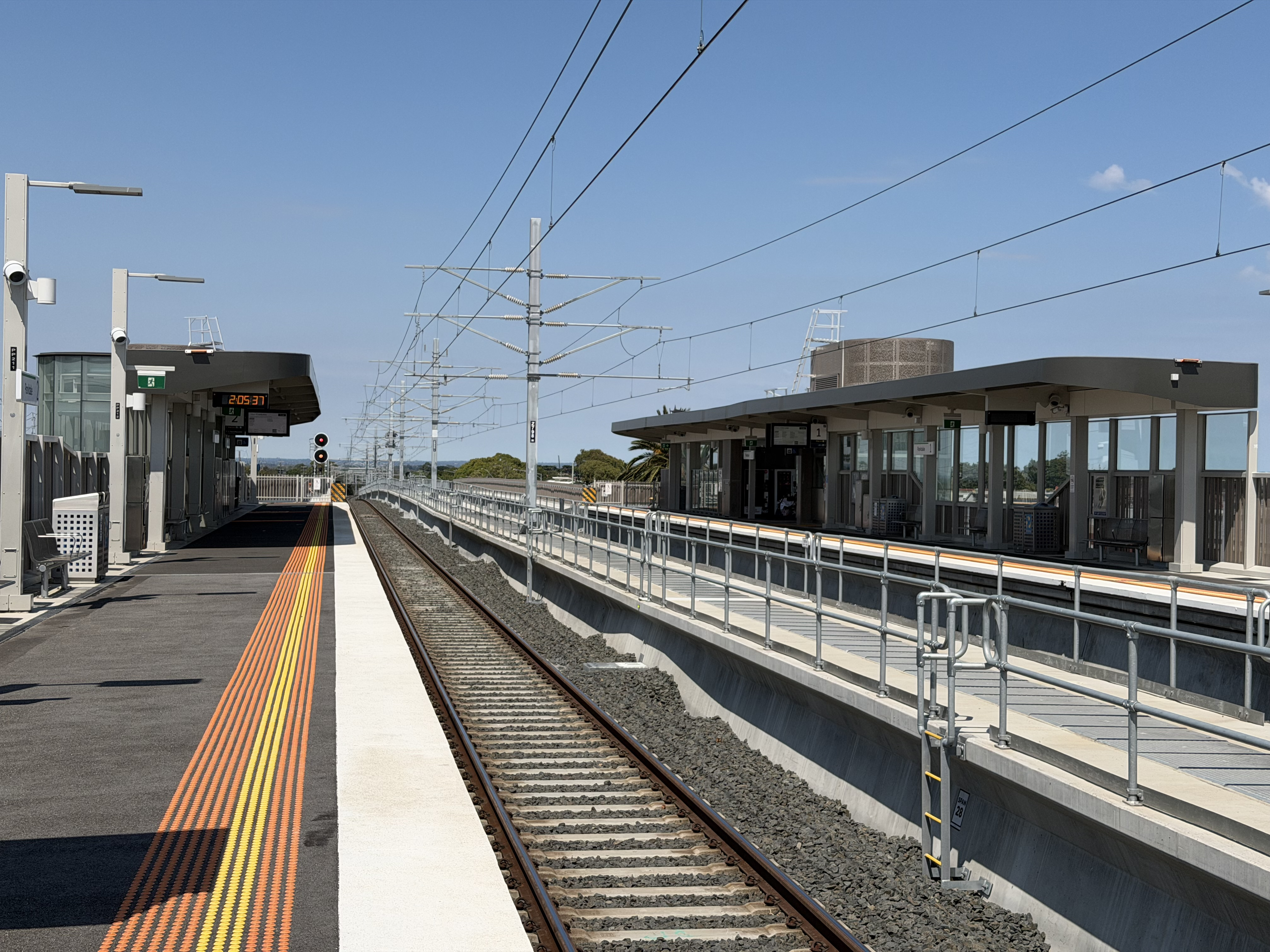
- Southbound view from Platform 2, February 2026

General information
- Location: Como Parade West, Parkdale, Victoria 3195; City of Kingston; Australia
- Coordinates: 37°59′35″S 145°04′34″E
- System: PTV commuter rail station
- Owner: VicTrack
- Operator: Metro Trains
- Line: Frankston
- Distance: 25.93 kilometres from Southern Cross
- Platforms: 2 side
- Tracks: 2
- Connections: Bus

Construction
- Structure type: Elevated
- Accessible: Yes — step free access

Other information
- Status: Operational, unstaffed
- Station code: PKD
- Fare zone: Myki zone 2
- Website: Public Transport Victoria

History
- Opened: 1 September 1919; 107 years ago
- Rebuilt: 2 August 2024 (LXRP)
- Electrified: June 1922 (1500 V DC overhead)

Passengers
- 2005–2006: 356,385
- 2006–2007: 379,993 ▲6.62%
- 2007–2008: 413,897 ▲8.92%
- 2008–2009: 451,099 ▲8.98%
- 2009–2010: 458,410 ▲1.62%
- 2010–2011: 497,593 ▲8.54%
- 2011–2012: 461,610 ▼7.23%
- 2012–2013: Not measured
- 2013–2014: 390,164 ▼15.47%
- 2014–2015: 401,104 ▲2.8%
- 2015–2016: 403,603 ▲0.62%
- 2016–2017: 396,640 ▼1.72%
- 2017–2018: 425,987 ▲7.39%
- 2018–2019: 429,257 ▲0.76%
- 2019–2020: 299,300 ▼30.27%
- 2020–2021: 161,900 ▼45.9%
- 2021–2022: 179,650 ▲10.96%
- 2022–2023: 231,600 ▲28.91%

Services
Preceding station	Metro Trains	Following station
Mentone towards Flinders Street via City Loop	Frankston line	Mordialloc towards Frankston
Track layout
Location

Parkdale station is a railway station operated by Metro Trains Melbourne on the Frankston line, part of the Melbourne rail network. It serves the south-eastern suburb of Parkdale, in Melbourne, Victoria, Australia.

Parkdale station is an elevated unstaffed station, with two side platforms. It opened on 1 September 1919, with the current station built in August 2024 as part of the Level Crossing Removal Project.

== History ==
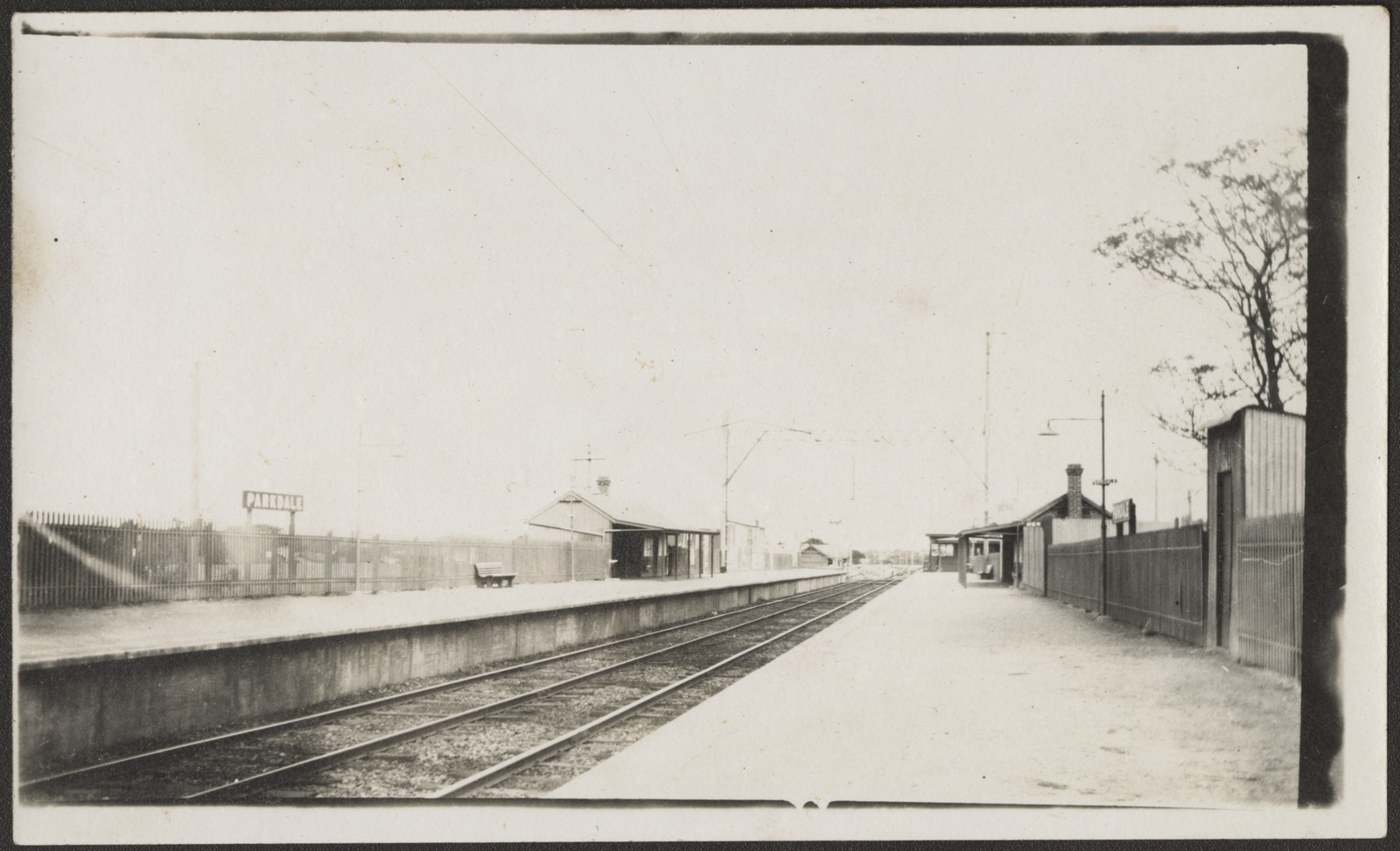
Southbound view from former ground level Platform 1, September 1919

Parkdale station opened on 1 September 1919. Like the suburb itself, it was named after W. Parker, an early landowner in the area.

A disused signal box was located at the Frankston (down) end of Platform 1. It was abolished in 1986, when boom barriers replaced interlocked gates at the former Parkers Road level crossing, which was also located at the down end of the station.

On 4 May 2010, as part of the 2010/2011 State Budget, $83.7 million was allocated to upgrade Parkdale to a premium station, along with nineteen others. However, in March 2011, this was scrapped by the Baillieu Government.

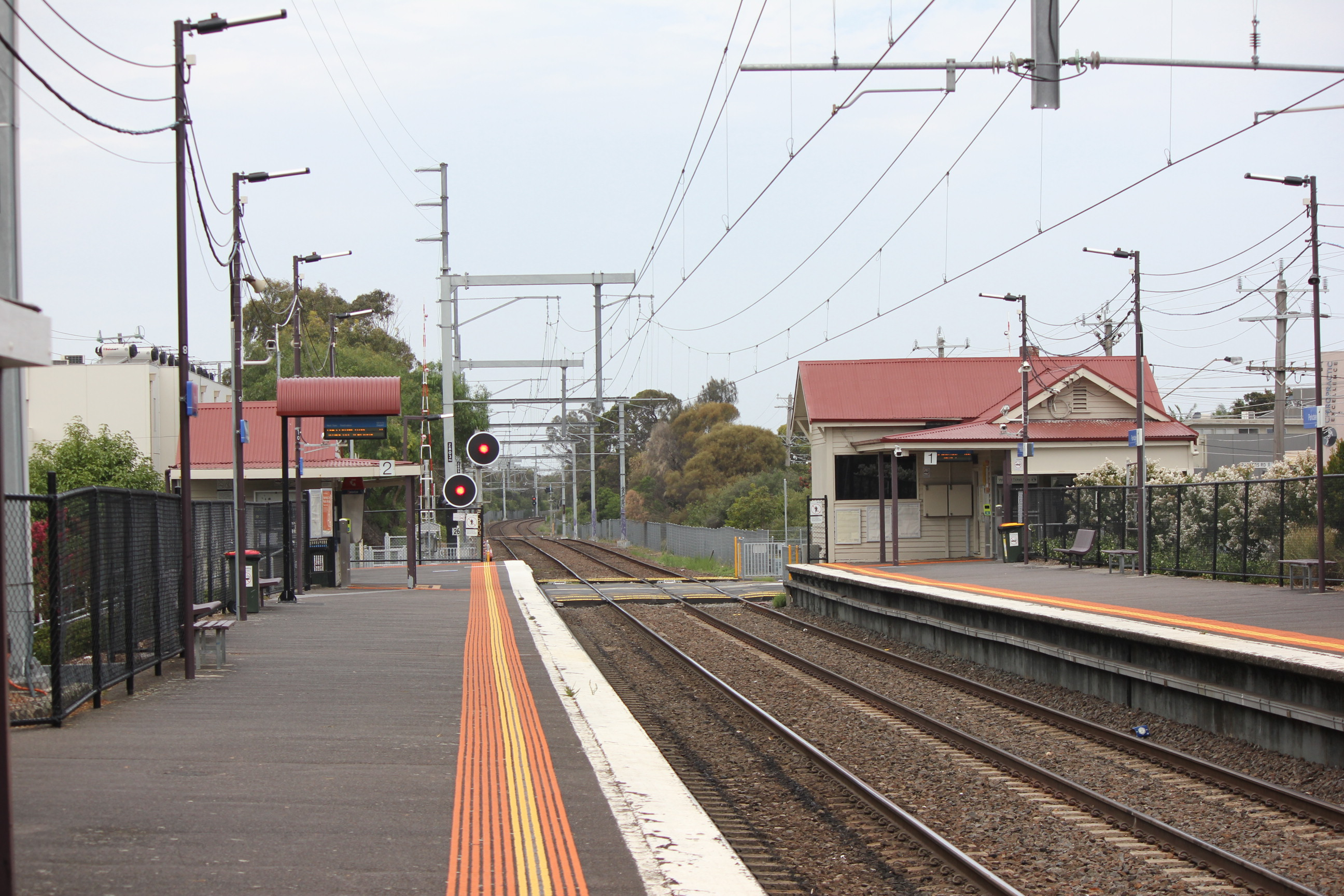
Southbound view from the former ground level Platform 2, January 2018

On 29 July 2021, the Level Crossing Removal Project announced that the level crossing would be grade separated by 2025. The project involved elevating the line over the road, and rebuilding the station. In late May 2023, construction commenced on the project.

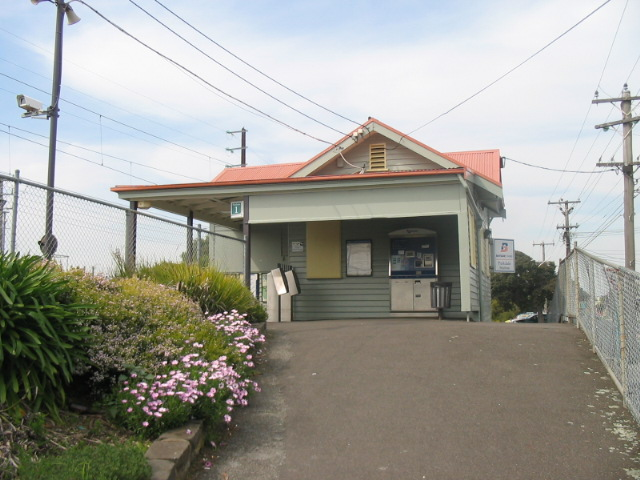
Former ground level station building and entrance to Platform 1 prior to the station building fire, October 2005

In the early hours of 9 April 2023, the station building on platform 1 was severely damaged by an arson attack. The fire completely engulfed and heavily damaged the station building and the facilities within the structure.

On 22 October 2023, the old ground level station was closed with Frankston Line services shifted onto a temporary alignment while the elevated rail bridge was constructed. Services began running on the temporary alignment on 6 November with a shuttle bus running between Mentone and Mordialloc whilst the station was closed.

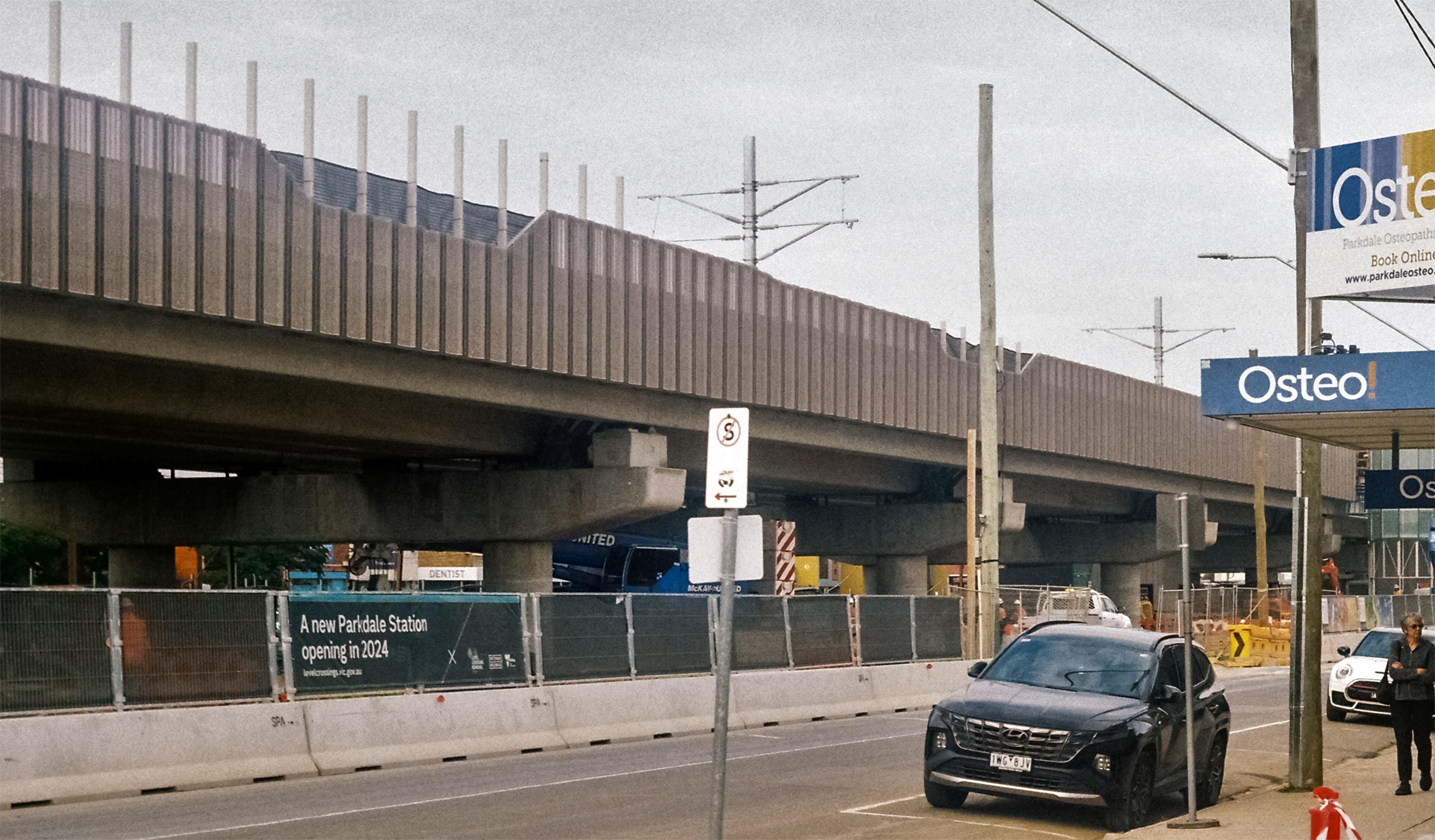
View of elevated Parkdale station under construction from Como Parade West, May 2024

On 14 July 2024, the Warrigal Road and Parkers Road level crossing and equipment were eliminated alongside the temporary ground level alignment being dismantled. The new Parkdale station alongside the new elevated rail bridge was opened to passengers on 2 August 2024.

== Platforms and services ==
Parkdale has two side platforms. It is serviced by Metro Trains' Frankston line services.

Parkdale platform arrangement
Platform	Line	Destination	Via	Service Type	Notes	Source
1	Frankston line	Flinders Street	City Loop	All stations and limited express services		
2	Frankston line	Carrum or Frankston		All stations	Services to Carrum only operate during morning peaks.	

== Transport links ==
Ventura Bus Lines operates one route via Parkdale station, under contract to Public Transport Victoria:

- 708 : Hampton station – Carrum station
