= Mordialloc railway station =

Railway station in Victoria, Australia

Mordialloc
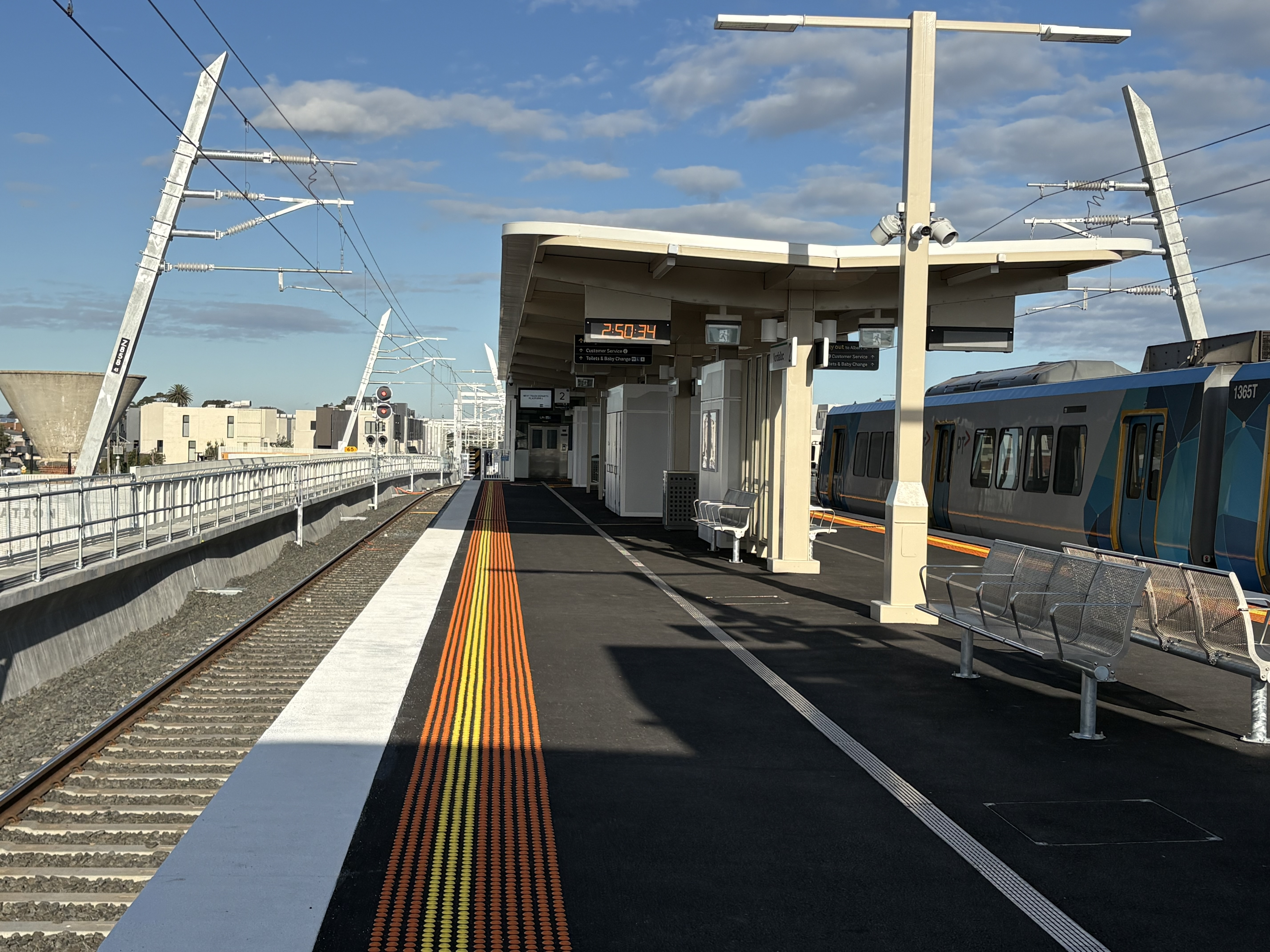
- Southbound view of the Platform 2, June 2026

General information
- Location: Albert Street, Mordialloc, Victoria 3195; City of Kingston; Australia
- Coordinates: 38°00′24″S 145°05′15″E
- System: PTV commuter rail station
- Owner: VicTrack
- Operator: Metro Trains
- Line: Frankston
- Distance: 27.69 kilometres from Southern Cross
- Platforms: 2 island
- Tracks: 2
- Connections: Bus; SkyBus (Stop temporarily closed)

Construction
- Structure type: Elevated
- Parking: 170
- Accessible: Yes

Other information
- Status: Operational, premium station
- Station code: MOR
- Fare zone: Myki zone 2
- Website: Public Transport Victoria

History
- Opened: 19 December 1881; 144 years ago
- Rebuilt: 21 May 2026 (LXRP)
- Electrified: June 1922 (1500 V DC overhead)

Passengers
- 2005–2006: 521,051
- 2006–2007: 550,998 ▲5.74%
- 2007–2008: 584,067 ▲6%
- 2008–2009: 661,392 ▲13.23%
- 2009–2010: 697,854 ▲5.51%
- 2010–2011: 711,318 ▲1.92%
- 2011–2012: 669,522 ▼5.87%
- 2012–2013: Not measured
- 2013–2014: 678,980 ▲1.41%
- 2014–2015: 711,742 ▲4.82%
- 2015–2016: 696,780 ▼2.1%
- 2016–2017: 669,344 ▼3.93%
- 2017–2018: 726,018 ▲8.46%
- 2018–2019: 755,531 ▲4.06%
- 2019–2020: 550,700 ▼27.11%
- 2020–2021: 339,550 ▼38.34%
- 2021–2022: 284,900 ▼16.09%
- 2022–2023: 416,750 ▲46.27%

Services
Preceding station	Metro Trains	Following station
Parkdale towards Flinders Street via City Loop	Frankston line	Aspendale towards Frankston
Track layout
Location

Mordialloc station is a railway station operated by Metro Trains Melbourne on the Frankston line, part of the Melbourne rail network. It serves the south-eastern suburb of Mordialloc, in Melbourne, Victoria, Australia. Mordialloc station is an elevated premium station, featuring one island platform with two faces. It opened on 19 December 1881. The station was rebuilt and elevated under the Level Crossing Removal Project, reopening on 21 May 2026.

Stabling facilities are located at the Frankston (down) end of the station with space to stable four trains.

The station precinct itself has a number of heritage buildings and elements, including the cottage style historic station buildings (1882 and 1887), and the last remaining example of an Edwardian–style railway water tower (1910) in Victoria, also known as a "Type H" water tower.

== History ==
Mordialloc station was officially opened on 19 December 1881 by Sir Thomas Bent, who was the Minister of Railways, and later becoming the Premier of Victoria between 1904 and 1909. The station was provided when the railway line from Caulfield was extended. It remained a terminus until 1 August 1882, when the line was extended to Frankston. Like the suburb itself, the station gets its name from an Indigenous word meaning 'near little sea', or from either a creek named Moodi or Marida.

The first train to arrive at Mordialloc was a special service from Princes Bridge, which collected school children from the Brighton area. Further specials occurred during the day, with proper timetabled services commencing the following day. Six services were provided upon opening and, apart from two services, all were shuttle services operating between Caulfield and Mordialloc.

When the line opened, none of the stations between Caulfield and Mordialloc had station buildings, as noted by a reporter for The Argus newspaper. However, it was also noted that the stations had sidings and platforms, with Mordialloc having a 'particularly fine and spacious platform'. In February 1882, a contract was let for the construction of station buildings, for a price of £749-15-0.

On 31 July of that year, the line was extended to Frankston, and again was opened by Sir Thomas Bent. Timetabled services commenced the following day, and were initially two daily services and three services on Saturday, connecting with city-bound trains at Mordialloc. By December of that year, through services were operating between the city and Mordialloc/Frankston, with the station itself open for goods traffic.

At the start of March 1885, a turntable and a coal stage and ash pit were provided. The turntable was relocated from Berwick, with the coal stage being a new construction. In December of that year, the Locomotive Branch of the Victorian Railways recommended the construction of an engine shed, at an estimated cost of £200. However, this did not eventuate.

In 1887, an additional siding was provided, and occurring in that year, a contract was let for extensions to the station building. By May of that year, the coal stage was relocated to Flinders Street and, by March 1889, a carriage dock was abolished, to allow an extension of the platform.

In 1888, duplication of the line was provided between Caulfield and Mordialloc. The Staff and Ticket, which worked between Mentone and Mordialloc, was abolished, and the Winters Block system was provided, with the section remaining Mentone–Mordialloc. By August 1890, there were seventeen services to Mordialloc, nine of which continued through to Frankston, and two goods trains. In March 1895, Mordialloc was interlocked, with a thirty lever frame provided.

On 22 March 1896, a new lattice girder bridge was provided over the Mordialloc Creek, which is located nearby in the down direction of the station, replacing the original timber bridge, which was to the east of the new bridge. Regrading occurred at the Up end of the station, with a railway overpass built over Nepean Road. That bridge was brought into use on 16 August of that year.

In December that year, the Commissioners of the Victorian Railways inspected the station, and announced a proposal to replace the existing frame with a signal box at the McDonald Street level crossing. This did not occur, however, alterations to the tracks and interlocking did occur in February 1898, and included two additional working levers for the frame. By 1901, there were six through services (five of which were services bound for Mornington or Stony Point), and ten services terminating. This gave Mordialloc a service roughly every hour throughout the day.

In 1907, a new engine shed was provided. It was originally erected at Traralgon in 1884, and was relocated to Briagolong in 1902, when a new shed at Traralgon was provided. The following year, a new signalbay and interlocking was provided. By that date, two dead–end sidings were in service at the Down end of the station.

In 1910, duplication of the line between Mordialloc and Frankston occurred, resulting in a rebuilt and enlarged yard and a complete overhaul to the station layout: a portion of a floating goods platform from Williamstown was erected by August 1 of that year, with instructions to reduce the length of the platform to 466 ft (142 m) also occurring. By December 1, a second platform (current day Platform 2) was provided. The signalling was also altered, allowing Down trains to use all three running tracks if necessary. A new goods road (No.4 road) was provided behind Platform 2 to the enlarged goods yard, which was now extended to Mordialloc Creek. A new engine shed and turntable were provided, as well as the current pedestrian underpass.

On 5 January 1911, a new, elevated signal box was provided adjacent to the Bear Street level crossing, complete with a fifty lever frame. By 1 March of that year, the Edwardian–style water tower was completed. By December 1913, there were seventeen through services and fourteen terminating services, with a number of goods trains to and from Frankston, Mornington Junction and Carrum (an as–required service only) also shunting in the yard at various hours of the day.

Electrification arrived at the station in May 1922, and was extended to Frankston in August of that year. The first trial run of an electric train to Mordialloc occurred on 19 May of that year, with electric services beginning three days later, on 22 May. A trial run to Frankston occurred on 21 August, with services commencing on 24 August. Electrification, however, brought little alterations to the station, apart from some minor signalling changes. By December 1924, there was thirty through services, twenty–four terminating services and three goods services. Two train sets also stabled overnight.

Sometime around 1924, the engine shed was abolished. The Victorian Railways' Chief Engineer of the Way & Works branch recommended it be relocated to Colac, but it is unsure if this happened. In February of the following year, the platforms were extended in the Up direction, to allow the operation of 7–car trains. In 1927, the former signalbay was removed, to allow improvements to the width of the platform. During November 1929, a number of roads in the yard were wired, allowing the use of electric locomotives on goods services.

On 28 December 1938, the grandstand of the nearby Epsom Racecourse was destroyed by fire, bringing an end to race traffic to Mordialloc. Prior to this, race specials were generally formed by 7–car Tait sets. Racehorses themselves were carried by train, with special services originating from Flemington Racecourse and the loading of the horses carried out at the Newmarket Stock Siding, Flinders Street and other stations as required. In early 1942, the water supply for steam locomotives was decommissioned, along with the water tower.

Post–World War II, suburbia was being extensively developed towards Mordialloc and beyond. By February 1950, there was fifty–one through services (a number of these services terminated at Aspendale), twenty–eight terminating services (with two sets stabling overnight) and a Monday–Wednesday–Friday goods service to and from Seaford, which shunted at Mordialloc twice on the days it operated.

Sometime between 1954 and 1956, the turntable in the yard was abolished. On 21 December 1955, a substation was provided near the Station Street level crossing, located in the Down direction of the station. It was provided to improve the power supply at the outer ends of suburban railway lines, allowing improved services.

Around 1961, the goods shed and platform were abolished. By May 1963, the station was serviced by sixty–three through services, with ten services that terminated, with five train sets stabling overnight. It was still served by the goods service to and from Seaford, however, this now only operated on Wednesdays.

Between 1964 and 1966, the current railway overpass crossing the Nepean Highway was provided, replacing the original 1896–built overpass. During 1967, there was consideration to extending Platform 2 to allow 8–car trains, which would've forced the relocation of a number of signal posts. However, a number of signal renewals did occur during this time. By November 1973, planning was underway for the extension of the third track from Caulfield to Mordialloc. This, however, has not eventuated: the third track was only extended to Moorabbin in 1987.

Automatic signalling between Mordialloc and Chelsea was provided in 1977. Between 1979 and 1982, a new concrete bridge was provided over the Mordialloc Creek, replacing the lattice girder bridge from 1896. By 1981, the goods yard was closed to traffic, and No.4 road was abolished and baulked on the Up side of the Bear Street level crossing, with the last recorded use of the road occurring when an Albury–bound passenger set was held during a shunters strike. By 1984, the overhead lines for No.4 road and the goods sidings were removed.

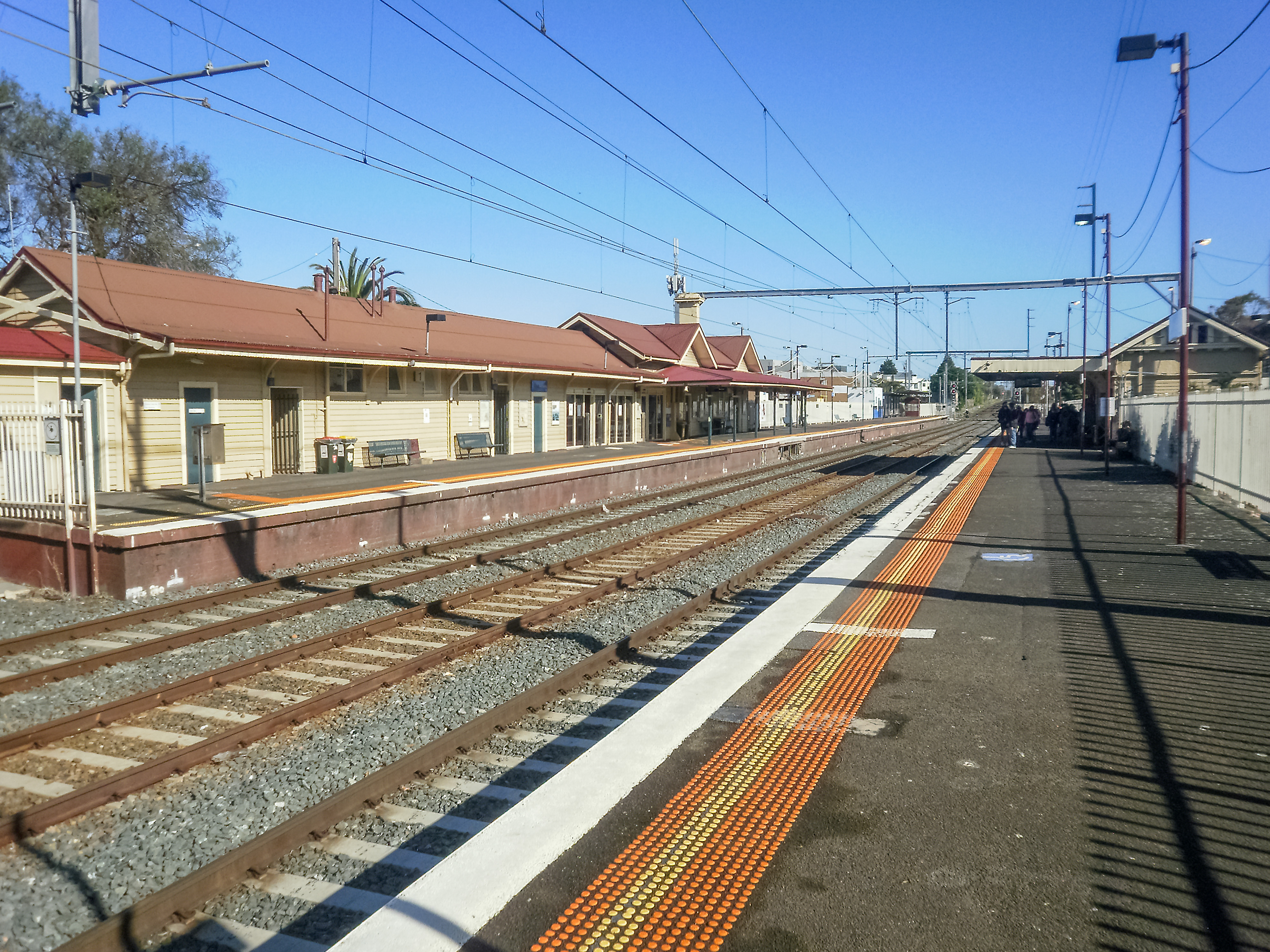
The former ground level station in October 2021

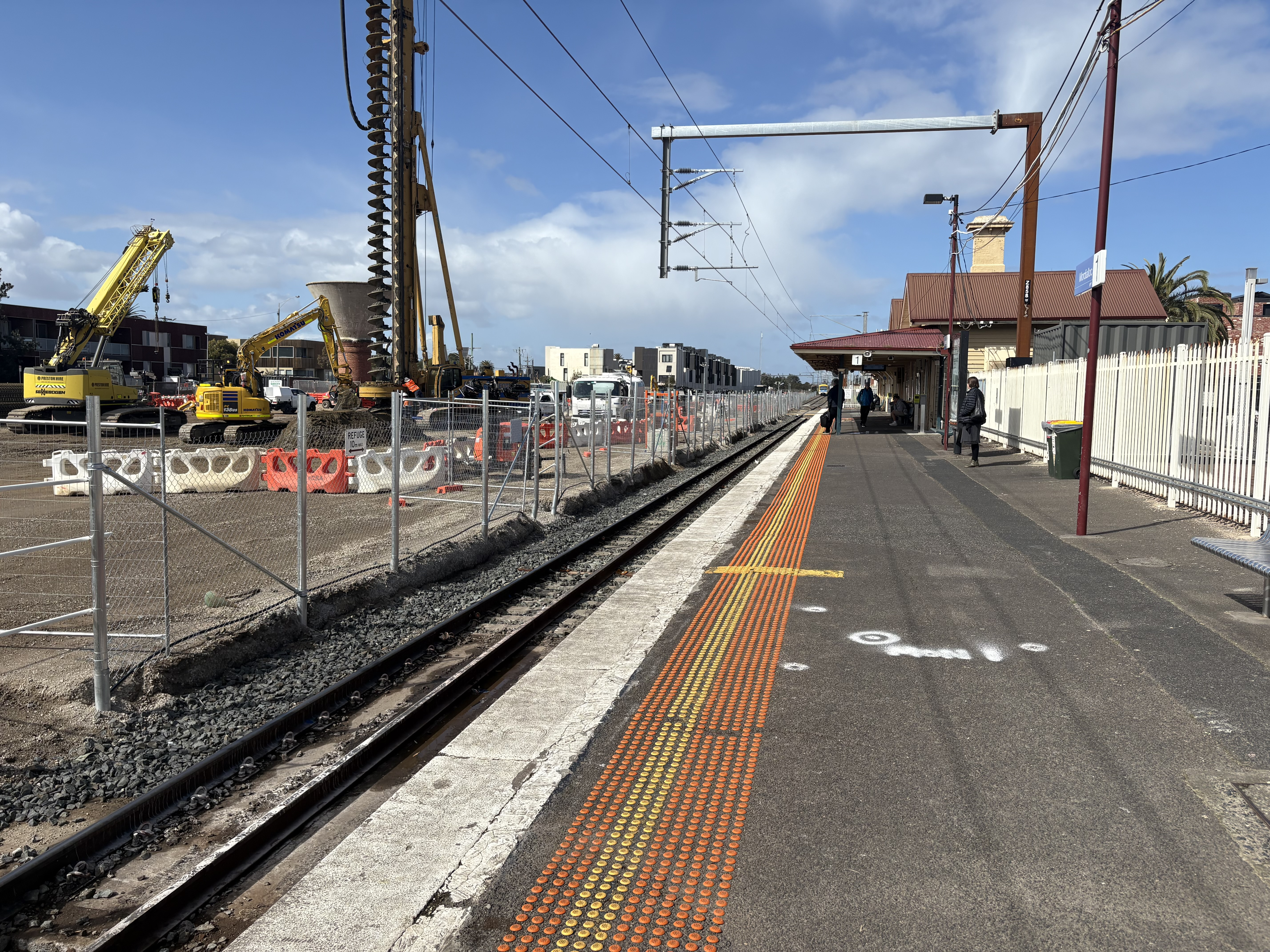
The station during grade separation works in August 2025

Three-position signalling replaced double line block signalling between Mordialloc and Parkdale in April 1986, this being the last section of double line block working on the Frankston line. Mordialloc, however, remained mechanically interlocked. This all changed in the following year, 1987: the elevated signal box was abolished, and was replaced with a signal panel that was located in the main station building on Platform 1. Boom barriers were provided at both the McDonald Street and Bear Street level crossings, located in the up and down directions of the station respectively, and all semaphore signals were replaced with three position signals. In June 1988, the elevated signal box was demolished.

In 1990, security fencing was provided for the stabling yard. On 5 December 1995, Mordialloc was upgraded to a premium station.

In early 2011, the stabling yard was upgraded. On 9 September 2013, whilst travelling through the McDonald Street level crossing, a wagon on the Long Island steel train derailed, causing lengthy delays. In October 2015, new accessible toilets were provided at the station.

On 7 October 2021, the signal panel was abolished, with control transferred to the Kananook Signal Control Centre.

On 9 October 2022, the Andrews government announced that the McDonald Street and Bear Street level crossings would be removed by 2028, along with five other level crossings on the Frankston line, it was fast tracked for removal in June 2023 projected for 2026. The designs for the new station was announced in June 2024 and will be elevated and the station to feature an island platform, the plans also show that the heritage building on Platform 2 to be kept and Bear Street to be closed off as part of the level crossing removal and McDonald Street to remain open. On the 4th of August 2025, the Bear Street level crossing was permanently closed to road traffic. On the 18th of August 2025, Platform 2 was closed and subsequently demolished to allow for the construction of the new elevated station with the stabling sidings being temporarily disconnected from the mainline, until the railway reopened on the elevated viaduct. Until the 18th of August 2025, select trains during the weekday peak hour would terminate and originate from the station.

On 27 February 2026, it was announced by the Level Crossing Removal Project that the old Mordialloc station would close on 30 April 2026 alongside the removal of the McDonald Street level crossing and the new station opening on 21 May 2026.

== Platforms and services ==
Mordialloc has two platforms in an Island arrangement. It is serviced by Metro Trains' Frankston line services.

Mordialloc platform arrangement
Platform	Line	Destination	Via	Service Type	Source
1	Frankston line	Flinders Street	City Loop	All stations and limited express services	
2	Frankston line	Carrum or Frankston		All stations	

== Transport links ==
Kinetic Melbourne operates one SmartBus route via Mordialloc station, under contract to Public Transport Victoria:

- SmartBus 903 : Altona station – Mordialloc

Ventura Bus Lines operates four routes via Mordialloc station, under contract to Public Transport Victoria:

- 705 : to Springvale station (peak-hour only)
- 706 : Mordialloc – Chelsea station (off-peak only)
- 708 : Hampton station – Carrum station
- 709 : to Noble Park station

SkyBus also operates a service to Melbourne Airport via Mordialloc station.
