= Patterson railway station =

Railway station in Melbourne, Australia

Patterson
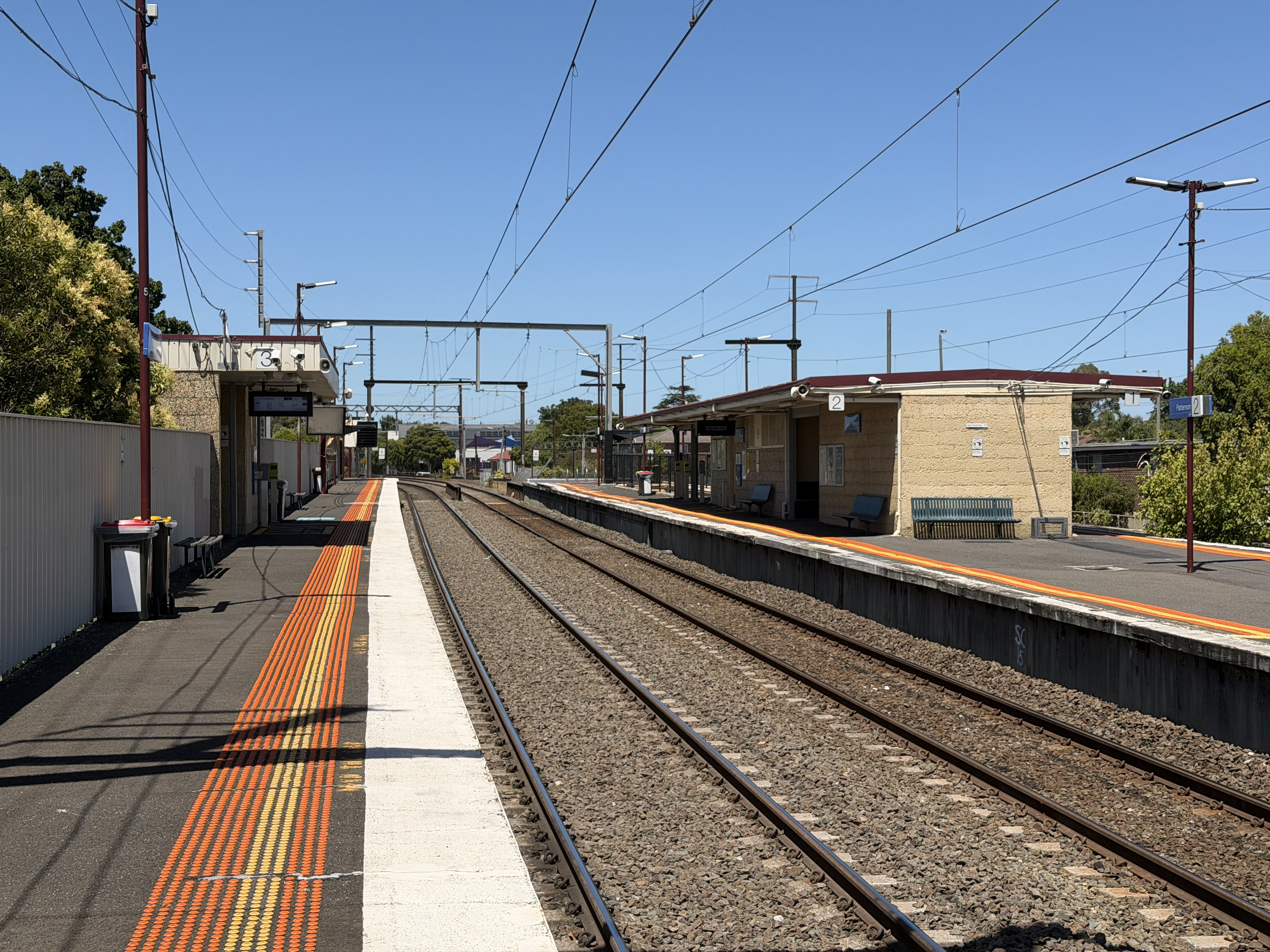
- Southbound view from Platform 3, January 2026

General information
- Location: North Avenue, Bentleigh, Victoria 3204; City of Glen Eira; Australia
- Coordinates: 37°55′29″S 145°02′07″E
- System: PTV commuter rail station
- Owner: VicTrack
- Operator: Metro Trains
- Line: Frankston
- Distance: 17.39 kilometres from Southern Cross
- Platforms: 3 (1 side, 1 island)
- Tracks: 3

Construction
- Structure type: Elevated
- Parking: 48
- Cycle facilities: Yes
- Accessible: Yes—step free access

Other information
- Status: Operational, unstaffed
- Station code: PAT
- Fare zone: Myki zone 1/2
- Website: Public Transport Victoria

History
- Opened: 28 May 1961; 65 years ago
- Rebuilt: 28 June 1987
- Electrified: June 1922 (1500 V DC overhead)

Passengers
- 2005-2006: 162,671
- 2006-2007: 178,895 ▲9.97%
- 2007-2008: 209,178 ▲16.92%
- 2008-2009: 225,000 ▲7.56%
- 2009-2010: 238,000 ▲5.78%
- 2010-2011: 243,606 ▲2.35%
- 2011-2012: 243,577 ▼0.011%
- 2012-2013: Not measured
- 2013-2014: 211,000 ▼13.37%
- 2014-2015: 247,530 ▲17.31%
- 2015-2016: 307,635 ▲24.28%
- 2016-2017: 313,551 ▲1.92%
- 2017-2018: 357,657 ▲14.07%
- 2018-2019: 354,250 ▼0.95%
- 2019-2020: 249,700 ▼29.5%
- 2020-2021: 127,150 ▼49.1%
- 2021–2022: 144,800 ▲13.88%

Services
Preceding station	Metro Trains	Following station
Bentleigh towards Flinders Street via City Loop	Frankston line	Moorabbin towards Frankston
Track layout
Location

Patterson station is a railway station operated by Metro Trains Melbourne on the Frankston line, part of the Melbourne rail network. It serves the south-eastern suburb of Bentleigh, in Melbourne, Victoria, Australia.

Patterson station is a ground level unstaffed station, featuring three platforms, an island platform with two faces and one side platform. It opened on 28 May 1961, with the current station provided in 1987. While the station had been proposed in 1930s demands from local residents intensified throughout the 1950s.

Named after Patterson Road, which is located immediately south of the station and also provides access, construction of the station commenced in 1958. An island platform was provided, and provision made for another platform face on the eastern side of the station. A photo taken by Weston Langford^{(1941-2014)} on the day prior to the official opening clearly shows the new "middle" line about to be connected (see below), and the easternmost line removed shortly afterwards. There was also a signal box located at the eastern side (down line) that has since been removed. On 28 June 1987, a third track was provided between Caulfield and Moorabbin, and platform 3 was constructed on the eastern side.

On 17 December 1994, a deliberately lit fire damaged parts of the station.

== Platforms and services ==
Patterson has one island platform with two faces and one side platform. It is serviced by Metro Trains' Frankston line services.

Patterson platform arrangement
Platform	Line	Destination	Via	Service Type	Notes	Source
1	Frankston line	Flinders Street	City Loop	All stations and limited express services		
2	Frankston line				Services may occasionally stop at this platform. Peak hour services run express through this station.	
3	Frankston line	Frankston, Cheltenham or Carrum		All stations		

== Art installation ==
In 2011, Pamela Irving curated a mosaic installation named Stationary Faces, consisting of a collage of various mosaic portraits. This project was funded by government department Arts Victoria (now Creative Victoria) and VicTrack, and was developed in collaboration with an estimate of 750 school students and youth services from Australia and abroad, inspired by Irving's mosaic works.

Stationary Faces was proposed by Irving in order to combat constant vandalism in the station's underpass, with the assistance of Rob Hudson, the Victorian parliament member for Bentleigh at the time. Irving's aims with the project were two-fold; to contribute to a "cultural sprawl" alongside the city of Melbourne's urban sprawl, and to use recycled/donated tiles and ceramics for environmental sustainability.

== Gallery ==
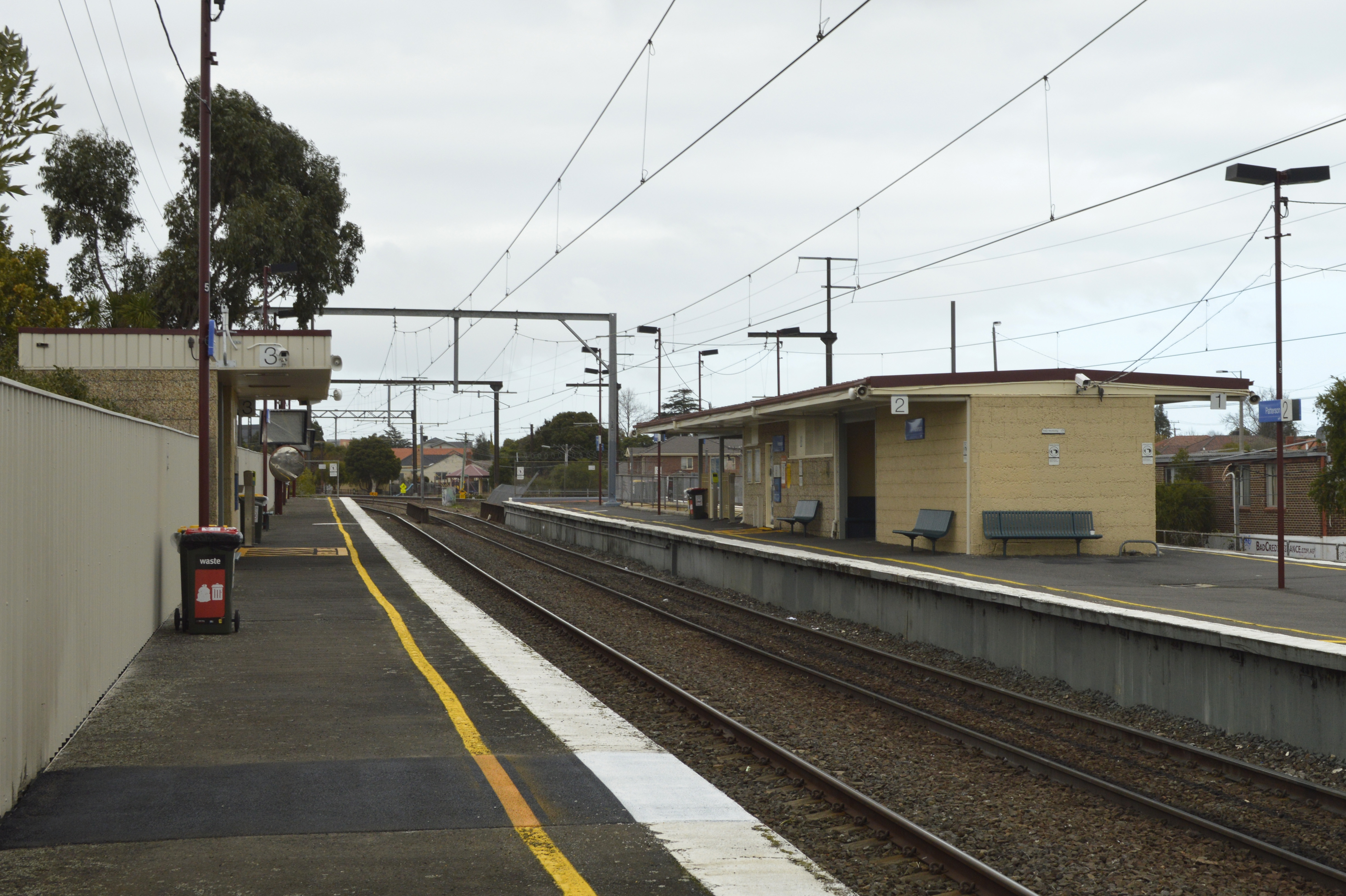
Southbound view from Platform 3, June 2014

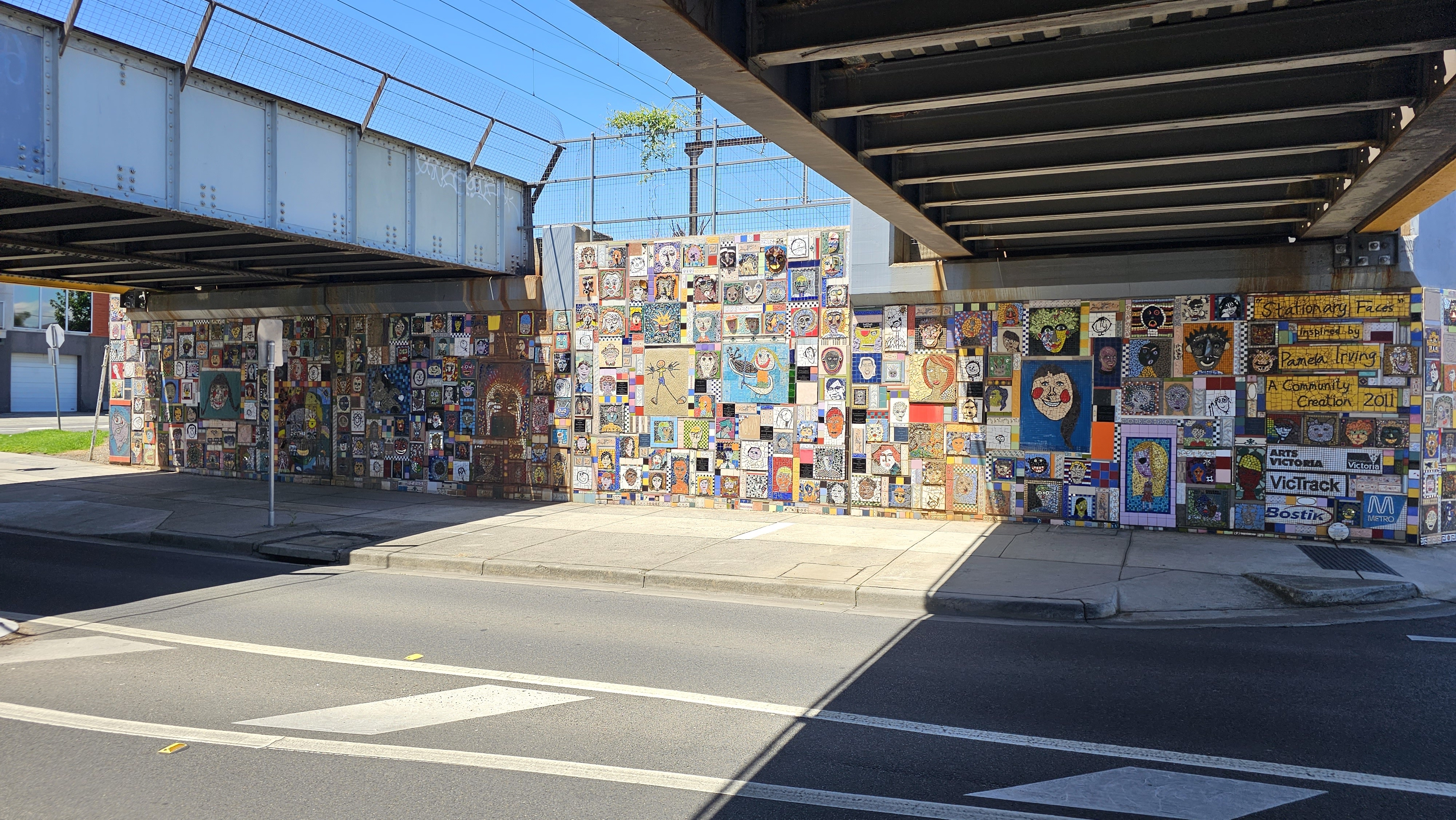
Art installation under the staton's rail corridor bridge
