= Moorabbin railway station =

Railway station in Melbourne, Australia

Moorabbin
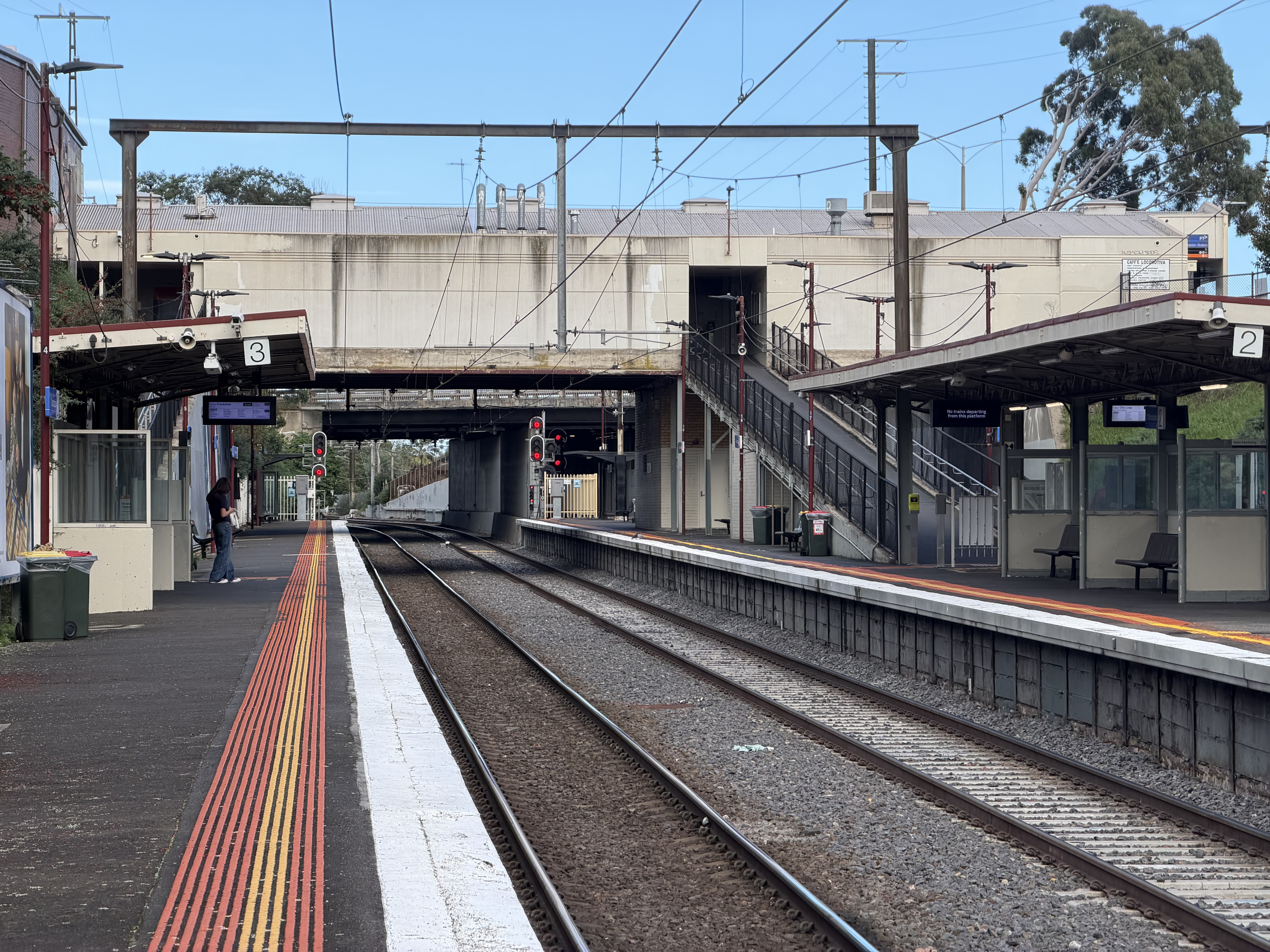
- Southbound view from Platform 3, June 2026

General information
- Location: Station Street, Moorabbin, Victoria 3189; City of Kingston; Australia
- Coordinates: 37°56′03″S 145°02′12″E
- System: PTV commuter rail station
- Owner: VicTrack
- Operator: Metro Trains
- Line: Frankston
- Distance: 18.45 kilometres from Southern Cross
- Platforms: 3 (1 side, 1 island)
- Tracks: 3
- Connections: Bus

Construction
- Structure type: Below ground
- Parking: 30
- Cycle facilities: Yes
- Accessible: No—steep ramp

Other information
- Status: Operational, premium station
- Station code: MRN
- Fare zone: Myki zone 2
- Website: Public Transport Victoria

History
- Opened: 19 December 1881; 144 years ago
- Rebuilt: 21 December 1958
- Electrified: June 1922 (1500 V DC overhead)
- Former names: South Brighton (1881–1907)

Passengers
- 2005–2006: 572,244
- 2006–2007: 612,893 ▲7.1%
- 2007–2008: 691,473 ▲12.82%
- 2008–2009: 715,000 ▲3.4%
- 2009–2010: 737,000 ▲3.08%
- 2010–2011: 756,000 ▲2.58%
- 2011–2012: 713,000 ▼5.69%
- 2012–2013: Not measured
- 2013–2014: 548,000 ▼23.14%
- 2014–2015: 565,228 ▲3.14%
- 2015–2016: 690,666 ▲22.19%
- 2016–2017: 665,930 ▼3.58%
- 2017–2018: 744,514 ▲11.8%
- 2018–2019: 717,700 ▼3.6%
- 2019–2020: 671,250 ▼6.47%
- 2020–2021: 300,700 ▼55.2%
- 2021–2022: 322,300 ▲7.18%

Services
Preceding station	Metro Trains	Following station
Patterson towards Flinders Street via City Loop	Frankston line	Highett towards Frankston
Track layout
Location

Moorabbin station is a railway station operated by Metro Trains Melbourne on the Frankston line, part of the Melbourne rail network. It serves the south-eastern suburb of Moorabbin, in Melbourne, Victoria, Australia. Moorabbin station is a ground-level premium station, featuring three platforms, an island platform with two faces and one side platform. It opened on 19 December 1881, with the current station provided in 1958.

Initially opened as South Brighton, the station was given its current name of Moorabbin on 1 May 1907.

== History ==
Moorabbin station opened on 19 December 1881, when the railway line from Caulfield was extended to Mordialloc. Like the suburb itself, the station's name was derived from an Indigenous word meaning 'mother's milk'.

In 1957, the station was closed to goods traffic. In that same year, former sidings "A" and "B" were booked out of use. In late 1958, the original station was relocated and placed in a deep cutting, coinciding with the construction of road overpasses for South Road and the Nepean Highway. At that time, provision was made for a third platform on the eastern side of the cutting.

In the late 1960s, the private Masaga Group (later known as Hanover Holdings) entered into an agreement with the Victorian Government to build a modern double-story retail concourse above the station platforms. In exchange, the developers were guaranteed a long-term lease of the site which they then sublet to local retailers and businesses.

On 28 June 1987, the third platform finally came into use, when a third track from Caulfield was provided.

During the early hours of 6 December 1994, a fire destroyed all shops in the concourse. The concourse was rebuilt and new shops were constructed. In 1998, Moorabbin was upgraded to a premium station.

In 2014, the Station Street entrance and the bus interchange was re-built, as part of an upgrade program on the Frankston line.

== Platforms and services ==
Moorabbin has one island platform with two faces, and one side platform. All platforms are accessible from the concourse via a ramp. The concourse contains a ticket office, toilets and shops.

Until 2023, in the morning peak-hour, Frankston-bound services used Platform 3, with Flinders Street-bound services using Platforms 1 and 2. At other times, Frankston-bound trains used Platform 2. Two morning peak-hour services from Flinders Street terminated at Moorabbin and return to the city.

Following the re-construction of Glen Huntly station in July 2023, Frankston-bound services use Platform 3, while Platform 2 is not regularly used and non-stopping express trains pass the platform in the peak hour.

It is serviced by Metro Trains' Frankston line services.

Moorabbin platform arrangement
Platform	Line	Destination	Via	Service Type	Source
1	Frankston line	Flinders Street	City Loop	All stations and limited express services	
2	Frankston line	Flinders Street	City Loop	Select all stations services	
2	Frankston line	Frankston		Select all stations services	
3	Frankston line	Cheltenham, Mordialloc, Carrum or Frankston		All stations	

== Transport links ==
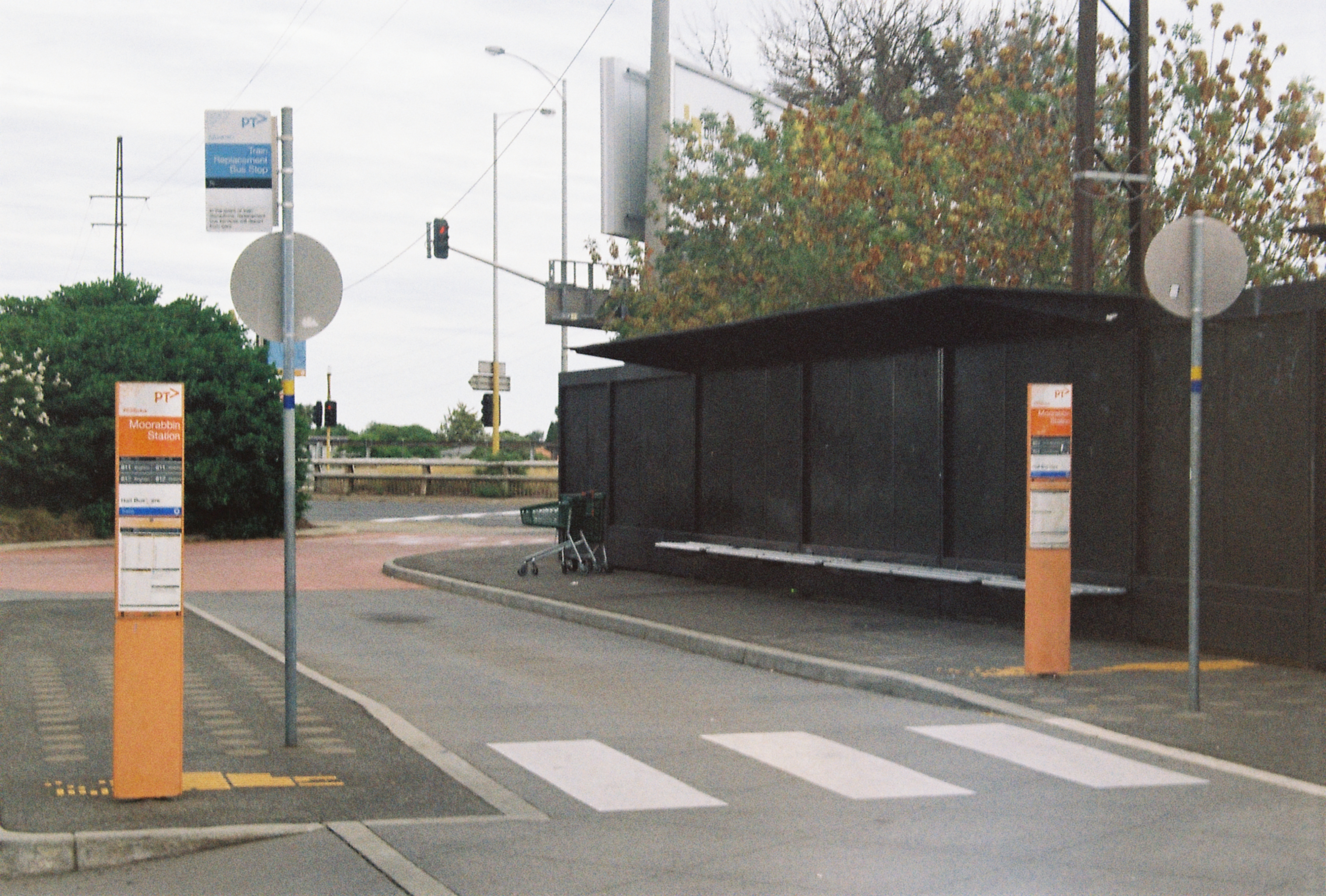
Bus stop

with two faces, and one side platform. All platforms are accessible from the concourse via a ramp. The concourse contains a ticket office, toilets and shops.

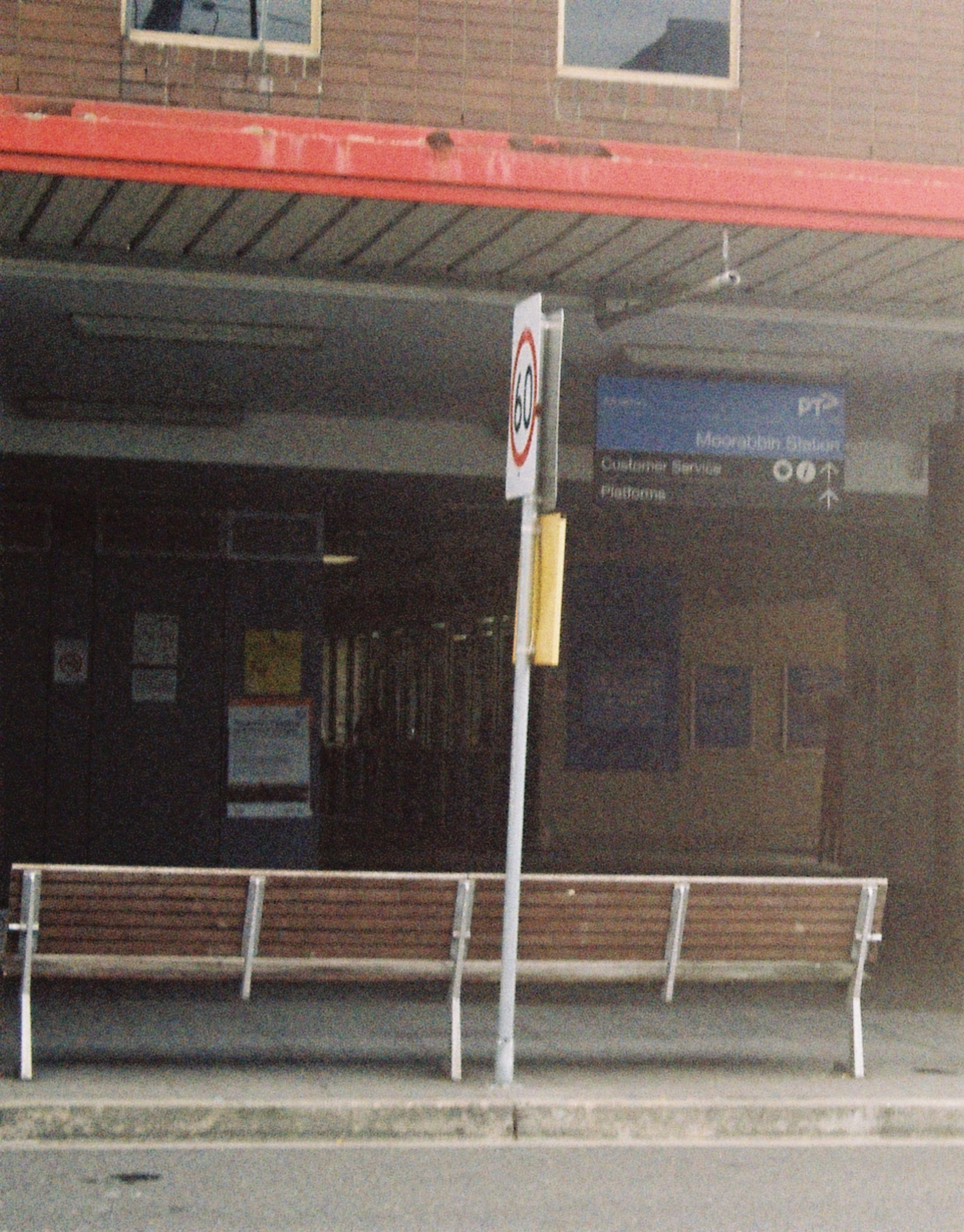
Station entrance

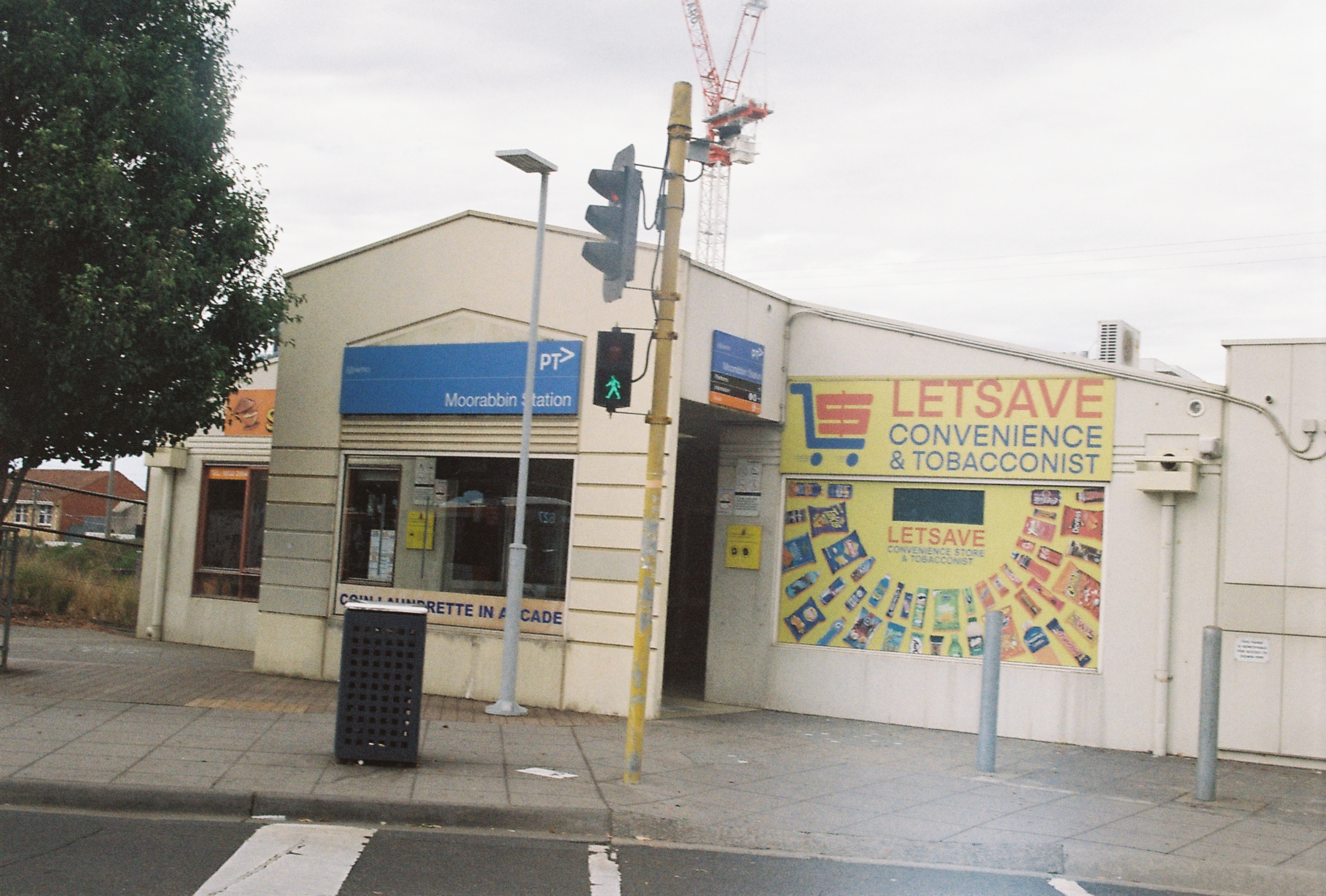
Station entrance

Ventura Bus Lines operates six routes via Moorabbin station, under contract to Public Transport Victoria:

- 627 : to Chadstone Shopping Centre
- 811 : Dandenong station – Brighton
- 812 : Dandenong station – Brighton
- 823 : North Brighton station – Westfield Southland
- 824 : to Parkmore Shopping Centre
- 825 : to Westfield Southland

== Gallery ==
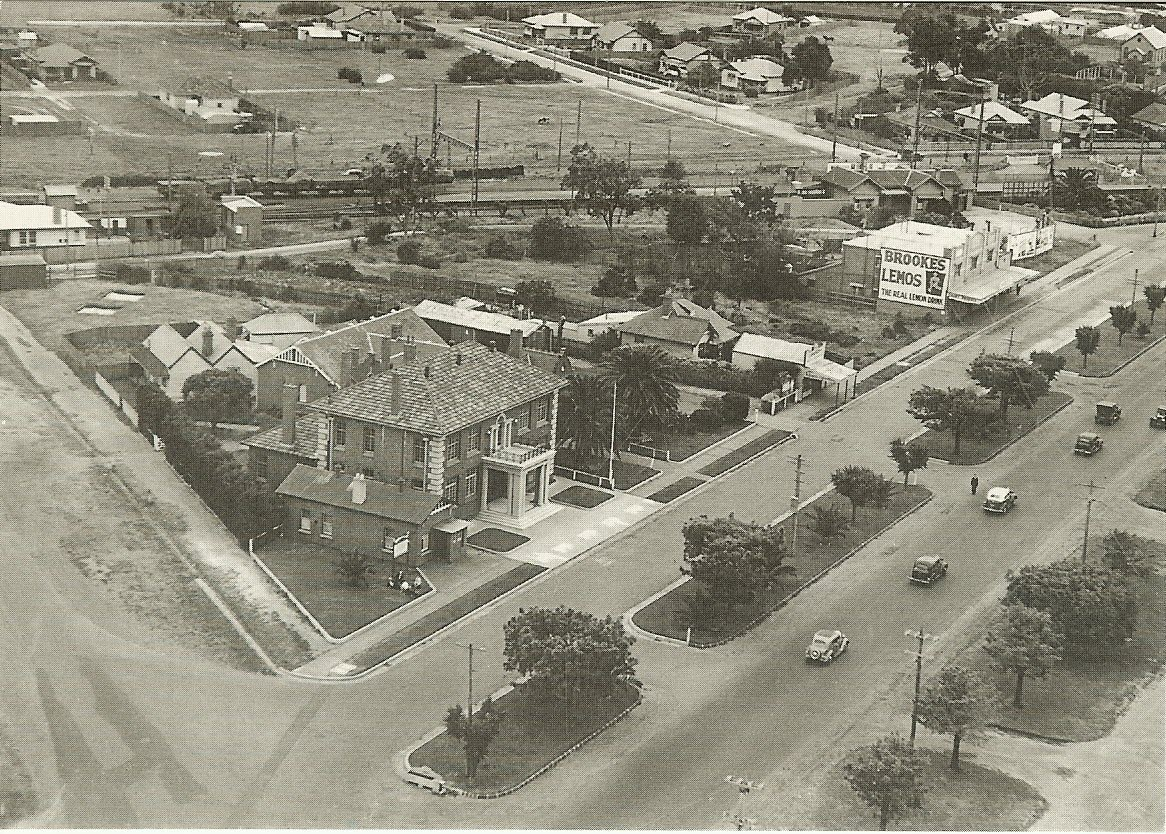
Aerial view of the station (at upper right), looking south-east, 1930

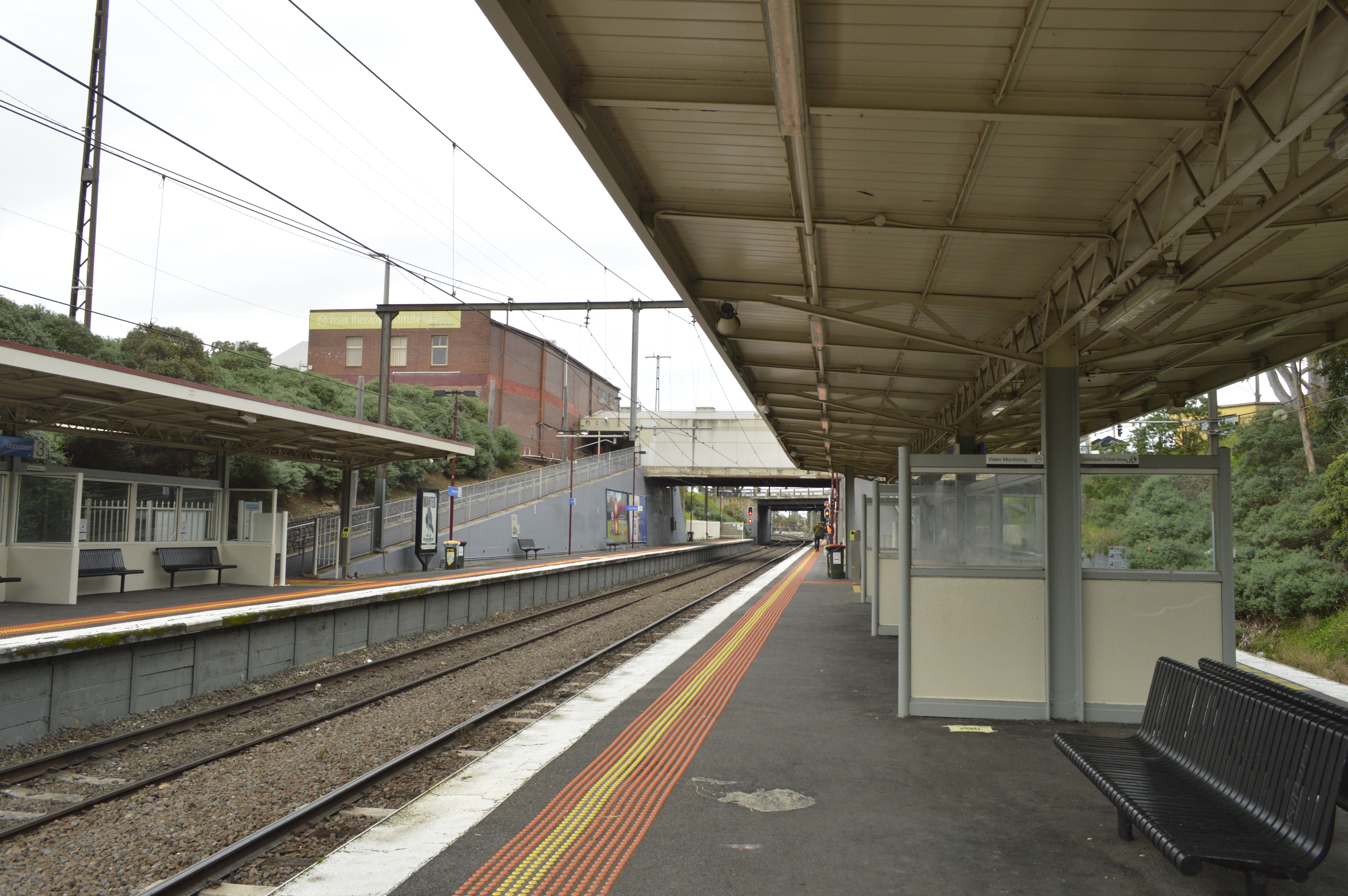
Southbound view from Platform 2, June 2014

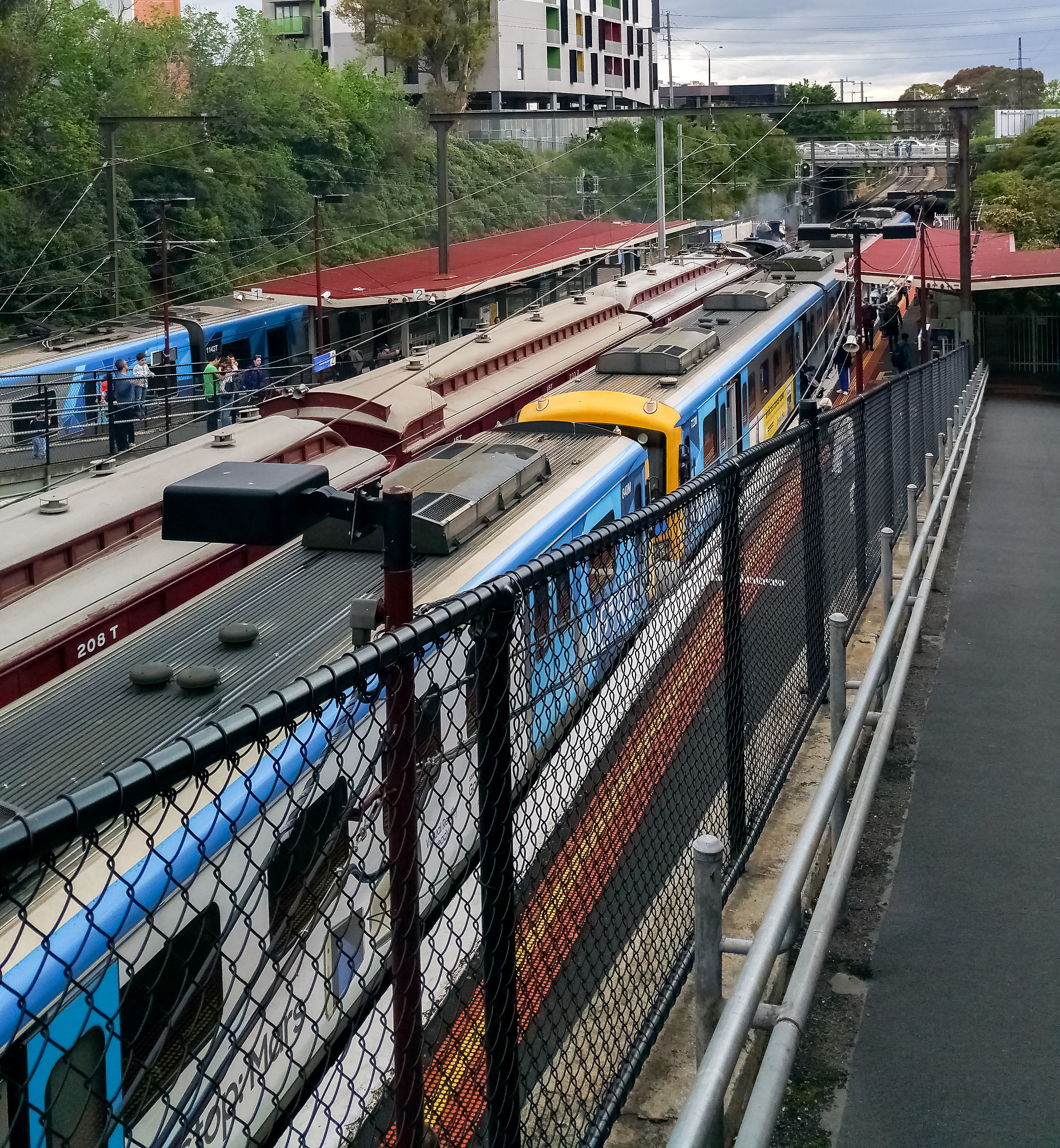
A rare sight: three trains at Moorabbin during the Family Fun Day, November 2016
