= Seaford railway station, Melbourne =

Railway station in Melbourne, Australia

Seaford
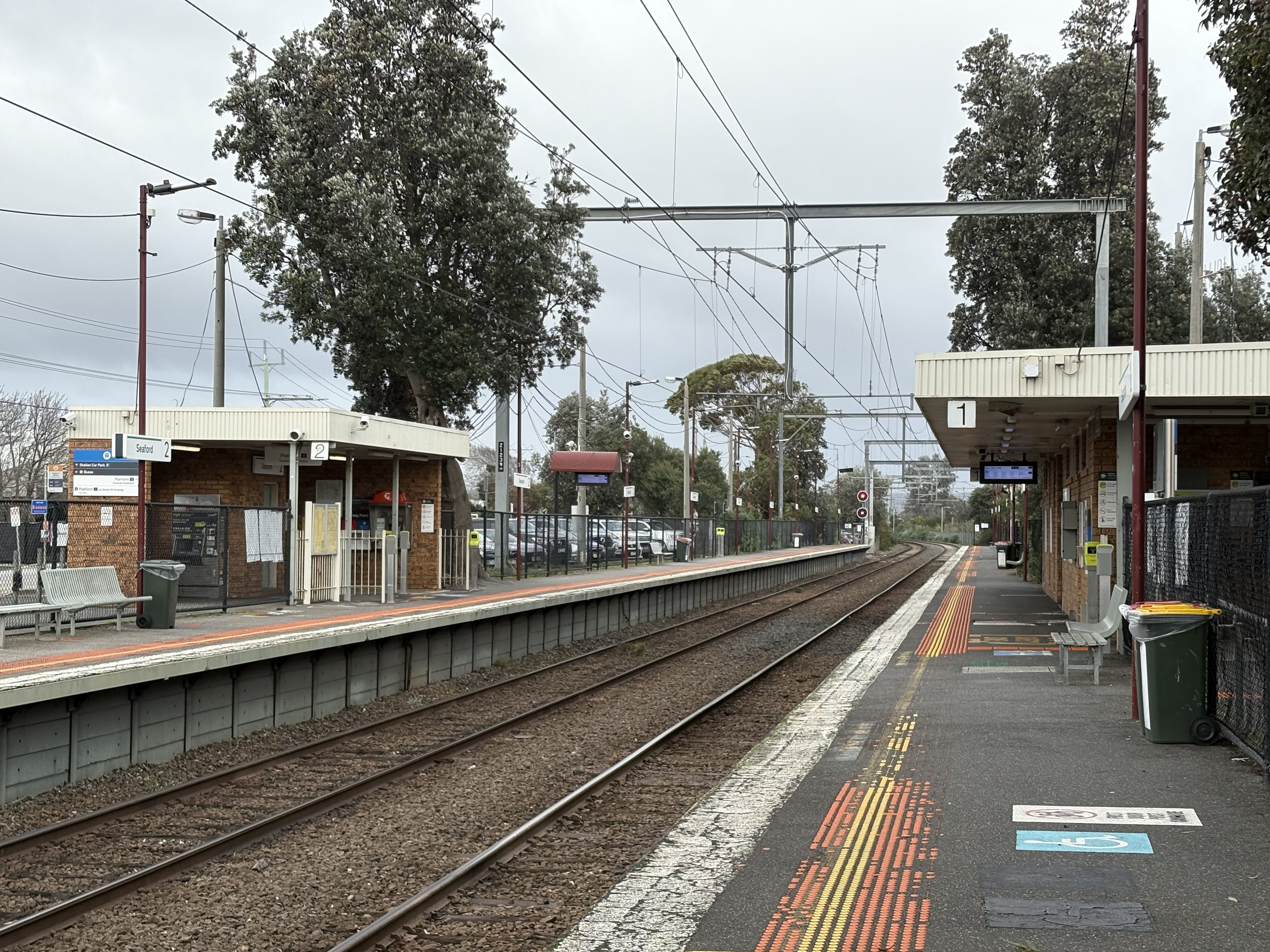
- Southbound view from Platform 1, July 2026

General information
- Location: Railway Parade, Seaford, Victoria 3198; City of Frankston; Australia
- Coordinates: 38°06′14″S 145°07′41″E
- System: PTV commuter rail station
- Owner: VicTrack
- Operator: Metro Trains
- Line: Frankston
- Distance: 39.35 kilometres from Southern Cross
- Platforms: 2 side
- Tracks: 2
- Connections: Bus

Construction
- Structure type: Ground
- Parking: 300
- Cycle facilities: 8
- Accessible: Yes — step free access

Other information
- Status: Operational, unstaffed
- Station code: SEA
- Fare zone: Myki zone 2
- Website: Public Transport Victoria

History
- Opened: 1 December 1913; 112 years ago
- Rebuilt: 1979
- Electrified: August 1922 (1500 V DC overhead)

Passengers
- 2005–2006: 337,733
- 2006–2007: 387,601 ▲14.76%
- 2007–2008: 482,125 ▲24.38%
- 2008–2009: 528,442 ▲9.6%
- 2009–2010: 512,597 ▼2.99%
- 2010–2011: 501,874 ▼2.09%
- 2011–2012: 499,181 ▼0.53%
- 2012–2013: Not measured
- 2013–2014: 447,906 ▼10.27%
- 2014–2015: 426,687 ▼4.73%
- 2015–2016: 422,938 ▼0.87%
- 2016–2017: 413,563 ▼2.21%
- 2017–2018: 379,112 ▼8.33%
- 2018–2019: 374,133 ▼1.31%
- 2019–2020: 317,100 ▼15.24%
- 2020–2021: 154,500 ▼51.27%
- 2021–2022: 162,550 ▲5.21%
- 2022–2023: 279,000 ▲71.63%

Services
Preceding station	Metro Trains	Following station
Carrum towards Flinders Street via City Loop	Frankston line	Kananook towards Frankston
Track layout
Location

Seaford station is a railway station operated by Metro Trains Melbourne on the Frankston line, part of the Melbourne rail network. It serves the south-eastern suburb of Seaford, in Melbourne, Victoria, Australia. Seaford station is a ground-level unstaffed station, featuring two side platforms. It opened on 1 December 1913, with the current station buildings provided in 1979.

A substation is located at the northern (up) end of the station.

== History ==
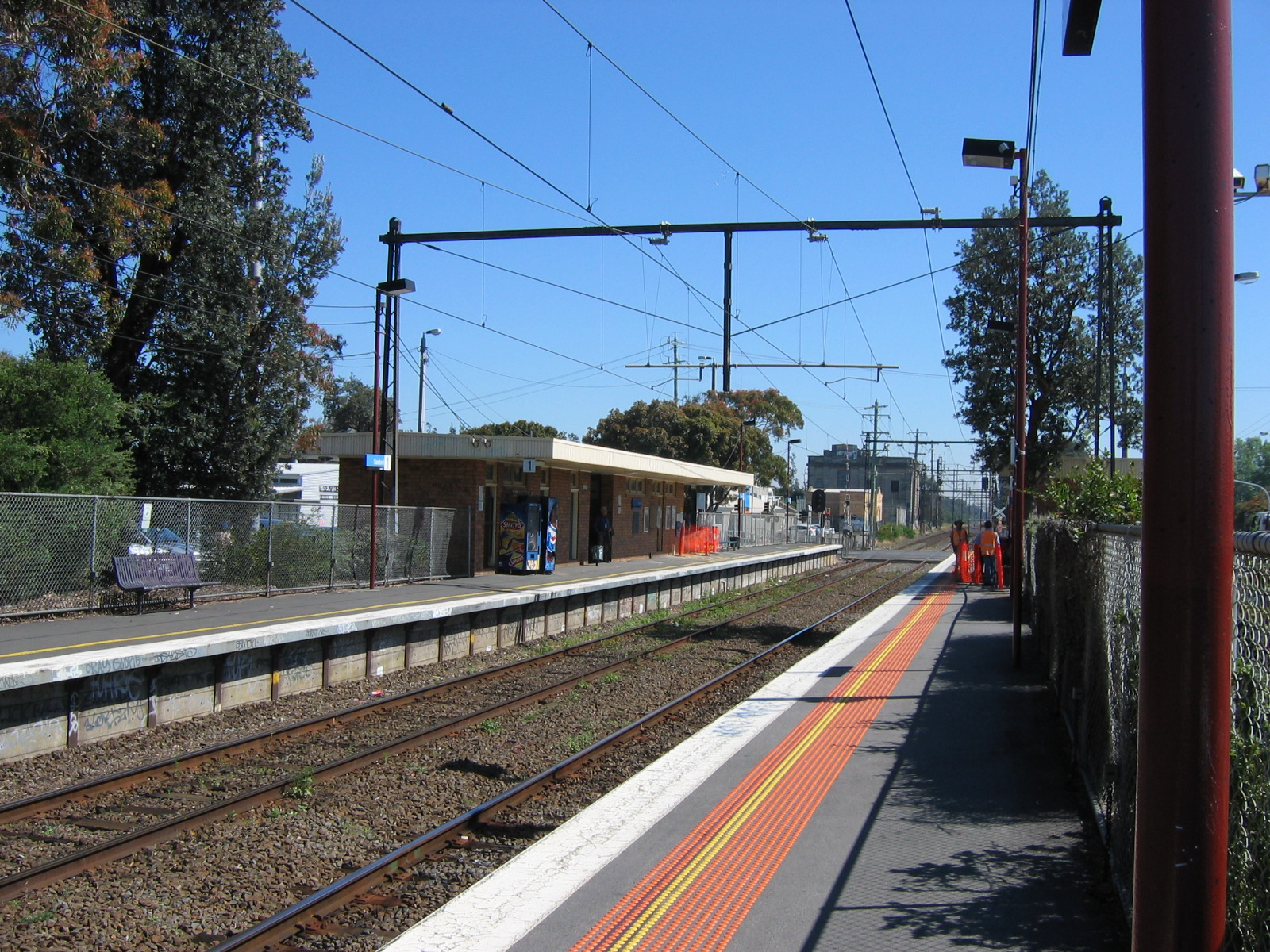
Overview of the platforms at Seaford station, showing station building on Platform 1 and Station Street level crossing located north of the station, November 2007

Like the suburb itself, Seaford station is named after the English town of Sleaford, Lincolnshire. The name was suggested by local councillor Sydney Plowman, who was originally from Sleaford.

On 13 November 1957, an electric locomotive shunting in the yard derailed, blocking both lines for almost two hours.

Just before 18:00 on 5 June 1968, Tait trailer carriages 336T and 307T were damaged by fire while stabled near the station.

In 1976, boom barriers replaced interlocked gates at the Station Street level crossing, located at the up end of the station. On 4 February 1979, Tait motor carriage 288M was destroyed by fire while stabled near the station. Also in that year, the current station buildings were provided.

During the 1970s and 1980s, the station used to accommodate stabled trains at its sidings. That was discontinued during the late 1980s due to costs and graffiti attacks. By December 1985, the goods yard at the station had been closed to traffic.

In April 2002, the signal box and a crossover at the station were abolished. In 2009, the car park nearest to Platform 2 was extended.

As part of the 2010/2011 State Budget, $83.7 million was allocated to upgrade Seaford to a premium station, along with nineteen others. However, that was scrapped by the Baillieu Government in March 2011.

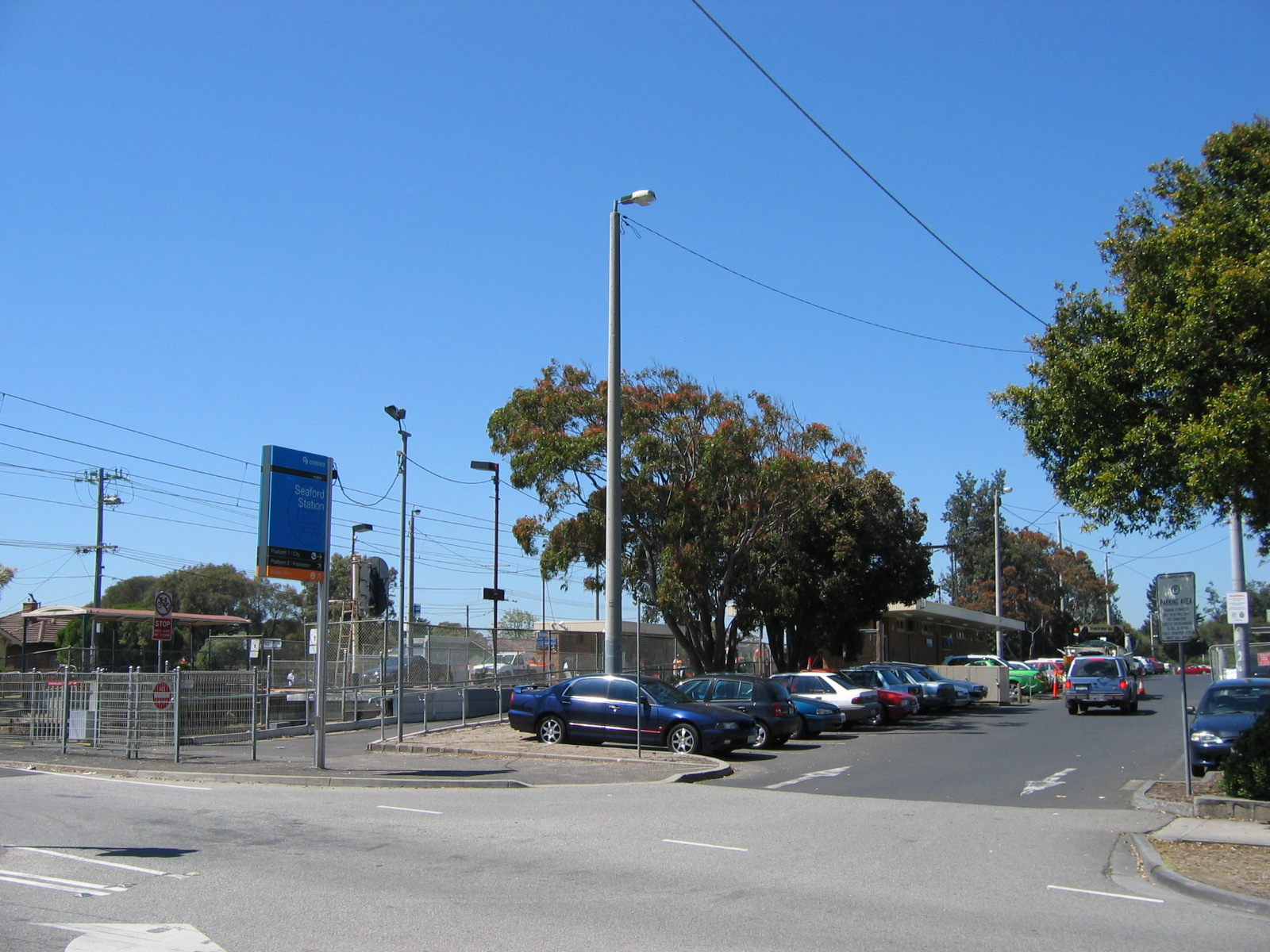
The station carpark was due to get an upgrade as of the 2019 commitment, but was ultimately scrapped by the same government in 2021.

Following a 2019 commitment by the Morrison government, the station was due to receive an upgraded passenger car park. However, that was scrapped by the same government in 2021.

Under the Level Crossing Removal Project, Seaford station will be rebuilt and elevated as part of eliminating nearby level crossings. The rebuilding of the station was initially planned for completion in 2029, but was later fast tracked for completion by 2028.

On 11 May 2026, the Level Crossing Removal Project announced early designs for the new elevated Seaford station. The early designs of the new elevated Seaford station features an island platform, stairs, entrance and a lift on both the northern and southern sides of the station, landscaped open spaces built under the elevated bridge, new walking and cycling tracks linked to the Kananook Creek Trail and designs of the elevated rail bridge to be inspired by the coastline and sand dunes.

== Platforms and services ==
Seaford has two side platforms. It is served by Frankston line trains.

Seaford platform arrangement
Platform	Line	Destination	Via	Service Type	Source
1	Frankston line	Flinders Street	City Loop	All stations and limited express services	
2	Frankston line	Frankston		All stations	

== Transport links ==
Ventura Bus Lines operates two routes via Seaford station, under contract to Public Transport Victoria:

- 760 : to Cranbourne station
- 780 : Frankston station – Carrum station
