= Kananook railway station =

Railway station in Melbourne, Australia

Kananook
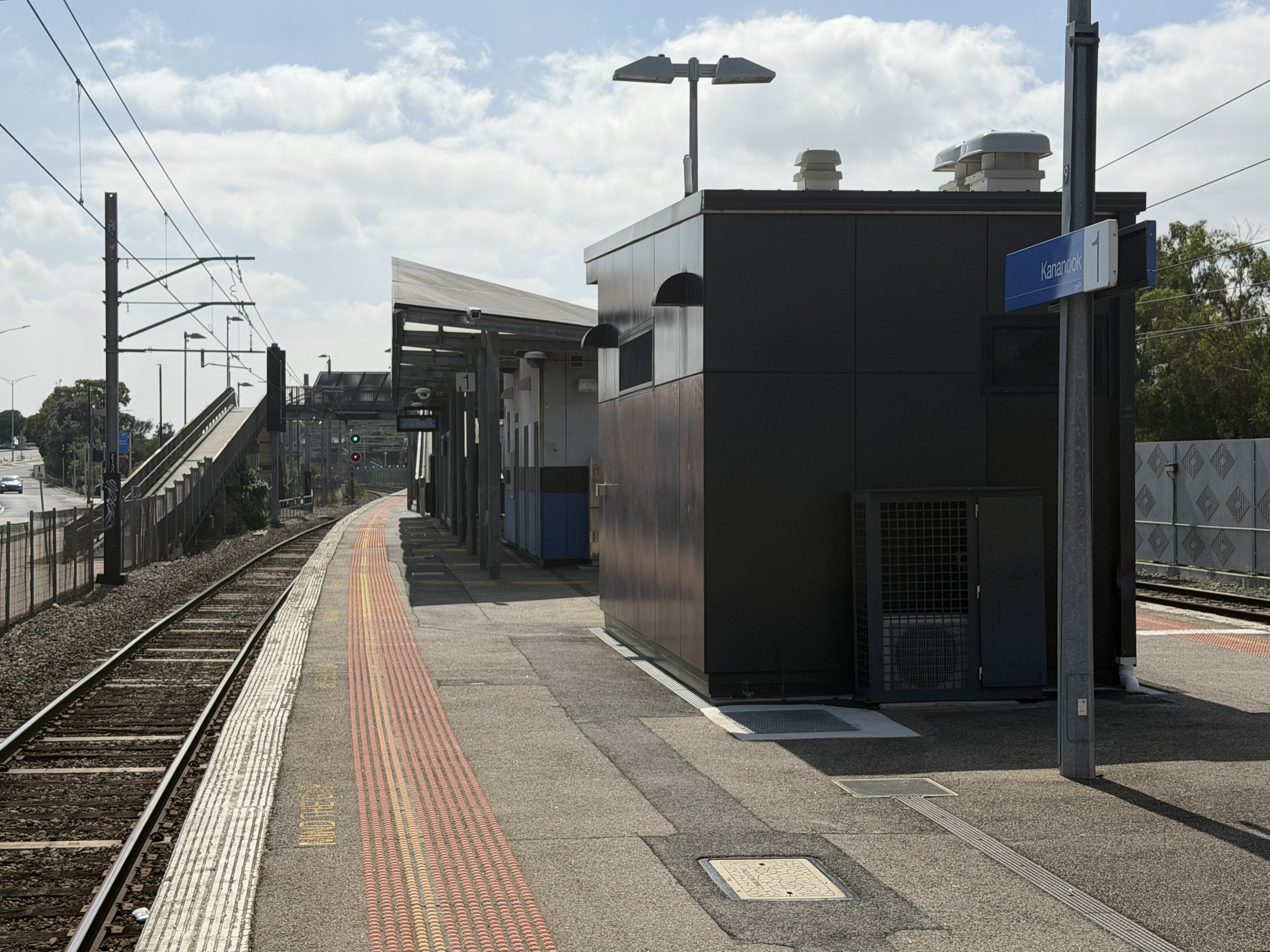
- Northbound view from Platform 1, March 2026

General information
- Location: Wells Road, Seaford, Victoria 3198; City of Frankston; Australia
- Coordinates: 38°07′18″S 145°08′07″E
- System: PTV commuter rail station
- Owner: VicTrack
- Operator: Metro Trains
- Line: Frankston
- Distance: 41.44 kilometres from Southern Cross
- Platforms: 2 (1 island)
- Tracks: 3
- Connections: Bus

Construction
- Structure type: Ground
- Parking: 136
- Cycle facilities: Yes
- Accessible: Yes—step free access

Other information
- Status: Operational, unstaffed
- Station code: KAN
- Fare zone: Myki zone 2
- Website: Public Transport Victoria

History
- Opened: 25 August 1975; 51 years ago
- Rebuilt: 2007
- Electrified: August 1922 (1500 V DC overhead)

Passengers
- 2005–2006: 219,697
- 2006–2007: 227,901 ▲3.73%
- 2007–2008: 300,410 ▲31.81%
- 2008–2009: 320,455 ▲6.67%
- 2009–2010: 311,036 ▼2.93%
- 2010–2011: 315,252 ▲1.35%
- 2011–2012: 312,609 ▼0.83%
- 2012–2013: Not measured
- 2013–2014: 331,244 ▲5.96%
- 2014–2015: 318,445 ▼3.86%
- 2015–2016: 326,583 ▲2.55%
- 2016–2017: 319,873 ▼2.05%
- 2017–2018: 294,379 ▼7.97%
- 2018–2019: 295,914 ▲0.52%
- 2019–2020: 186,150 ▼37.09%
- 2020–2021: 92,700 ▼50.2%
- 2021–2022: 93,400 ▲0.75%
- 2022–2023: 155,800 ▲66.8%

Services
Preceding station	Metro Trains	Following station
Seaford towards Flinders Street via City Loop	Frankston line	Frankston Terminus
Track layout
Location

Kananook station is a railway station operated by Metro Trains Melbourne on the Frankston line, part of the Melbourne rail network. It serves the south-eastern suburb of Seaford, in Melbourne, Victoria, Australia. It was opened on 25 August 1975, with the current station building provided in 2007.

== History ==
Kananook station is named after the nearby Kananook Creek. In March 1974, to allow for the building of the station, the existing up and down lines were slewed. At the same time, the Klauer Street overpass, at the up end of the station, was provided, replacing the Wells Road level crossing.

In 1991, parts of the station were upgraded, including the pedestrian overpass and car park.

The station was featured in the first episode of the television series Sensing Murder, which aired on Network Ten in September 2004.

In 2007, upgrades to the station were carried out, as part of the EastLink road project, which linked Ringwood to Frankston. The original station building, of fibro construction, was at the centre of the station, with two semi-enclosed waiting areas on the platforms and a disused booking office near the station entrance. The building was demolished and replaced with a shelter, and a noise-protection wall was constructed.

To the north of the station is the Kananook Train Storage Facility, which was opened in May 2020.

== Platforms and services ==
Kananook has one island platform with two faces and is served by Frankston line trains.

Kananook platform arrangement
Platform	Line	Destination	Via	Service Type	Source
1	Frankston line	Flinders Street	City Loop	All stations and limited express services	
2	Frankston line	Frankston		All stations	

== Transport links ==
Kinetic Melbourne operates one SmartBus route via Kananook station, under contract to Public Transport Victoria:

- SmartBus 901 : Frankston station – Melbourne Airport

Ventura Bus Lines operates three routes via Kananook station, under contract to Public Transport Victoria:

- 778 : to Carrum Downs
- 779 : Frankston station – Belvedere Park Primary School (Seaford)
- 832 : Frankston station – Carrum Downs
