= Carrum railway station =

Railway station in Carrum, Melbourne, Victoria, Australia

Carrum
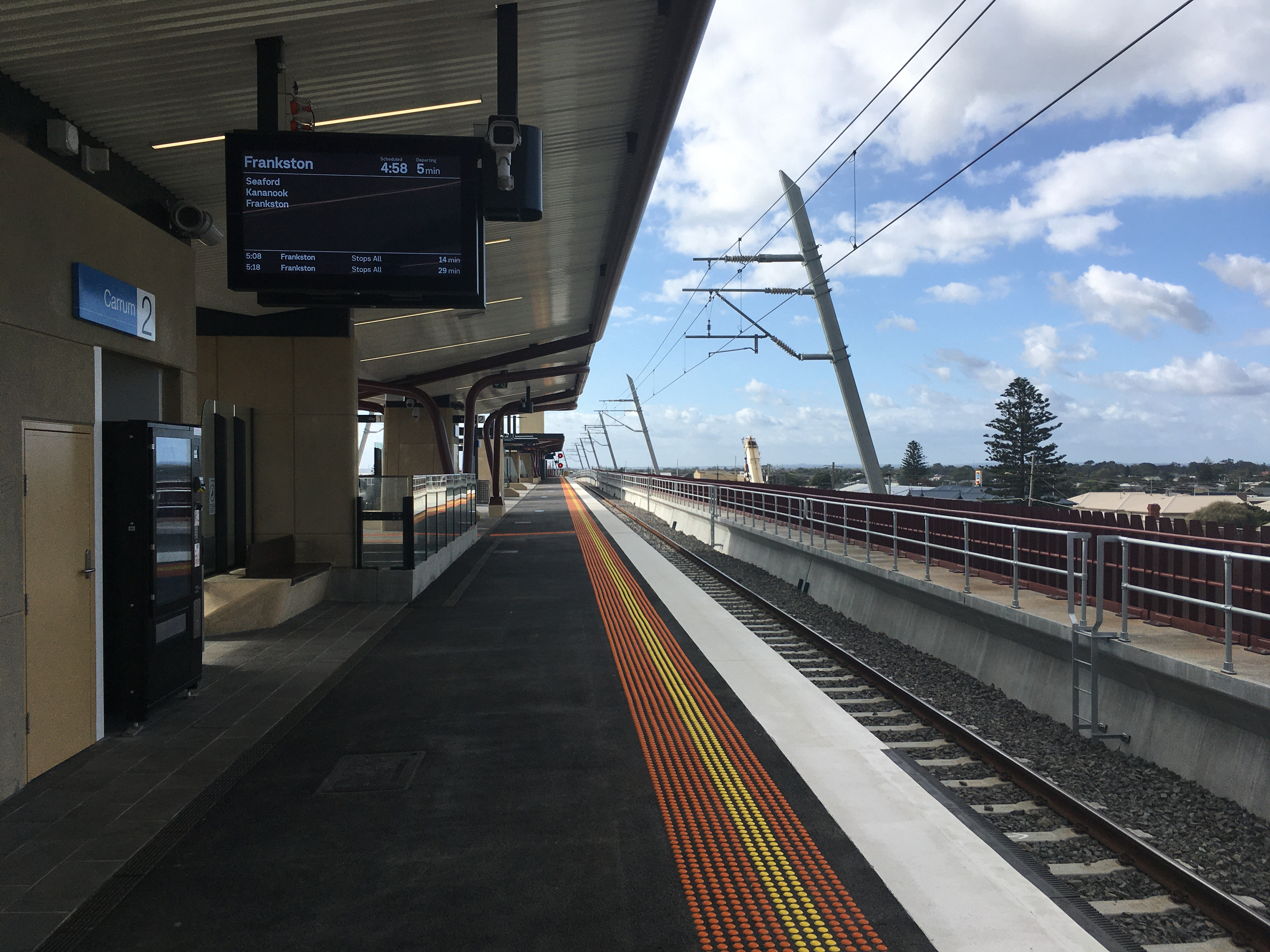
- Northbound view from Platform 2, March 2020

General information
- Location: Nepean Highway, Carrum, Victoria 3197; City of Kingston; Australia
- Coordinates: 38°04′30″S 145°07′20″E
- System: PTV commuter rail station
- Owner: VicTrack
- Operator: Metro Trains
- Line: Frankston
- Distance: 36.10 kilometres from Southern Cross
- Platforms: 2 (1 island)
- Tracks: 2
- Connections: Bus

Construction
- Structure type: Elevated
- Parking: 100
- Cycle facilities: Yes
- Accessible: Yes—step free access

Other information
- Status: Operational, premium station
- Station code: CAR
- Fare zone: Myki zone 2
- Website: Public Transport Victoria

History
- Opened: 1 August 1882; 144 years ago
- Rebuilt: 17 February 2020 (LXRP)
- Electrified: August 1922 (1500 V DC overhead)

Passengers
- 2005–2006: 438,140
- 2006–2007: 439,120 ▲0.22%
- 2007–2008: 476,323 ▲8.47%
- 2008–2009: 559,610 ▲17.48%
- 2009–2010: 538,610 ▼3.75%
- 2010–2011: 528,317 ▼1.91%
- 2011–2012: 513,756 ▼2.75%
- 2012–2013: Not measured
- 2013–2014: 439,131 ▼14.52%
- 2014–2015: 403,974 ▼8%
- 2015–2016: 403,445 ▼0.13%
- 2016–2017: 395,726 ▼1.91%
- 2017–2018: 630,330 ▲59.28%
- 2018–2019: 430,394 ▼31.71%
- 2019–2020: 41,600 ▼90.33%
- 2020–2021: 157,950 ▲279.69%
- 2021–2022: 182,150 ▲15.32%
- 2022–2023: 281,800 ▲54.7%
- 2023–2024: 322,800 ▲14.55%
- 2024–2025: 343,700 ▲6.47%

Services
Preceding station	Metro Trains	Following station
Bonbeach towards Flinders Street via City Loop	Frankston line	Seaford towards Frankston
Track layout
Location

Carrum station is a railway station operated by Metro Trains Melbourne on the Frankston line, part of the Melbourne rail network. It serves the south-eastern suburb of Carrum, in Melbourne, Victoria, Australia. Carrum station is an elevated premium station, featuring an island platform. It opened on 1 August 1882, with the current station provided in February 2020.

== History ==
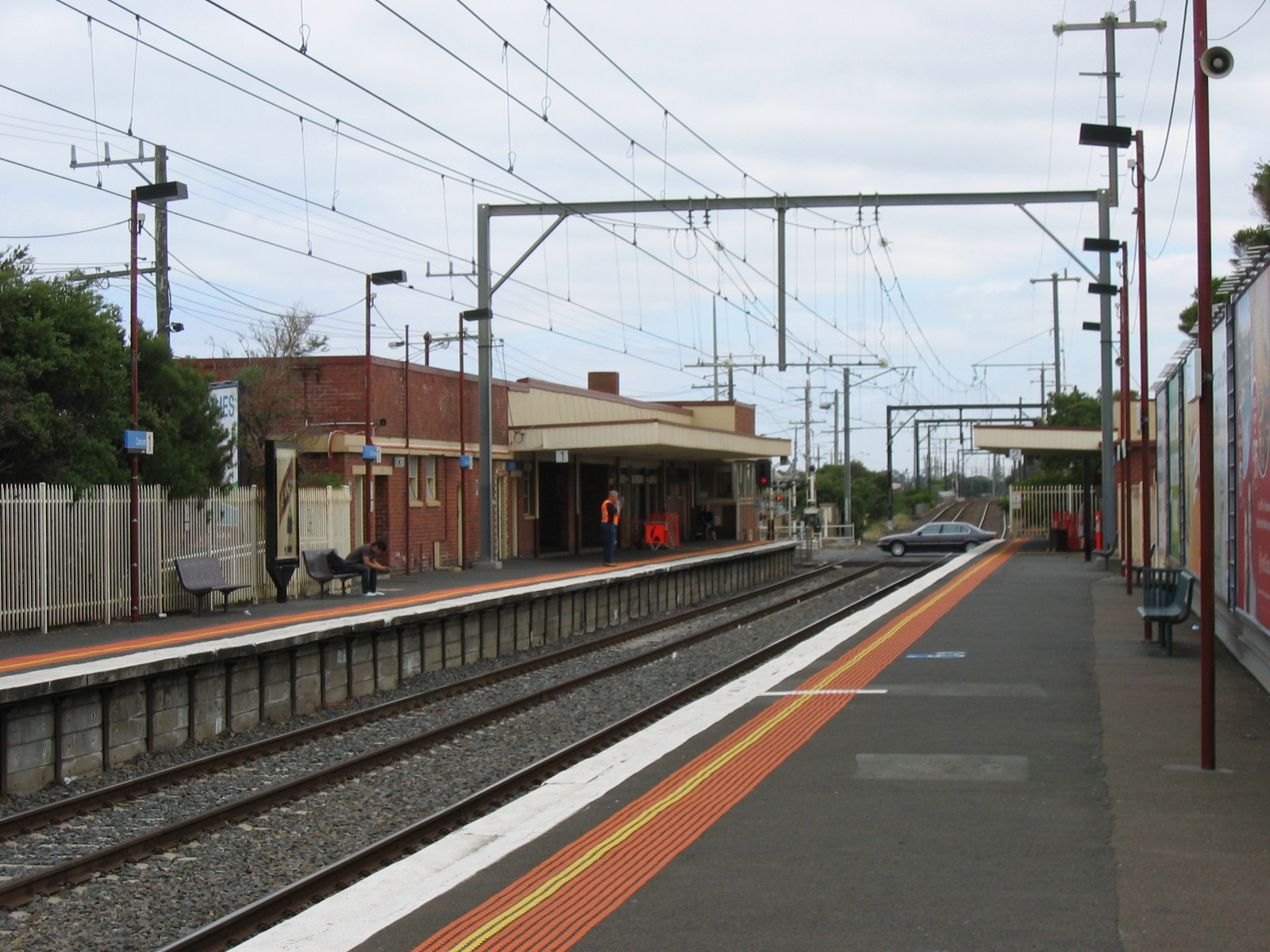
Northbound view from the former ground level Platform 2, November 2007

Carrum station opened on 1 August 1882, when the railway line from Mordialloc was extended to Frankston. Like the suburb itself, the station was named after the nearby Carrum Swamp, the name believed to be derived from an Indigenous word describing a boomerang.

In 1947, interlocked gates were installed at the former Station Street level crossing, which was located at the up end of the station, and was the last installation of interlocking gates in Victoria. In 1977, boom barriers replaced these gates.

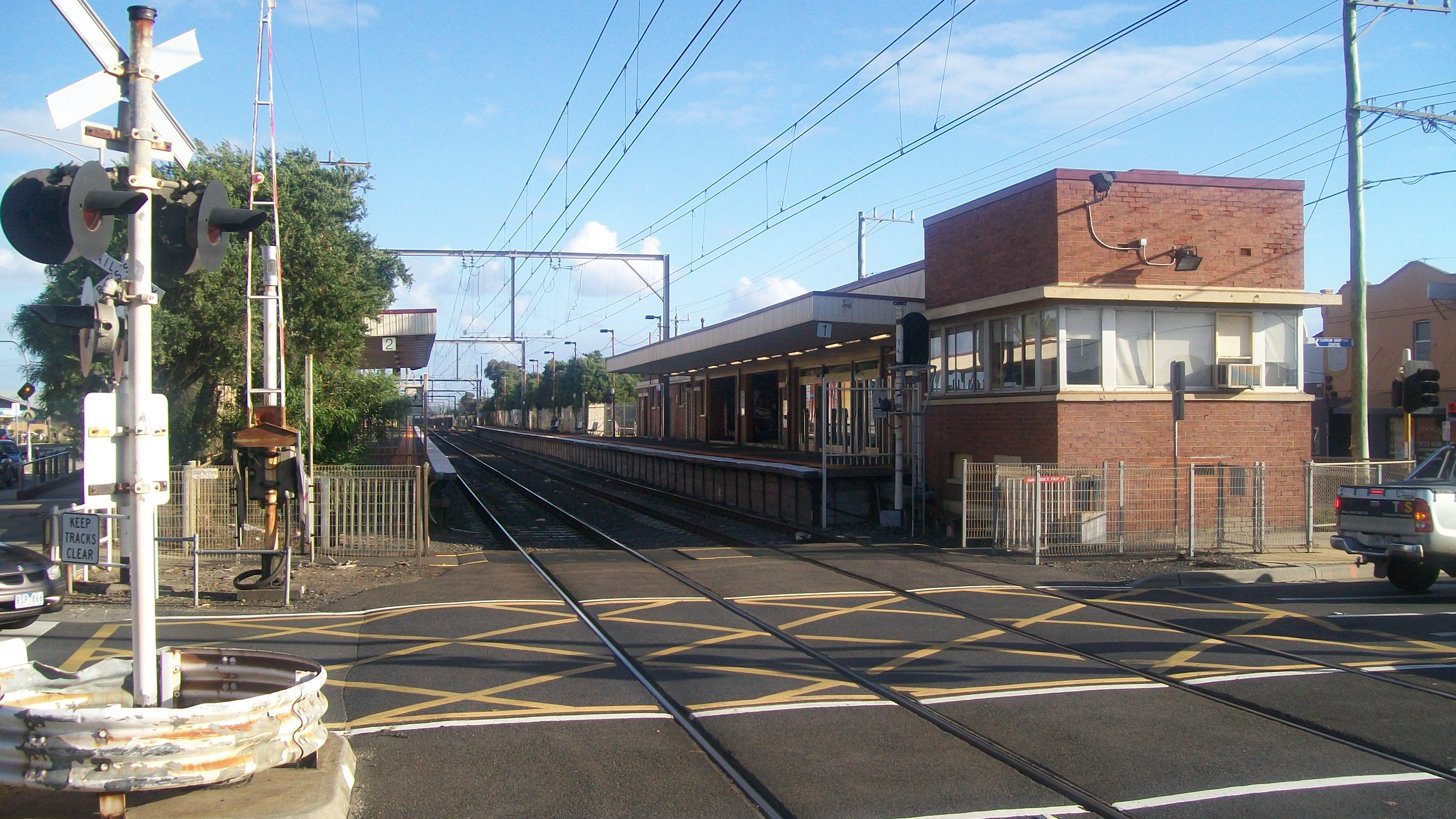
Southbound view from the former Station Street level crossing, March 2010

In 1988, siding "A" and the goods platform was abolished, as well as the connection from siding "B" to the mainline.

Approximately 100 metres south of the station was a stabling yard that could hold a number of trains. The yard, which was provided in October 1990, was replaced due to the level crossing removal works, being relocated to Kananook in May 2020.

On 20 December 1995, Carrum was upgraded to a premium station. In October 2015, additional shelters were provided, along with an upgrade of the toilets on the former ground level Platform 1.

A signal box was located on the former ground level Platform 1, controlling a crossover which allowed trains to terminate and either return or shunt into the stabling yard. In 1976, the interlocked frame at the signal box was abolished, and was replaced by a control panel. On 20 July 2019, the signal box was abolished.

During 2019–2020, the station was rebuilt as part of the Level Crossing Removal Project. On 17 May 2019, the Station Street level crossing was abolished, and was followed by the closure of the station in the early hours of 6 July of that year, with a small number of enthusiasts witnessing the last services to arrive and depart. The station buildings were demolished shortly afterwards. On 17 February 2020, a new elevated rail line and station opened.

== Platforms and services ==
Carrum has one island platform with two faces. It is served by Frankston line trains.

Carrum platform arrangement
Platform	Line	Destination	Via	Service Type	Source
1	Frankston line	Flinders Street	City Loop	All stations and limited express services	
2	Frankston line	Frankston		All stations	

== Transport links ==
Ventura Bus Lines operates four routes via Carrum station, under contract to Public Transport Victoria:

- 708 : to Hampton station
- 780 : to Frankston station
- 857 : Chelsea station – Dandenong station
- 833 : to Frankston station
