= Frankston railway station =

Railway station in Melbourne, Australia

Frankston
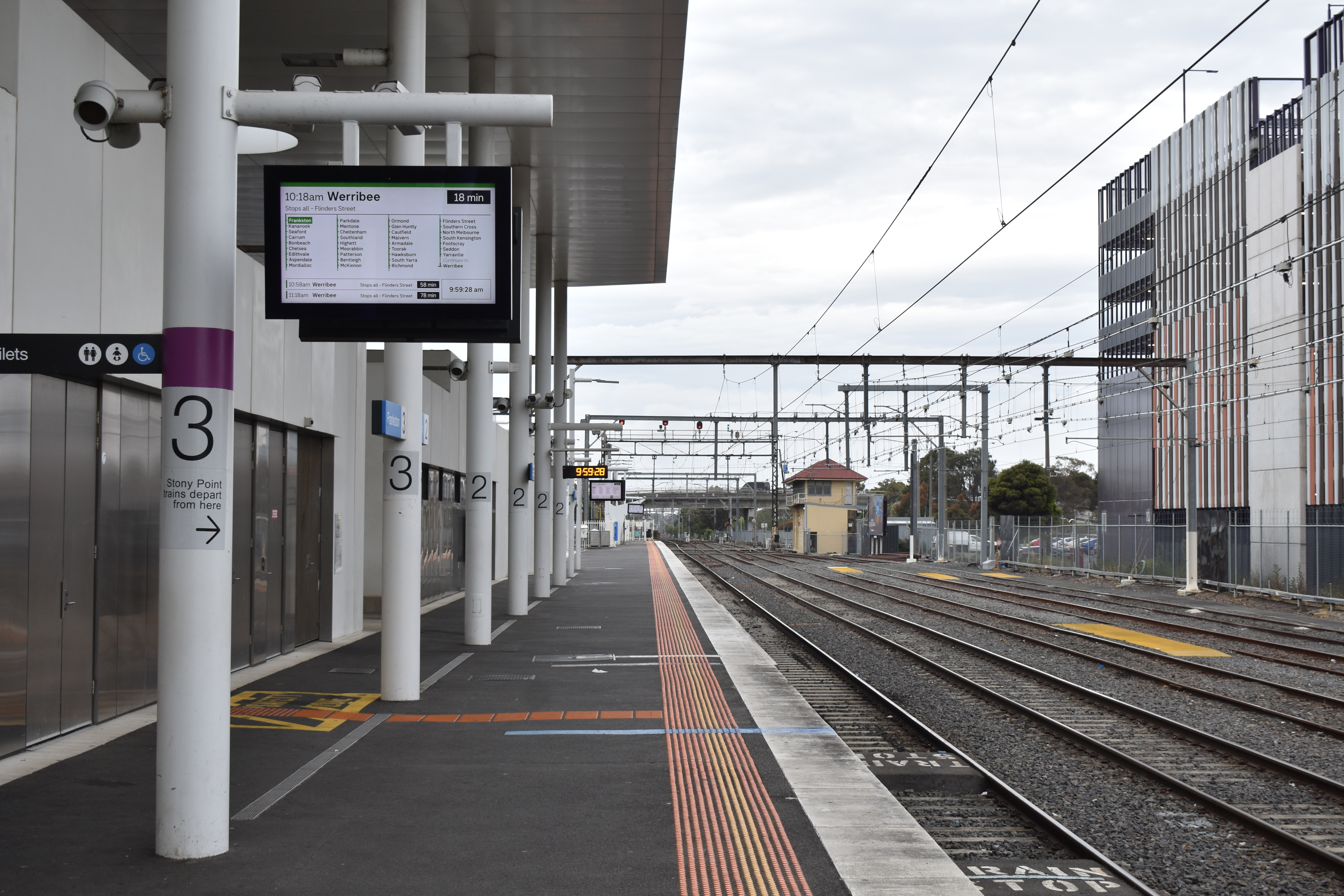
- Northbound view from Platform 3, December 2025

General information
- Location: Young Street, Frankston, Victoria 3199; City of Frankston; Australia
- Coordinates: 38°08′35″S 145°07′34″E
- System: PTV commuter rail station
- Owner: VicTrack
- Operator: Metro Trains
- Lines: Frankston; Stony Point
- Distance: 43.92 kilometres from Southern Cross
- Platforms: 3 (1 island)
- Tracks: 6
- Connections: Bus; SkyBus

Construction
- Structure type: Ground
- Parking: 413
- Cycle facilities: Yes
- Accessible: Yes—step free access

Other information
- Status: Operational, premium station
- Station code: FKN
- Fare zone: Myki zone 2
- Website: Public Transport Victoria

History
- Opened: 1 August 1882; 144 years ago
- Rebuilt: 1985–1987; 18 June 2018
- Electrified: August 1922 (1500 V DC overhead)

Passengers
- 2005–2006: 1,806,560
- 2006–2007: 1,967,223 ▲8.89%
- 2007–2008: 2,503,362 ▲27.25%
- 2008–2009: 3,129,943 ▲25.03%
- 2009–2010: 2,566,588 ▼17.99%
- 2010–2011: 2,766,161 ▲7.77%
- 2011–2012: 2,474,406 ▼10.54%
- 2012–2013: Not measured
- 2013–2014: 1,672,074 ▼32.42%
- 2014–2015: 1,535,028 ▼8.19%
- 2015–2016: 1,555,049 ▲1.3%
- 2016–2017: 1,363,711 ▼12.3%
- 2017–2018: 1,206,185 ▼11.55%
- 2018–2019: 1,296,504 ▲7.48%
- 2019–2020: 896,100 ▼30.88%
- 2020–2021: 576,400 ▼35.67%
- 2021–2022: 692,750 ▲20.18%
- 2022–2023: 1,022,400 ▲47.58%
- 2023–2024: 997,450 ▼2.44%
- 2024–2025: 1,035,450 ▲3.81%

Services
Preceding station	Metro Trains	Following station
Kananook towards Flinders Street via City Loop	Frankston line	Terminus
Terminus	Stony Point line	Leawarra towards Stony Point
Track layout
Location

Frankston station is a railway station operated by Metro Trains Melbourne and the terminus of the Frankston and Stony Point lines, part of the Melbourne rail network. It serves the south-eastern suburb of Frankston, in Melbourne, Victoria, Australia and neighbouring suburbs.

The station opened on 1 August 1882. It features two side platforms, a terminus platform at Platform 1 and having Platform 2 for the terminus platform at the northern end of the platform and the diesel Stony Point line services at the southern end. Its current form was constructed and completed in 2018.

== History ==
Frankston Station opened on 1 August 1882 when the current railway line was extended from Mordialloc. On 1 October 1888, the line was extended to Baxter.

In 1922, the signal box, which is located at the up end of the station and adjacent to the Beach Street pedestrian crossing, was built. It manages the station, stabling yards (located north, east and south of the station) and Stony Point line, including the Long Island Junction. Despite its age, it is still functional and in use to this day.

Until late 1960, a 70-foot (21 m) turntable existed at the station.

On 15 June 1981, the passenger services on the Mornington line, which originated and terminated at Frankston, shut down altogether with the last service operated on 20 May of that year. On 22 June of that year, the passenger service between Frankston and Stony Point were withdrawn and replaced with a bus service, with the goods yard additionally being closed to traffic. On 27 September 1984, unlike the Mornington line, Stony Point passenger rail services were reinstated and opened to the public again.

In 1984, boom barriers replaced the interlocked gates at the former level crossing connecting the two sides of Beach Street, which was in the up direction of the station. In 1990, the Fletcher Road overpass over the northern section of the railway finished construction and the aforementioned level crossing was demolished, dividing Beach Street in half.

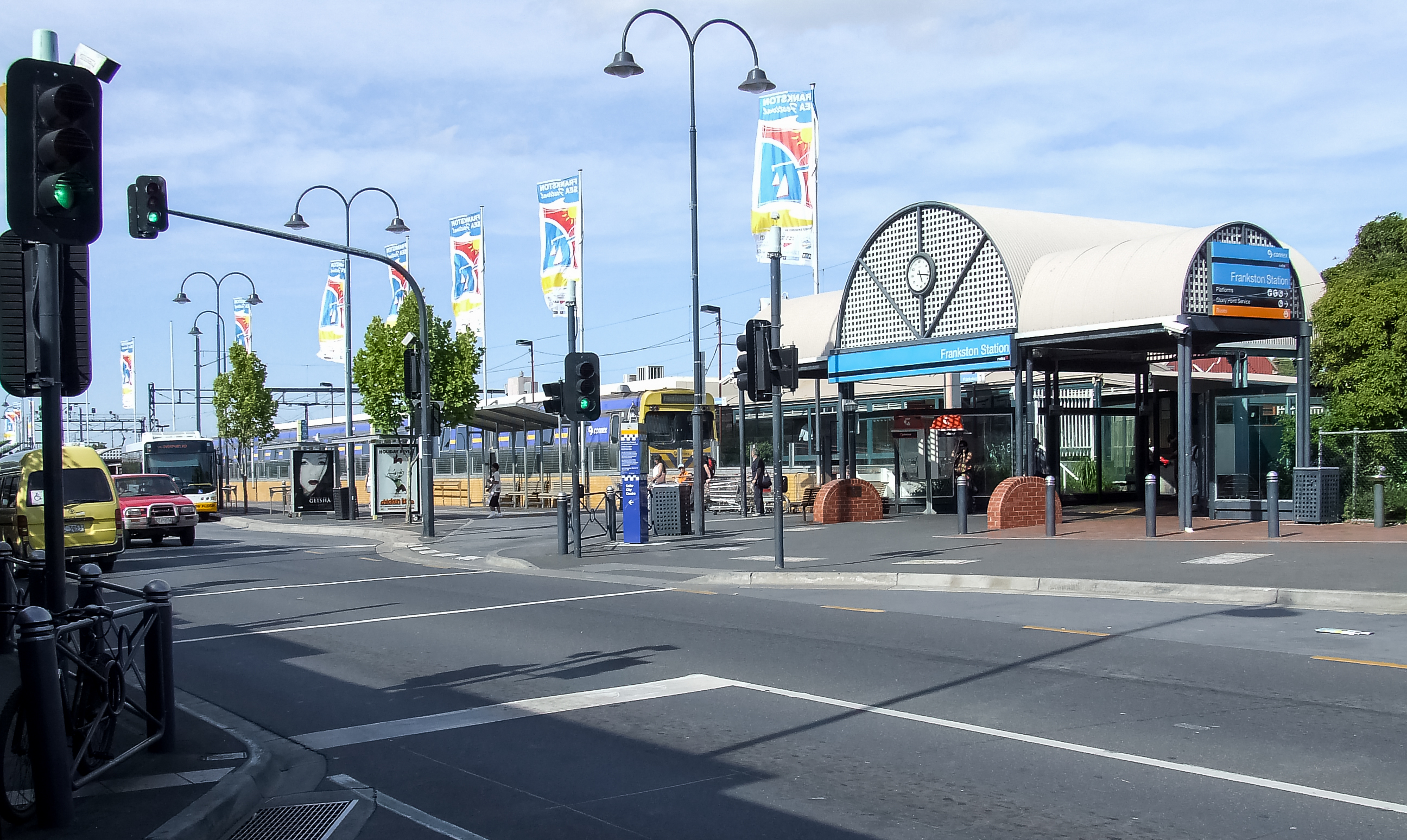
Former station forecourt and entrance, prior to being demolished in 2018, shown here in January 2006

In 1985, construction of the second station building commenced, and was completed by 1987. On 9 November 1995, Frankston station's classification was upgraded and considered as a premium station.

In March 2011, an extension was made to Platform 2 at the northern end of the station to allow Stony Point and electrified metropolitan services to use the platform simultaneously. During the 2011/2012 financial year, Frankston was the 10th-busiest station on Melbourne's metropolitan network, with 2.5 million passenger movements recorded.

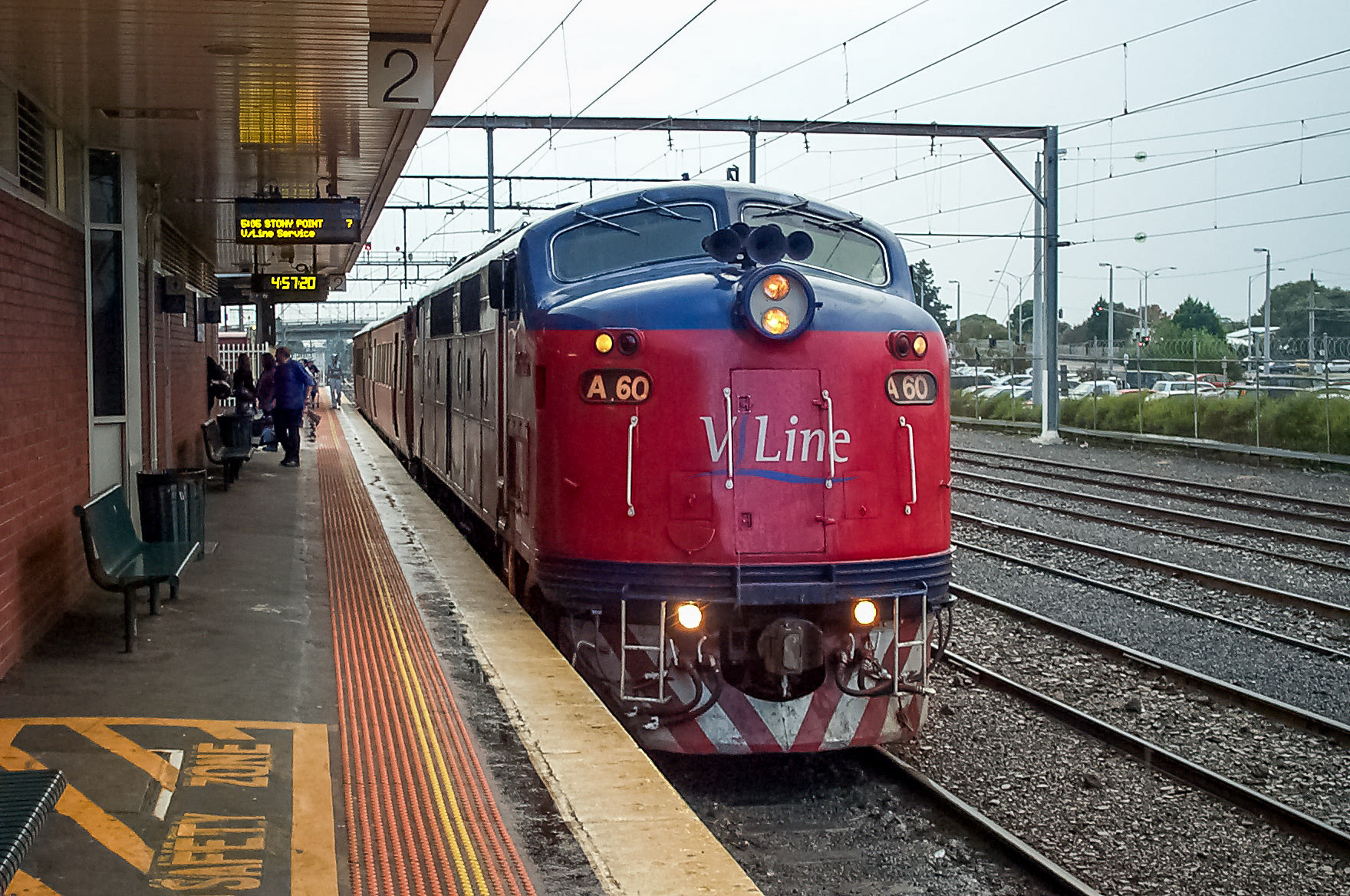
A60 waits to depart Platform 2 with a Stony Point service, April 2008

Between May and June 2018, the station was redeveloped as part of a $63 million project. The new station would be designed by the Australian architecture firm Genton. In May, the station was closed to allow the buildings constructed between 1985 and 1987 to be demolished. In June of that year, the new station opened to passengers.

An $87 million 500-space multi-deck car park opened in December 2024. It was built for the station at the former single-floor western parking area. Controversy arose once Frankstonians discovered that each parking space cost an average of $174,000 Australian dollars, when the money could have been used more efficiently, such as investing in better public transport infrastructure and the inclusion of other types of transport than motor vehicles.

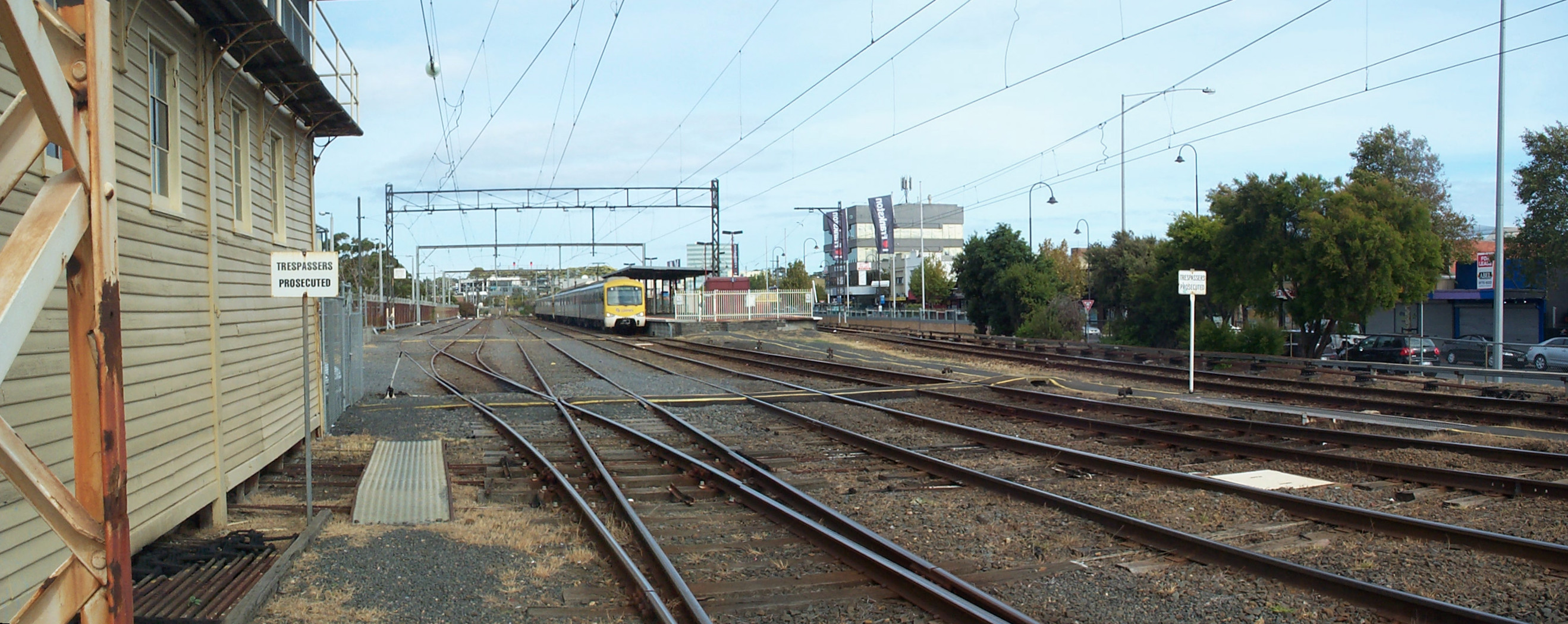
Southbound view of Platform 2, May 2008

== Incidents ==
On 10 June 1975, diesel locomotive B69, operating an up Long Island steel freight train, collided with Hitachi carriage 27M at the station. That carriage became the first Hitachi car in the fleet to be scrapped.

On 22 January 2021, a six-car Comeng set derailed at the southern end of the station.

== Platforms and services ==
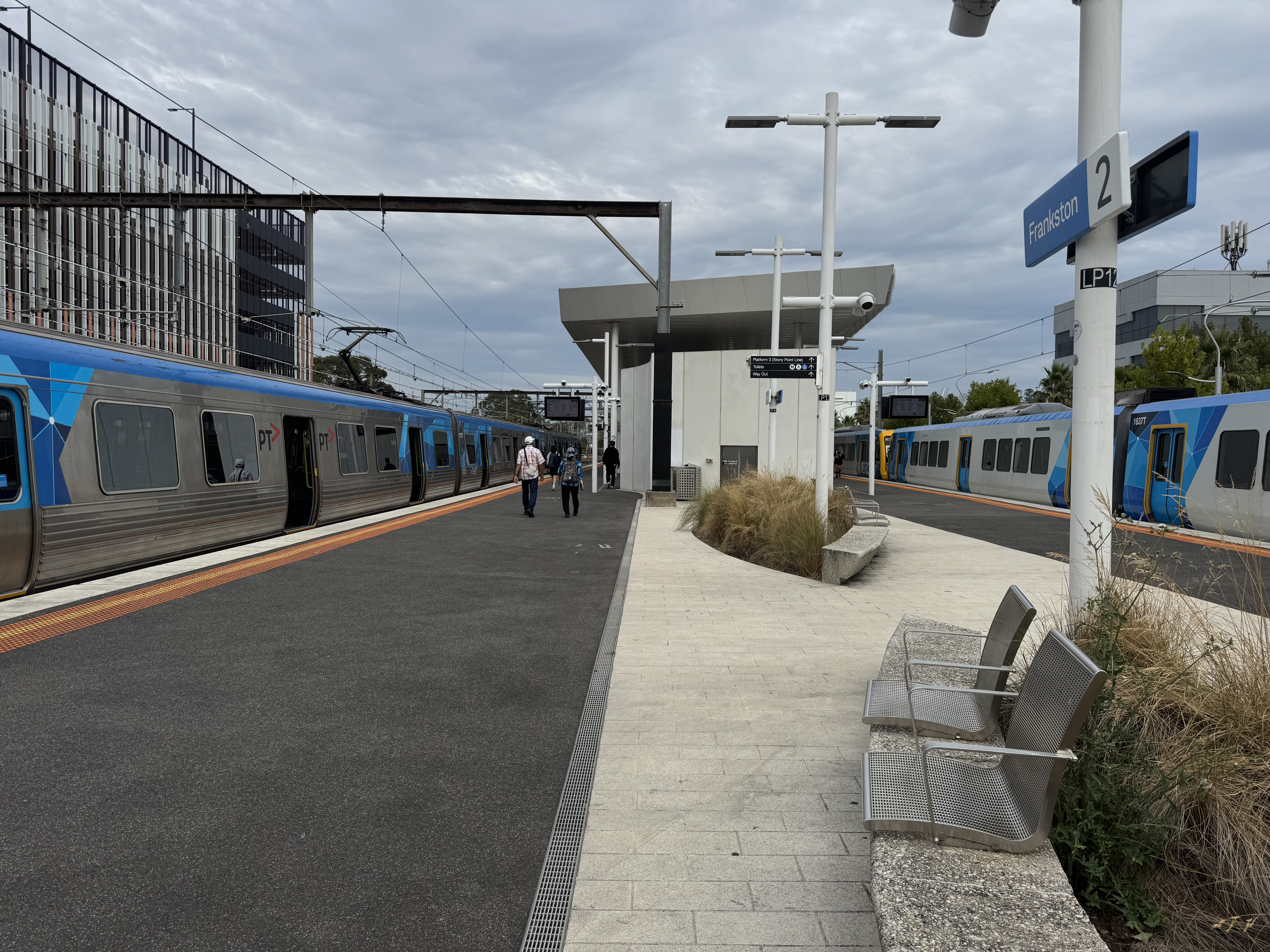
A Comeng and X'Trapolis 100 train occupying Platforms 1 and 2 and the southbound view of the platforms, March 2025

Frankston railway station has a single island platform with two faces. The eastern face (Platform 2) is split into a six-car platform for electric services towards Flinders Street (Melbourne CBD), and a further two-car platform at the down end for Stony Point services.

It is served by Frankston and Stony Point line trains.

Frankston platform arrangement
Platform	Line	Destination	Via	Service Type	Source
1	Frankston line	Flinders Street	City Loop	All stations and limited express services	
2	Frankston line	Flinders Street	City Loop	All stations and limited express services	
3	Stony Point line	Stony Point		All stations	

== Transport links ==
Cranbourne Transit operates three bus routes to and from Frankston station, under contract to Public Transport Victoria:

- 789 : to Langwarrin
- 790 : to Langwarrin
- 791 : to Cranbourne station

Kinetic Melbourne operates one SmartBus route to and from Frankston station, under contract to Public Transport Victoria:

- SmartBus 901 : to Melbourne Airport

Ventura Bus Lines operates eighteen routes via Frankston station, under contract to Public Transport Victoria:

- 770 : to Karingal Hub Shopping Centre
- 771 : to Langwarrin
- 772 : to Eliza Heights (Frankston)
- 773 : to Frankston South
- 774 : to Delacombe Park (Frankston)
- 775 : to Lakewood (Frankston South)
- 776 : to Pearcedale
- 779 : to Belvedere Park Primary School (Seaford)
- 780 : to Carrum station
- 781 : to Mount Martha
- 782 : to Flinders
- 783 : to Hastings
- 784 : to Osborne Primary School (Mount Martha)
- 785 : to Mornington East
- 788 : to Portsea
- 832 : to Carrum Downs
- 833 : to Carrum station
- 887 : Rosebud – Monash University Peninsula Campus

SkyBus also operates a service to Melbourne Airport via Frankston station.
