= Flagstaff =

Flagstaff commonly refers to:

- Flagpole, a staff for displaying a flag
- Flagstaff, Arizona, the county seat of Coconino County, Arizona

Flagstaff may also refer to:

== United States ==
- Flagstaff station, in Flagstaff, Arizona
- United States Naval Observatory Flagstaff Station, in Flagstaff, Arizona
- Flagstaff Mountain (Boulder County, Colorado), a peak near Boulder, Colorado
- Flagstaff Mountain (Stevens County, Washington), a peak near Northport, Washington
- Flagstaff, Maine, a submerged former town
  - Flagstaff Lake (Maine), on the Dead River
- Flagstaff (Mandeville, Louisiana), a historic home listed on the National Register of Historic Places in St. Tammany Parish

== Australia ==
- Flagstaff Gardens, a park in Melbourne
- Flagstaff railway station, Melbourne
- Flagstaff, Victoria

== Canada ==
- Flagstaff County, a municipal district in Alberta

== Ghana ==
- The Flagstaff House, Accra; residence and office of the President of Ghana

== Hong Kong ==
- Flagstaff House, the home to the Commander of British Forces in Hong Kong and now home to a museum of teaware

== New Zealand ==
- Flagstaff (Otago), a hill above Dunedin
- Flagstaff, Hamilton, a suburb

== Pakistan ==
- Flagstaff House or Quaid-e-Azam House, Karachi; home of Muhammad Ali Jinnah, Governor General of Pakistan and founder of modern Pakistan

== South Africa ==
- Flagstaff, Eastern Cape

== See also ==
- Flagstaff Hill (disambiguation)
- Flagstaff Lake (disambiguation)
