= Melbourne Central railway station =

Railway station in Melbourne, Australia

Melbourne Central
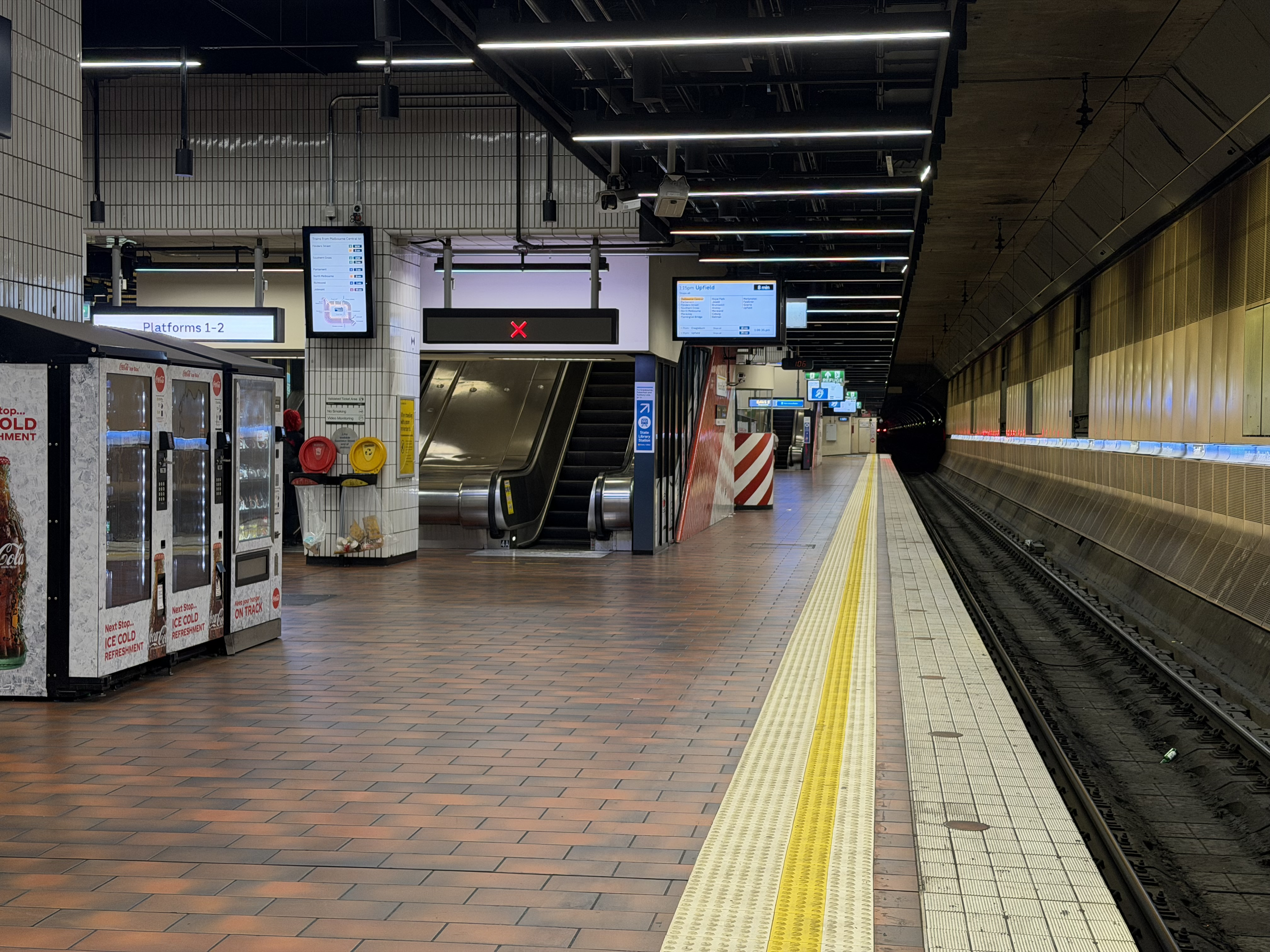
- Eastbound view from Platform 3, February 2026

General information
- Location: La Trobe Street, Melbourne, Victoria 3000; City of Melbourne; Australia
- Coordinates: 37°48′36″S 144°57′46″E
- System: PTV commuter rail station
- Owner: VicTrack
- Operator: Metro Trains
- Lines: Hurstbridge Mernda; Frankston; Lilydale Belgrave Alamein (Note: Weekday pre-peak and post-peak only); Glen Waverley; Craigieburn Upfield
- Platforms: 4 (2 island)
- Tracks: 4
- Connections: State Library: Sunbury; Tram; Bus

Construction
- Structure type: Underground
- Depth: 29 metres (95 ft)
- Platform levels: 2
- Accessible: Yes—step free access

Other information
- Status: Operational, premium station
- Station code: MCE
- Fare zone: Myki zone 1
- Website: Public Transport Victoria

History
- Opened: 24 January 1981; 45 years ago
- Electrified: January 1981 (1500 V DC overhead)
- Former names: Museum (1981–1997)

Passengers
- 2019-2020: 10.866 million ▼28.75%
- 2020-2021: 4.207 million ▼61.28%
- 2021–2022: 5.491 million ▲30.54%
- 2022–2023: 8.626 million ▲57.09%
- 2023–2024: 11.177 million ▲29.57%

Services
Preceding station	Metro Trains	Following station
Flagstaff One-way operation	Mernda line	Parliament towards Mernda, Eltham or Hurstbridge
Flagstaff One-way operation	Hurstbridge line	Parliament towards Mernda, Eltham or Hurstbridge
Flagstaff towards Frankston via Flinders Street	Frankston line	Parliament One-way operation
Direction of travel on metropolitan lines below between stations on the City Loop changes to either Flagstaff or Parliament depending on the line and time of day.
Flagstaff towards Flinders Street	Lilydale line	Parliament towards Lilydale, Belgrave, Alamein or Glen Waverley
Flagstaff towards Flinders Street	Belgrave line	Parliament towards Lilydale, Belgrave, Alamein or Glen Waverley
Flagstaff towards Flinders Street	Alamein line Weekday peak hours only	Parliament towards Lilydale, Belgrave, Alamein or Glen Waverley
Flagstaff towards Flinders Street	Glen Waverley line Weekday afternoon and weekends only	Parliament towards Lilydale, Belgrave, Alamein or Glen Waverley
Flagstaff towards Upfield or Craigieburn	Upfield line	Parliament towards Flinders Street
Flagstaff towards Upfield or Craigieburn	Craigieburn line	Parliament towards Flinders Street
Transfer at State Library
Preceding station	Metro Trains	Following station
Parkville towards Watergardens or Sunbury	Sunbury line	Town Hall towards East Pakenham or Cranbourne
Former services
Preceding station	Metro Trains	Following station
Pre 2026
Flagstaff towards Flinders Street	Cranbourne line	Parliament towards East Pakenham or Cranbourne
Flagstaff towards Flinders Street	Pakenham line	Parliament towards East Pakenham or Cranbourne
Flagstaff towards Watergardens or Sunbury	Sunbury line	Parliament towards Flinders Street
Pre 2021
Flagstaff towards Flinders Street	Sandringham line	Parliament towards Sandringham
Flagstaff towards Werribee	Werribee line	Parliament towards Flinders Street
Track layout
Location

Melbourne Central station is a railway station operated by Metro Trains Melbourne on the Burnley, Caulfield, Clifton Hill and Northern group lines, which are part of the Melbourne rail network. It serves the Melbourne city centre in Victoria, Australia. Melbourne Central is an underground premium station on the City Loop, featuring four platforms, two island platforms on two floors connected to street level by a shopping and commercial precinct. It opened on 24 January 1981, with station refurbishments underway as of June 2024.

Initially opened as Museum, the station was given its current name of Melbourne Central on 16 February 1997, after the Melbourne Central Shopping Centre, which it is beneath.

The station is located under La Trobe Street, between Swanston and Elizabeth Streets, on the northern edge of the central business district (CBD). It feeds into Melbourne's main metro network station, Flinders Street, and also Southern Cross, Melbourne's main regional terminus. In 2023-24, it was the third-busiest station on the Melbourne metropolitan rail network, with 11.177 million passengers.

== History ==
The station was built using cut and cover construction. In December 1973, to permit excavation of the station, La Trobe Street and its tram tracks were temporarily relocated to the south, onto the site of what is now the Melbourne Central Shopping Centre, and moved back on completion of the work in 1978. The pit was 168 metres (551 ft 2 in) long and 22.5 metres (73 ft 10 in) wide, 29 metres (95 ft 2 in) deep at the Swanston Street end and 22 metres (72 ft 2 in) deep at the Elizabeth Street end. Seven layers of struts were used to support the excavation, with 2,600 tonnes of steel temporary supports required.

The station was designed by architectural firm Perrott Lyon Mathieson, with initial layout by associate David Simpson, followed by detailed design by Graeme Butler. The design included the two pairs of platforms, a spacious concourse directly under La Trobe Street, with entries facing the Elizabeth Street and Swanston Street corners. The Swanston Street corner included a set of raised circular platforms above the entry; during a Royal Visit, Queen Elizabeth was shown around the not yet operational station on 28 May 1980, and unveiled a plaque naming it the Queen Elizabeth Plaza.

The station was finally opened on 24 January 1981, and opened as Museum, after the adjacent National Museum of Victoria and Science Museum of Victoria, in the State Library of Victoria complex on the opposite side of Swanston Street. It was the first station to open on the City Loop. Initially, the station was only used by trains on the Burnley and Caulfield groups, using platforms 2 and 4, with services from the Clifton Hill group beginning to use platform 1 on 31 October 1982, and trains from the Northern group beginning to use platform 3 on 1 May 1984. The Elizabeth Street entrance to the station opened on 5 April 1982.

The adjoining Melbourne Central Shopping Centre opened in 1991, being built around the existing escalators to street level, with only minor integration between the station concourse and shopping centre. The station was renamed after the shopping centre on 16 February 1997, and a few months later on 13 July, the National Museum of Victoria closed at the State Library site, in preparation for its relocation to Carlton, where it reopened as the Melbourne Museum in 2000.

The station concourse was extensively redeveloped in 2002/2003, as part of a redevelopment of the shopping centre, integrating it into the complex. The direct escalators from the concourse to Swanston Street closed in November 2003, and were replaced by escalators rising into the atrium under the cone in the centre of the shopping centre, making the path for rail passengers more convoluted. The concourse under La Trobe Street was integrated into the shopping centre with the installation of numerous shops.

On 1 February 2026, the Pakenham, Cranbourne and Sunbury lines were moved out of the City Loop and into the Metro Tunnel. Metro Tunnel services can be accessed from Melbourne Central by changing to State Library station, whose concourse is connected to Melbourne Central. Services on the Frankston line returned to the City Loop, accessed from the same platforms formerly used for the Cranbourne and Pakenham lines.

== Facilities ==
Melbourne Central has an underground concourse and two levels of platforms below it (2 island platforms with four faces and tracks). Each platform serves a separate group of rail lines that leave the Loop and radiate out into the city's suburbs. At peak times, with a train arriving every 2.5 minutes, the station has a passenger flow of 30,000 per hour. Three elevators were initially provided, as well as 21 escalators. Melbourne Central is a premium station, meaning that it is staffed from first to last train and provides extra customer services.

The concourse has two sections separated by the shopping centre food court:

- The Elizabeth Street concourse has stairs and three escalators providing access to the street, a walkway to the Swanston Street concourse, a booking office, ticket barriers, toilets, and stairs and five escalators leading down to the platforms.
- The Swanston Street concourse was altered in the early 2000s, when redevelopment works were carried out at the adjacent Melbourne Central Shopping Centre. Inside the ticket barriers there are toilets, two lifts and five escalators going to the platforms, and the passage to State Library. Outside is a food court, an exit to La Trobe Street via the elevators and Level LG of the shopping centre (which passes under Little Lonsdale Street). There is also a lift and four escalators to the shopping centre level above. On the next level up (Level G), there is access to Little Lonsdale and La Trobe Streets via the shopping centre. Access to Swanston Street is via three escalators and a set of stairs rising another floor (or the lift to Level 1 and a 70 m (230 ft) walk), and a walk through the shopping centre past the shot tower.

== Station layout ==
Melbourne Central complex/platform arrangement
Level	Floor	Exit details					
G	Ground	Elizabeth Street exit.					
O	Office	Staff only, no public access.					
C/LG	Concourse	Customer service, Melbourne Central Shopping Centre, link to State Library station.					
	Platform	Line	Destination	Via	Service Type	Notes	Source
L1	1	Hurstbridge line Mernda line	Mernda, Macleod, Greensborough, Eltham or Hurstbridge	Jolimont	All stations and limited express services	Services to Macleod and Greensborough only operate during weekday peaks.	
L1	2	Frankston line	Cheltenham, Mordialloc, Carrum or Frankston	Flinders Street	All stations and limited express services	Services to Cheltenham, Mordialloc and Carrum only operate during weekday peaks	
L2	3	Craigieburn line Upfield line	Broadmeadows, Craigieburn or Upfield	Flinders Street or North Melbourne	All stations and limited express services	Services to Broadmeadows only operate during weekday morning peaks.	
L2	4	Alamein line Belgrave line Glen Waverley line Lilydale line	Glen Waverley, Alamein, Blackburn, Ringwood, Lilydale or Belgrave	Flinders Street or Richmond	All stations and limited express services	Services to Alamein and Ringwood only operate during weekday peaks. Services to Blackburn only operate on weekdays.	

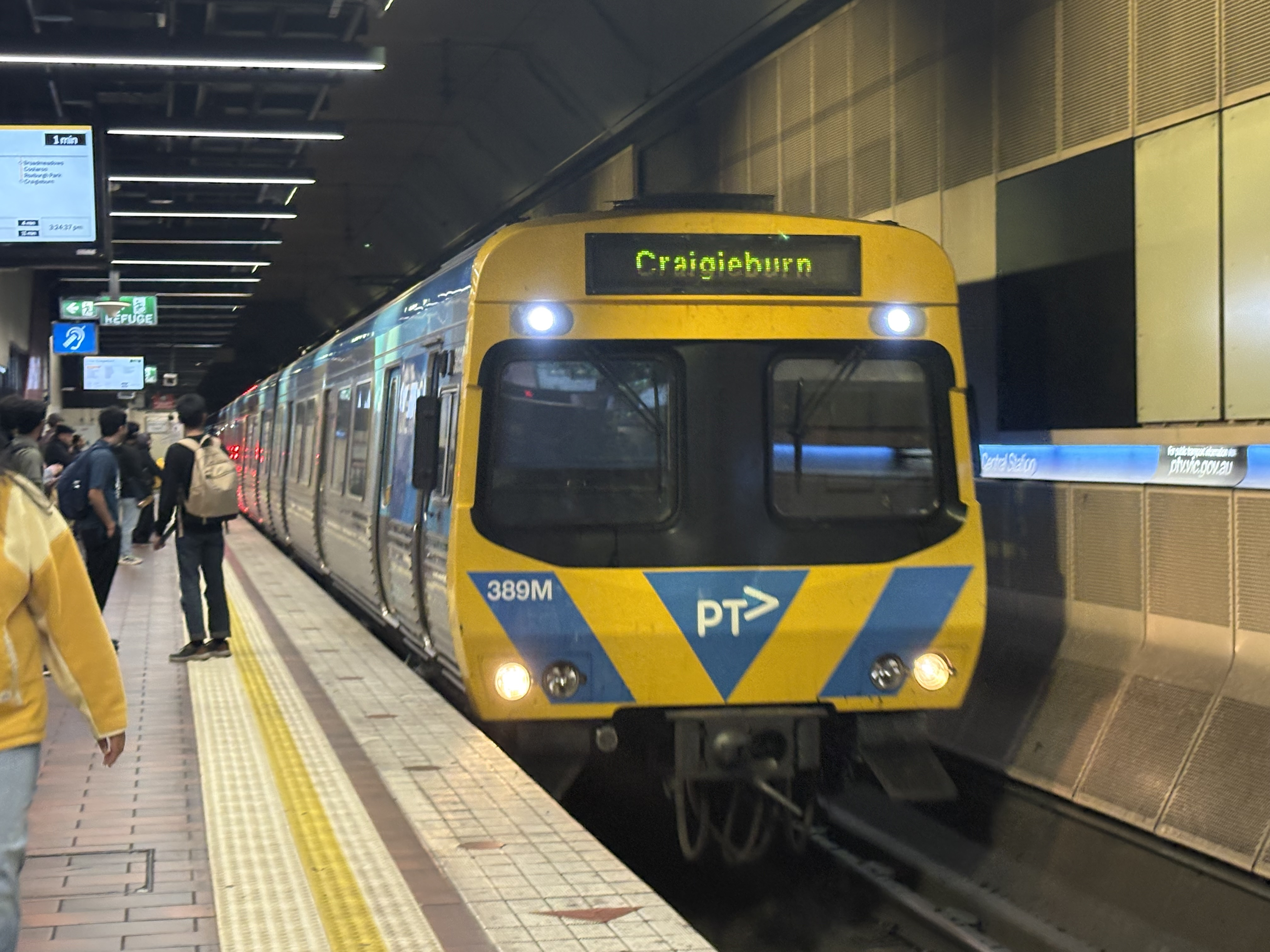
EDI Comeng arriving onto Platform 3 with a service to Craigieburn, May 2026

== Usage ==
Passenger usage at Melbourne Central Station between 2008 and 2024 sorted by financial year.

Melbourne Central is the third-busiest station on Melbourne's metropolitan rail network.

== Transport links ==
Passengers can connect at State library station for services at the Sunbury, Cranbourne, and Pakenham lines from Melbourne Central.

Yarra Trams operates thirteen services via Melbourne Central station, on Swanston, Elizabeth, and La Trobe Streets.

Swanston Street

- : East Coburg – South Melbourne Beach
- : Melbourne University – Malvern East
- : Melbourne University – Malvern
- : Moreland – Glen Iris
- : Melbourne University – Kew
- : Melbourne University – Brighton East
- : Melbourne University – Carnegie
- : Melbourne University – Camberwell

Elizabeth Street

- : Coburg North – Flinders Street station
- : West Maribyrnong – Flinders Street station
- : Airport West – Flinders Street station

La Trobe Street

- : St Vincent's Plaza – Central Pier Docklands
- : City Circle

Kinetic Melbourne operates four bus routes from Lonsdale Street (Melbourne Central side), under contract to Public Transport Victoria:

- 200 : to Bulleen
- 207 : to Westfield Doncaster
- 250 : to La Trobe University Bundoora campus
- 251 : to Northland Shopping Centre

Kinetic Melbourne operates thirteen bus routes from Lonsdale Street (Myer side), under contract to Public Transport Victoria:

- 250 : to Queen Street
- 251 : to Queen Street
- 302 : to Queen Street
- 303 : to Queen Street
- 304 : to King Street
- 305 : to Spencer Street (Peak Hour only)
- 309 : to Queen Street
- 318 : to Spencer Street
- 350 : to Queen Street
- SmartBus 905 : to Spencer Street
- SmartBus 906 : to Spencer Street
- SmartBus 907 : to Spencer Street
- SmartBus 908 : to Spencer Street (Peak Hour only)

Kinetic Melbourne operates eleven bus routes from Swanston/Lonsdale Streets (QV), under contract to Public Transport Victoria:

- 302 : to Box Hill station
- 303 : to Ringwood North
- 304 : to Westfield Doncaster
- 305 : to The Pines Shopping Centre (Peak Hour only)
- 309 : to Donvale
- 318 : to Deep Creek Reserve (Doncaster East)
- 350 : to La Trobe University Bundoora campus
- SmartBus 905 : to The Pines Shopping Centre
- SmartBus 906 : to Warrandyte
- SmartBus 907 : to Mitcham station
- SmartBus 908 : to The Pines Shopping Centre (Peak Hour only)
