= Flagstaff Mountain =

Flagstaff Mountain may refer to:

- Flagstaff Mountain (Boulder County, Colorado), a peak near Boulder, Colorado
- Flagstaff Mountain (Stevens County, Washington), a peak near Northport, Washington
