= Flagstaff Lake =

Flagstaff Lake may refer to the following lakes in the United States:

- Flagstaff Lake (Maine)
- Flagstaff Lake (Oregon)
- Lake Flagstaff, Western Australia
