= Unga Island =

Island in Alaska, United States

Coordinates: 55°15′38″N 160°41′42″W

Unga Island.

Unga Island (Uĝnaasaqax̂ in Aleut) is the largest of the Shumagin Islands off the Alaska Peninsula in southwestern Alaska, United States. The island has a land area of 170.73 sq mi (442.188 km^{2}), making it the 36th largest island in the United States. As of the 2000 census, it had a permanent population of one.

Unga Island was formerly named Grekodelarovskoe (Greek Delarov) for Greek explorer Evstratii Ivanovich Delarov Greek: (Ευστράτιος Ντελάρωφ) who explored the area in the late 18th century on behalf of the Russian-American Company.

In 1968, Unga Island, was designated as a National Natural Landmark by the National Park Service.

== Demographics ==
Historical population
Census	Pop.	Note	%±
1940	79		—
U.S. Decennial Census

Unga Island appeared once on the 1940 U.S. Census as an unincorporated area with a population of 79. This figure was technically erroneous, as the entire population of the island at the time was 231. The 79 listed were those who lived on the island outside the village of Unga, which had 152 residents.

== See also ==
- Flagstaff Hill (Alaska)
