= State Library railway station =

Railway station in Melbourne CBD, Victoria, Australia

State Library
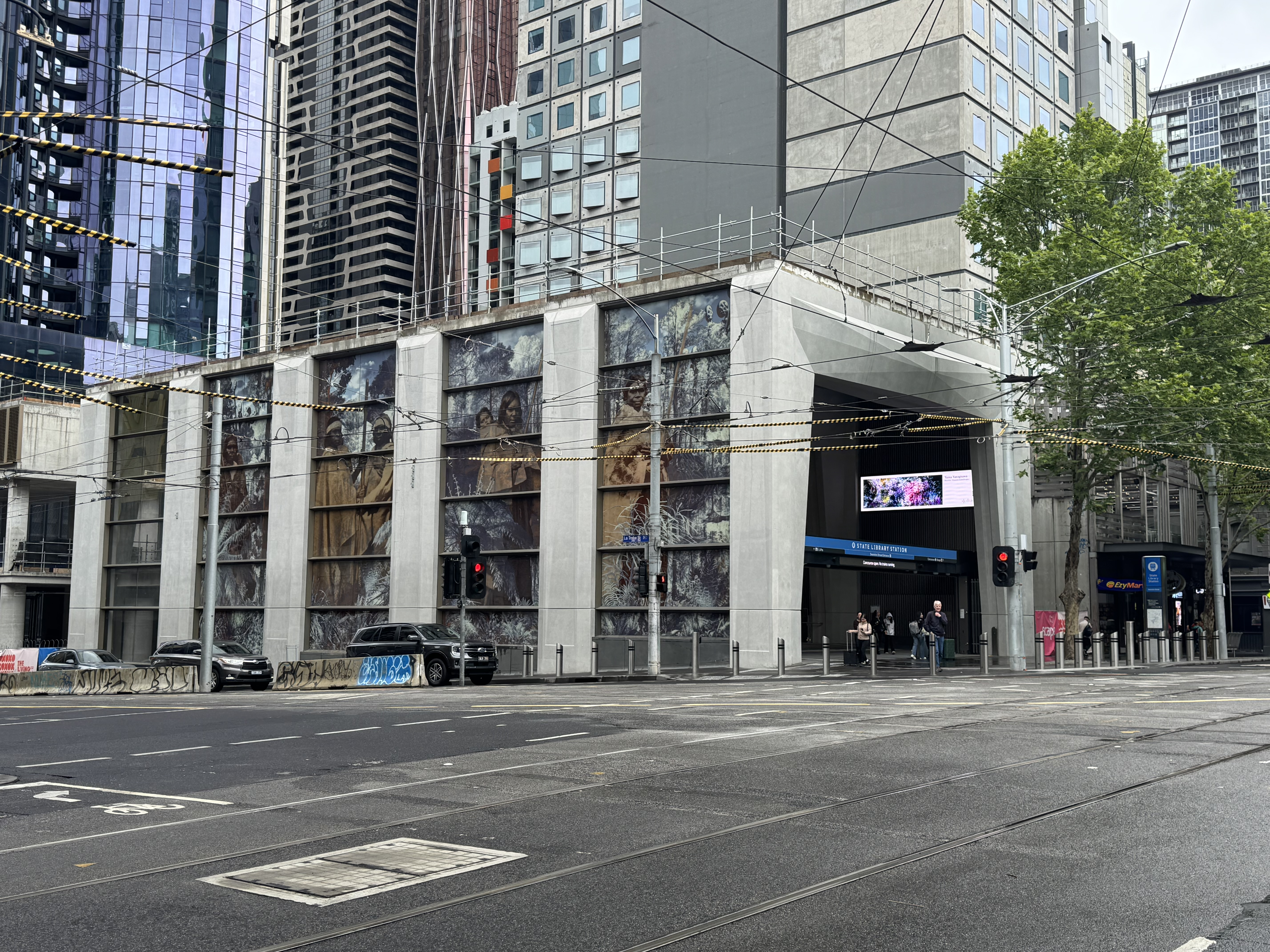
- Station building and entrance, November 2025

General information
- Location: Swanston Street; Melbourne, Victoria 3000; City of Melbourne; Australia
- Coordinates: 37.8076312°S 144.9623925°E
- System: PTV commuter rail station
- Owner: VicTrack
- Operator: Metro Trains
- Line: Sunbury
- Distance: 9.35 kilometres from Southern Cross
- Platforms: 2
- Tracks: 2
- Connections: Melbourne Central: Hurstbridge Mernda; Lilydale Belgrave Alamein (Note: Weekday pre-peak and post-peak only); Glen Waverley; Frankston; Craigieburn Upfield; Tram

Construction
- Structure type: Underground
- Accessible: Yes—step free access

Other information
- Status: Operational, premium station
- Station code: STL
- Fare zone: Myki zone 1
- Website: Public Transport Victoria

History
- Opened: 30 November 2025; 11 months ago
- Electrified: Yes (1500 V DC overhead)

Services
Preceding station	Metro Trains	Following station
Town Hall towards Cranbourne or East Pakenham	Sunbury line	Parkville towards Watergardens or Sunbury
Track layout
Location

State Library railway station is an underground railway station operated by Metro Trains Melbourne on the Sunbury line, part of the Melbourne rail network. It serves the northern end of the Melbourne city centre in Melbourne, Victoria, Australia.

As part of the Metro Tunnel project, State Library is an underground premium station, featuring an island platform with two platforms. The station connects directly to Melbourne Central station via an underground concourse. Construction commenced in 2018, with major construction completed in October 2025. The station opened on 30 November 2025, along with the rest of the Metro Tunnel.

The station features two street-level entrances on La Trobe and Franklin Streets and is named for the nearby State Library of Victoria. It provides direct access to RMIT University, Melbourne City Baths, Melbourne Central shopping centre and the nearby Queen Victoria Market.

== History ==
In December 2008, the proposal for a new underground rail corridor running north-south through the Melbourne CBD was incorporated into the Brumby Ministry's Victorian Transport Plan after originally featuring in a report from Rod Eddington. It was to be built in two stages: the first from Footscray to St Kilda Road, and the second continuing to Caulfield. The need for a new rail corridor and stations through the CBD was identified in an effort to reduce congestion on the City Loop, enabling more frequent and reliable services across Melbourne's railway network.

Following a change of State Government, in 2012/2013 the Baillieu and Napthine Ministries announced a revised plan with the tunnel instead running from South Kensington to South Yarra along a similar route to the original proposal. The revised project included five underground stations, including one under the working title "CBD North" and was listed as the highest-priority infrastructure project in Melbourne by Infrastructure Australia.

The project went unfunded due largely to tension between the state and federal governments. In February 2015 the proposal was revived by the newly elected Andrews Ministry with construction to commence in 2018 and the tunnel and stations planned to open in 2026. The total cost of the project is A$11 billion.

The Metro Tunnel project began in 2015, with early works commencing on the two central business district (CBD) station sites in 2017. Major station works at State Library began in 2018. Sections of A'Beckett and Franklin streets were closed off and acoustic sheds constructed to minimise noise and dust, while small commercial buildings on the corner of Swanston and La Trobe streets were demolished to construct an access shaft for excavation.

Cross Yarra Partnership, led by Lendlease, was named as the preferred bidder for the construction contract in July 2017 and designs for the project's five stations were presented by the consortium were released publicly, as well as details of connections to existing stations and streetscapes. Updated designs were released in 2018, and major construction commenced on the station that year.

In August 2017, the Government launched a naming competition for the five new railway stations to be constructed as part of the Metro Rail Project. Following over 50,000 submissions, in November 2017 State Library was announced as the winning entry for the working-title CBD North station due to its proximity to the landmark State Library of Victoria building.

In July 2019, road-headers broke through at State Library connecting two excavated caverns, with four road-headers used on the station in total. The first Tunnel Boring Machine, named Joan, broke through to State Library station in December 2020 before continuing south to Town Hall station. Tunneling was completed in April 2021. After the laying of track, Platform Screen Doors began being installed at State Library in early 2023.

In June 2023, the first above-ground structures of the main station entrance on the corner of Swanston and La Trobe streets were built, with large oversized beams craned in overnight to sit above the main bank of escalators. Works began on the underground connection between State Library and the existing Melbourne Central station, including new escalators to the Melbourne Central platforms. Excavation at the La Trobe street site was completed in July 2023, marking the end of excavation across the Metro Tunnel project, and the first State Library acoustic sheds were planned to be dismantled in August.

On 6 October 2025, it was announced that major construction works at State Library had been completed, subsequently marking the last Metro Tunnel station to be completed.

== Design ==
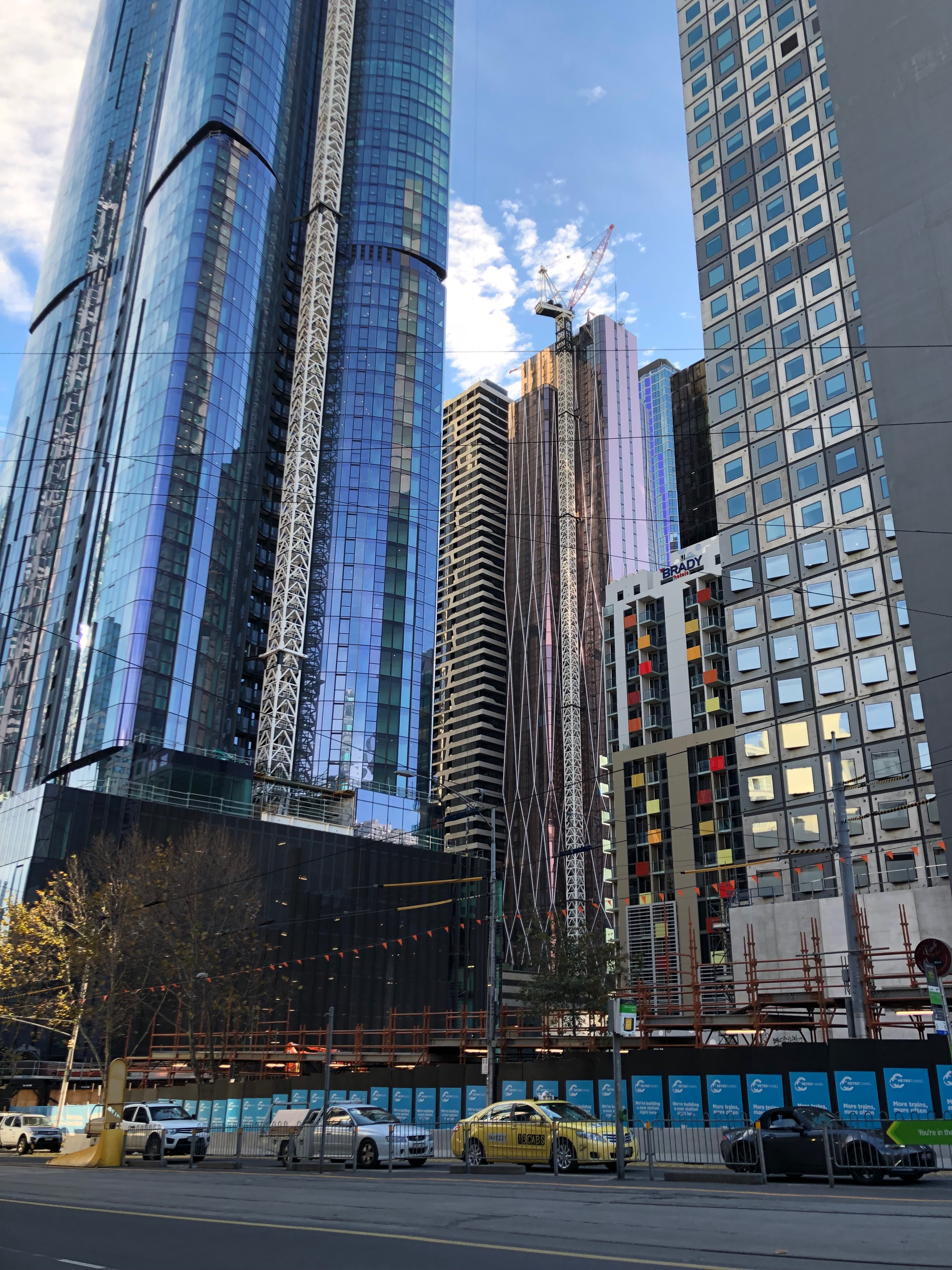
State Library main entrance construction site in 2018, where an access shaft was dug to allow excavation of the main mined station cavern. Aurora Melbourne Central adjoins the construction site.

The initial build method chosen for construction was cut-and-cover, however this was changed to a deeper, mined station in order to avoid significant disruption and to keep trams running along the world's busiest tram corridor, Swanston Street. The station platforms sit 36 metres (118 ft 1 in) below Swanston Street, the city's deepest station, due to the need to sit below the existing four City Loop tunnels.

Like Town Hall station, State Library is designed using a unique "trinocular" construction method involving three large, ping mined tunnels with vaulted ceilings. Large arches will define the 230-metre (754 ft 7 in) long platforms.

The station was designed by architects RSHP, Hassell and Weston Williamson.

=== Art ===
Australian artist Danie Mellor has been commissioned to create a permanent artwork for the station as part of the Metro Tunnel's legacy artwork program. In 2024 it was revealed that this artwork would be printed glass panels forming the station's large glass facade on its La Trobe Street entrance. The artwork will be a collage of Mellor's photography and historical portraits of Wurundjeri Woi Wurrung women sourced from the nearby State Library of Victoria.

== State Library station precinct ==
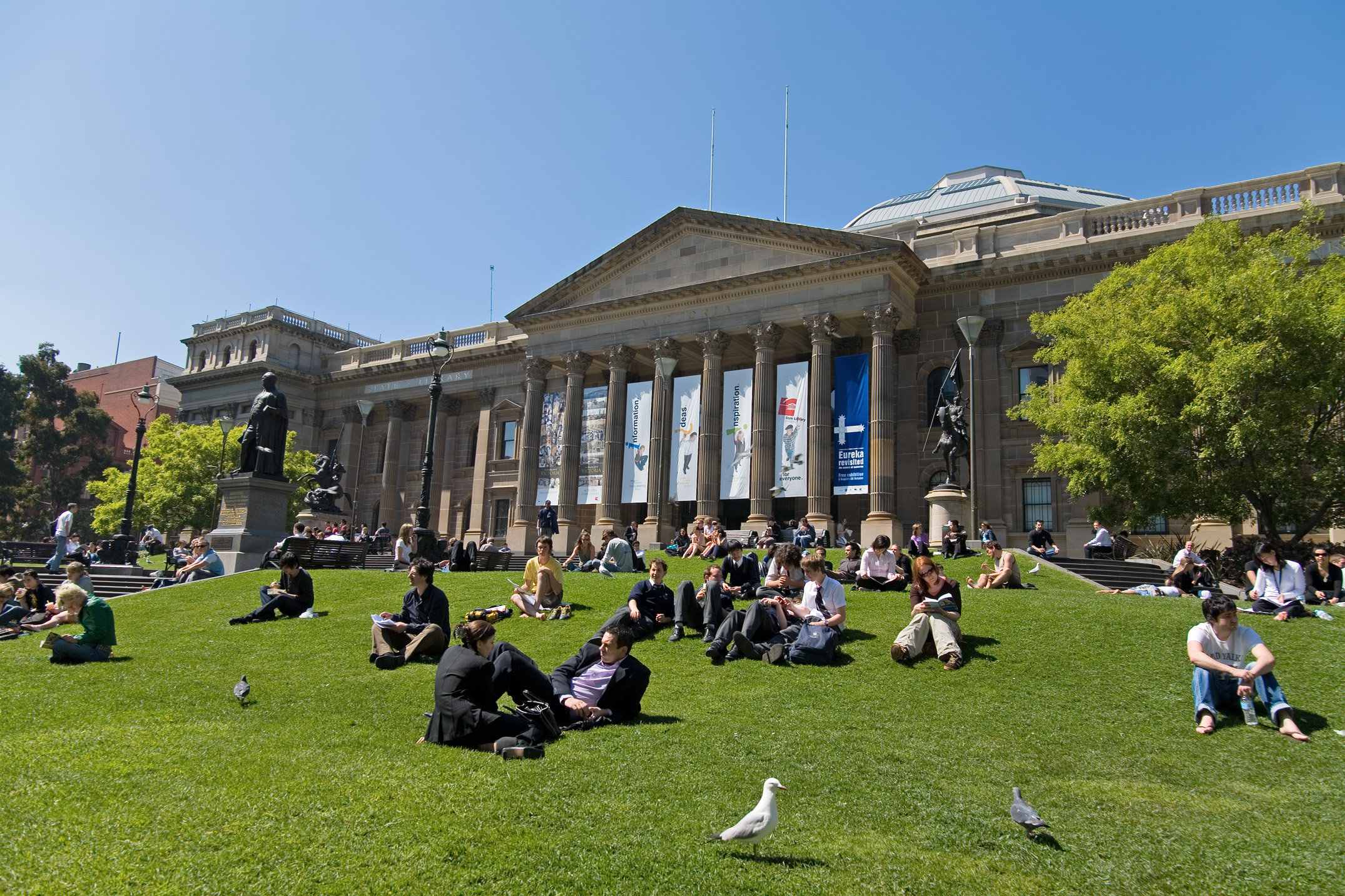
Nearby State Library of Victoria, after which the station is named

The railway station is located below Swanston Street between La Trobe and Franklin Streets in the north of Melbourne's CBD. The station has entrances at the corner of Latrobe/Swanston Street and Franklin/Swanston Street, enabling more convenient access to City Baths and Queen Victoria Market, and connects with Melbourne Central station via the La Trobe Street entrance, enabling transfer from other metropolitan lines. Tram services are accessible on Swanston and La Trobe Streets.

Updated precinct designs for State Library were released in 2022, which included the installation of separate bike lanes on Franklin Street. In July 2023, plans were released by the City of Melbourne for a redesign of Franklin Street between the northern entrance to State Library and a new public square at the Queen Victoria Market. The plans include a narrowing of Franklin Street and the creation of separate bike lanes and 1,250 square metres (13,500 sq ft) of linear park, a continuation of the Franklin Street works being delivered by the Metro Tunnel project.

== Station layout ==
G	Street level	Entrances/Exits
B1	Staff Only	Station control room, offices
B2/C	Swanston Street Concourse	Retail, customer service, link to Melbourne Central station
B3	Franklin Street Concourse	Walkway to concourse
B4/PM	Swanston Street Concourse	Lift platform mezzanine, walkway to platforms
B5	Swanston Street Concourse	Escalator platform mezzanine, walkway to platforms
B5	Franklin Street Concourse	Customer service, toilets
B6; Platforms	Platform 1	Sunbury line towards Sunbury (Parkville) →
B6; Platforms	Island platform, doors will open on the right
B6; Platforms	Platform 2	← Sunbury line towards East Pakenham or Cranbourne (Town Hall)

== Transport links ==
Passengers can transfer from State Library Station to Melbourne Central Station via the shared concourse to connect with City Loop Services.

- Hurstbridge line all stations and limited stop services to Hurstbridge
- Mernda line all stations and limited stop services to Mernda
- Lilydale line all stations and limited stop services to Lilydale
- Belgrave line all stations and limited stop services to Belgrave
- Glen Waverley line all stations and limited stop services to Glen Waverley
- Alamein line weekday all stations and limited stop services to Alamein
- Craigieburn line all stations and limited stop services to Craigieburn
- Upfield line all stations and limited stop services to Upfield
- Frankston line all stations and limited stop services to Frankston

Yarra Trams operates 10 services via State Library station on Swanston Street and La Trobe Street.

Swanston Street

- : East Coburg – South Melbourne Beach
- : Melbourne University – East Malvern
- : Melbourne University – Malvern
- : Moreland – Glen Iris
- : Melbourne University – Kew
- : Melbourne University – East Brighton
- : Melbourne University – Carnegie
- : Melbourne University – Camberwell

La Trobe Street

- : St Vincent's Plaza – Central Pier Docklands
- : City Circle

== Gallery ==
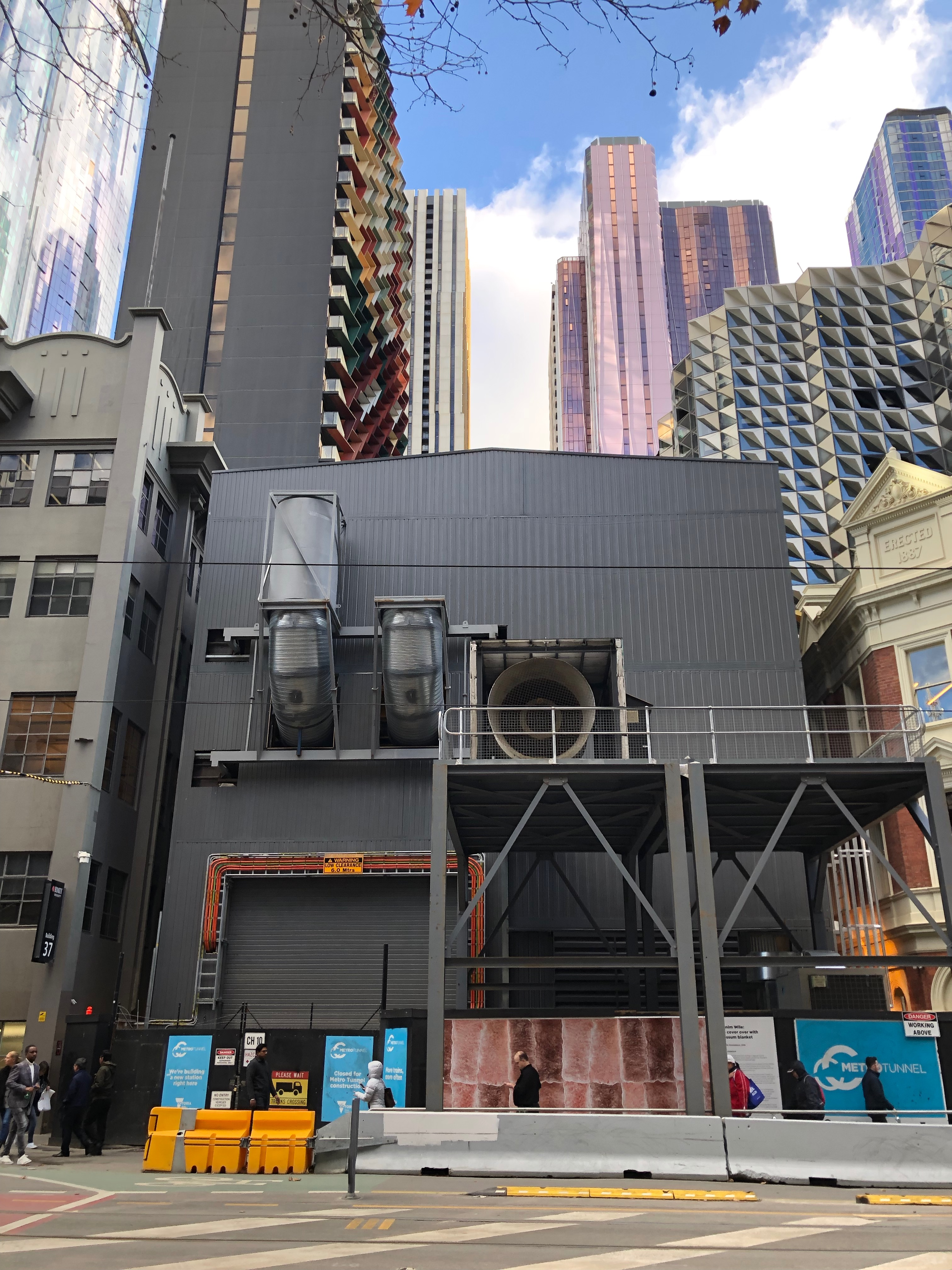
State Library station acoustic shed at A'Beckett Street, July 2019

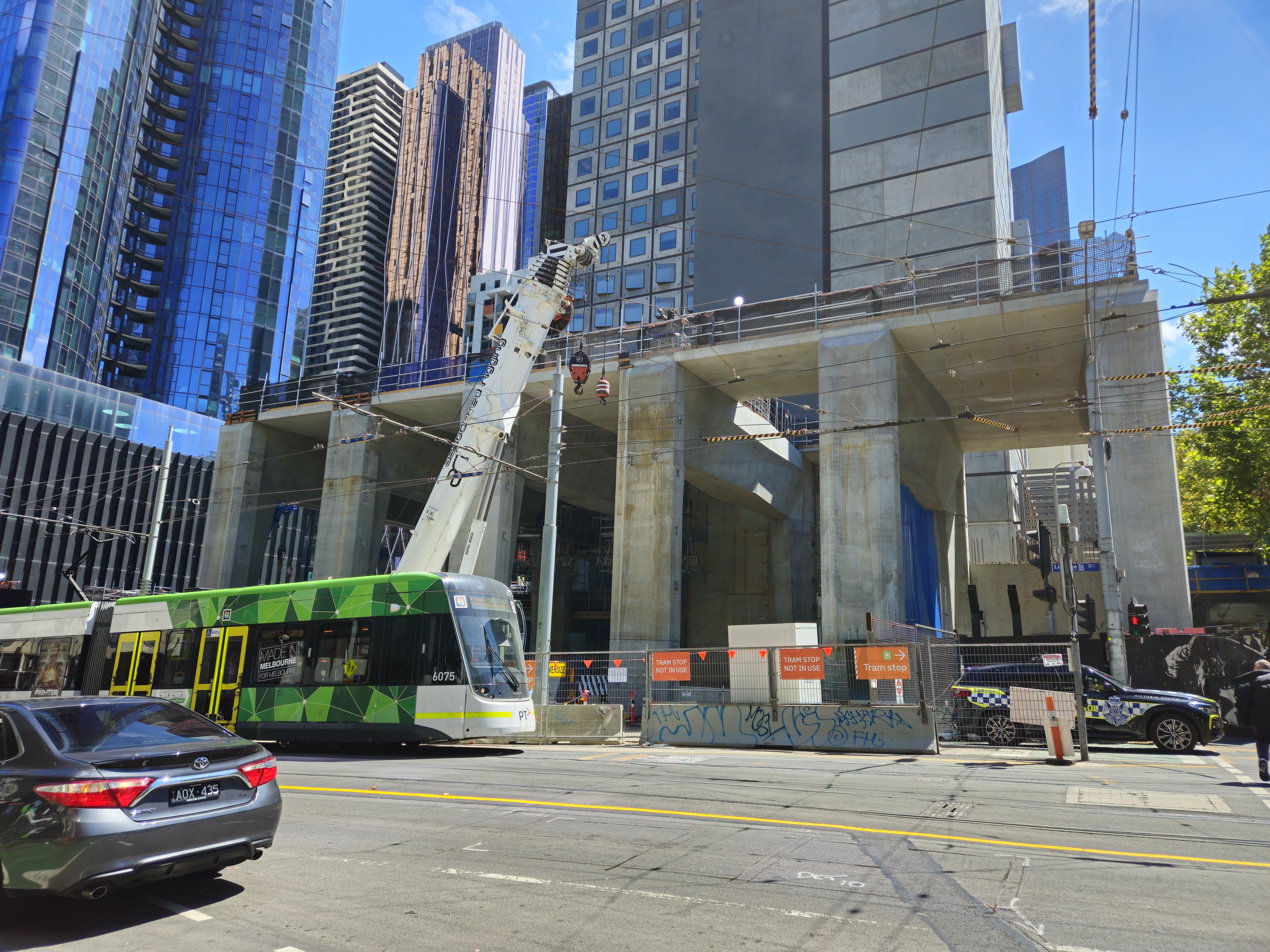
State Library station under construction,
February 2024

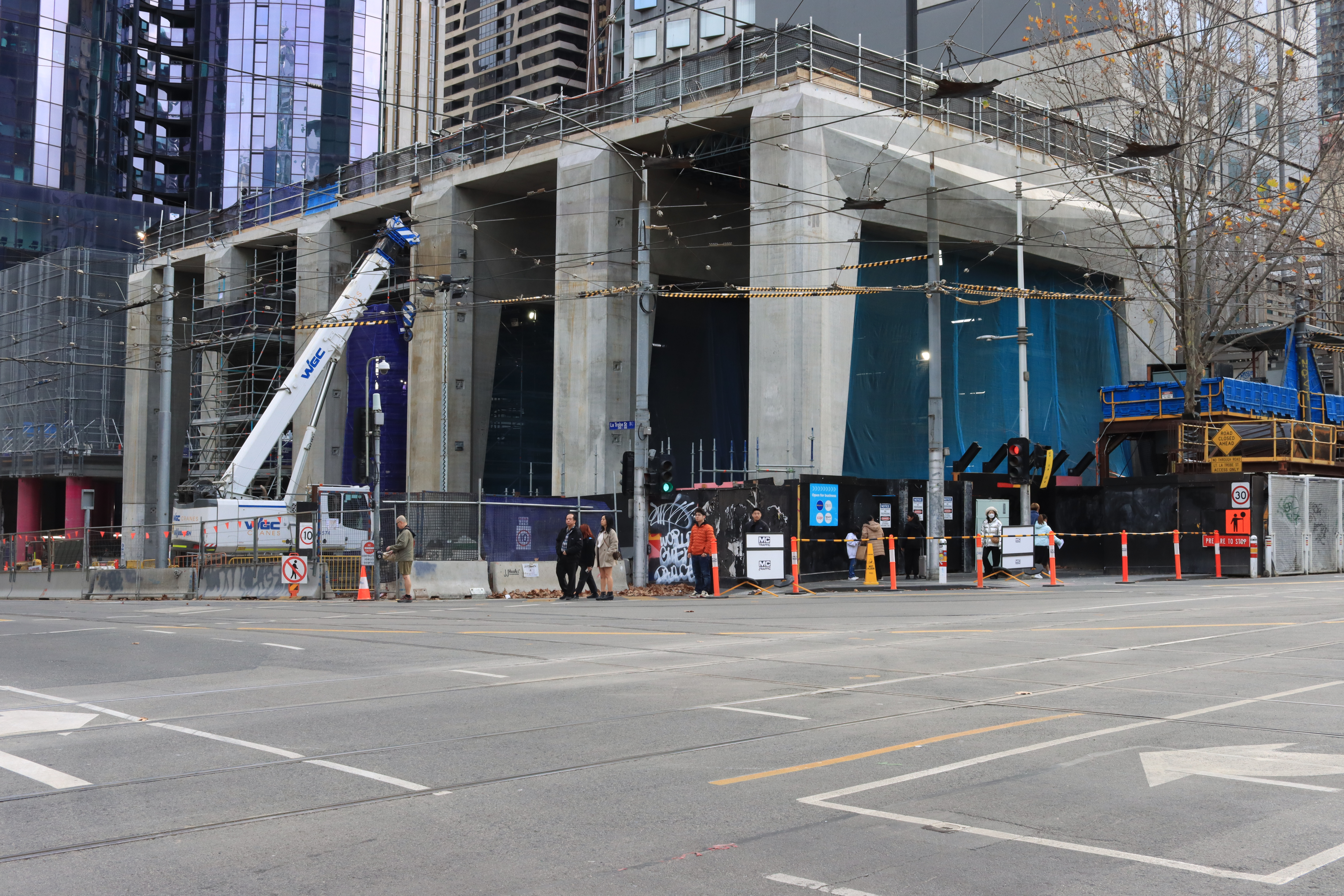
Construction progress, June 2024

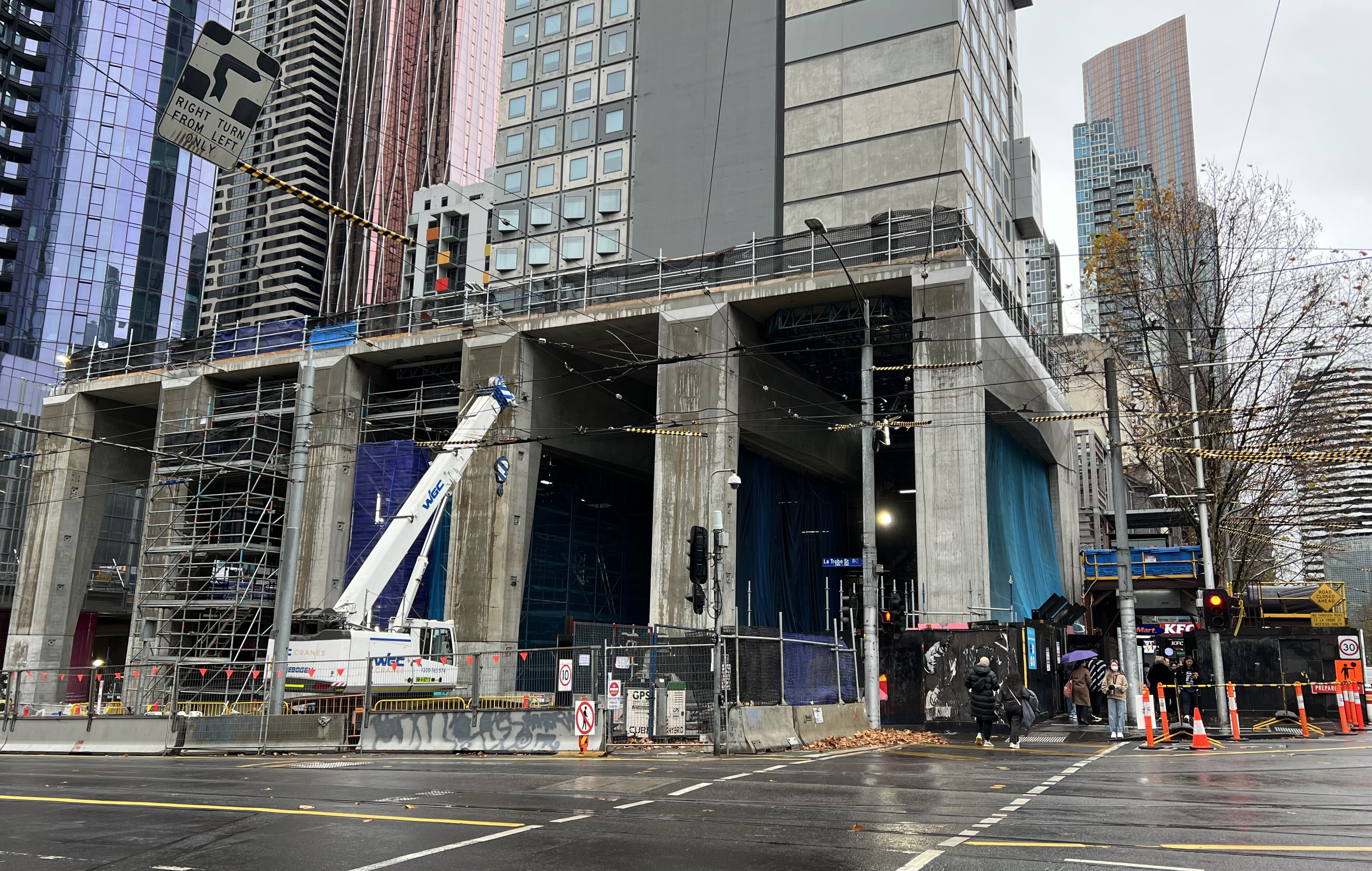
Construction progress of the main building and entrance, June 2024

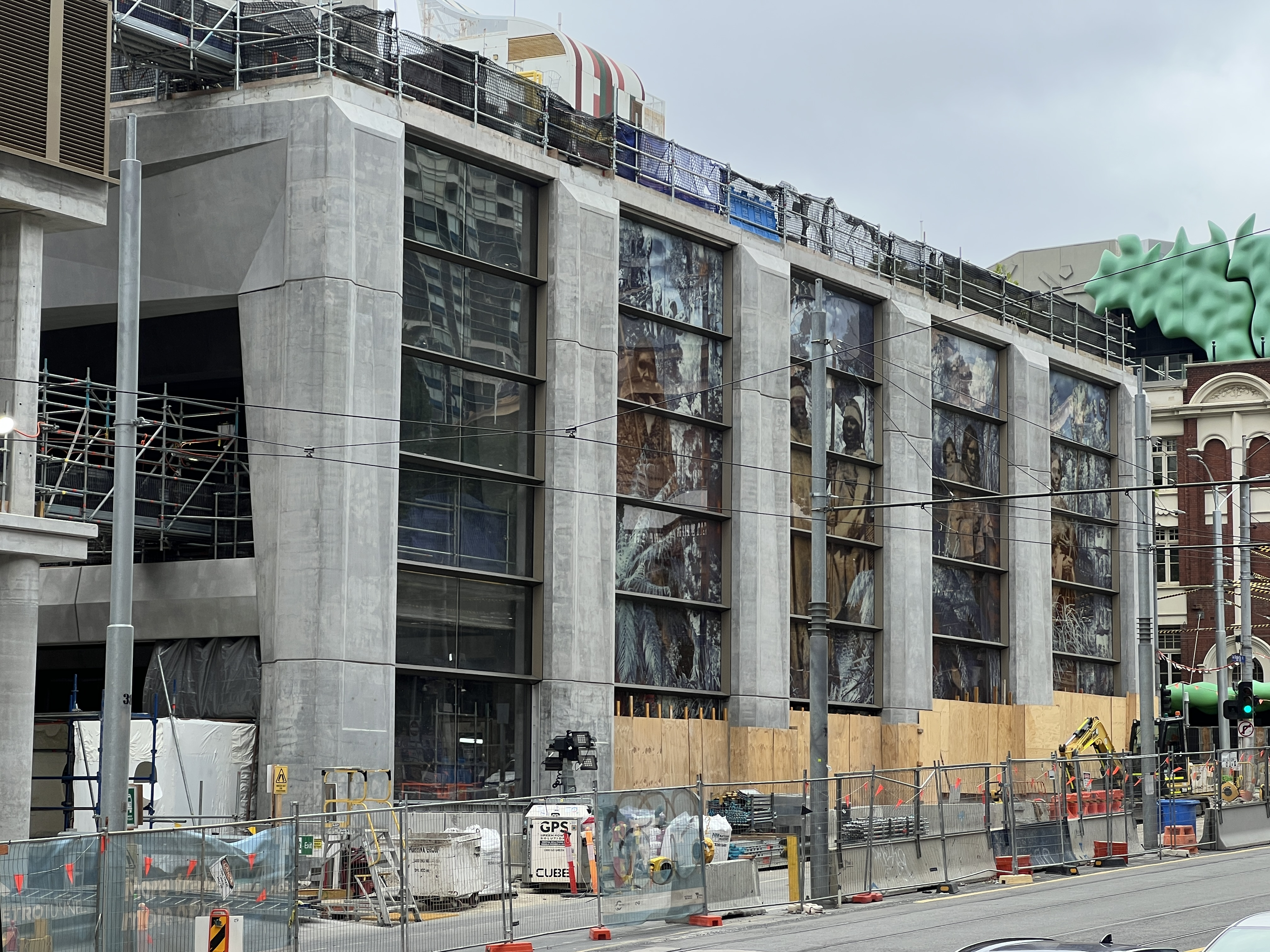
Station building and entrance under construction, March 2025

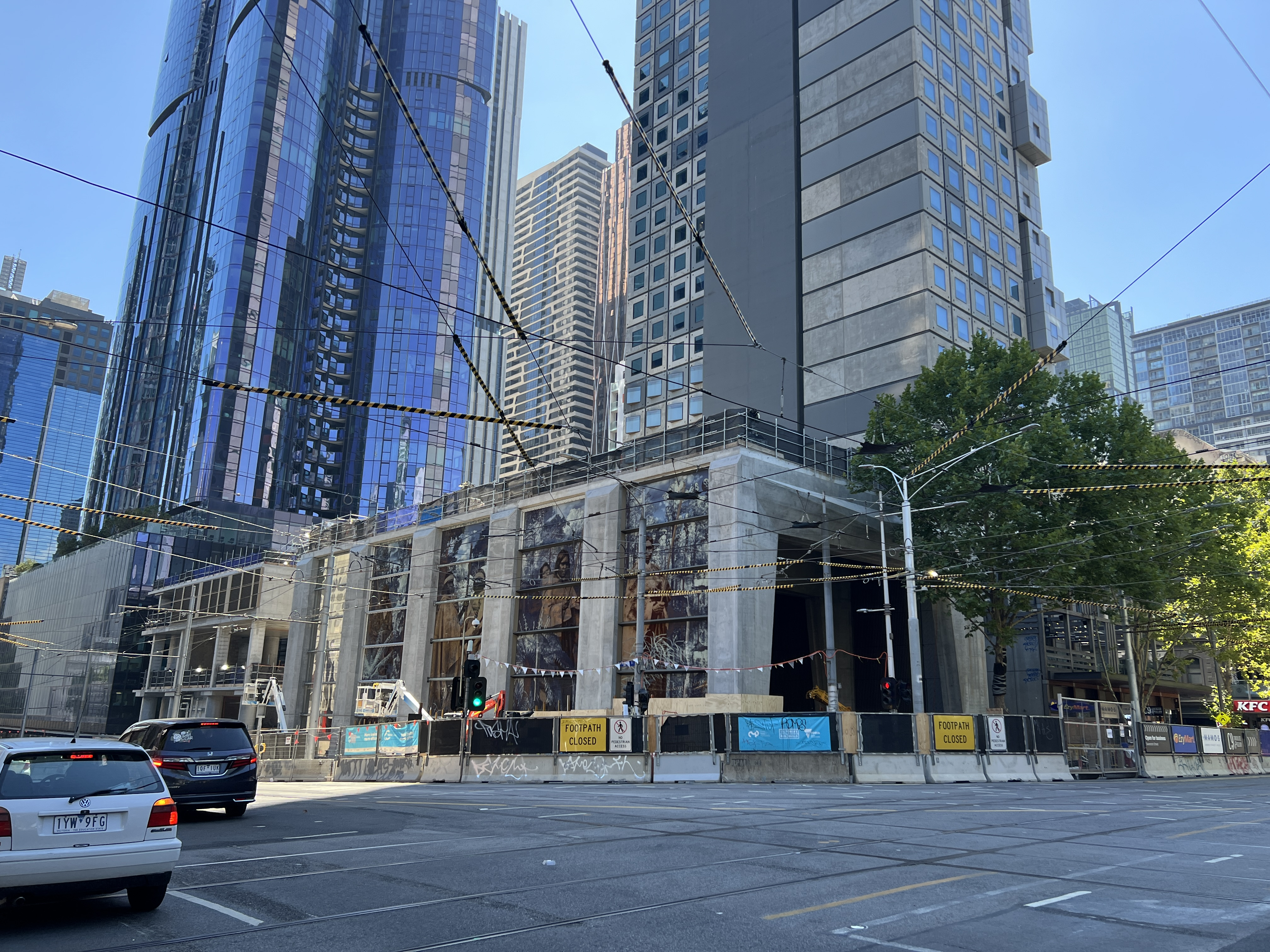
Artwork installed as part of entrance construction, March 2025

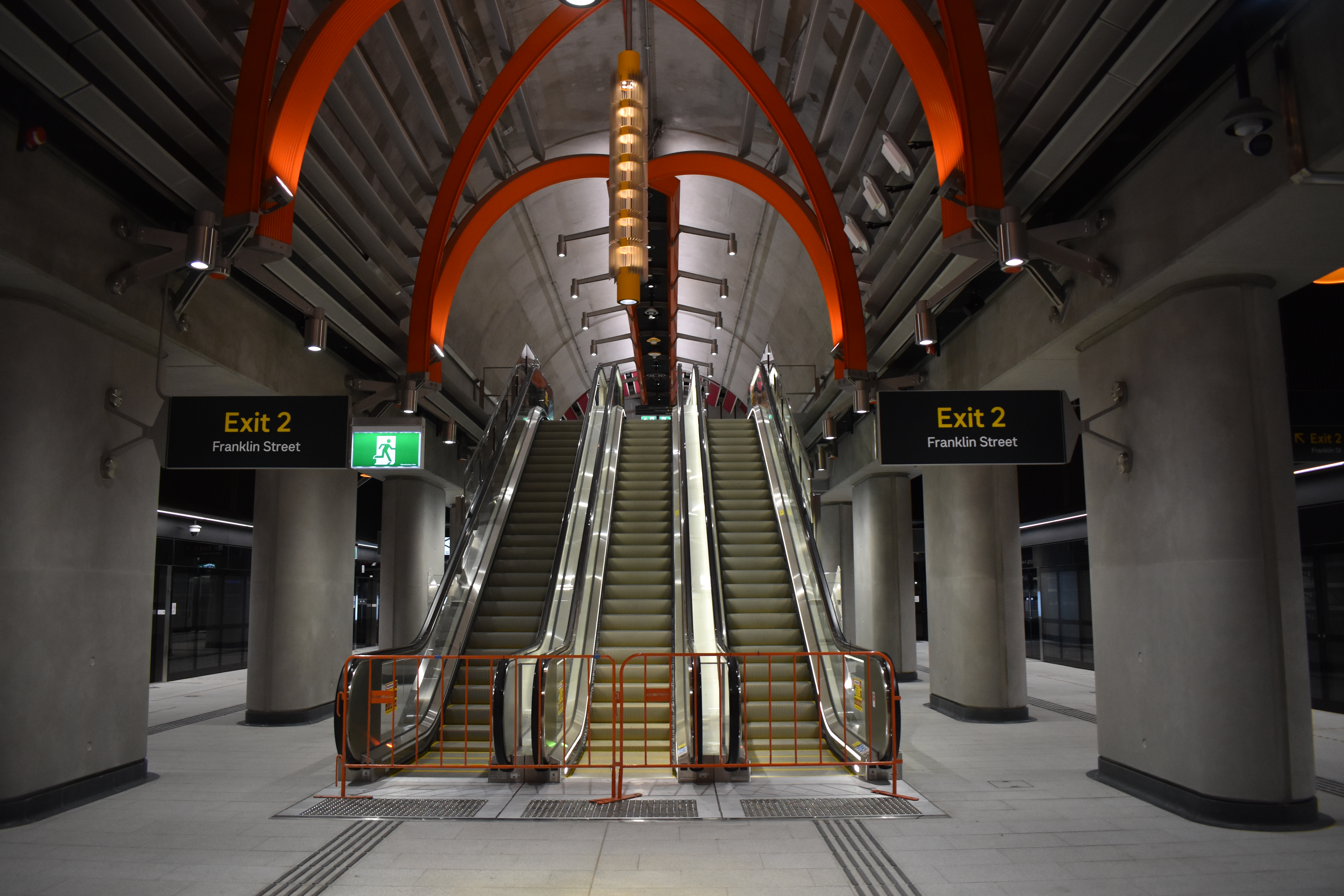
Exit to Franklin Street, October 2025

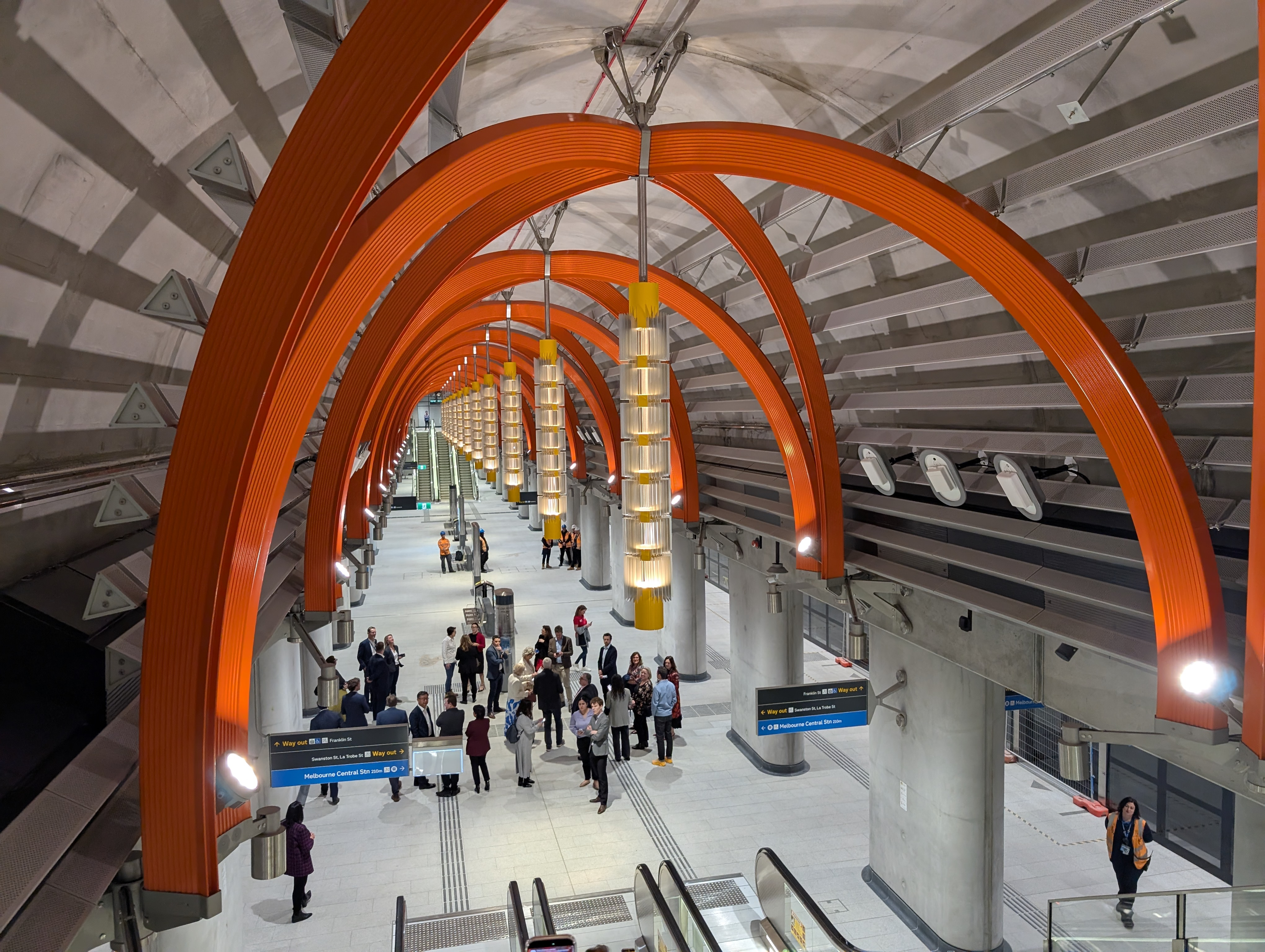
View of platform level from escalators, October 2025

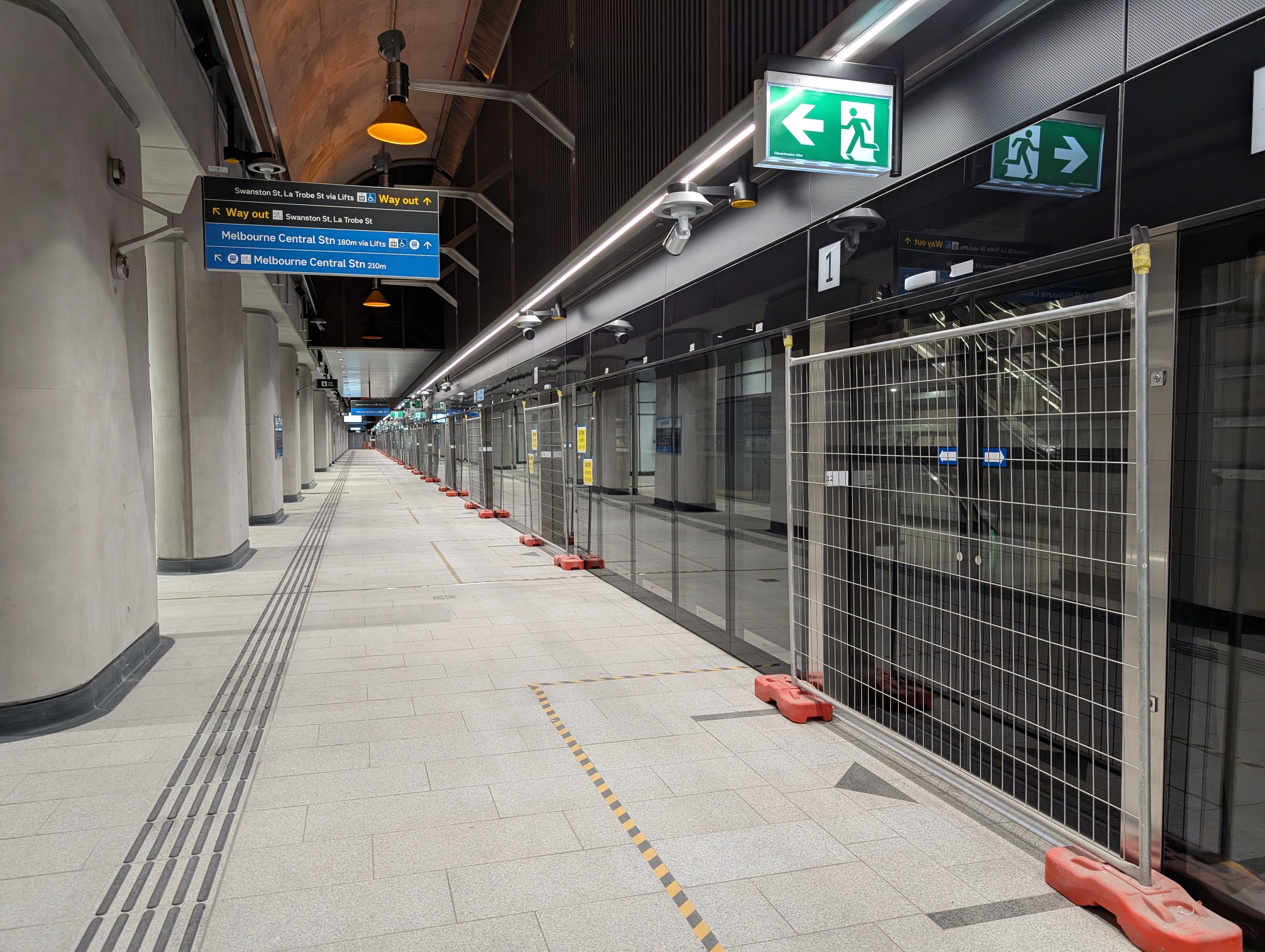
View looking along Platform 1, October 2025

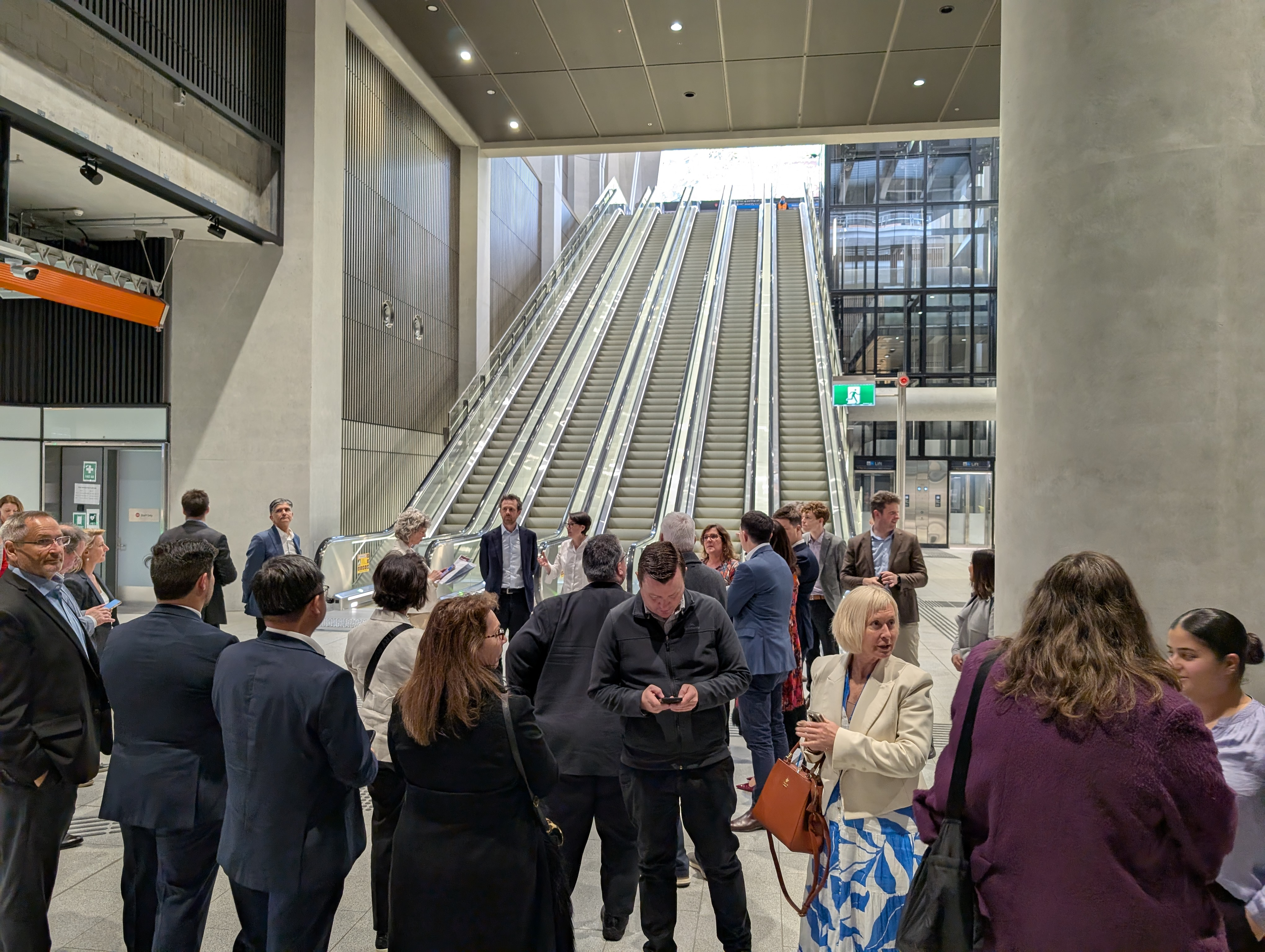
Escalators leading up to La Trobe Street near the Melbourne Central Station entrance during a tour on 7 October 2025

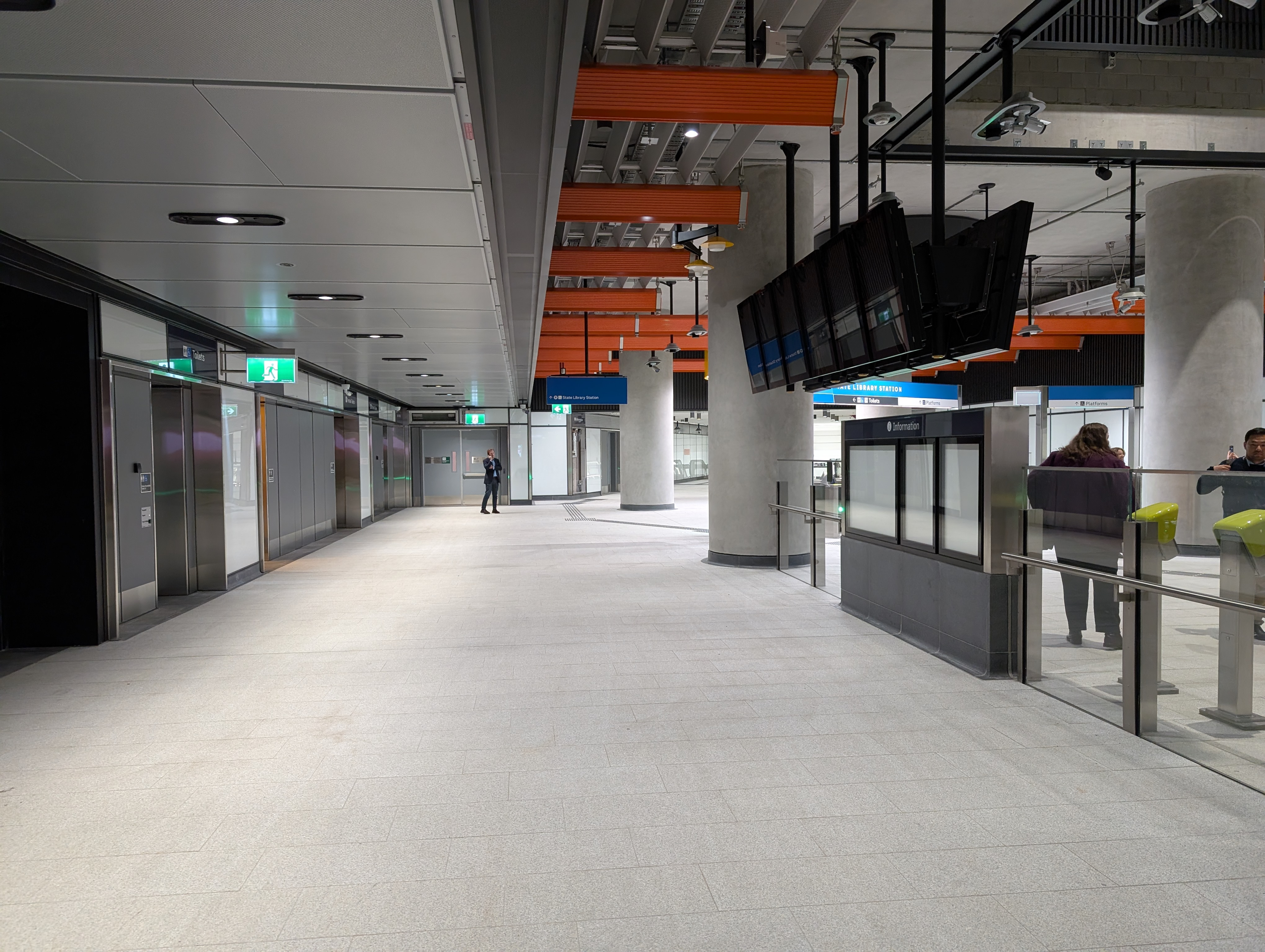
Photo showing barrier-less interchange corridor from Melbourne Central Station next to myki gates for external entrance from La Trobe Street, October 2025
