= Flagstaff Hill =

Flagstaff Hill usually refers to a hill on which a flag was erected. It may refer to:

== Place names ==
=== Australia ===
- Flagstaff Hill, near Linton, Victoria
- Flagstaff Hill, Melbourne, a hill in the historic Flagstaff Gardens, Melbourne
- Flagstaff Hill, South Australia, a suburb in Adelaide, Australia

=== China ===
- Flagstaff Hill, Tai Po, a hill in Tai Po, New Territories, Hong Kong

=== Malaysia ===
- Flagstaff Hill, one of the hills in the Penang Hill group of peaks, and a former name of the group

=== New Zealand ===
- Flagstaff Hill, New Zealand, a hill in Russell, Bay of Island, which played a role in the Flagstaff War of 1845
- Flagstaff, Otago, sometimes called Flagstaff Hill, is a prominent hill overlooking the northwest of the city of Dunedin, in New Zealand's South Island
- Observation Point, sometimes called Flagstaff Hill, is a prominent bluff in Port Chalmers, also in the South Island

=== Saint Martin ===
- A hill on the French side of the Franco-Dutch island of Saint Martin.

=== United Kingdom ===
- Flagstaff Hill, Fife

=== United States ===
- Flagstaff Hill, Alaska, a hill on Unga Island, Alaska
- Flagstaff Hill in Hill County, Montana
- Flagstaff Hill in Sheridan County, Montana
- Flagstaff Hill, Pennsylvania, an outdoor space in Schenley Park, Pittsburgh, Pennsylvania

== See also ==
- Flagstaff hill incident, a 1976 cross-border incident between Ireland and the United Kingdom
