= Parliament railway station =

Railway station in Melbourne, Australia

Parliament
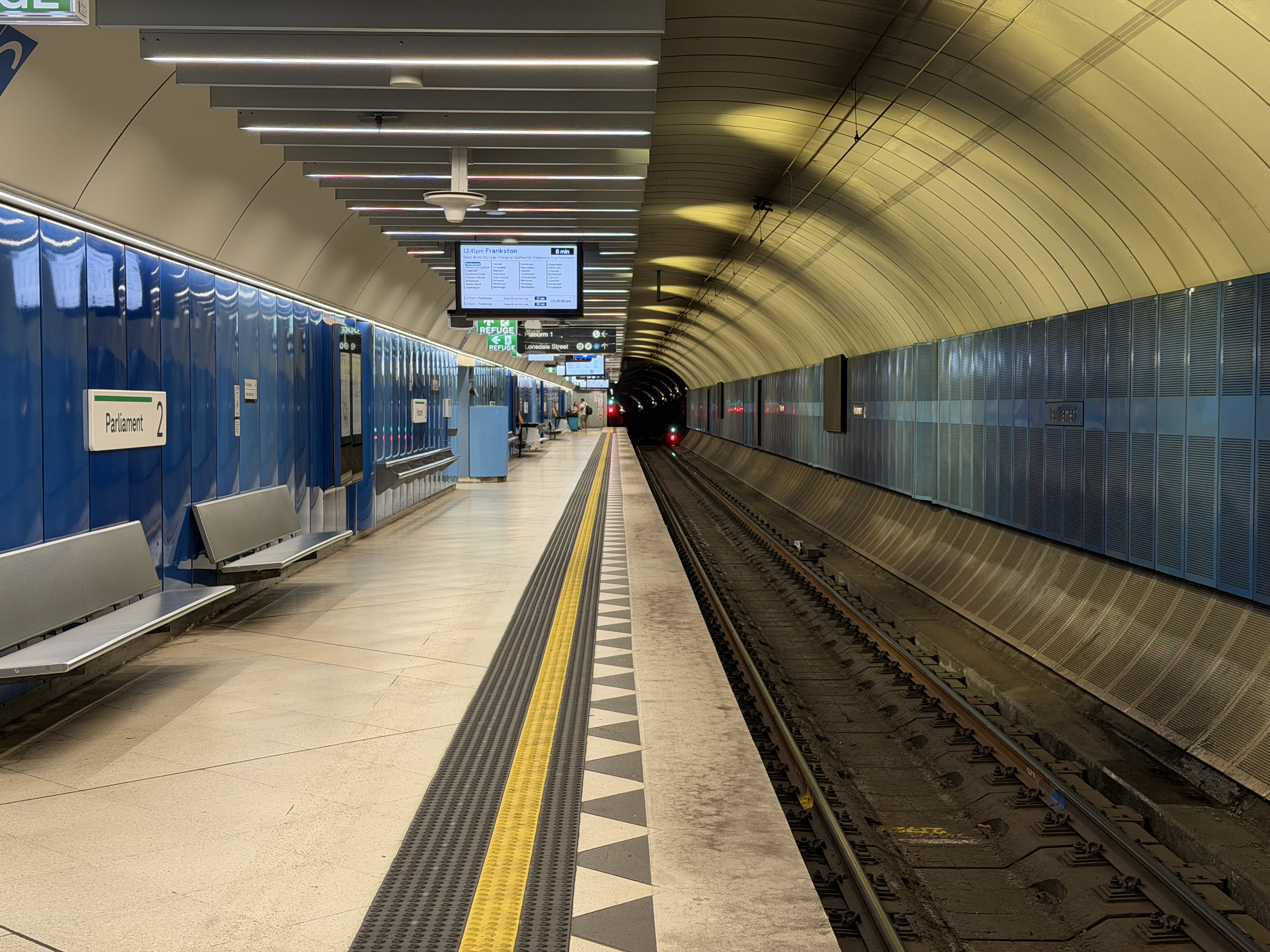
- Northbound view from Platform 2, February 2026

General information
- Location: Spring Street, Melbourne, Victoria 3000; City of Melbourne; Australia
- Coordinates: 37°48′41″S 144°58′23″E
- System: PTV commuter rail station
- Owner: VicTrack
- Operator: Metro Trains
- Lines: Hurstbridge Mernda; Frankston; Lilydale Belgrave Alamein (Note: Weekday pre-peak and post-peak only); Glen Waverley; Craigieburn Upfield
- Platforms: 4 (2 island)
- Tracks: 4
- Connections: Tram

Construction
- Structure type: Underground
- Depth: 40 m
- Platform levels: 2
- Accessible: Yes—step free access

Other information
- Status: Operational, premium station
- Station code: PAR
- Fare zone: Myki zone 1
- Website: Public Transport Victoria

History
- Opened: 22 January 1983; 43 years ago
- Electrified: 1500 V DC overhead (January 1981)

Passengers
- 2019-2020: 7.646 million ▼24.48%
- 2020-2021: 2.214 million ▼71.05%
- 2021–2022: 2.911 million ▲31.51%
- 2022–2023: 4.724 million ▲62.27%
- 2023–2024: 5.863 million ▲24.11%

Services
Preceding station	Metro Trains	Following station
Melbourne Central One-way operation	Mernda line	Jolimont towards Mernda or Hurstbridge
Melbourne Central One-way operation	Hurstbridge line	Jolimont towards Mernda or Hurstbridge
Melbourne Central towards Frankston via Flinders Street	Frankston line	Richmond One-way operation
Direction of travel on metropolitan lines below between stations on the City Loop changes to either Melbourne Central or Flinders Street depending on the line and time of day.
Melbourne Central towards Upfield or Craigieburn	Upfield line	Flinders Street Terminus
Melbourne Central towards Upfield or Craigieburn	Craigieburn line	Flinders Street Terminus
Melbourne Central towards Flinders Street	Lilydale line	Richmond towards Lilydale, Belgrave, Alamein or Glen Waverley
Melbourne Central towards Flinders Street	Belgrave line	Richmond towards Lilydale, Belgrave, Alamein or Glen Waverley
Melbourne Central towards Flinders Street	Alamein line	Richmond towards Lilydale, Belgrave, Alamein or Glen Waverley
Melbourne Central towards Flinders Street	Glen Waverley line	Richmond towards Lilydale, Belgrave, Alamein or Glen Waverley
Former services
Preceding station	Metro Trains	Following station
Pre 2026
Melbourne Central towards Flinders Street	Cranbourne line	Richmond towards East Pakenham or Cranbourne
Melbourne Central towards Flinders Street	Pakenham line	Richmond towards East Pakenham or Cranbourne
Melbourne Central towards Watergardens or Sunbury	Sunbury line	Flinders Street Terminus
Pre 2021
Melbourne Central towards Flinders Street	Sandringham line	Richmond towards Sandringham
Melbourne Central towards Werribee	Werribee line	Flinders Street Terminus
Track layout
Location

Parliament station is a railway station operated by Metro Trains Melbourne on the Burnley, Caulfield, Clifton Hill and Northern group lines, which are part of the Melbourne rail network. It serves Melbourne city centre and the suburb of East Melbourne in Victoria, Australia. Parliament is an underground premium station, featuring four platforms, two island platforms on two floors connected to street level via two underground concourses. It opened on 22 January 1983.

Parliament is one of the three underground stations on the City Loop. As of 2023-24 it carries 5.863 million passengers per year, making it the fourth-busiest station on the metropolitan network, approximately half of its usage prior to the COVID-19 pandemic.

Parliament is served by eleven lines organised into four groups. The station is also served by two tram routes on Bourke Street, four tram routes on Macarthur Street, and three tram routes on Spring Street.

Parliament station opened in 1983, and it was named after the Parliament House, which is located just east of the station. During the station's construction, the platforms of the station were built through tunneling. When the station opened, it had the longest escalator in the Southern Hemisphere but were surpassed, in 2022 and 2024, by the escalators at Airport Central station in Perth and Central Station in Sydney.

== Description ==
Parliament station is on the border of the Melbourne CBD and the suburb of East Melbourne. East of the main entrance is Macarthur Street and Spring Street, and Collins Street is to the south. The station is near Parliament House, hence the station's name. Parliament station is owned by VicTrack, a state government agency, and is operated by Metro Trains Melbourne. The station is approximately 4.3 kilometres (2.7 mi), or around a 7-minute train journey, from Flinders Street.

Parliament station has two island platforms in a two-level configuration. The platforms are approximately 160 metres (520 ft) long, which can accommodate a 7-car HCMT. In addition to the two platform levels, there are two underground concourses. The northern concourse is connected to street level via an exit on Lonsdale Street, and the southern concourse is connected to street level via an exit on Macarthur Street and two exits on Spring Street.

The station is compliant with the Disability Discrimination Act 1992 as there are lifts linking the concourse with both the platforms and street level. It has no parking facilities.

== History ==
The logo of the Melbourne Underground Rail Authority which was responsible for the construction of the City Loop

Parliament station was one of three underground stations included in the construction plan of the new City Loop, overseen by the Melbourne Underground Rail Loop Authority (MURLA), formed in 1971.

The station platforms were constructed using tunnelling methods. A pilot tunnel was made, enabling the walls to be constructed ahead of the main excavation. Each platform is an individual tunnel and is linked to the other platforms at the same level by several cross tunnels. That choice of design mean that the remaining pillar of rock between the tunnels too weak to support the required loads, so it was replaced with concrete.

The booking hall to the south was constructed "upside down", with the support columns being dug with augers from ground level, then filled with concrete. The roof was constructed over the piles from ground level, during a series of staged road closures. Once complete, the excavation of the booking hall was carried out underneath, while road traffic continued overhead. During construction, the fence around Parliament House had to be removed and stored, then re-erected.

The station opened on 22 January 1983. At the time of opening, the station had the longest escalators in the Southern Hemisphere, but they have since been surpassed by Airport Central railway station in Perth, opened in October 2022.

On 31 January 2021, a major timetable revision occurred to allow for the operation of the High Capacity Metro Trains, as well as more frequent services on both the Northern and Caulfield Groups. That included the removal of Frankston, Sandringham and Werribee lines from the City Loop.

In 2022 and early 2023, works began to upgrade safety features at the three city loop stations. In 2022, a new intruder alarm system was installed. On 6 February 2023, early works commenced for stage 2 at Parliament station, which were expected to be complete by late 2023.
The improvements include:

- Upgrading ventilation shafts
- Replacing existing ceiling panels
- Upgrading fire sprinkler systems
- Installation of new fire detection systems

On 1 February 2026, the Pakenham, Cranbourne and Sunbury were moved out of the City Loop and into the Metro Tunnel. Services on the Frankston line returned to the City Loop, accessed from the same platforms formerly used for the Cranbourne and Pakenham lines.

== Platforms and services ==
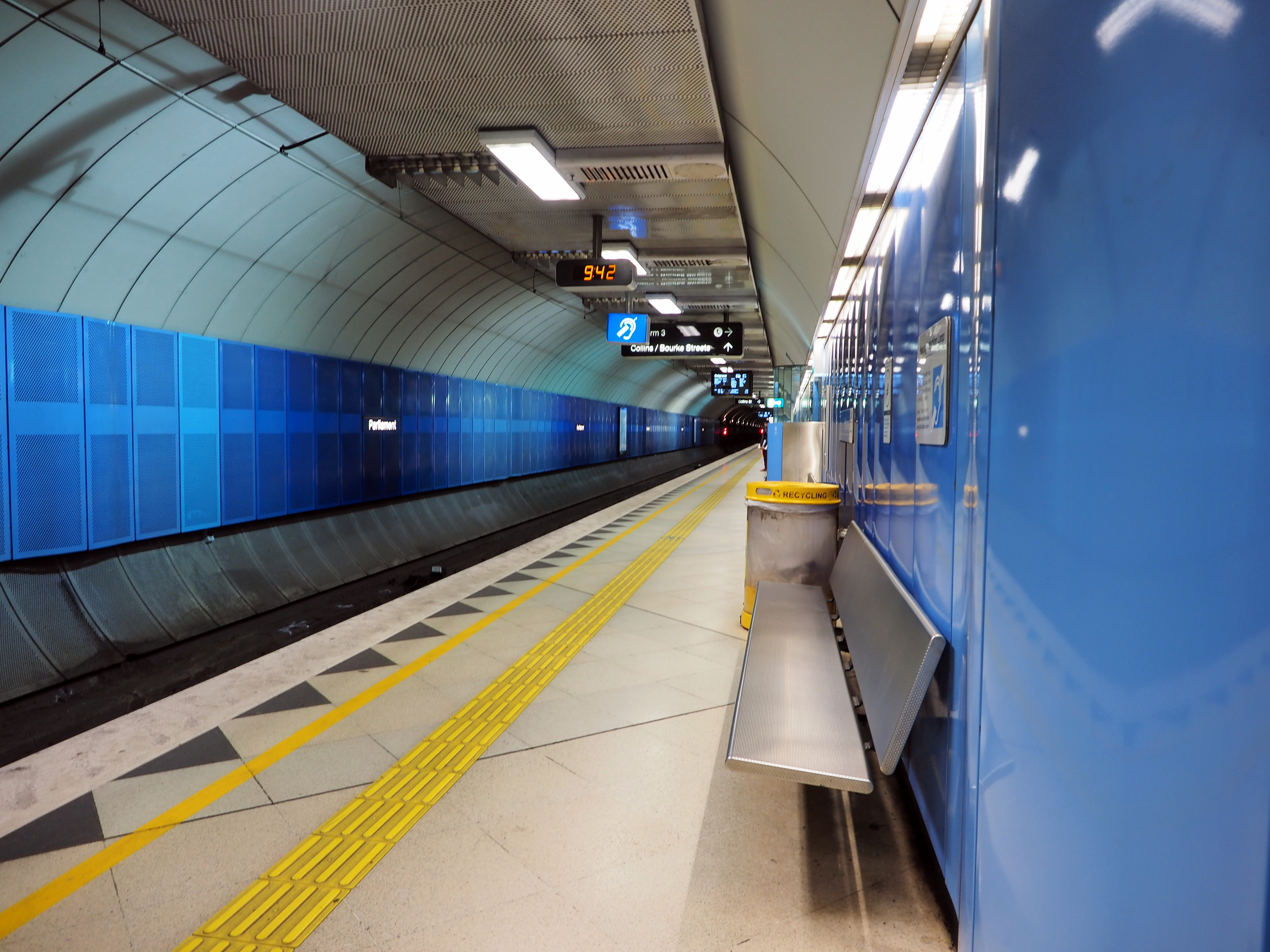
Platform 3, June 2014, prior to replacement of ceiling panels, lights and safety features

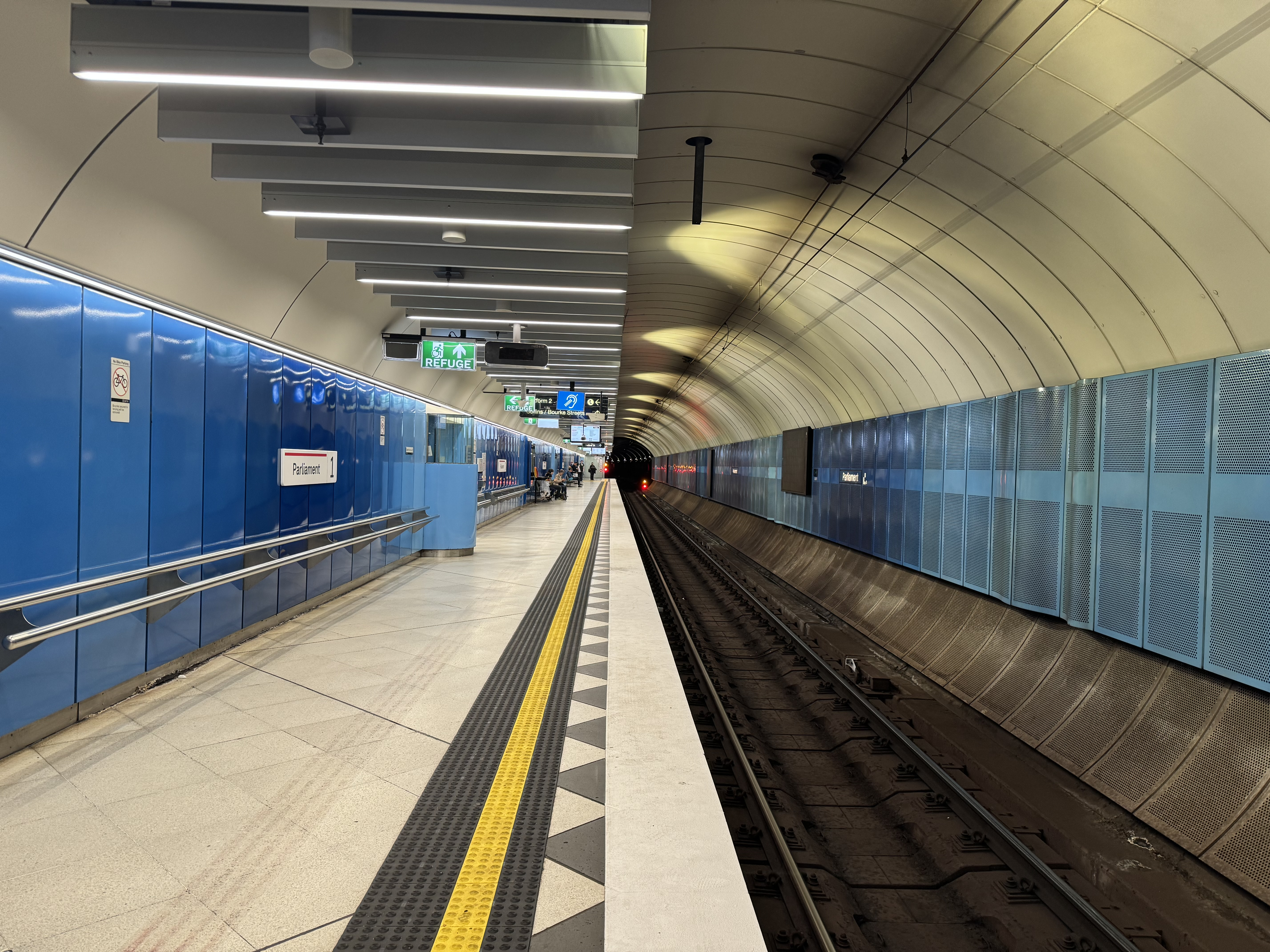
Platform 1, July 2024, after replacement of ceiling panels, lights and safety features

Parliament station is served by 11 lines which are separated into four groups and are operated by Metro Trains Melbourne.

Platform 1 is served by the Clifton Hill group, which consists of the Hurstbridge and Mernda lines. Services run clockwise, first stopping at Jolimont and then travelling together until Clifton Hill where the line splits into two.

Platform 2 is served by the Frankston line. Services operate anticlockwise through the City Loop, first travelling towards Flinders Street before going out to the suburbs.

Platform 3 is served by the Northern Group, which consists of the Craigieburn and Upfield lines. Service patterns alternate during the day between clockwise and anticlockwise operation. Services run through the loop together before splitting off at North Melbourne.

Platform 4 is served by the Burnley Group, which consists of Alamein, Belgrave, Glen Waverley and Lilydale lines. Service patterns alternate during the day between clockwise and anticlockwise operation. Services on the Burnley group split off three times, first at Burnley where the Glen Waverley line branches off, then at Camberwell where the Alamein line branches off, and Ringwood where the Belgrave and Lilydale lines split into two.

=== Station layout ===
Parliament platform arrangement
Platform	Line	Destination	Via	Service Type	Notes	Source
1	Hurstbridge line Mernda line	Macleod, Greensborough, Eltham, Hurstbridge or Mernda		All stations and limited express services	Services to Macleod and Greensborough only operate during weekday peaks.	
2	Frankston line	Cheltenham, Mordialloc, Carrum or Frankston	Flinders Street	All stations and limited express services	Services to Cheltenham, Mordialloc and Carrum only operate during weekday peaks.	
3	Craigieburn line Upfield line	Broadmeadows, Craigieburn or Upfield	Flinders Street	All stations and limited express services	Services to Broadmeadows only operate during weekday peaks.See City Loop for operating patterns.	
4	Alamein line Belgrave line Glen Waverley line Lilydale line	Glen Waverley, Alamein, Blackburn, Ringwood. Belgrave or Lilydale	Flinders Street	All stations and limited express services	Services to Alamein only operate during weekday peaks.See City Loop for operating patterns.	

== Usage ==
Passenger usage at Parliament Station between 2008 and 2024 sorted by financial year.

Parliament is the fourth-busiest station on Melbourne's metropolitan rail network.

== Transport links ==
Parliament station is served by seven tram routes, departing from four different tram stops. Route 35 serves the tram stop on Spring Street, routes 86 and 96 serve the tram stop on Nicholson Street, and routes 11, 12, 48 and 109 serve the tram stop on Macarthur Street.

Spring Street

- : City Circle

Nicholson Street

- : Waterfront City (Docklands) – Bundoora RMIT
- : St Kilda Beach – East Brunswick

Macarthur Street:

- : Victoria Harbour (Docklands) – West Preston
- : St Kilda – Victoria Gardens
- : Victoria Harbour (Docklands) – North Balwyn
- : Port Melbourne – Box Hill
