= Flagstaff railway station =

Railway station in Melbourne, Australia

Flagstaff
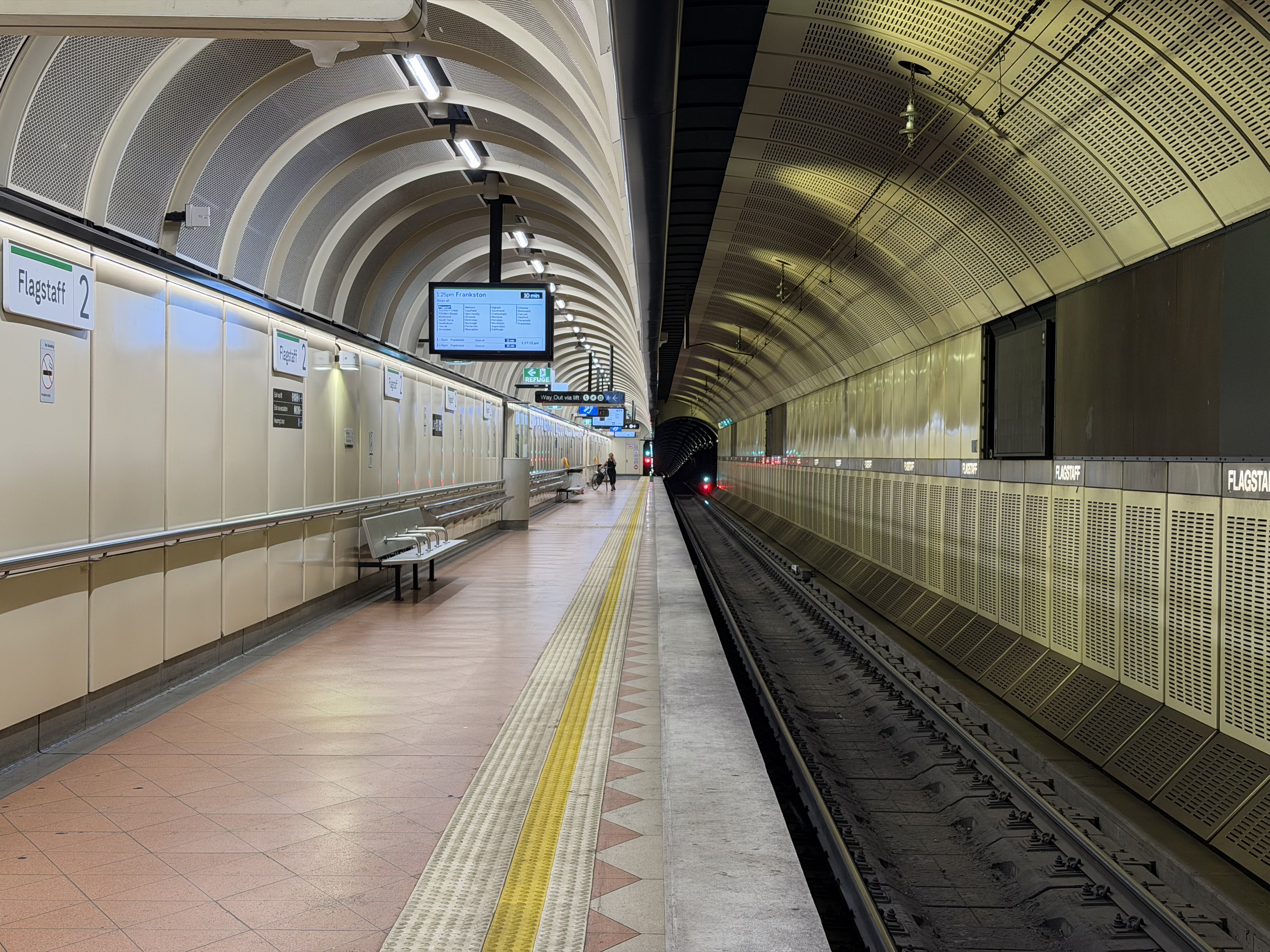
- Westbound view from Platform 2, February 2026

General information
- Location: La Trobe Street, Melbourne, Victoria 3000; City of Melbourne; Australia
- Coordinates: 37°48′43″S 144°57′22″E
- System: PTV commuter rail station
- Owner: VicTrack
- Operator: Metro Trains
- Lines: Hurstbridge Mernda; Frankston; Lilydale Belgrave Alamein (Note: Weekday pre-peak and post-peak only); Glen Waverley; Craigieburn Upfield
- Platforms: 4 (2 island)
- Tracks: 4
- Connections: Tram

Construction
- Structure type: Underground
- Depth: 32 m
- Platform levels: 2
- Accessible: Yes—step free access

Other information
- Status: Operational, premium station
- Station code: FGS
- Fare zone: Myki zone 1
- Website: Public Transport Victoria

History
- Opened: 27 May 1985; 41 years ago
- Electrified: January 1981 (1500 V DC overhead)

Passengers
- 2019-2020: 3.883 million ▼20.01%
- 2020-2021: 1.378 million ▼64.52%
- 2021–2022: 1.682 million ▲22.04%
- 2022–2023: 2.758 million ▲64.02%
- 2023–2024: 3.435 million ▲24.54%
- 2024–2025: 3.445 million ▲0.29%

Services
Preceding station	Metro Trains	Following station
Southern Cross One-way operation	Mernda line	Melbourne Central towards Mernda or Hurstbridge
Southern Cross One-way operation	Hurstbridge line	Melbourne Central towards Mernda or Hurstbridge
Southern Cross towards Frankston via Flinders Street	Frankston line	Melbourne Central One-way operation
Direction of travel on metropolitan lines below between stations on the City Loop changes to either Southern Cross or Melbourne Central depending on the line and time of day.
Southern Cross towards Flinders Street	Lilydale line	Melbourne Central towards Lilydale, Belgrave, Alamein or Glen Waverley
Southern Cross towards Flinders Street	Belgrave line	Melbourne Central towards Lilydale, Belgrave, Alamein or Glen Waverley
Southern Cross towards Flinders Street	Alamein line	Melbourne Central towards Lilydale, Belgrave, Alamein or Glen Waverley
Southern Cross towards Flinders Street	Glen Waverley line	Melbourne Central towards Lilydale, Belgrave, Alamein or Glen Waverley
North Melbourne towards Upfield or Craigieburn	Upfield line	Melbourne Central towards Flinders Street
North Melbourne towards Upfield or Craigieburn	Craigieburn line	Melbourne Central towards Flinders Street
Former services
Preceding station	Metro Trains	Following station
Pre-2026
Southern Cross towards Flinders Street	Cranbourne line	Melbourne Central towards Cranbourne or East Pakenham
Southern Cross towards Flinders Street	Pakenham line	Melbourne Central towards Cranbourne or East Pakenham
North Melbourne towards Watergardens or Sunbury	Sunbury line	Melbourne Central towards Flinders Street
Pre-2021
Southern Cross towards Flinders Street	Sandringham line	Melbourne Central towards Sandringham
North Melbourne towards Werribee	Werribee line	Melbourne Central towards Flinders Street
Track layout
Location

Flagstaff station is a railway station operated by Metro Trains Melbourne on the Burnley, Caulfield, Clifton Hill and Northern group lines, which are part of the Melbourne rail network. It serves the Melbourne city centre in Victoria, Australia. Forming part of the City Loop, the station was opened on 27 May 1985.

It is located near the north-western corner of the CBD, under La Trobe and William streets, and takes its name from the nearby Flagstaff Hill, a significant site in Melbourne's early colonial history. The station serves Melbourne's legal district and Flagstaff Gardens.

== History ==
The station, which has four levels to a maximum depth of 32 metres (105 ft), was largely constructed by excavation. Because the site was a geological "sandwich" of basalt, silt and Silurian mudstone bedrock, the construction of the lower and upper platforms as separately driven tunnels was impossible.

Instead, the station platforms consist of two chambers linked by cross tunnels, each having two platforms on top of each other. The side of each chamber was made up of two drift tunnels, one at the top and one at the bottom. They were then linked by 228 vertically raise bored shafts, 1 metre (3 ft 3 in) in diameter and 3 metres (9 ft 10 in) apart. The shafts and drifts were then filled with concrete, and formed the side skeleton of the station chambers. The arch of each chamber was then constructed across the top of the two side walls, the material below the arch being excavated down to the bottom of the side walls, with temporary cross struts added between the raise bored columns, until the permanent elements were added. That innovative method resulted in a $1 million saving in construction costs.

Flagstaff was the last station to open on the City Loop. Although trains had run through the station site since 24 January 1981, when the Loop began operating, Flagstaff did not open to passengers until 27 May 1985.

Initially, the City Loop did not operate on Sundays. That was changed following the introduction of Sunday trading but, at the same time that the other two underground loop stations opened on Sundays, Flagstaff station had its Saturday services cancelled. That was due to its proximity to business-related buildings such as the Commonwealth Law Complex, banks and major office buildings, which were usually closed on weekends and public holidays.

After a number of residential developments had been built in the area, the station was scheduled to open on weekends from June 2015, with both the Labor and Liberal parties having committed to that at the 2014 Victorian state election. However, that was deferred until 1 January 2016.

In May 2017, CDC Melbourne operated bus route 605 to Gardenvale from Flagstaff Station.

As of 2023-24, Flagstaff is the seventh-busiest station on Melbourne's metropolitan network, with 3.435 million passengers.

On 1 February 2026, the Pakenham, Cranbourne and Sunbury were moved out of the City Loop and into the Metro Tunnel. Services on the Frankston line returned to the City Loop, accessed from the same platforms formerly used for the Cranbourne and Pakenham lines.

== Facilities ==
Flagstaff is sited under the intersection of La Trobe and William streets. There are two entrances: via a lift or escalator south of La Trobe Street, and by stairs on the north. There are three underground levels. The concourse level has a ticket office, ticket-operated gates, toilets, a news stand and a hot snack shop, with the four platforms on the two levels below, each level having an island platform. The levels are linked by lifts, escalators and stairs. The four platforms serve a separate group of rail lines that leave the loop and radiate out into the suburbs.

== Station layout ==
G
Street level
Entrances/Exits
C
Concourse
Customer service, toilets
P
Plant Room
Staff only
L1
Platforms
Platform 1
- ← Mernda line towards Mernda (Melbourne Central)
- ← Hurstbridge line towards Hurstbridge (Melbourne Central)
Island platform, doors will open on the left
Platform 2
Frankston line towards Frankston (Southern Cross) →
L2
Platforms
Platform 3
- ← Craigieburn line towards Craigieburn (Melbourne Central or Southern Cross) →
- ← Upfield line towards Upfield (Melbourne Central or Southern Cross) →
Island platform, doors will open on the left or right
Platform 4
- ← Lilydale line towards Lilydale (Melbourne Central or Southern Cross) →
- ← Belgrave line towards Belgrave (Melbourne Central or Southern Cross) →
- ← Glen Waverley line towards Glen Waverley (Melbourne Central or Southern Cross) →
- ← Alamein line peak services towards Alamein (Melbourne Central or Southern Cross) →

== Usage ==
Passenger usage at Flagstaff Station between 2008 and 2024 sorted by financial year.

Flagstaff is the seventh-busiest station on Melbourne's metropolitan rail network.

== Transport links ==
Route number	From	To	Stop location
Melbourne tram route 30	St Vincent's Plaza	Docklands Stadium	La Trobe Street
Melbourne tram route 35	The District Docklands	The District Docklands	La Trobe Street
Melbourne tram route 58	West Coburg	Toorak	William Street
