= Flagstaff Hill (Alaska) =

Hill in the United States of America

Highest point
- Elevation: 13 ft (4.0 m)
- Prominence: 13 ft (4.0 m)
- Coordinates: 55°10′53″N 160°30′26″W

Geography
- Location: Unga Island, Alaska, United States
- Topo map: USGS Port Moller A-2

Flagstaff Hill is a hill on Unga Island, Alaska, United States. Its name comes from the fact that there was a flagpole on the hill. The name may also be connected to the nearby Flagstaff Mine.

Flagstaff Hill is on the northern side of the entrance to the island's Delarof Bay. The hill, near the settlement of Unga, had an elevation of up to 80 feet (24 m) in 1916, when the United States Coast Pilot published it in a summary of coastal features.

The United States Coast and Geodetic Survey first published information on Flagstaff Hill in 1916. The name was entered into the U.S. National Geodetic Survey's Geographic Names Information System on March 31, 1981.
