= Lake Flagstaff =

Salt lake in Western Australia

- Location in Western Australia
- Interactive map of Lake Flagstaff
- Location: Western Australia
- Coordinates: 33°30′35″S 117°15′40″E
- Type: Salt lake
- Catchment area: 23,000 ha (57,000 acres)
- Basin countries: Australia
- Max. length: 1.9 km (1.2 mi)
- Max. width: 1.3 km (0.81 mi)
- Surface area: 223 ha (550 acres)
- Average depth: 0 to 1.8 m (0.0 to 5.9 ft)
- Shore length^{1}: 5.2 km (3.2 mi)
- ^{1} Shore length is not a well-defined measure.

Lake Flagstaff, sometimes referred to as Flagstaff Lake is an ephemeral salt lake in the Great Southern region of Western Australia, approximately 21 km (13 mi) north west of Woodanilling and 28 km (17 mi) south west of Wagin.

== Description ==
The oval shaped lake has a surface area of 223 ha (550 acres) and is one of a line of three lakes; Lake Charling to the west then Queerearrup Lake and Lake Flagstaff in the east. When they overflow waters discharge into the poorly described eastern branch of the Beaufort River. The same channel that usually provides inflow also flows away from the lakes at the same time when the lake is full (as occurs at Lake Ewlyamartup).

The lake is part of a series of swamps' lakes and large floodplain in the middle of the Beaufort river catchment and Blackwood River basin. The features of the landscape include alluvial plains, small lunettes, dunes and swales on alluvial and aeolian deposits. The lake is situated along a major ancient drainage line. The catchment has an average annual rainfall of 462 mm (18.2 in) and an annual evaporation of 1,826 mm (71.9 in). The northern shore of the lake is part of a crown reserve with an area of 1,047 acres (424 ha) designated for the protection of native fauna and flora.

== History ==
The traditional owners of the area are the Noongar peoples who have inhabited the region for tens of thousands of years.

The lakes area was pioneered by the Douglas family. Joe Douglas and his five sons all selected land there in the 1890s, building homesteads and farming.

== See also ==
- List of lakes of Australia § Western Australia
