= Richmond railway station, Melbourne =

Railway station in Melbourne, Australia

Richmond
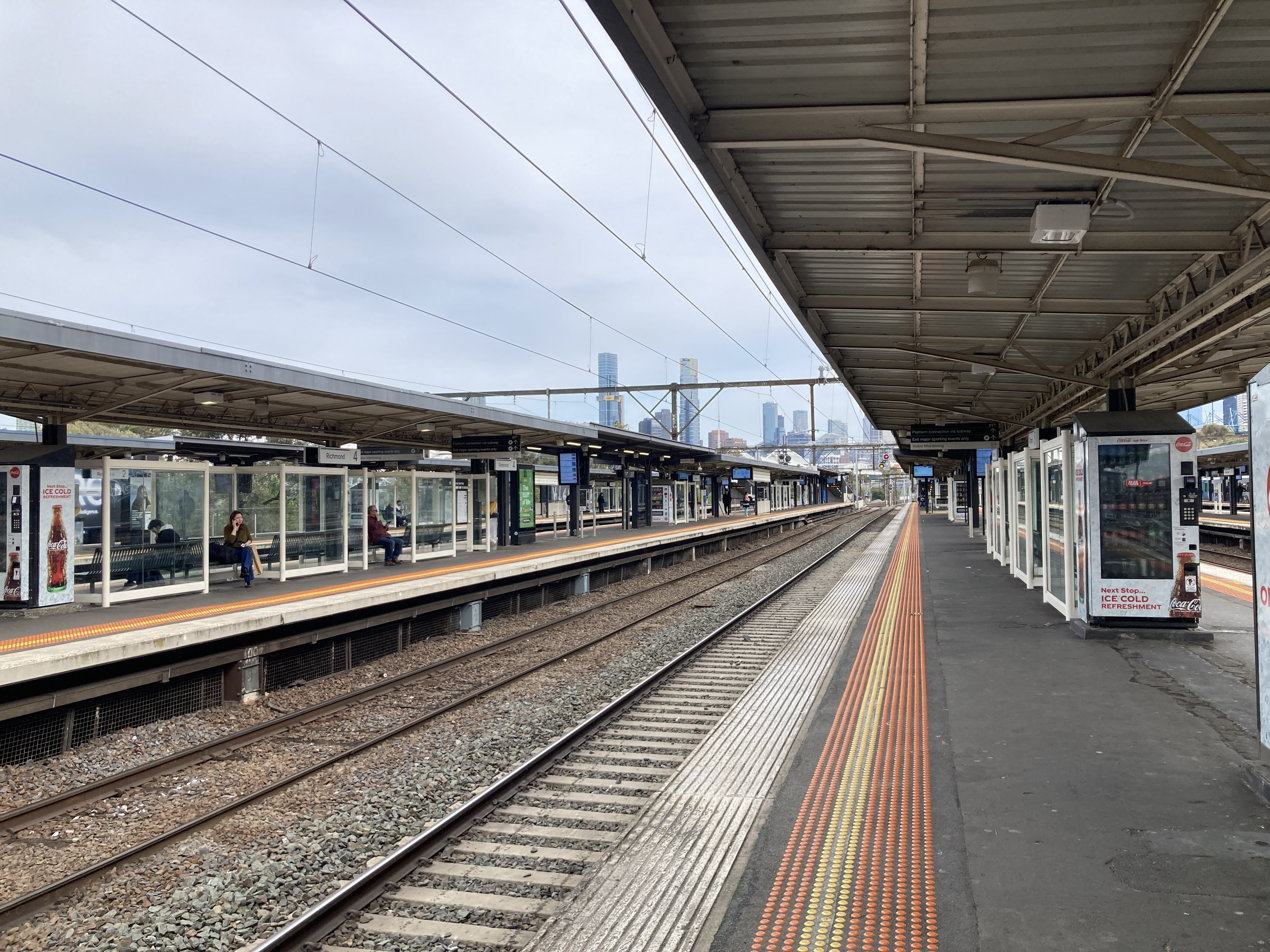
- Westbound view from Platform 5, September 2024

General information
- Location: Punt Road, Richmond, Victoria 3121; City of Melbourne; City of Yarra; Australia
- Coordinates: 37°49′25″S 144°59′20″E
- System: PTV commuter and regional rail station
- Owner: VicTrack
- Operator: Metro Trains
- Lines: Alamein (Note: Peak only): Belgrave Glen Waverley; Lilydale; Frankston; Sandringham; Gippsland
- Distance: 3.80 kilometres from Southern Cross
- Platforms: 10 (5 island)
- Tracks: 10
- Connections: Bus; Tram

Construction
- Structure type: Elevated
- Accessible: No—steep ramp

Other information
- Status: Operational, premium station
- Station code: RMD
- Fare zone: Myki zone 1
- Website: Public Transport Victoria

History
- Opened: 8 February 1859; 167 years ago
- Rebuilt: December 1859; Mid 1880s Late 1950s
- Electrified: May 1919 (1500 V DC overhead)
- Former names: Punt Road (1859); Swan Street (1859–1866)

Passengers
- 2018–2019: 4,227,000
- 2019–2020: 2,965,500 ▼29.84%
- 2020–2021: 1,292,650 ▼56.41%
- 2021–2022: 1,966,800 ▲52.15%
- 2022–2023: 3,105,850 ▲57.91%
- 2023–2024: 3,722,400 ▲19.85%
- 2024–2025: 3,712,750 ▼0.26%

Services
Preceding station	Metro Trains	Following station
See City Loop for operating patterns
Flinders Street or Parliament towards Flinders Street	Alamein line Peak only	East Richmond towards Alamein, Lilydale, Belgrave or Glen Waverley
Flinders Street or Parliament towards Flinders Street	Lilydale line	East Richmond towards Alamein, Lilydale, Belgrave or Glen Waverley
Flinders Street or Parliament towards Flinders Street	Belgrave line	East Richmond towards Alamein, Lilydale, Belgrave or Glen Waverley
Flinders Street or Parliament towards Flinders Street	Glen Waverley line	East Richmond towards Alamein, Lilydale, Belgrave or Glen Waverley
Parliament towards Flinders Street via City Loop	Frankston line	South Yarra towards Frankston
Direct to Flinders Street
Flinders Street towards Laverton, Werribee or Williamstown via Flinders Street	Sandringham line	South Yarra towards Sandringham
Preceding station	V/Line	Following station
Flinders Street towards Southern Cross	Gippsland line	Caulfield towards Traralgon or Bairnsdale
Former services
Preceding station	Metro Trains	Following station
Parliament towards Flinders Street via City Loop	Cranbourne line	South Yarra towards East Pakenham or Cranbourne
Parliament towards Flinders Street via City Loop	Pakenham line	South Yarra towards East Pakenham or Cranbourne
Track layout
Location

Richmond station is a railway station operated by Metro Trains Melbourne and V/Line, on the metropolitan Alamein, Belgrave, Frankston, Glen Waverley, Lilydale, and Sandringham lines, and the regional Gippsland line. It is part of the Melbourne and Victorian rail networks. It serves the inner eastern suburb of Richmond, in Melbourne, Victoria, Australia.

Richmond station is an elevated premium station and major junction, featuring ten platforms: five island platforms with two faces each. It opened on 8 February 1859, with the current station provided in the late 1950s.

Initially opened as Punt Road, the station was renamed two times. The station was renamed to Swan Street on 12 December 1859, then it was given its current name of Richmond on 1 January 1867.

== History ==
Richmond station has been relocated and rebuilt four times. The first station was at ground level, and opened on 8 February 1859 as Punt Road. It closed in the same year, on 12 December. On the same day, a new station called Swan Street, also at ground level, opened. It was re-named Richmond on 1 January 1867. In 1885, an elevated station was opened just north of Swan Street, with six platforms.

By the 1930s, the station was struggling to cope with patronage. The 1940 Ashworth Improvement Plan recommended that it be rebuilt, but funding problems during World War II prevented that from happening. The station had also deteriorated to the point that it was condemned by the local council. In the 1950s, work began on a replacement, as part of Operation Phoenix, the postwar rebuilding of the Victorian Railways. However, it was not until 26 March 1960 that the present station was completed. Located slightly west of the previous station, the bridges at each end of the station, across Punt Road and Swan Street, were also rebuilt to accommodate the ten tracks. For a time, platforms at both the old and new stations were used, before the original station was closed and demolished.

In 1973, the flyover for the down Burnley local line was built at the up end of Platforms 9 and 10, with the junction to the east of Platforms 7, 8, 9 and 10 abolished in the same year.

Richmond station was the filming location for the opening scene of the 1992 Australian film Romper Stomper where it was used as a stand-in for Footscray station.

In 1994, major re-signalling works occurred between Richmond and South Yarra. On 4 December 1996, Richmond was upgraded to a premium station.

During 2015, the verandahs on all platforms were lengthened and roofs installed over the ramps leading to the pedestrian subway at the up end of the station. The additional verandahs filled in the gaps between the existing verandahs, giving passengers coverage against inclement weather and to reduce overcrowding.

During the 2018-2019 financial year, it was the ninth-busiest station in metropolitan Melbourne, with 4.17 million boardings per year.

== Platforms, facilities and services ==
Richmond has ten platforms: five island platforms with two faces each. It is built on an embankment immediately east of Punt Road, with platforms extending west across the Punt Road railway bridge. The station is connected by three subways, with access to the platforms by ramps. There are no lifts at the station.

The station is located in Melbourne's sporting precinct. A special-events entrance at the western end is opened during events at the Melbourne Cricket Ground, Melbourne Park and AAMI Park.

It is serviced by Metro Trains' Alamein, Belgrave, Frankston, Glen Waverley, Lilydale and Sandringham line services, and V/Line's Gippsland line services.

Richmond platform arrangement
Platform	Line	Destination	Via	Service type	Notes	Source
1	Sandringham line	Laverton, Werribee or Williamstown	Flinders Street	All stations	Services to Laverton and Williamstown only operate on weekdays.	
2	Sandringham line	Sandringham		All stations		
3	Frankston line	Flinders Street	City Loop	All stations	All services run to Flinders Street via the City Loop except during night network	
4	Frankston line	Cheltenham, Mordialloc, Carrum or Frankston		All stations and limited express services	Services to Cheltenham, Mordialloc and Carrum only operate during weekday peaks.	
5	Gippsland line	Southern Cross	Flinders Street		Set down only	
6	Gippsland line	Traralgon or Bairnsdale			Pick up only	
7	Alamein line (Weekday peak hours only); Glen Waverley Line; Lilydale line	Flinders Street		All stations	All services run direct to Flinders Street	
8	Alamein line (Weekday peak hours only); Belgrave Line; Lilydale line	Flinders Street	City Loop	All stations	See City Loop for operating patterns	
9	Alamein line (Weekday peak hours only); Belgrave Line Glen Waverley Line; Lilydale line	Alamein, Blackburn, Ringwood, Mooroolbark, Lilydale, Upper Ferntree Gully, Belgrave or Glen Waverley		All stations and limited express services		
10	Alamein line (Weekday peak hours only); Glen Waverley Line; Lilydale line	Glen Waverley, Alamein, Blackburn, Ringwood or Lilydale		All stations and limited express services	Only used on weekdays and during night network	

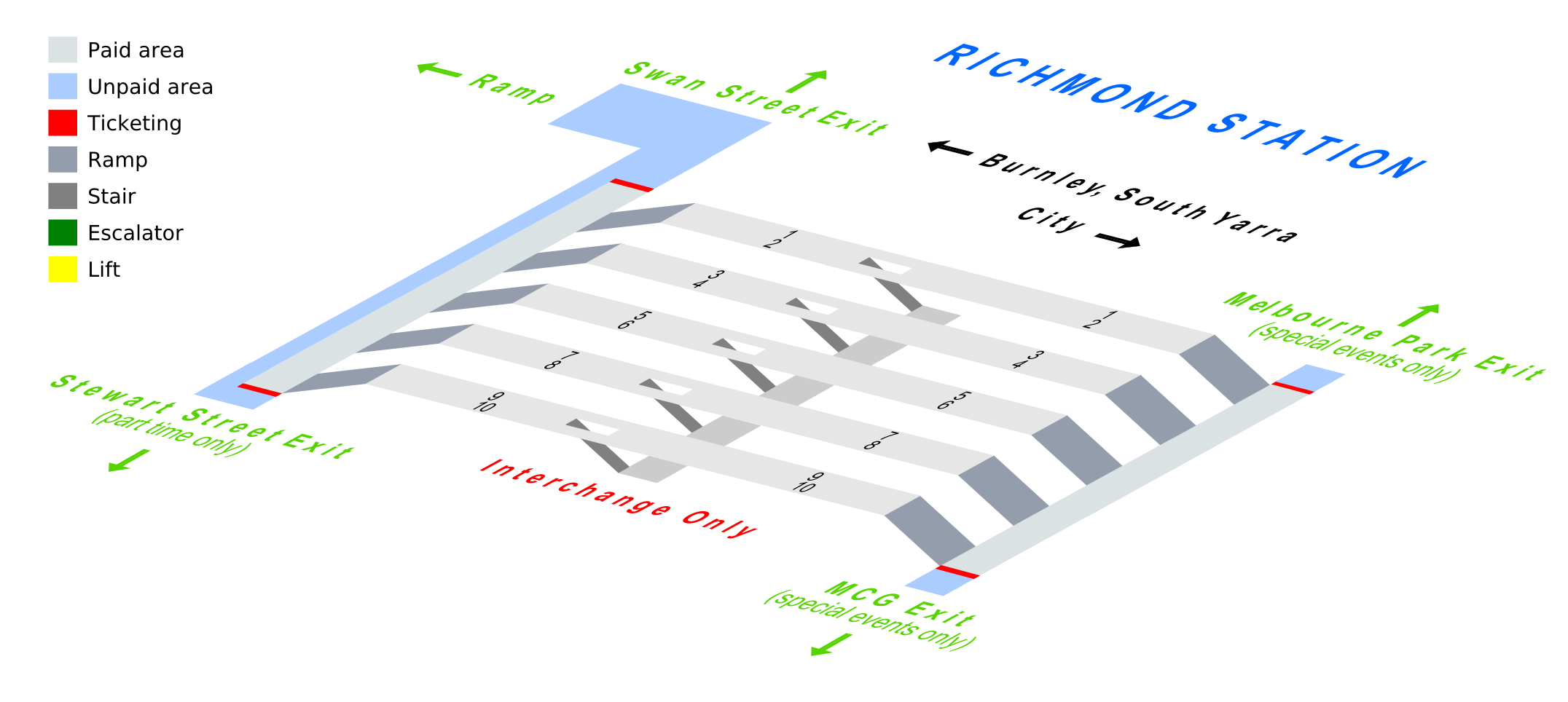
Schematic diagram of the station

== Transport links ==
Kinetic Melbourne operates one bus route via Richmond station, under contract to Public Transport Victoria:

- 246 : Elsternwick station – Clifton Hill

Yarra Trams operates one route via Richmond station:

- : Waterfront City Docklands – Wattle Park

== Usage ==
A chart showing passenger usage at Richmond Station between 2008 and 2024 sorted by financial year.

In 2023-24 financial year, Richmond was the sixth-busiest station on Melbourne's metropolitan network.

== Gallery ==
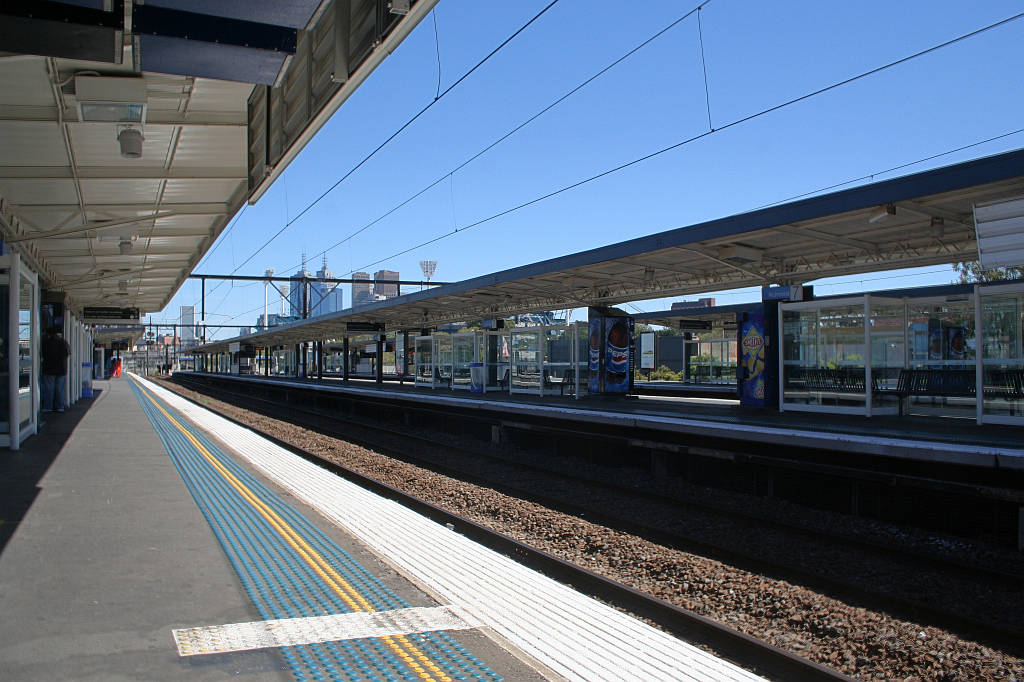
Westbound view from Platform 6, with the now replaced Sydney style blue and yellow tactile, which were replaced with the regular orange and yellow tactile in mid-2010s, March 2008

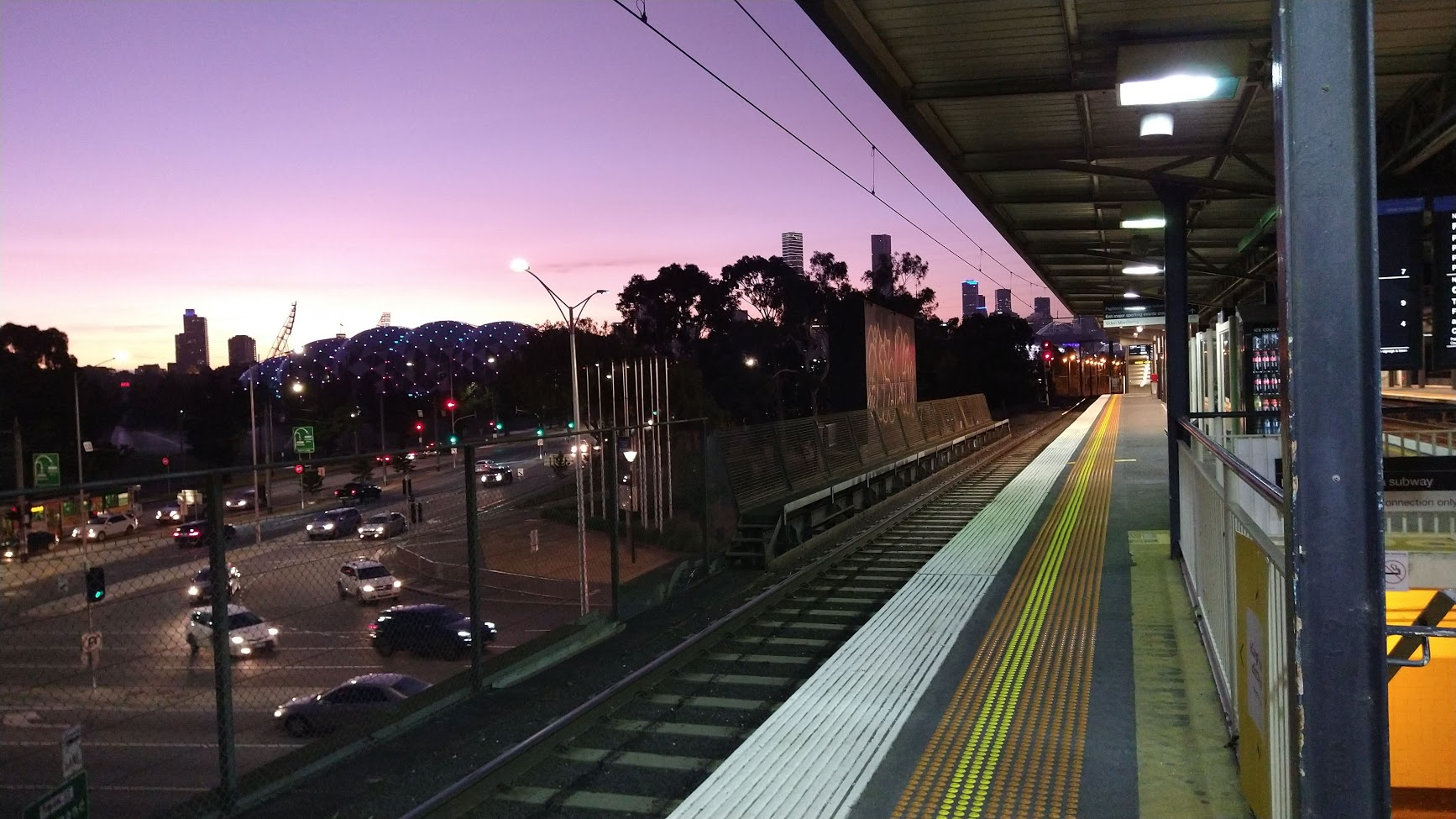
Westbound view from Platform 1, January 2021. The junction of Punt Road and Olympic Boulevard is to the left, with AAMI Park in the distance

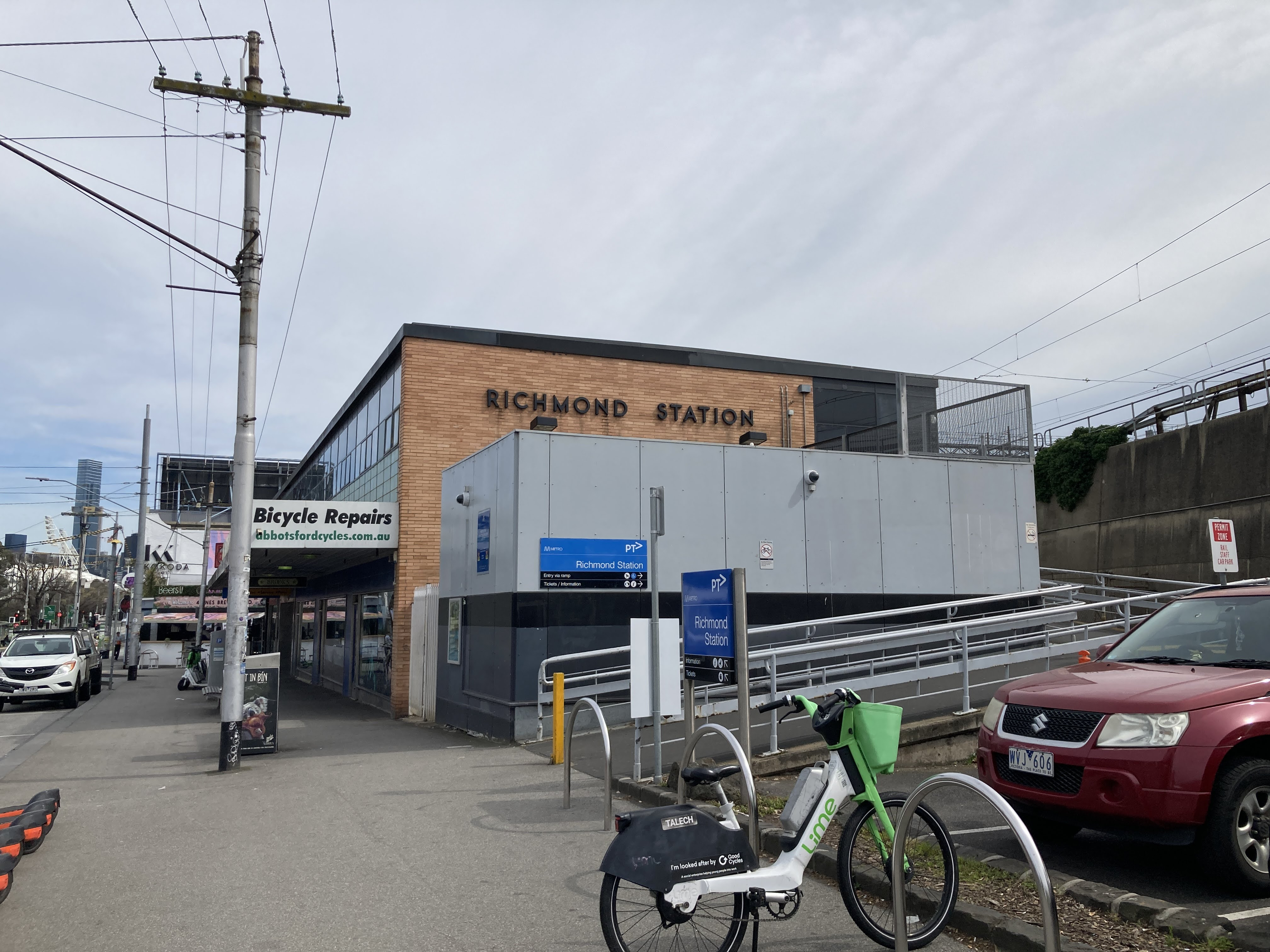
The exterior building and entrance on the southern side of the station, September 2024

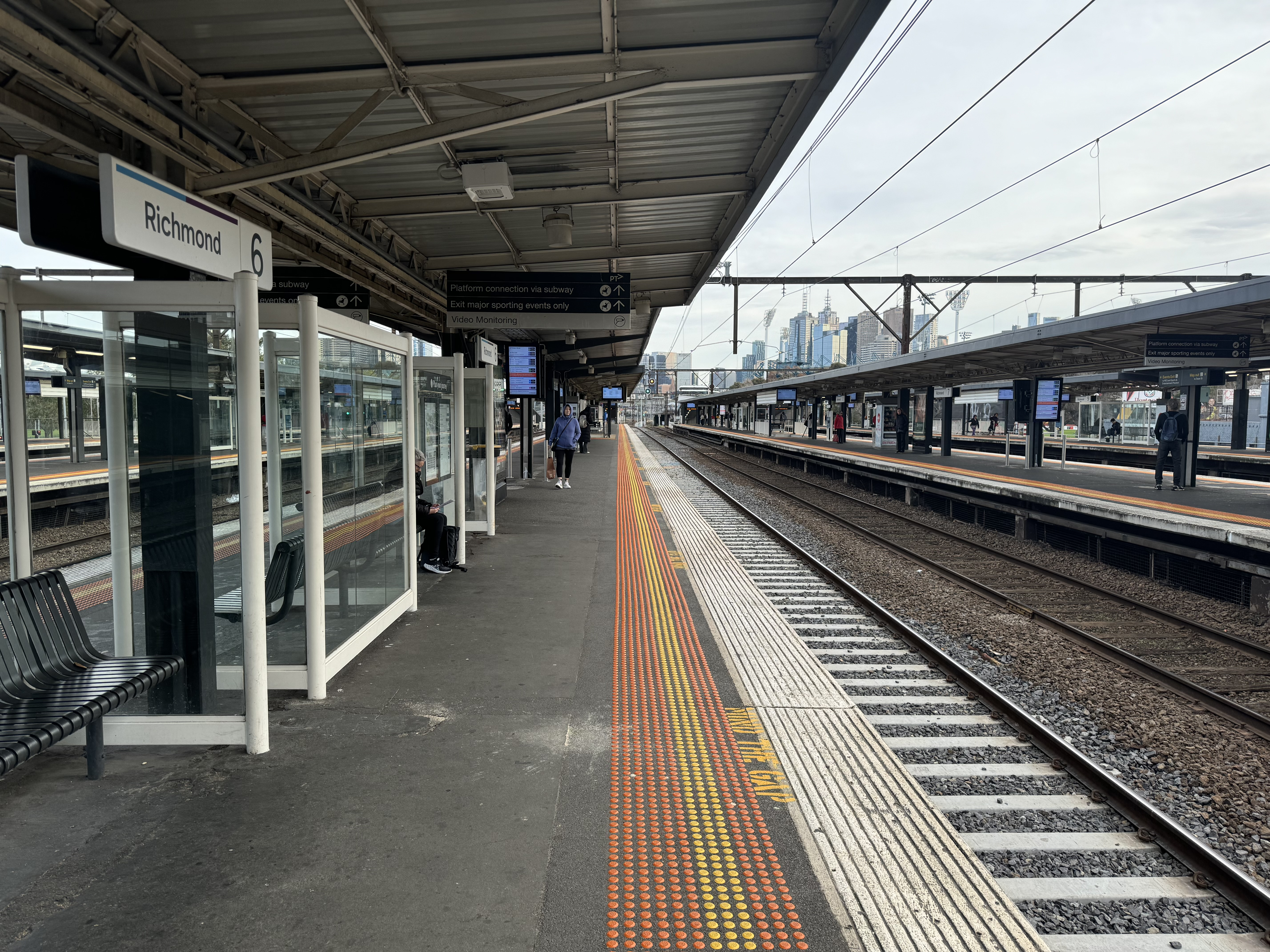
Westbound view from Platform 6, July 2024
