= Flagstaff Mountain (Stevens County, Washington) =

Mountain in Washington, USA

- Location within Washington (state)

Highest point
- Elevation: 4,255 ft (1,297 m)
- Prominence: 1,655 ft (504 m)
- Isolation: 5.74 mi (9.24 km)
- Coordinates: 48°54′31″N 117°52′07″W

Geography
- Location: Stevens County, Washington, United States
- Parent range: Columbia Mountains
- Topo map(s): USGS 7.5' topographic map Northport, Washington

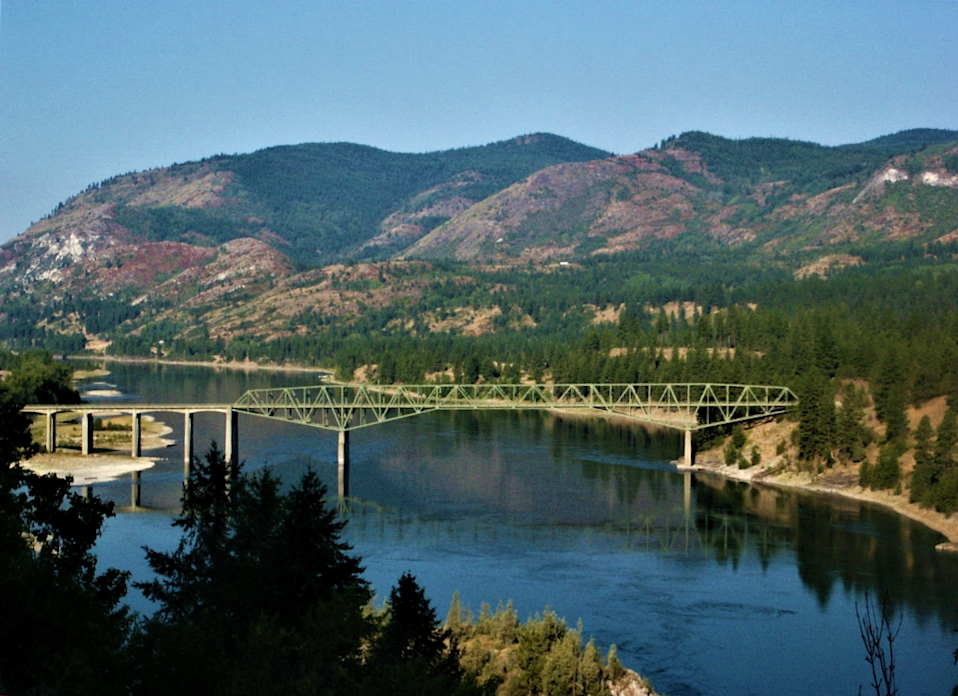
Flagstaff Mountain, Washington looking ~south across the Northport bridge over the Columbia River

Flagstaff Mountain is a large mountain located southwest of Northport, Washington. The peak has an elevation of 4,255 ft (1,297 m) with over 3,000 ft (910 m) of vertical relief above the valley below. Flagstaff Mountain is composed of Paleozoic sedimentary and intrusive igneous rocks that have been complexly metamorphosed, faulted, and eroded to reveal the rugged landform observed today. The Hubbard and Flagstaff Mountain Barite mines near the summit represent some of the rich mining history in this region geologists refer to as the Kootenay Arc.
