= List of Metro Trains Melbourne railway stations =

The Melbourne railway network comprises 17 railway lines organised into six groups and is operated by Metro Trains Melbourne. The first section of the network opened in 1854, making the Melbourne metropolitan rail network the oldest rail system in Australia. Most of the network is above ground, with the main underground sections being the City Loop and Metro Tunnel.

These 17 lines consist of 16 electrified lines and 1 diesel shuttle service. The electrified lines are the Alamein, Belgrave, Glen Waverley and Lilydale lines which are part of the Burnley Group, the Cranbourne, Sunbury and Pakenham lines which are part of the Caulfield Group, the Hurstbridge and Mernda lines which are part of the Clifton Hill Group, the Sandringham, Werribee and Williamstown lines which are part of the Cross City Group, the Craigieburn and Upfield lines which are part of the Northern Group, the Frankston line and the Flemington Racecourse line. In addition to these 16 electrified lines, there is also the Stony Point line which operates as a shuttle service between Frankston and Stony Point.

There are 227 suburban railway stations that are currently operational in Melbourne. In addition to the stations currently opened, there are an additional 73 closed to passengers and 4 stations expected to open in the near future.

The network is broken up into two Myki ticketing zones. These zones determine how much it would cost to travel from one station to another, with cross zone travel costing more than travelling within the same zone.

== List of current stations ==
denotes a tram connection

denotes a bus connection

denotes a SkyBus connection

denotes a regional coach connection

denotes a ferry connection

List of currently operational stations
Station	Code	Image	Transport connections	Served by	Distance from Southern Cross		Zone(s)	Date opened	Suburb	Notes
Station	Code	Image	Transport connections	Served by	km	mi	Zone(s)	Date opened	Suburb	Notes
Aircraft	ACF	Northbound view from platform 1 at Aircraft	Aircraft railway station#Transport links	Werribee	22.23	13.81	2	7 March 1925	Laverton	Upgraded in 2022
Alamein	ALM	Platform 1 at Alamein station		Alamein	16.12	10.02	1	28 June 1948	Ashburton	
Albion	ALB	North-west bound view from platform 1 at Albion	Albion railway station, Melbourne#Transport links	Sunbury	13.65	8.48	1/2	5 January 1860	Albion	Formerly Albion and Darlington
Alphington	ALP	Westbound view from Platform 1 at Alphington	Alphington railway station#Transport links	Hurstbridge	10.46	6.50	1	8 May 1888	Alphington	
Altona	ALT	Westbound view from the single platform at Altona	Altona railway station#Transport links	Werribee	17.15	10.66	1/2	22 August 1888	Altona	Formerly Altona Beach. Rebuilt in 1917
Anstey	ASY	Northbound view from Anstey platform 2	Anstey railway station#Transport links	Upfield	8.04	5.00	1	15 December 1926	Brunswick	
Anzac	AZC	Platform 1 at Anzac station	Anzac railway station#Transport links	Cranbourne; Pakenham			1	30 November 2025	South Yarra	
Arden	AEN	Arden station entrance		Sunbury			1	30 November 2025	North Melbourne	
Armadale	ARM	Westbound view from Armadale platform 2 facing platform 1	Armadale railway station, Melbourne#Transport links	Frankston	8.67	5.39	1	7 May 1879	Armadale	Rebuilt in 1914.
Ascot Vale	ASV	Southbound view from Ascot Vale platform 2 facing platform 1	Ascot Vale railway station#Transport links	Craigieburn	5.81	3.61	1	1 November 1860	Ascot Vale	
Ashburton	ASH	Soutbound view from the single platform at Ashburton	Ashburton railway station, Melbourne#Transport links	Alamein	15.39	9.56	1	30 May 1890	Ashburton	Formerly Norwood
Aspendale	ASP	Southbound view from Aspendale platform 2 facing towards platform 1	Aspendale railway station#Transport links	Frankston	30.31	18.83	1	April 1891	Aspendale	Formerly Aspendale Park Race-Course
Auburn	AUB	Citybound view from Auburn platform 2 facing towards platform 3	Auburn railway station, Melbourne#Transport links	Alamein; Belgrave; Lilydale	8.96	5.57	1	3 April 1882	Hawthorn East	Formerly Auburn Road
Balaclava	BCV	Southbound view from Balaclava platform 1 facing towards platform 2	Balaclava railway station, Melbourne#Transport links	Sandringham	9.08	5.64	1	19 December 1859	Balaclava	Upgraded in 2014
Batman	BAT	Northbound view from Batman platforms 1 and 2	Batman railway station, Melbourne#Transport links Batman railway station#Transport links	Upfield	11.23	6.98	1/2	8 October 1889	Coburg North	Formerly Bell Park
Baxter	BXR	Baxter station viewed from a patch of grass near the station	Baxter railway station#Transport links	Stony Point	51.97	32.29	2	1 October 1888	Baxter	Formerly Mornington Junction
Bayswater	BAY	Citybound view from Bayswater platforms 1 and 2	Bayswater railway station, Melbourne#Transport links	Belgrave	30.76	19.11	2	4 December 1889	Bayswater	Rebuilt in 2016
Beaconsfield	BFD	Beaconsfield station and the main building viewed from outside of the station	Beaconsfield railway station, Melbourne#Transport links	Pakenham	46.99	29.20	2	1 December 1879	Beaconsfield	
Belgrave	BEG	The two platforms at Belgrave station viewed from Belgrave-Gembrook Road with an X'Trapolis train at Platform 2	Belgrave railway station#Transport links	Belgrave	42.53	26.43	2	18 December 1900	Belgrave	Formerly Monbulk. Originally narrow gauge
Bell	BEL	Station building at Bell railway station	Bell railway station, Melbourne#Transport links	Mernda	11.70	7.27	1	8 October 1889	Preston	Formerly Preston – Bell Street. Rebuilt in 2022
Bentleigh	BEN	Southbound view from Bentleigh platform 3 facing towards platform 2	Bentleigh railway station#Transport links	Frankston	16.47	10.23	1/2	19 December 1881	Bentleigh	Formerly East Brighton. Rebuilt in 2016
Berwick	BEW	Berwick station viewed from the grass right outside of the station	Berwick railway station, Melbourne#Transport links	Pakenham; Traralgon	44.58	27.70	2	8 October 1877	Berwick	
Bittern	BIT	Tracks on the stony point line near Bittern station	Bittern railway station#Transport links	Stony Point	68.67	42.67	2	17 September 1889	Bittern	
Blackburn	BBN	View from blackburn platform 3 facing towards platforms 1 and 2	Blackburn railway station, Melbourne#Transport links	Belgrave; Lilydale	18.67	11.60	2	25 December 1882	Blackburn	
Bonbeach	BON	Northbound view form Bonbeach platform 1 facing towards platform 2		Frankston	34.61	21.51	2	15 February 1926	Bonbeach	Rebuilt in 2021
Boronia	BOR	Northbound view from Platform 2 at Boronia station	Boronia railway station#Transport links	Belgrave	33.38	20.74	2	16 June 1920	Boronia	Rebuilt in 1998
Box Hill	BOX	Outbound view from Box Hill platform 4 facing towards platforms 1–3	Box Hill railway station, Melbourne#Transport links	Belgrave; Lilydale	16.16	10.04	2	1 December 1882	Box Hill	
Brighton Beach	BBH	Northbound view from Brighton Beach platform 1 facing platform 2	Brighton Beach railway station#Transport links	Sandringham	15.97	9.92	1/2	21 December 1861	Brighton	Formerly Beach
Broadmeadows	BMS	Southbound view from Broadmeadows platform 1 facing platform 2	Broadmeadows railway station, Melbourne#Transport links	5 Services: Albury Craigieburn NSW TrainLink Southern Seymour Shepparton	16.85	10.47	2	1 February 1873	Broadmeadows	
Brunswick	BWK	Northbound view from Brunswick platform 2 facing platform 1	Brunswick railway station#Transport links	Upfield	7.31	4.54	1	9 September 1884	Brunswick	
Burnley	BLY	Citybound view from Burnley platforms 3 and 4 facing towards platforms 1 and 2	Burnley railway station#Transport links	Alamein; Belgrave; Glen Waverley; Lilydale	5.33	3.31	1	1 May 1880	Burnley	Formerly Burnley Street. Rebuilt in 1966.
Burwood	BWD	Southbound view from Burwood platform 1 facing towards platform 2	Burwood railway station, Melbourne#Transport links	Alamein	14.17	8.80	1	30 May 1890	Glen Iris	Formerly Hartwell
Camberwell	CAM	Two X'Trapolis trains pass by at Camberwell station	Camberwell railway station, Melbourne#Transport links	Alamein; Belgrave; Lilydale	10.21	6.34	1	3 April 1882	Camberwell	
Canterbury	CBY	Westbound view from Platform 2 at Canterbury station	Canterbury railway station, Melbourne#Transport links	Belgrave; Lilydale	12.19	7.57	1/2	1 December 1882	Canterbury	
Cardinia Road	CDA	Westbound view from Platform 1 at Cardinia Road Station	Cardinia Road railway station, Melbourne#Transport links	Pakenham	53.80	33.43	2	22 April 2012	Pakenham	
Carnegie	CNE	North-west bound view from Platform 1 at Carnegie Station	Carnegie railway station, Melbourne#Transport links	Cranbourne; Pakenham	13.54	8.41	1	14 May 1879	Carnegie	Formerly Rosstown. Rebuilt in 2018
Carrum	CAR	Northbound view from Carrum platform 2	Carrum railway station#Transport links	Frankston	36.10	22.43	2	1 August 1882	Carrum	Rebuilt in 2020
Caulfield	CFD	South-east bound view from Platform 4 facing towards Platform 3	Caulfield railway station#Transport links	Cranbourne; Frankston; Pakenham; Traralgon	11.79	7.33	1	7 May 1879	Caulfield East	
Chatham	CHM	Eastbound view from Platform 2 facing towards Platform3 and the station buildings		Belgrave; Lilydale	12.95	8.05	1/2	1 April 1927	Surrey Hills	
Chelsea	CSA	Southbound view from Platform 1 at Chelsea Station	Chelsea railway station, Melbourne#Transport links	Frankston	33.37	20.74	2	4 February 1907	Chelsea	Rebuilt in 2021
Cheltenham	CTM	Southbound view from Platform 3 at Cheltenham Railway Station showing Platforms 1 and 2 to the right	Cheltenham railway station, Melbourne#Transport links	Frankston	22.32	13.87	2	19 December 1881	Cheltenham	Rebuilt in 2020
Clayton	CLA	North-west bound view from Platform 1 at Clayton Railway Station	Clayton railway station, Melbourne#Transport links	Cranbourne; Pakenham; Traralgon	20.51	12.74	2	6 January 1880	Clayton	Formerly Clayton's Road. Rebuilt in 2018
Clifton Hill	CHL	Southbound view from Platform 1 at Clifton Hill station	Clifton Hill railway station#Transport links	Hurstbridge; Mernda	6.60	4.10	1	8 May 1888	Clifton Hill	Upgraded in 2009.
Coburg	COB	Northbound view from Coburg platform 2 facing towards platform 1	Coburg railway station#Transport links	Upfield	10.12	6.29	1	9 September 1884	Coburg	Rebuilt in 2020
Collingwood	CWD	Northbound view from Collingwood platform 2 facing towards platform 1	Collingwood railway station#Transport links	Hurstbridge; Mernda	4.83	3.00	1	21 October 1901	Abbotsford	
Coolaroo	CLO	View of Coolaroo platforms 1 and 2 from a bridge	Coolaroo railway station#Transport links	Craigieburn	19.31	12.00	2	6 June 2010	Coolaroo	
Craigieburn	CGB	Northbound view from Craigeburn platform 1 facing towards platform 2	Craigieburn railway station#Transport links	Craigieburn; Seymour	26.10	16.22	2	18 April 1872	Craigieburn	Rebuilt in 2007 (platform 1); Platform 2 rebuilt in 2009.
Cranbourne	CBE	Two HCMT trains on both platforms both headed for Sunbury via Metro Tunnel services	Cranbourne railway station#Transport links	Cranbourne	45.12	28.04	2	1 October 1888	Cranbourne	Rebuilt in 1995. Upgraded in 2008
Crib Point	CPT	Station shelter and entrance to Platform 1 at Crib Point station	Crib Point railway station#Transport links	Stony Point	72.83	45.25	2	17 December 1889	Crib Point	
Croxton	CXT	Southbound view from Platform 1 at Croxton station	Croxton railway station#Transport links	Mernda	9.61	5.97	1	8 October 1889	Northcote	
Croydon	CDN	South-west bound view from Platform 2 at Croydon station	Croydon railway station, Melbourne#Transport links	Lilydale	31.03	19.28	2	1 December 1882	Croydon	Formerly Warrandyte
Dandenong	DNG	Citybound view from Dandenong platform 3 facing towards platforms 1&2	Dandenong railway station#Transport links	Cranbourne; Pakenham; Traralgon	31.19	19.38	2	8 October 1877	Dandenong	Upgraded in 1995
Darebin	DBN		Darebin railway station#Transport links	Hurstbridge	11.22	6.97	1	8 May 1922	Ivanhoe	
Darling	DLG	Citybound view from Darling platform 2 facing towards platform 1	Darling railway station#Transport links	Glen Waverley	12.68	7.88	1/2	24 March 1890	Malvern East	
Dennis	DEN	Eastbound view from Dennis platform 2 facing towards platform 1	Dennis railway station#Transport links	Hurstbridge	8.40	5.22	1	4 February 1924	Northcote	
Diamond Creek	DCK	Northbound view from Diamond Creek platform 1 looking towards platform 2	Diamond Creek railway station#Transport links	Hurstbridge	32.63	20.28	2	25 June 1912	Diamond Creek	Upgraded in 2023.
Diggers Rest	DIT	Northbound view from Platform 1 at Diggers Rest Station	Diggers Rest railway station#Transport links	Sunbury	32.69	20.31	2	2 October 1859	Diggers Rest	Upgraded in 2012.
Eaglemont	EGT	Northbound view from Eaglemont platform 2 facing towards platform 1		Hurstbridge	13.09	8.13	1/2	1 May 1926	Eaglemont	
East Camberwell	ECM	Westbound view from East Camberwell platform 3 facing towards platforms 1 and 2		Belgrave; Lilydale	11.08	6.88	1	14 May 1900	Camberwell	
East Malvern	EMV		East Malvern railway station#Transport links	Glen Waverley	13.75	8.54	1/2	3 February 1929	Malvern East	Formerly Eastmalvern
East Pakenham	EPH			Pakenham	56.85	35.32	2	3 June 2024	Pakenham East	
East Richmond	ERM	Eastbound view from East Richmond platform 1 facing towards platform 2	East Richmond railway station, Melbourne#Transport links	Alamein; Belgrave; Glen Waverley; Lilydale	4.37	2.72	1	24 September 1860	Cremorne	Formerly Church Street; Rebuilt in 1966.
Edithvale	EDI	Southbound view from Platform 1 at Edithvale Station	Edithvale railway station#Transport links	Frankston	31.67	19.68	2	20 September 1919	Edithvale	Rebuilt in 2021
Elsternwick	ELS	Northbound view from Esternwick platforms 1&2	Elsternwick railway station, Melbourne#Transport links Elsternwick railway station#Transport links	Sandringham	10.95	6.80	1	19 December 1859	Elsternwick	Rebuilt in 1960.
Eltham	ELT	Northbound view from Platform 2 at Eltham station, the station building can be seen to the right and a stabled X'Trapolis to the left	Eltham railway station, Melbourne#Transport links	Hurstbridge	27.39	17.02	2	5 June 1902	Eltham	Upgraded in 2013.
Epping	EPP	Main entrance at Epping station	Epping railway station, Melbourne#Transport links	Mernda	22.82	14.18	2	23 December 1889	Epping	Rebuilt in 1964, 1989 and 2011.
Essendon	ESD	Southbound view from Essendon platforms 2&3 facing towards platform 1	Essendon railway station, Melbourne#Transport links	Craigieburn; Seymour	8.01	4.98	1	1 November 1860	Essendon	
Fairfield	FFD	Westbound view from Fairfield platform 2 facing towards platform 1	Fairfield railway station, Melbourne#Transport links	Hurstbridge	9.15	5.69	1	8 May 1888	Fairfield	Formerly Fairfield Park
Fawkner	FAK	Northbound view from Platform 2, showing the overall features of the station	Fawkner railway station#Transport links	Upfield	13.23	8.22	1/2	8 October 1889	Hadfield	Formerly: Fawkner Cemetery; Fawkner Upgraded in 1998.
Ferntree Gully	FTG	Platforms 1 and 2 at Ferntree Gully	Ferntree Gully railway station#Transport links	Belgrave	35.89	22.30	2	4 December 1889	Ferntree Gully	Formerly Lower Ferntree Gully. Also spelt Lower Fern Tree Gully / Fern Tree Gully
Flagstaff	FGS	Platform 2 at Flagstaff facing towards Southern Cross	Flagstaff railway station#Transport links	9 Services: Alamein Belgrave Craigieburn Frankston Glen Waverley Hurstbridge Lilydale Mernda Upfield	1.24	0.77	1	27 May 1985	Melbourne	
Flemington Bridge	FBD	Northbound view from Flemington Bridge platform 1 facing platform 2	Flemington Bridge railway station, Melbourne#Transport links	Upfield	4.06	2.52	1	10 April 1885	North Melbourne	Formerly Flemington
Flemington Racecourse	RCE	Comeng arriving at Flemington racecourse	Flemington Racecourse railway station, Melbourne#Transport links	Flemington Racecourse	6.59	4.09	1	28 February 1861	Flemington	Used for special event services only
Flinders Street	FSS	Main station building at Flinders Street, this building is listed as one of the cities main landmarks	Town Hall railway station, Melbourne Flinders Street railway station, Melbourne#Transport links	14 Services: Alamein Belgrave Craigieburn Flemington Racecourse Frankston Glen Waverley Hurstbridge Lilydale Mernda Sandringham Traralgon Upfield Werribee Williamstown	1.23	0.76	1	12 September 1854	Melbourne	Formerly Melbourne Terminus. Rebuilt in 1910
Footscray	FSY	Southbound view from Platform 6 at Footscray	Footscray railway station#Transport links	10 Services: Ararat Ballarat Bendigo Echuca Geelong Sunbury Swan Hill Warrnambool Werribee Williamstown	5.62	3.49	1	24 January 1859	Footscray	Formerly: Footscray (Suburban) / Middle Footscray; Footscray (Main Line).; Rebuilt 24 September 1900. Upgraded in 2014
Frankston	FKN	Northbound view from Platform 3 showing overall features of Frankston station	Frankston railway station#Transport links Frankston railway station, Melbourne#Transport links	Frankston; Stony Point	43.92	27.29	2	1 August 1882	Frankston	Upgraded in 2018
Gardenvale	GVE	Southbound view from Gardenvale platform 2 facing towards platform 1	Gardenvale railway station#Transport links	Sandringham	12.35	7.67	1	10 December 1906	Brighton	
Gardiner	GAR	Eastbound view from Gardiner platform 2 facing towards platform 1	Gardiner railway station#Transport links	Glen Waverley	10.61	6.59	1	24 March 1890	Glen Iris	Rebuilt in 2016
Ginifer	GIN	Southbound view from 2 at Ginifer railway station, showing overall features of this station	Ginifer railway station#Transport links	Sunbury	15.97	9.92	2	31 October 1982	St Albans	Rebuilt in 2016
Glen Huntly	GHY	Station entrance and building from Glen Huntly Road and Glen Huntly Station Tram Stop	Glen Huntly railway station#Transport links	Frankston	13.46	8.36	1	19 December 1881	Glen Huntly	Formerly: Glen Huntly; Glen Huntly Road; Glenhuntly
Glen Iris	GIR	Glen iris station viewed from the west end of the station	Glen Iris railway station#Transport links	Glen Waverley	11.52	7.16	1	24 March 1890	Glen Iris	
Glen Waverley	GWY		Glen Waverley railway station#Transport links	Glen Waverley	22.23	13.81	2	5 May 1930	Glen Waverley	Rebuilt in 1964.
Glenbervie	GBV	Northbound view from Platform 1 at Glenbervie railway station, showing both station buildings on both platforms	Glenbervie railway station#Transport links	Craigieburn	9.13	5.67	1	11 September 1922	Essendon	
Glenferrie	GFE	Westbound view from Platform 2 at Glenferrie railway station, showing the main station building	Glenferrie railway station#Transport links	Alamein; Belgrave; Lilydale	8.12	5.05	1	3 April 1882	Hawthorn	Formerly Glenferrie Road
Glenroy	GRY	Northbound view from Platform 1 at Glenroy railway station, showing the main station concourse upper level on the north end of the station	Glenroy railway station#Transport links	Craigieburn	14.40	8.95	1/2	24 January 1887	Glenroy	Rebuilt in 2022
Gowrie	GOW	Southbound view of Platform 1 and station building and entrance at Gowrie railway station, viewed from the northern side pedestrian railway crossing	Gowrie railway station#Transport links	Upfield	14.73	9.15	2	16 October 1928	Fawkner	Closed in 1956. Rebuilt in 1959.
Greensborough	GRN	North-east bound view from Platforms 1&2, showing the concourse in the distance	Greensborough railway station#Transport links	Hurstbridge	23.07	14.34	2	5 June 1902	Greensborough	Rebuilt in 1979 and 2023
Hallam	HLM	Citybound view from Hallam platform 2 facing platform 1	Hallam railway station#Transport links	Pakenham	37.45	23.27	2	1 December 1880	Hallam	Formerly Hallam's Road. Rebuilt in 2022
Hampton	HAM	Southbound view from Hampton platform 2 facing platform 1	Hampton railway station, Melbourne#Transport links	Sandringham	17.70	11.00	2	2 September 1887	Hampton	Formerly: Retreat; Hampton
Hartwell	HWL	Main entrance to Hartwell station		Alamein	13.30	8.26	1	7 May 1906	Camberwell	Formerly Hartwell Hill
Hastings	HST	Main entrance to Hastings station	Hastings railway station, Melbourne#Transport links	Stony Point	64.99	40.38	2	10 September 1889	Hastings	
Hawksburn	HKN	South-east view of the station, Platform 1, footbridge and Edwardian building	Hawksburn railway station, Melbourne#Transport links	Frankston	6.63	4.12	1	7 May 1889	South Yarra	Rebuilt in 1914.
Hawkstowe	HWS	Citybound view from Hawkstowe platforms 1&2	Hawkstowe railway station#Transport links	Mernda	30.73	19.09	2	26 August 2018	South Morang	
Hawthorn	HAW	Westbound view from Burke Road ramp entrance, looking at all three platforms	Hawthorn railway station, Melbourne#Transport links	Alamein; Belgrave; Lilydale	6.89	4.28	1	13 April 1861	Hawthorn	
Heatherdale	HTD	Westbound view from Platform 2 at Heatherdale railway station, showing upper level concourse at the western end of the station	Heatherdale railway station#Transport links	Belgrave; Lilydale	24.42	15.17	2	7 September 1958	Ringwood	Rebuilt in 2017
Heathmont	HMT	Southbound view from Heathmont platform 2 facing towards platform 1	Heathmont railway station#Transport links	Belgrave	28.12	17.47	2	1 May 1926	Heathmont	
Heidelberg	HDB	Heidelberg station platforms 1&2	Heidelberg railway station#Transport links	Hurstbridge	14.04	8.72	1/2	8 May 1888	Heidelberg	
Heyington	HEY	Eastbound view from Heyington platform 2 facing platform 1		Glen Waverley	7.12	4.42	1	24 March 1890	Toorak	
Highett	HIG	Southbound view from Platform 1 at Highett station	Highett railway station#Transport links	Frankston	20.06	12.46	2	19 December 1881	Highett	Formerly Highett Road
Holmesglen	HOL	Holmesglen platforms 1&2 viewed from the south end of the station	Holmesglen railway station#Transport links	Glen Waverley	15.64	9.72	1/2	5 May 1930	East Malvern	
Hoppers Crossing	HCG	View from Platform 2 at Hoppers Crossing	Hoppers Crossing railway station#Transport links	Werribee	27.67	17.19	2	16 November 1970	Hoppers Crossing	
Hughesdale	HUG	North-west bound view from Hughsdale platform 2	Hughesdale railway station#Transport links	Cranbourne; Pakenham	15.27	9.49	1/2	28 February 1925	Hughesdale	Rebuilt in 2018
Huntingdale	HUN	Platforms 1&2 at Huntingdale	Huntingdale railway station#Transport links	Cranbourne; Pakenham	18.28	11.36	1/2	25 June 1927	Oakleigh	Formerly Eastoakleigh
Hurstbridge	HBE	Northbound view at Hurstbridge platform 1	Hurstbridge railway station#Transport links	Hurstbridge	38.02	23.62	2	25 June 1912	Hurstbridge	
Ivanhoe	IVA	Westbound view from Ivanhoe Platform 1	Ivanhoe railway station, Melbourne#Transport links	Hurstbridge	12.14	7.54	1/2	8 May 1888	Ivanhoe	
Jacana	JAC	Northbound view from Platform 1 at Jacana railway station, showing station building and pedestrian overpass at the northern end of the station		Craigieburn	15.43	9.59	2	15 February 1959	Glenroy	
Jewell	JWL	Northbound view from Jewell platform 2 facing towards platform 1	Jewell railway station#Transport links	Upfield	6.50	4.04	1	9 September 1884	Brunswick	Formerly South Brunswick
Jolimont	JLI	Eastbound view of both platforms at Jolimont railway station, taken from a nearby footbridge	Jolimont railway station#Transport links	Hurstbridge; Mernda	2.91	1.81	1	21 October 1901	East Melbourne	
Jordanville	JOR	Westbound view of Jordanville platforms 1&2	Jordanville railway station#Transport links	Glen Waverley	17.64	10.96	2	5 May 1930	Mount Waverley	
Kananook	KAN	Southbound view from a footbridge near Kankook platforms 1&2	Kananook railway station#Transport links	Frankston	41.44	25.75	2	25 August 1975	Seaford	
Keilor Plains	KPL	Citybound view from Kelior Plains platform 1 facing towards platform 2	Keilor Plains railway station#Transport links	Sunbury	19.62	12.19	2	27 January 2002	St Albans	
Kensington	KEN	Southbound view from Kensington platform 2 facing towards platform 1	Kensington railway station, Melbourne#Transport links	Craigieburn	3.58	2.22	1	1 November 1860	Kensington	
Keon Park	KPK	Southbound view from Platform 1 at Keon Park	Keon Park railway station#Transport links	Mernda	17.54	10.90	2	16 December 1929	Thomastown	
Kooyong	KYG	Westbound view from Kooyong platform 1 facing towards platform 2	Kooyong railway station#Transport links	Glen Waverley	8.28	5.14	1	24 March 1890	Kooyong	
Laburnum	LAB	Comeng (in connex livery) departing Laburnm platform 2	Laburnum railway station#Transport links	Belgrave; Lilydale	17.82	11.07	2	13 July 1958	Blackburn	
Lalor	LAL	Southbound view from Platform 2 at Lalor	Lalor railway station#Transport links	Mernda	20.81	12.93	2	1 October 1949	Lalor	
Laverton	LAV	Southbound view from Laverton platform 1 facing towards platform 2 and 3	Laverton railway station, Melbourne#Transport links	Werribee	21.01	13.06	1/2	1 July 1886	Laverton	
Leawarra	LWA	Platform 1 at Leawarra viewed from outside the station	Leawarra railway station#Transport links	Stony Point	45.77	28.44	2	30 November 1959	Frankston	Formerly Railmotor Stopping Place No. 16
Lilydale	LIL	Xtrapolis at Lilydale station	Lilydale railway station#Transport links	Lilydale	38.86	24.15	2	1 December 1882	Lilydale	Rebuilt in 2021
Lynbrook	LBK	Southbound view from Lynbrook platform 2 facing towards platform 1	Lynbrook railway station#Transport links	Cranbourne	39.59	24.60	2	22 April 2012	Lynbrook	
Macaulay	MAC	Southbound view from Macualy platform 1 facing towards platform 2	Macaulay railway station#Transport links	Upfield	3.25	2.02	1	1 December 1887	North Melbourne	
Macleod	MCD	Macleod platforms 1&2 viewed from the northend of the station	Macleod railway station#Transport links	Hurstbridge	17.71	11.00	2	1 March 1911	Macleod	
Malvern	MAL	Northbound view from Malvern platform 4 facing towards platforms 1–3	Malvern railway station, Melbourne#Transport links	Cranbourne; Frankston; Pakenham	10.11	6.28	1	7 May 1879	Malvern	Rebuilt in 1914.
McKinnon	MCK		McKinnon railway station#Transport links	Frankston	15.84	9.84	1/2	1 September 1884	McKinnon	Formerly McKinnon Road. Rebuilt in 2016
Melbourne Central	MCE	Eastbound view from Melbourne Central platform 3	State Library railway station Melbourne Central railway station#Transport links	9 Services: Alamein Belgrave Craigieburn Frankston Glen Waverley Hurstbridge Lilydale Mernda Upfield	1.85	1.15	1	26 January 1981	Melbourne	Formerly Museum. Upgraded in 2004-2005.
Mentone	MEN	Northbound view from Platform 2 at Mentone railway station	Mentone railway station#Transport links	Frankston	24.48	15.21	2	19 December 1881	Mentone	Formerly: Balcombe; Balcombe Road; Rebuilt in 2020
Merinda Park	MPK	Platform 1 entrance at Merinda Park station	Merinda Park railway station#Transport links	Cranbourne	42.35	26.32	2	24 March 1995	Cranbourne North	Rebuilt in 2022
Merlynston	MYN	Northbound view from Platform 2, showing station building on the island platform at Merlynston railway station	Merlynston railway station#Transport links	Upfield	12.49	7.76	1/2	8 October 1889	Coburg North	Formerly North Coburg
Mernda	MDD	Mernda station viewed from the ground level	Mernda railway station#Transport links	Mernda	33.07	20.55	2	23 December 1889	Mernda	Rebuilt 26 August 2018
Merri	MER	Northbound view from Platform 1 at Merri	Merri railway station#Transport links	Mernda	8.04	5.00	1	8 October 1889	Northcote	Formerly Northcote
Middle Brighton	MBN	Southbound view from Platform 2 at Middle Brighton railway station	Middle Brighton railway station#Transport links	Sandringham	14.52	9.02	1/2	21 December 1861	Brighton	Formerly Church Street
Middle Footscray	MFY	Eastbound view from Platform 2 at Middle Footscray railway station	Middle Footscray railway station#Transport links	Sunbury	6.61	4.11	1	10 December 1906	Footscray	
Middle Gorge	MMR	Northbound view from Middle Gorge platform 2 facing towards platform 1	Middle Gorge railway station#Transport links	Mernda	28.34	17.61	2	26 August 2018	South Morang	
Mitcham	MCH	Westbound view from Mitcham platform 1 facing towards platform 2	Mitcham railway station, Melbourne#Transport links	Belgrave; Lilydale	22.47	13.96	2	25 December 1882	Mitcham	Rebuilt in 2014
Montmorency	MMY	Montmorency station viewed from the main Carpark		Hurstbridge	24.69	15.34	2	5 September 1923	Montmorency	
Moonee Ponds	MPD	Northbound view from Moonee ponds platform 2 facing towards platform 1	Moonee Ponds railway station#Transport links	Craigieburn	6.89	4.28	1	1 November 1860	Moonee Ponds	
Moorabbin	MRN	Moorabin platforms 1–3 viewed from a nearby bridge	Moorabbin railway station#Transport links	Frankston	18.45	11.46	2	19 December 1881	Moorabbin	Formerly South Brighton
Mooroolbark	MLK	South-Westbound view from Mooroolbark platform 1	Mooroolbark railway station#Transport links	Lilydale	34.48	21.42	2	10 October 1887	Mooroolbark	Rebuilt in 2021
Mordialloc	MOR	Northbound view from Mordialloc platform 2 facing towards platform 1	Mordialloc railway station#Transport links	Frankston	27.69	17.21	2	19 December 1881	Mordialloc	
Moreland	MLD	Southbound view from Moreland platform 1 facing towards platform 2	Moreland railway station#Transport links	Upfield	8.78	5.46	1	9 September 1884	Coburg	
Morradoo	MRO	Morradoo platform 1 viewed from outside the station	Morradoo railway station#Transport links	Stony Point	70.96	44.09	2	7 November 1960	Crib Point	Formerly Railmotor Stopping Place No. 15
Mount Waverley	MWY	Westbound view from Mount Waverley platform 2 facing towards platform 1	Mount Waverley railway station#Transport links	Glen Waverley	19.00	11.81	2	5 May 1930	Mount Waverley	
Murrumbeena	MRB	Westbound view from Murrumbeena platform 1&2	Murrumbeena railway station#Transport links	Cranbourne; Pakenham	14.43	8.97	1	14 May 1879	Murrumbeena	Rebuilt in 2018
Narre Warren	NWA	New side platforms at Narre Warren on opening day	Narre Warren railway station#Transport links	Pakenham	40.80	25.35	2	10 March 1882	Narre Warren	Rebuilt in 2024
Newmarket	NKT	Northbound view from Newmarket platform 2 facing towards platform 1	Newmarket railway station, Melbourne#Transport links	Craigieburn	4.30	2.67	1	1 November 1860	Flemington	
Newport	NPT	Northbound view from Newport platform 2 facing towards platform 1	Newport railway station, Melbourne#Transport links	Werribee; Williamstown	10.56	6.56	1	1 March 1859	Newport	Formerly: Williamstown Junction; Geelong Junction
Noble Park	NPK	South-east bound view from Platform 1 at Noble Park railway station	Noble Park railway station#Transport links	Cranbourne; Pakenham	27.23	16.92	2	3 February 1913	Noble Park	Rebuilt in 2018
North Brighton	NBN	Southbound view from North Brighton Victoria platform 1 facing towards platform 2	North Brighton railway station#Transport links	Sandringham	13.24	8.23	1/2	19 December 1859	Brighton	Formerly Bay Street
North Melbourne	NME	Main station entrance at North Melbourne	North Melbourne railway station#Transport links	6 Services: Craigieburn Flemington Racecourse Seymour Upfield Werribee Williamstown	1.72	1.07	1	6 October 1859	West Melbourne	Upgraded in 2009
North Richmond	NRM	Southbound view from North Richmond platform 2 facing towards platform 1	North Richmond railway station#Transport links	Hurstbridge; Mernda	4.16	2.58	1	21 October 1901	Richmond	
North Williamstown	NWN	Northbound view from North Williamstown platform 1 facing towards platform 2	North Williamstown railway station#Transport links	Williamstown	12.27	7.62	1	1 February 1859	Williamstown	Rebuilt in 2021
Northcote	NCE	Northbound view from Northcote platform 2 facing towards platform 1	Northcote railway station#Transport links	Mernda	8.97	5.57	1	8 October 1889	Northcote	Formerly Middle Northcote
Nunawading	NWG	Belgrave bound xtrapolis at Nunawading platform 2	Nunawading railway station#Transport links	Belgrave; Lilydale	20.77	12.91	2	4 June 1888	Nunawading	Formerly Tunstall. Rebuilt in 2010
Oak Park	OPK	Southbound view from Oak Park platform 2 facing towards platform 1		Craigieburn	12.88	8.00	1/2	13 August 1956	Oak Park	
Oakleigh	OAK	Southbound view from Oakleigh platform 1 facing towards platform 2	Oakleigh railway station#Transport links	Cranbourne; Pakenham	16.59	10.31	1/2	8 October 1877	Oakleigh	Upgraded in 2018–2019
Officer	OFC	Officer platforms 1&2 viewed from West end of the station		Pakenham	51.45	31.97	2	4 August 1881	Officer	Formerly Officer's Siding
Ormond	OMD	Northbound view from Ormond platforms 1&2 facing towards platform 3	Ormond railway station#Transport links	Frankston	15.02	9.33	1/2	19 December 1881	Ormond	Formerly North Road. Rebuilt in 2016
Pakenham	PKM	Pakenham station south side of new elevated bridge	Pakenham railway station#Transport links	Pakenham; Traralgon	58.19	36.16	2	8 October 1877	Pakenham	Rebuilt 2024.
Parkdale	PKD	Southbound view from Parkdale platform 2 facing towards platform 1	Parkdale railway station#Transport links	Frankston	25.93	16.11	2	1 September 1919	Parkdale	Rebuilt 2024
Parkville	PKV	Parkville station concourse	Parkville railway station#Transport links	Sunbury			1	30 November 2025	Parkville	
Parliament	PAR	Northbound view from Platform 2 at Parliament	Parliament railway station#Transport links	9 Services: Alamein Belgrave Craigieburn Frankston Glen Waverley Hurstbridge Lilydale Mernda Upfield	3.08	1.91	1	22 January 1983	East Melbourne	
Pascoe Vale	PVL	Northbound view from Pascoe Vale platform 1 facing towards platform 2	Pascoe Vale railway station#Transport links	Craigieburn	11.27	7.00	1/2	10 November 1885	Pascoe Vale	
Patterson	PAT	Patterson platform 3		Frankston	17.39	10.81	2	28 May 1961	Bentleigh	
Prahran	PRA		Prahran railway station#Transport links	Sandringham	6.72	4.18	1	22 December 1860	Prahran	Formerly Greville Street
Preston	PRE	Main entrance to Preston station	Preston railway station, Melbourne#Transport links	Mernda	12.47	7.75	1/2	8 October 1889	Preston	Formerly Preston – Murray Road. Rebuilt in 2022
Regent	REG	Southbound view from Regent platform 2 facing towards platform 1	Regent railway station#Transport links	Mernda	13.61	8.46	1/2	8 October 1889	Reservoir	Formerly Preston – Regent Street
Reservoir	RES	Southbound view from Platform 2 at Reservoir	Reservoir railway station#Transport links	Mernda	14.94	9.28	1/2	8 October 1889	Reservoir	Formerly Preston – Reservoir. Rebuilt in 2019
Richmond	RMD	Citybound view from platform 6 at Richmond	Richmond railway station, Melbourne#Transport links	9 Services: Alamein Belgrave Frankston Glen Waverley Lilydale Sandringham Traralgon	3.80	2.36	1	8 February 1859	Richmond	Formerly: Swan Street; Punt Road Rebuilt in 1960.
Ringwood	RWD	Citybound view from Platform 2 facing Platform 1 at Ringwood	Ringwood railway station, Melbourne#Transport links	Belgrave; Lilydale	25.76	16.01	2	1 December 1882	Ringwood	Upgraded in 2016
Ringwood East	RWE	Main station entrance at Ringwood East	Ringwood East railway station#Transport links	Lilydale	27.76	17.25	2	18 May 1925	Ringwood East	Rebuilt in 2024.
Ripponlea	RIP	Birds eye view of the tracks at Ripponlea	Ripponlea railway station#Transport links	Sandringham	9.83	6.11	1	1 May 1912	Ripponlea	
Riversdale	RIV	Citybound view from Platform 1 at Riversdale facing platform 2	Riversdale railway station#Transport links	Alamein	11.73	7.29	1	30 May 1890	Camberwell	
Rosanna	ROS	Northbound view from Platform 2 at Rosanna facing platform 1	Rosanna railway station#Transport links	Hurstbridge	15.78	9.81	2	1 October 1927	Rosanna	Rebuilt in 2018
Roxburgh Park	RXP	Southbound view from Roxburgh Park from platform 1	Roxburgh Park railway station#Transport links	Craigieburn	22.08	13.72	2	18 April 1872	Roxburgh Park	Formerly Somerton
Royal Park	RPK	Southbound view from Royal Park platform 2 facing towards platform 1	Royal Park railway station#Transport links	Upfield	5.46	3.39	1	9 September 1884	Parkville	
Rushall	RUS	Northbound view from Rushall platform 1 facing towards platform 2	Rushall railway station#Transport links	Mernda	7.32	4.55	1	1 January 1927	Fitzroy North	
Ruthven	RUT	Southbound view from Ruthven station platform 2	Ruthven railway station#Transport links	Mernda	15.95	9.91	2	5 August 1963	Reservoir	Upgraded in 2024.
Sandown Park	SNP	Northbound view from Sandown park platforms 1&2		Cranbourne; Pakenham	25.68	15.96	2	12 August 1889	Springvale	Formerly Oakleigh Park Racecourse
Sandringham	SHM	Main station building at Sandringham	Sandringham railway station#Transport links	Sandringham	19.16	11.91	2	2 September 1887	Sandringham	
Seaford	SEA		Seaford railway station, Melbourne#Transport links	Frankston	39.35	24.45	2	1 December 1913	Seaford	
Seaholme	SHE	Sealhome station viewed from the Northend of the premises	Seaholme railway station, Melbourne#Transport links	Werribee	16.13	10.02	1	26 January 1920	Seaholme	
Seddon	SEN	North east view of seddon station		Werribee; Williamstown	6.62	4.11	1	10 December 1906	Seddon	
Showgrounds	SGS	Comeng at Showgrounds station	Showgrounds railway station, Melbourne#Transport links	Flemington Racecourse	5.73	3.56	1	7 November 1883	Flemington	Used for special event services only
Somerville	SVE	Somerville station viewed from the Northend of the station	Somerville railway station, Melbourne#Transport links	Stony Point	55.82	34.68	2	10 September 1889	Somerville	
South Kensington	SKN	Citybound view from South Kensington platform 2 facing towards platform 1		Werribee; Williamstown	3.49	2.17	1	11 March 1891	Kensington	
South Morang	SMG	Main entrance at South Morang station	South Morang railway station, Melbourne#Transport links	Mernda	25.97	16.14	2	22 April 2012	South Morang	
South Yarra	SYR	Southbound view from South Yarra platform 5, facing towards platforms 4, 3 and 2	South Yarra railway station#Transport links	Frankston; Sandringham	5.41	3.36	1	22 December 1860	South Yarra	Formerly Gardiner's Creek Road
Southern Cross	SSS	Northbound view from the Southern footbridge at Southern Cross	Southern Cross railway station#Transport links	26 Services: Alamein Albury Ararat Ballarat Belgrave Bendigo Craigieburn Echuca Flemington Racecourse Frankston Geelong Glen Waverley Hurstbridge Lilydale Maryborough Mernda NSW TrainLink Southern Seymour Shepparton Swan Hill Traralgon The Overland Upfield Warrnambool Werribee Williamstown	0		1	17 January 1859	Docklands	Formerly: Spencer Street; Batman's Hill Rebuilt 2002-2006
Southland	SOU	Southbound view from platform 1 at Southland facing towards platform 2		Frankston	21.44	13.32	2	26 November 2017	Cheltenham	
Spotswood	SPT	Southbound view from Spotswood platform 1 facing towards platform 2		Werribee; Williamstown	9.22	5.73	1	1 February 1878	Spotswood	Formerly: Spottiswoode; Bayswater; Edom
Springvale	SPG	View from Springvale platform 2 facing towards platform 1	Springvale railway station#Transport links	Cranbourne; Pakenham	24.50	15.22	2	1 September 1880	Springvale	Formerly Spring Vale. Rebuilt in 2014
State Library	STL	Platform 1 at State Library	Melbourne Central railway station State Library railway station, Melbourne#Transport links	Sunbury			1	30 November 2025	Melbourne	
St Albans	SAB	Northbound view from St Albans platform 2 facing towards platform 1	St Albans railway station, Melbourne#Transport links	Sunbury	17.81	11.07	2	1 February 1887	St Albans	Rebuilt 22 November 1959. Rebuilt in 2016
Stony Point	STY	Sprinter at Stony Point station waiting to depart	Stony Point railway station#Transport links	Stony Point	74.59	46.35	2	17 December 1889	Crib Point	
Strathmore	SME	Northbound view from Strathmore station platform 2 facing towards platform 1	Strathmore railway station#Transport links	Craigieburn	9.79	6.08	1	28 October 1890	Essendon	Formerly North Essendon
Sunbury	SUY	Northbound view from Sunbury platform 1 facing towards the train siding	Sunbury railway station, Melbourne#Transport links	Bendigo; Echuca; Sunbury	38.28	23.79	2	10 February 1859	Sunbury	Upgraded in 2012.
Sunshine	SUN	Northbound view from Sunshine platform 2 facing towards platform 1	Sunshine railway station, Melbourne#Transport links	Ballarat; Geelong; Sunbury	12.25	7.61	1/2	7 September 1885	Sunshine	Formerly Braybrook Junction. Upgraded in 2014
Syndal	SYN		Syndal railway station#Transport links	Glen Waverley	20.89	12.98	2	5 May 1930	Glen Waverley	
Tecoma	TCM	Birds eye view of Tecoma station	Tecoma railway station#Transport links	Belgrave	41.34	25.69	2	1 February 1924	Tecoma	Originally narrow gauge
Thomastown	TSN	Southbound view from Thomastown platform 2 facing towards platform 1	Thomastown railway station, Melbourne#Transport links	Mernda	19.14	11.89	2	23 December 1889	Thomastown	Upgraded in 2011
Thornbury	TBY	Southbound view from Platform 1 at Thornbury	Thornbury railway station, Melbourne#Transport links	Mernda	10.62	6.60	1	8 October 1889	Thornbury	
Toorak	TOR	Southbound view at Toorak platform 1 facing towards platforms 2–4	Toorak railway station#Transport links	Frankston	7.91	4.92	1	7 May 1879	Armadale	Rebuilt in 1914.
Town Hall	THL	Concourse at Town Hall station	Flinders Street railway station Town Hall railway station, Melbourne#Transport links	Cranbourne; Pakenham; Sunbury			1	30 November 2025	Melbourne	
Tooronga	TOR	Northbound view from Tooronga platform 1 facing towards platform 2	Tooronga railway station, Melbourne#Transport links	Glen Waverley	9.59	5.96	1	24 March 1890	Malvern	
Tottenham	TOT	Citybound Siemens Nexus train arriving at Tottenham station		Sunbury	9.10	5.65	1	2 March 1891	West Footscray	Rebuilt in 1981-1982.
Tyabb	TAB	Sprinter near Tyabb station	Tyabb railway station#Transport links	Stony Point	59.84	37.18	2	10 September 1889	Tyabb	
Union	UNN	Eastbound view from Platform 2 at Union	Union_railway_station,_Melbourne#Transport links	Belgrave; Lilydale	14.14	8.79	1/2	22 May 2023	Mont Albert	Merge between: Surrey Hills; Mont Albert
Upfield	UFD	Northbound view of Upfield station facing towards the carpark	Upfield railway station#Transport links	Upfield	18.86	11.72	2	8 October 1889	Campbellfield[262]	Formerly North Campbellfield
Upper Ferntree Gully	UFG	Eastbound view of Upper ferntree gully station facing mostly straight	Upper Ferntree Gully railway station#Transport links	Belgrave	37.66	23.40	2	4 December 1889	Upper Ferntree Gully	Also spelt Upper Fern Tree Gully
Upwey	UPW	Platforms 1 and 2 at Upwey being viewed from the North end of the station	Upwey railway station, Melbourne#Transport links	Belgrave	40.18	24.97	2	3 June 1901	Upwey	Originally narrow gauge
Victoria Park	VPK	southbound view from Victoria park platform 2	Victoria Park railway station, Melbourne#Transport links	Hurstbridge; Mernda	5.42	3.37	1	8 May 1888	Abbotsford	Formerly Collingwood. Rebuilt in 1901.
Watergardens	WGS	Northbound view from watergardens platforms 2 and 3	Watergardens railway station#Transport links	Bendigo; Echuca; Sunbury; Swan Hill	23.28	14.47	2	1 March 1859	Sydenham	Formerly: Sydenham; Keilor Road; Upgraded in 2002
Watsonia	WAT	birds eye view of wastonia station	Watsonia railway station#Transport links Watsonia railway station, Melbourne#Transport links	Hurstbridge	19.92	12.38	2	23 June 1924	Greensborough	Rebuilt in 1976-1979
Wattle Glen	WTT	Northbound view at Wattle Glen station	Wattle Glen railway station#Transport links	Hurstbridge	35.06	21.79	2	25 June 1912	Wattle Glen	Formerly Balee. Also spelt Wattleglen
Werribee	WER	North-east bound view from Werribee platform 2 facing towards platform 1	Werribee railway station#Transport links	Werribee	31.70	19.70	2	25 June 1857	Werribee	Rebuilt in 1983.
West Footscray	WFY	Northern view from west footscray platform 1 facing towards platforms 2 and 3	West Footscray railway station#Transport links	Sunbury	7.33	4.55	1	1 October 1888	West Footscray	Formerly Footscray West. Rebuilt 2013. Upgraded in 2020
West Richmond	WRM	Southbound view of West Richmond platform 2 facing towards platform 1	West Richmond railway station#Transport links	Hurstbridge; Mernda	3.66	2.27	1	21 October 1901	Richmond	
Westall	WTL	Southbound view from Westall platform 2 facing towards platform 1	Westall railway station#Transport links	Cranbourne; Pakenham	22.64	14.07	2	6 February 1951	Clayton South	Upgraded in 2010.
Westgarth	WTG	Northbound view from Westgarth platform 2 facing towards platform 1	Westgarth railway station#Transport links	Hurstbridge	7.55	4.69	1	8 May 1888	Northcote	Formerly: Northcote South; Westgarth Street
Westona	WTO	Main entrance to Westona station	Westona railway station#Transport links	Werribee	18.53	11.51	1/2	21 January 1985	Altona	Name the result of a public competition combining West and Altona.
Williams Landing	WLD	Williams Landing railway station Platform 1 (eastern view)(19 June 2026)	Williams Landing railway station#Transport links	Werribee	23.48	14.59	2	28 April 2013	Williams Landing	
Williamstown	WIL	Williamstown station seen from a hill south of the station	Williamstown railway station#Transport links	Williamstown	14.20	8.82	1	17 January 1859	Williamstown	
Williamstown Beach	WBH	Williamstown siemens train arriving at Williamstown beach platform 2 as viewed from Platform 1	Williamstown Beach railway station#Transport links	Williamstown	13.18	8.19	1	12 August 1889	Williamstown	Formerly Beach
Willison	WSN	Northbound view of station building on Platform 2		Alamein	12.15	7.55	1	8 June 1908	Camberwell	Formerly Golf Links
Windsor	WIN	Southbound view from Windsor platform 1	Windsor railway station, Melbourne#Transport links	Sandringham	7.49	4.65	1	19 December 1859	Windsor	Formerly Chapel Street
Yarraman	YMN	Platform 1 at Yarraman viewed from the south of the station	Yarraman railway station#Transport links	Cranbourne; Pakenham	29.04	18.04	2	21 December 1976	Noble Park	
Yarraville	YVE	Southbound view of Yarraville platform 2 facing towards platform 1	Yarraville railway station#Transport links	Werribee; Williamstown	7.54	4.69	1	20 November 1871	Yarraville	

== Future stations ==
denotes a metropolitan train connection

denotes a tram connection

denotes a bus connection

denotes a regional train connection

List of future stations
Name	Planned connections	Service(s)	Projected opening	Zone	Suburb
Keilor East		Melbourne Airport	2031	Not confirmed	Not confirmed
Melbourne Airport		Melbourne Airport	Not confirmed	Not confirmed	Melbourne Airport
Burwood (Deakin University)		Suburban Rail Loop East (Note: Will not be operated by Metro Trains Melbourne, instead being run by TransitLinX, a joint venture between John Holland and RATP Dev)	2035	Not confirmed	Burwood
Monash		Suburban Rail Loop East	2035	Not confirmed	Clayton

== Network map ==
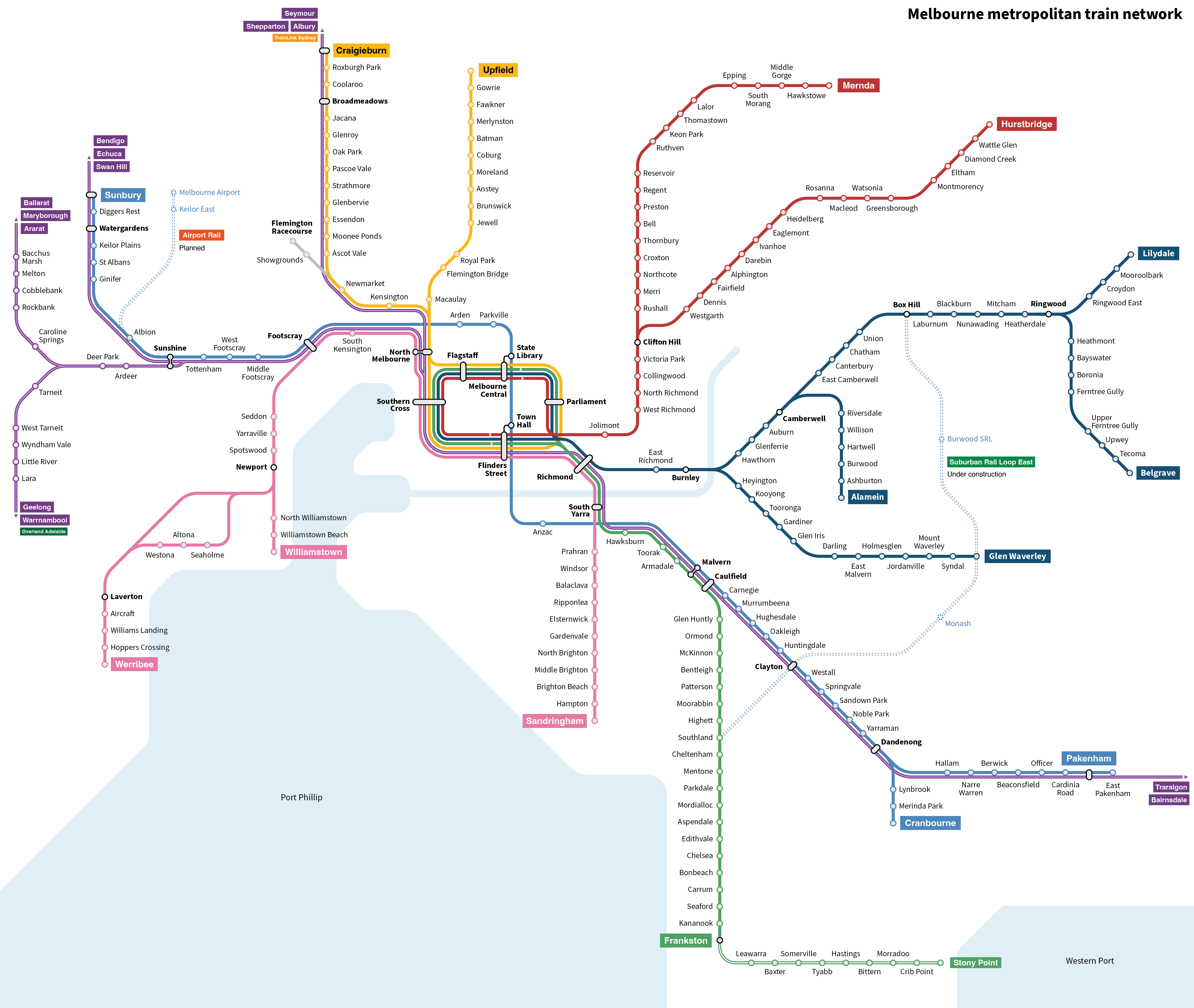
Schematic map of the Melbourne metropolitan train network showing current and under-construction lines.

== See also ==
- List of closed Melbourne railway stations
- List of proposed Melbourne rail extensions
- List of V/Line railway stations

=== Related ===
- List of suburban and commuter rail systems
- Transportation in Australia
