= Tecoma (disambiguation) =

Tecoma is a genus of 14 species of shrubs or small trees.

Tecoma may also refer to the following:

== Places ==
- Tecoma, Victoria, the suburb of Melbourne, Victoria Victoria, Australia

== People ==
- Tecoma (musician), an Australian independent roots singer-songwriter and guitarist

== Transportation ==
- Tecoma railway station in Melbourne, Victoria, Australia

== See also ==
- Tacoma (disambiguation)
- Tahoma (disambiguation)
- Takoma (disambiguation)
