= Tacoma =

Tacoma commonly refers to:

- Tacoma, Washington, a city in Pierce County, Washington, United States.
- Toyota Tacoma, a pickup truck manufactured since 1995

Tacoma may also refer to:

== Places ==
=== Australia ===
- Tacoma, New South Wales, a suburb of the Central Coast region of New South Wales, Australia.

=== United States ===
- Lake Tacoma, a proglacial lake in Washington state.
- Tacoma Lakes, a chain of lakes in Litchfield, Maine and Monmouth, Maine.
- Tacoma, Ohio, an unincorporated community
- Tacoma, Virginia, an unincorporated community
- Mount Rainier in Washington, also known as Tacoma or Tahoma

== Ships ==
- Tacoma-class frigate, a class of United States Navy ships
- MV Tacoma, a Washington State ferry in the United States
- USS Tacoma, several United States Navy warships
- Tacoma (steamship), a steamship built in 1913

== Other uses ==
- Tacoma Dome, an indoor arena in Tacoma, Washington
- Tacoma Stars, an indoor soccer team in Kent, Washington
- Tacoma Guitars, a manufacturer of acoustic guitars in Tacoma, Washington
- Tacoma Motley, Mike and Mabel Motley's daughter-in-law, and Truman Motley's wife in the 1976-2000 comic strip, Motley's Crew
- Tacoma (video game), a video game by Fullbright released in 2017
- Tacoma nyssaecolella, a moth in the family Pyralidae
- Tacoma FD, an American television sitcom

== See also ==
- Tacoma Narrows, a narrow passage in Puget Sound in the US near Tacoma, Washington
  - Tacoma Narrows bridges, a series of bridges over the narrows
- Tahoma (disambiguation)
- Takoma (disambiguation)
- Tecoma (disambiguation)
