= Upwey =

Upwey may refer to:

- Upwey, Dorset, England
- Upwey, Victoria, Australia
  - Upwey railway station, Melbourne
