= Horatio Jones =

Horatio Jones may refer to:

- Horatio Jones (pioneer) (1763–1836), soldier and pioneer in Western New York
- Horatio M. Jones (1826–1906), Justice of the Territorial Supreme Court of Nevada
- Buck Jones (American football) (1888–1985), NFL football player in 1922

== See also ==
- Horatio Jones house, Tecoma, Victoria, Australia, built from kerosene cans
