= UPW =

UPW may refer to:

- Ultimate Pro Wrestling, a defunct professional wrestling promotion
- Ultrapure Water, a type of water used during semiconductor manufacturing or chem./physics experiencies
- Union of Post Office Workers, the former name of the Union of Communication Workers, in the United Kingdom
- Union Pacific West Line, a rail line in Chicago, Illinois, US
- United Public Workers (later United Public Workers of America)
- UPW, the National Rail station code for Upwey railway station, Dorset, England
- Upwey railway station, Melbourne
- UP Warriorz, Indian cricket franchise
