= Takoma =

Takoma may refer to:

- Takoma Park, Maryland, a city located in Montgomery County, Maryland
- Takoma, Washington, D.C., a neighborhood in Washington, D.C.
- Takoma (Washington Metro), a stop on the Red Line of the Washington Metro subway system
- Takoma Records, a record label founded by John Fahey
- "Takoma", a song by the American band Bright from the album The Albatross Guest House

== See also ==
- Tacoma (disambiguation)
- Tahoma (disambiguation)
- Tecoma (disambiguation)
