= Actrix (moth) =

Scientific classification
- Kingdom: Animalia
- Phylum: Arthropoda
- Clade: Pancrustacea
- Class: Insecta
- Order: Lepidoptera
- Family: Pyralidae
- Subfamily: Phycitinae
- Genus: Aactrix; Heinrich, 1956

Genus of moths

Actrix is a snout moth genus in the subfamily Phycitinae. It was described by Carl Heinrich in 1956. It contains two species: Actrix nyssaecolella, which was originally described as Tacoma nyssaecolella by Harrison Gray Dyar Jr. in 1904, and Actrix dissimulatrix.

== Species ==
- Actrix nyssaecolella (Dyar, 1904) – tupelo leaffolder moth
- Actrix dissimulatrix Heinrich, 1956
