= Actrix dissimulatrix =

Scientific classification
- Domain: Eukaryota
- Kingdom: Animalia
- Phylum: Arthropoda
- Class: Insecta
- Order: Lepidoptera
- Family: Pyralidae
- Genus: Aactrix
- Species: A. dissimulatrix

Binomial name
- Actrix dissimulatrix Heinrich, 1956

Species of moth

Actrix dissimulatrix is a species of snout moth in the genus Actrix. It was described by Carl Heinrich in 1956. It is found in North America, including the type location of Virginia.
