= Belmont County Children's Home =

Coordinates: 39.9995°N 81.1447°W

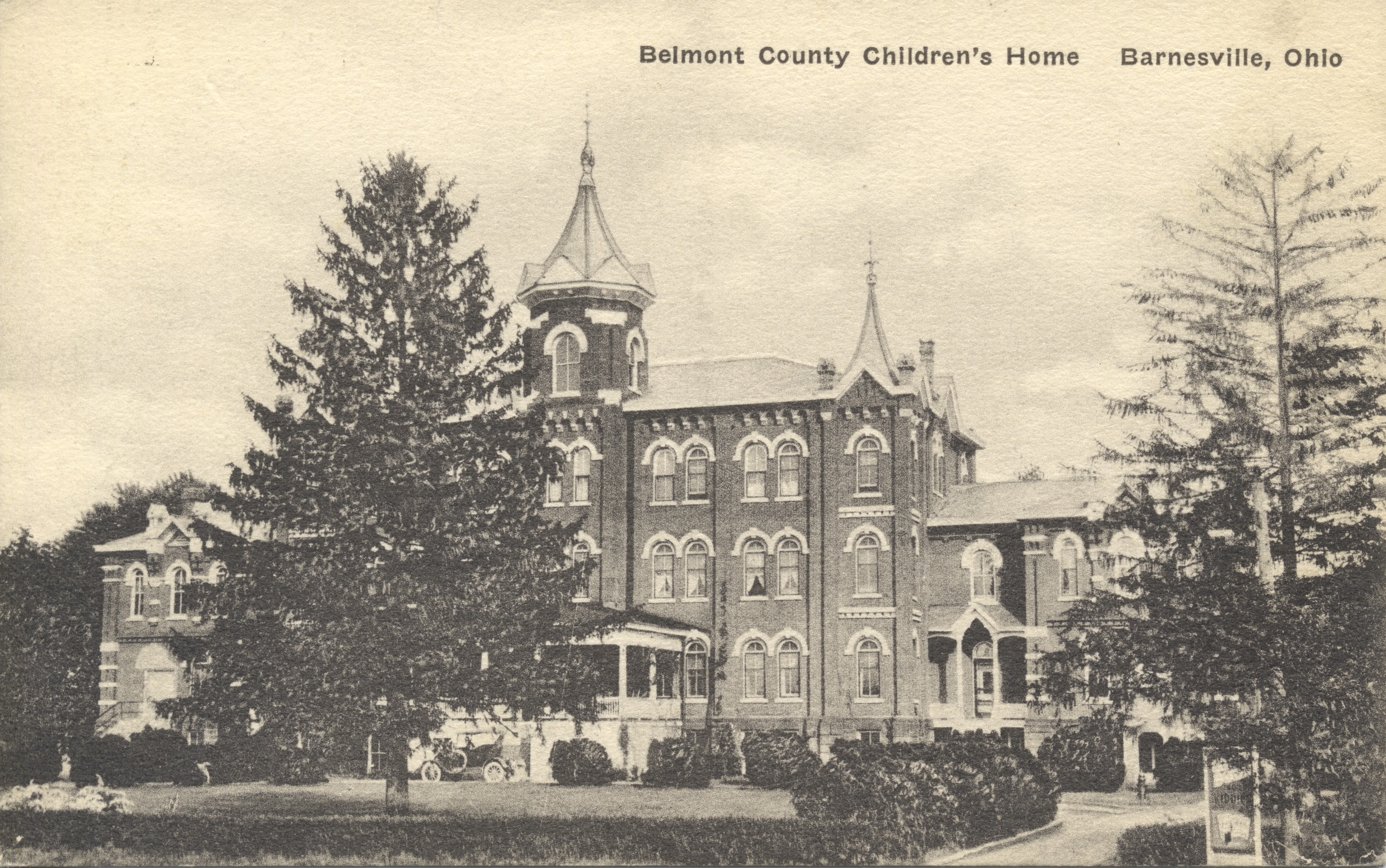
Belmont County Children's Home (labelled Barnesville, Ohio)

Belmont County Children's Home (1880–1981) was an orphanage, located in Tacoma in Belmont County, east of Barnesville, Ohio, United States. It was a brick building with a cupola on each of the central 4-story towers and two three-story wings. It was built on a 65-acre site with hilltop views. A children's cemetery remains.

The orphanage closed in 1981 and the empty buildings were demolished in 1990. The children's home is commemorated in a mural commissioned by the Barnesville Village Council, on the west side of the Domino's Pizza building at 146 W. Main St. in downtown Barnesville.

== History ==
The building was designed by J.W. Yost, (1847–1923), a prominent architect from Ohio whose works included other public buildings. Distinctive in appearance, it was pictured on postcards. A children's cemetery was adjacent.

The cornerstone of the Children's Home was laid down in June 1879. After the building was demolished, the cornerstone was kept in a Lodge and then relocated to the Watt Center for History and the Arts. The property where the home was located was transferred to the Port Authority and targeted for redevelopment in 2018.

Inez Palmer, who confessed to the Axtel Ridge Murders, had stayed at the home, and was "farmed out" to families but said she found herself pursued by various males at the homes where she resided.
