= Chelsea railway station, Melbourne =

Railway station in Melbourne, Australia

Chelsea
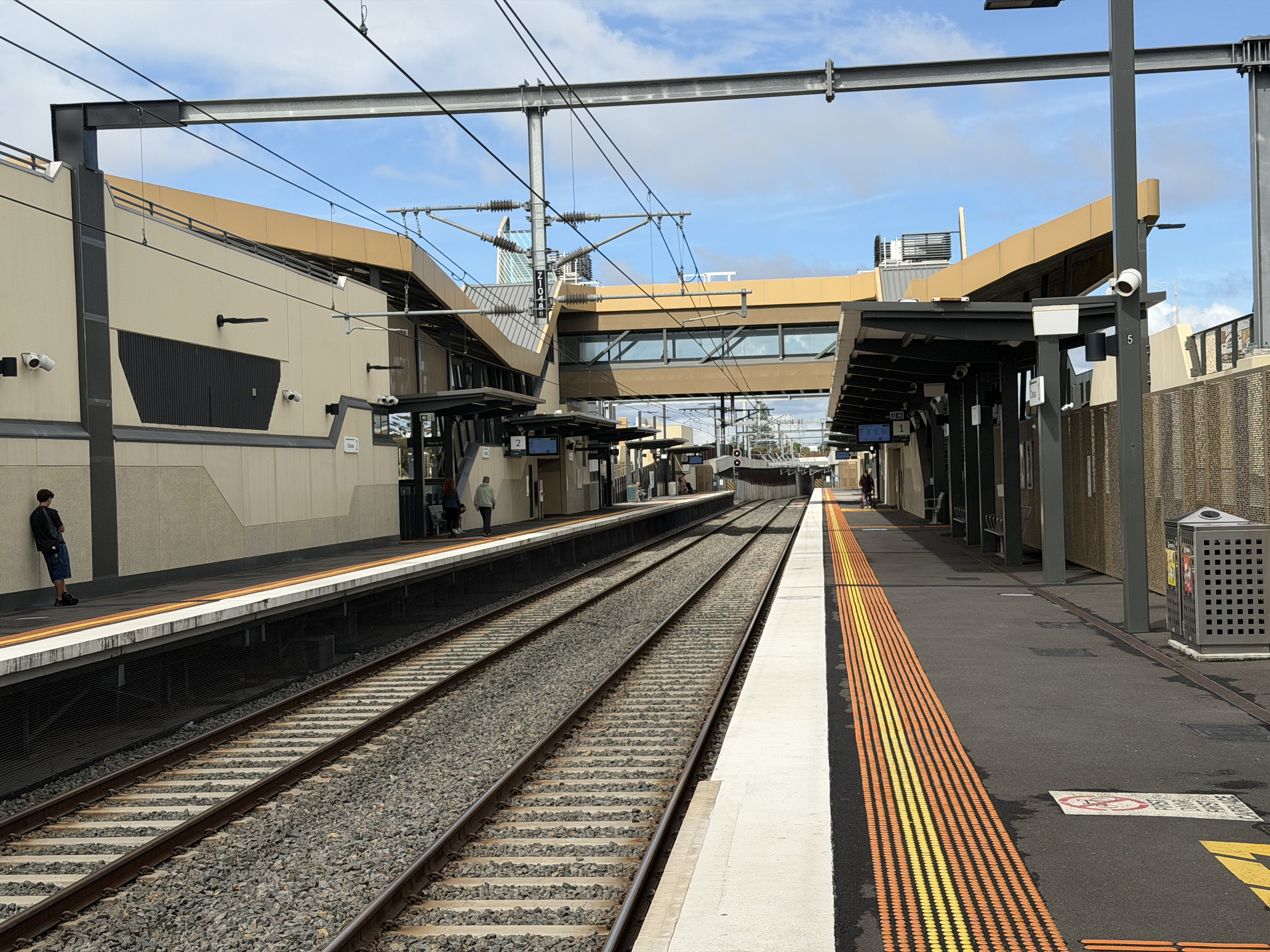
- Southbound view from Platform 1, April 2026

General information
- Location: Nepean Highway, Chelsea, Victoria 3196; City of Kingston; Australia
- Coordinates: 38°03′07″S 145°06′57″E
- System: PTV commuter rail station
- Owner: VicTrack
- Operator: Metro Trains
- Line: Frankston
- Distance: 33.37 kilometres from Southern Cross
- Platforms: 2 side
- Tracks: 2
- Connections: Bus; SkyBus

Construction
- Structure type: Below ground
- Parking: 130
- Cycle facilities: Yes
- Accessible: Yes — step free access

Other information
- Status: Operational, unstaffed
- Station code: CSA
- Fare zone: Myki zone 2
- Website: Public Transport Victoria

History
- Opened: 4 February 1907; 119 years ago
- Rebuilt: 22 November 2021 (LXRP)
- Electrified: August 1922 (1500 V DC overhead)

Passengers
- 2005–2006: 493,486
- 2006–2007: 506,010 ▲2.53%
- 2007–2008: 552,391 ▲9.16%
- 2008–2009: 602,890 ▲9.14%
- 2009–2010: 590,777 ▼2%
- 2010–2011: 646,085 ▲9.36%
- 2011–2012: 635,867 ▼1.58%
- 2012–2013: Not measured
- 2013–2014: 510,183 ▼19.76%
- 2014–2015: 483,888 ▼5.15%
- 2015–2016: 500,720 ▲3.47%
- 2016–2017: 490,790 ▼1.98%
- 2017–2018: 511,421 ▲4.2%
- 2018–2019: 488,610 ▼4.46%
- 2019–2020: 352,400 ▼27.87%
- 2020–2021: 186,300 ▼47.13%
- 2021–2022: 161,650 ▼13.23%
- 2022–2023: 316,650 ▲96.06%
- 2023–2024: 340,500 ▲7.53%
- 2024–2025: 352,250 ▲3.45%

Services
Preceding station	Metro Trains	Following station
Edithvale towards Flinders Street via City Loop	Frankston line	Bonbeach towards Frankston
Track layout
Location

Chelsea station is a railway station operated by Metro Trains Melbourne on the Frankston line, part of the Melbourne rail network. It serves the south-eastern suburb of Chelsea, in Melbourne, Victoria, Australia. Chelsea station is a ground level unstaffed station, featuring two side platforms. It opened on 4 February 1907, with the current station provided in November 2021.

== History ==
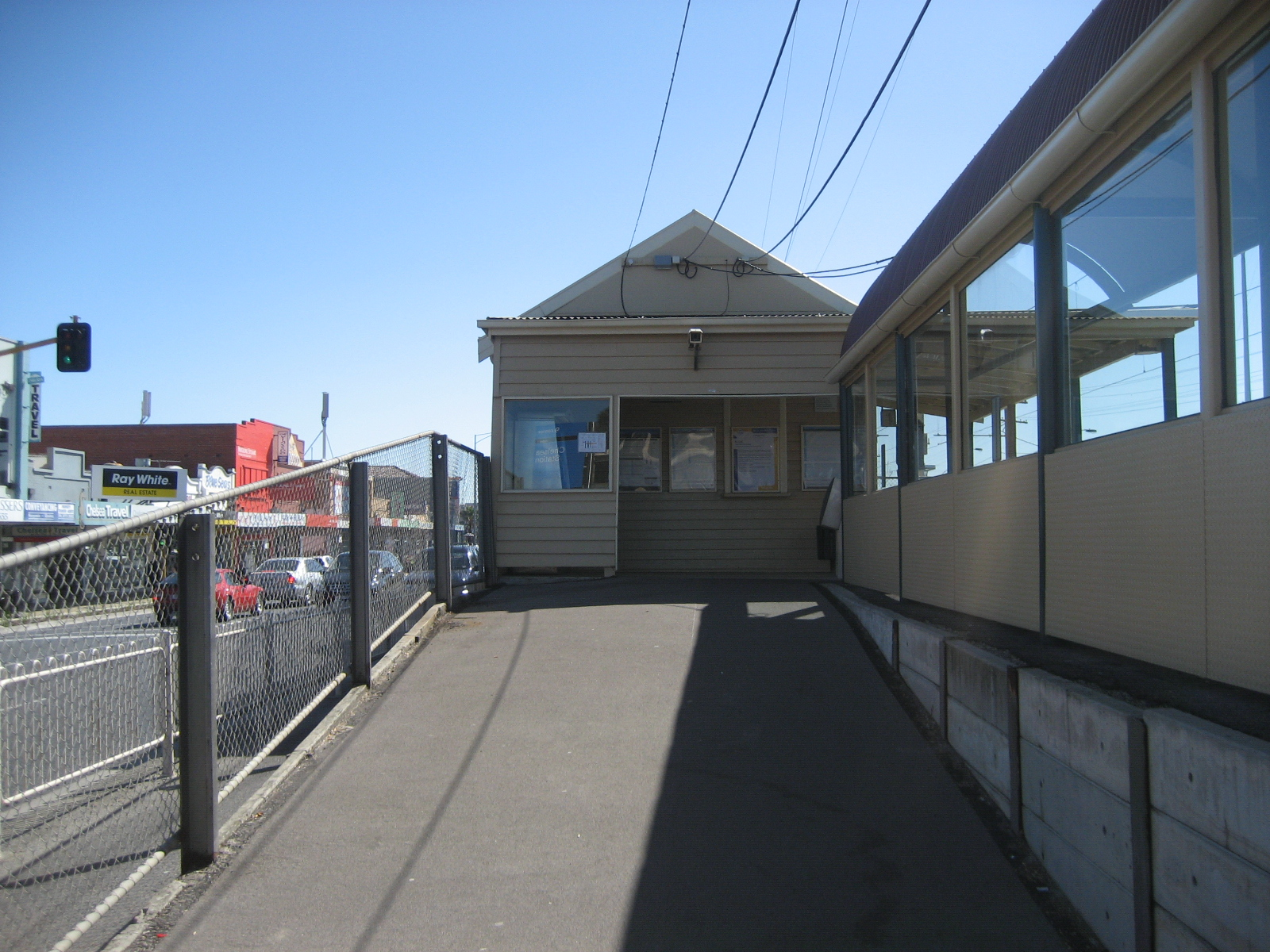
Former station building and Nepean Highway entrance to the former ground level Platform 1, August 2007

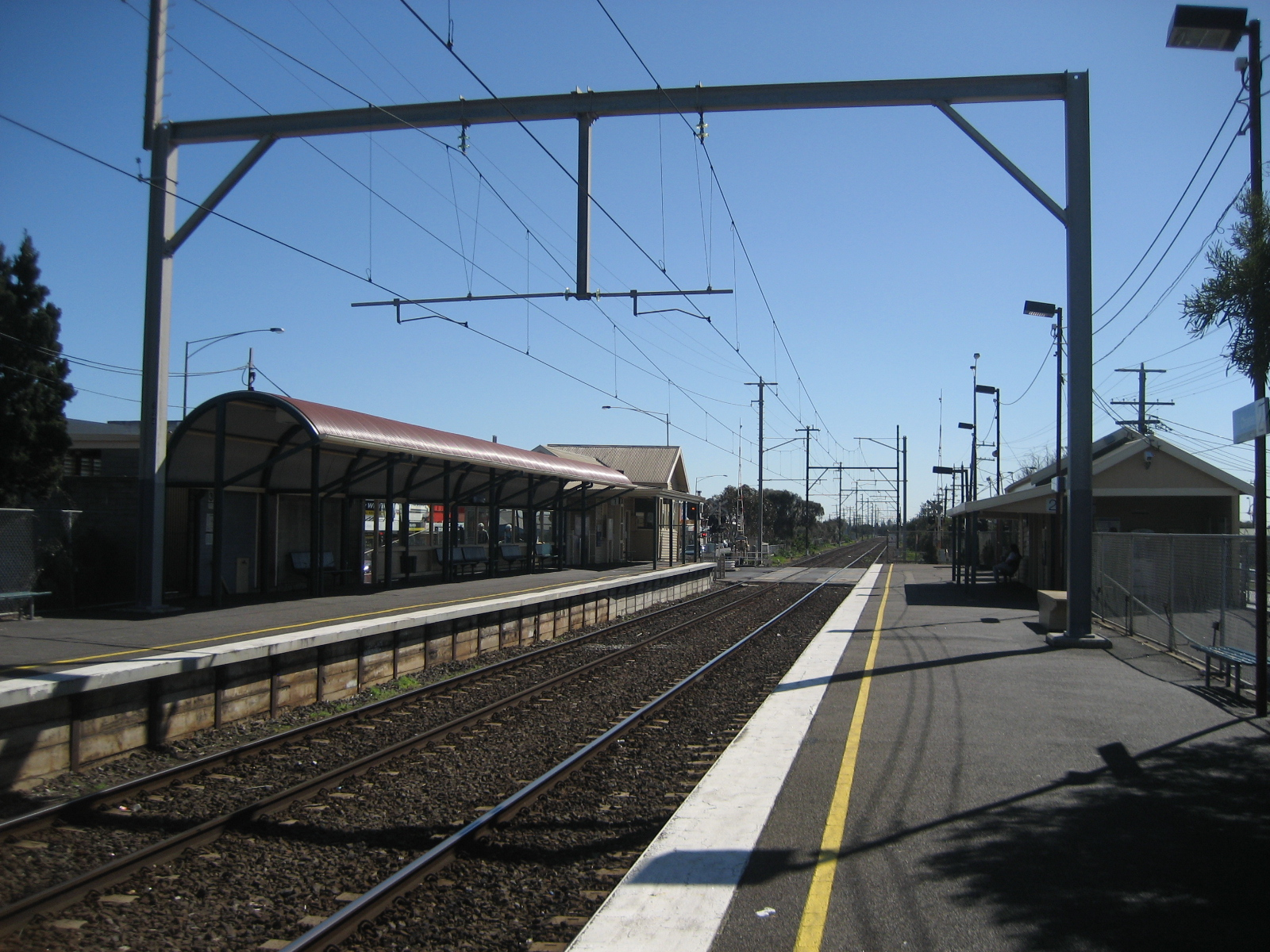
Northbound view from the former ground level Platform 2, September 2007

Chelsea station opened on 4 February 1907 and, like the suburb itself, was named after Chelsea in London, England. The name was suggested by local farmer Bertha Black, whose mother was originally from Chelsea.

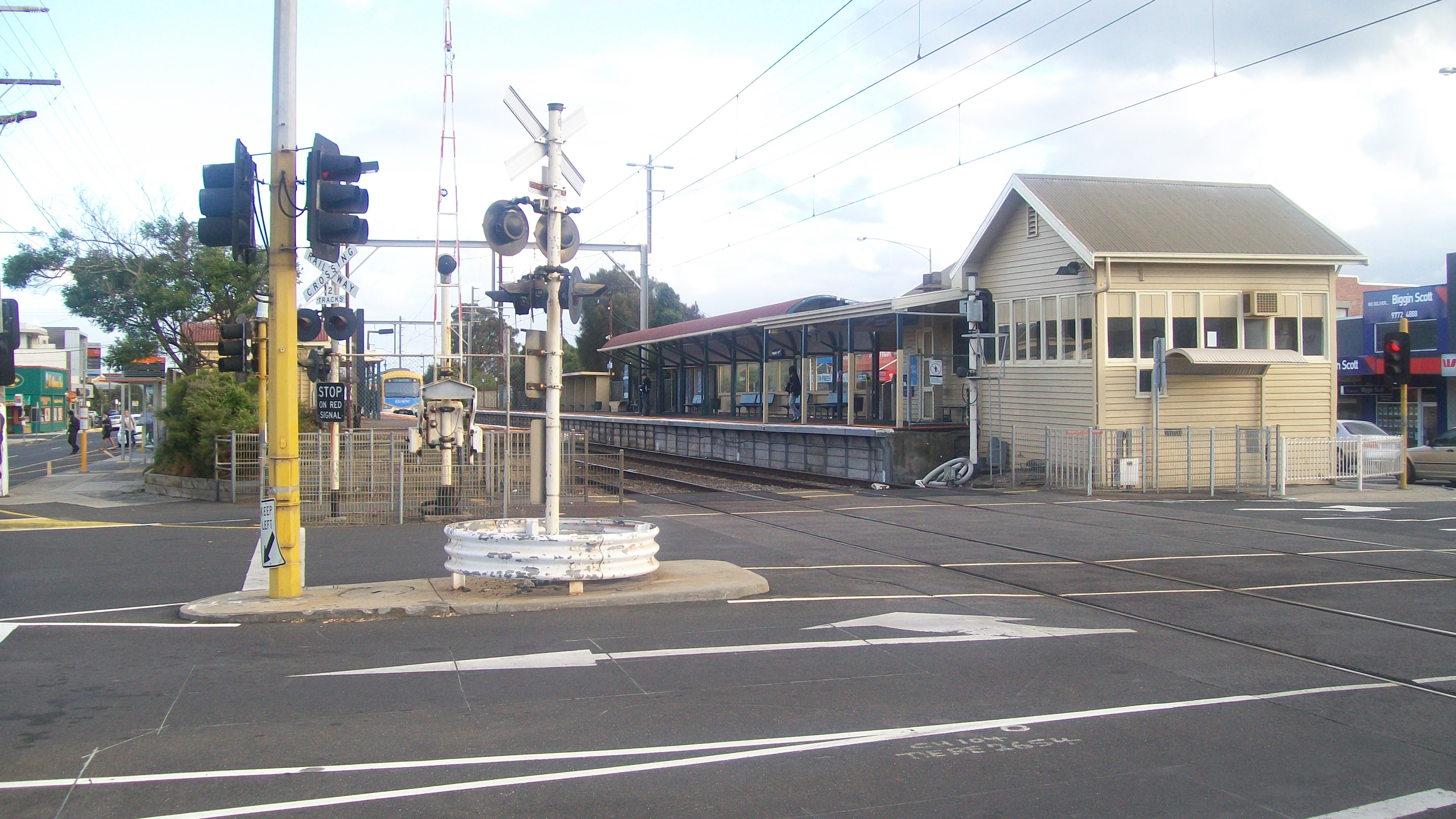
The former Chelsea Road level crossing boom gate barriers were installed in 1977. Viewed southbound in March 2010

In 1977, boom barriers replaced interlocked gates at the former Chelsea Road level crossing, which was located at the up end of the station. The interlocked frame was also abolished at this time, replaced by a control panel within the former signal box.

In 1984, the overhead wire for a siding at the station was removed and, in 1987, the siding was abolished.

In 2003, the control panel was permanently switched out. In 2004, a crossover that was located at the Frankston end of the station was abolished.

As part of the 2010/11 State Budget, $83.7 million was allocated to upgrade Chelsea to a premium station, along with nineteen others. However, in March 2011, this was scrapped by the Baillieu Government.

The station was rebuilt, and the Chelsea Road level crossing removed, as part of the Level Crossing Removal Project In 2020, construction started and, on 25 July 2021, the station was closed for demolition. On 22 November of that year, the rebuilt station opened to passengers, along with nearby Edithvale and Bonbeach. The line was rebuilt below in a trench, with the level crossing permanently closed to road vehicles, and nearby Thames Promenade extended to the Nepean Highway.

== Platforms and services ==
Chelsea has two side platforms. It is serviced by Metro Trains' Frankston line services.

Chelsea platform arrangement
Platform	Line	Destination	Via	Service Type	Source
1	Frankston line	Flinders Street	City Loop	All stations and limited express services	
2	Frankston line	Frankston or Carrum		All stations	

== Transport links ==
Kinetic Melbourne operates one SmartBus route to and from Chelsea station, under contract to Public Transport Victoria:

- SmartBus 902 : to Westfield Airport West

Ventura Bus Lines operates three routes via Chelsea station, under contract to Public Transport Victoria:

- 706 : to Mordialloc (off-peak only)
- 857 : to Dandenong station
- 858 : Edithvale – Aspendale Gardens

SkyBus also operates a service to Melbourne Airport via Chelsea station.
