= Bonbeach railway station =

Railway station in Melbourne, Australia

Bonbeach
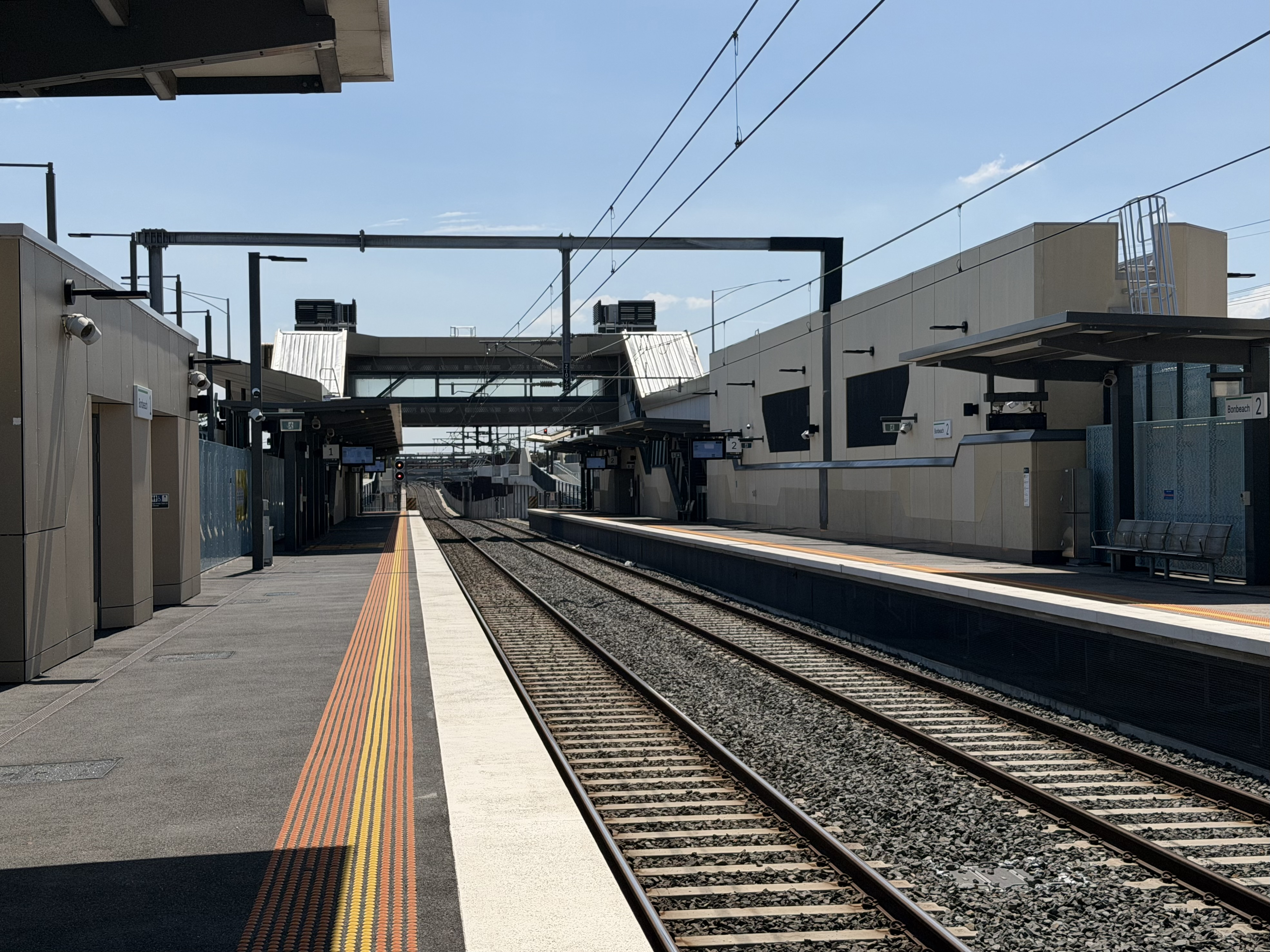
- Northbound view from Platform 1, February 2026

General information
- Location: Nepean Highway, Bonbeach, Victoria 3196; City of Kingston; Australia
- Coordinates: 38°03′46″S 145°07′11″E
- System: PTV commuter rail station
- Owner: VicTrack
- Operator: Metro Trains
- Line: Frankston
- Distance: 34.61 kilometres from Southern Cross
- Platforms: 2 side
- Tracks: 2

Construction
- Structure type: Below ground
- Parking: 30
- Cycle facilities: 12 unenclosed racks
- Accessible: Yes—step free access

Other information
- Status: Operational, unstaffed
- Station code: BON
- Fare zone: Myki zone 2
- Website: Public Transport Victoria

History
- Opened: 15 February 1926; 100 years ago
- Rebuilt: 1981; 22 November 2021 (LXRP)
- Electrified: August 1922 (1500 V DC overhead)

Passengers
- 2005–2006: 240,638
- 2006–2007: 249,845 ▲3.82%
- 2007–2008: 277,285 ▲11.2%
- 2008–2009: 323,577 ▲16.46%
- 2009–2010: 347,199 ▲7.3%
- 2010–2011: 352,352 ▲1.48%
- 2011–2012: 327,568 ▼7.03%
- 2012–2013: Not measured
- 2013–2014: 207,265 ▼36.72%
- 2014–2015: 202,350 ▼2.37%
- 2015–2016: 200,695 ▼0.81%
- 2016–2017: 195,103 ▼2.78%
- 2017–2018: 215,211 ▲10.3%
- 2018–2019: 205,245 ▼4.63%
- 2019–2020: 220,450 ▲7.4%
- 2020–2021: 71,450 ▼67.58%
- 2021–2022: 67,050 ▼6.15%
- 2022–2023: 121,600 ▲81.35%
- 2023–2024: 134,500 ▲10.61%
- 2024–2025: 141,600 ▲5.28%

Services
Preceding station	Metro Trains	Following station
Chelsea towards Flinders Street via City Loop	Frankston line	Carrum towards Frankston
Track layout
Location

Bonbeach station is railway station operated by Metro Trains Melbourne on the Frankston line, part of the Melbourne rail network. It serves the south-eastern suburb of Bonbeach, in Melbourne, Victoria, Australia. Bonbeach station is a ground level unstaffed station, featuring two side platforms. It opened on 15 February 1926, with the current station provided in November 2021.

== History ==
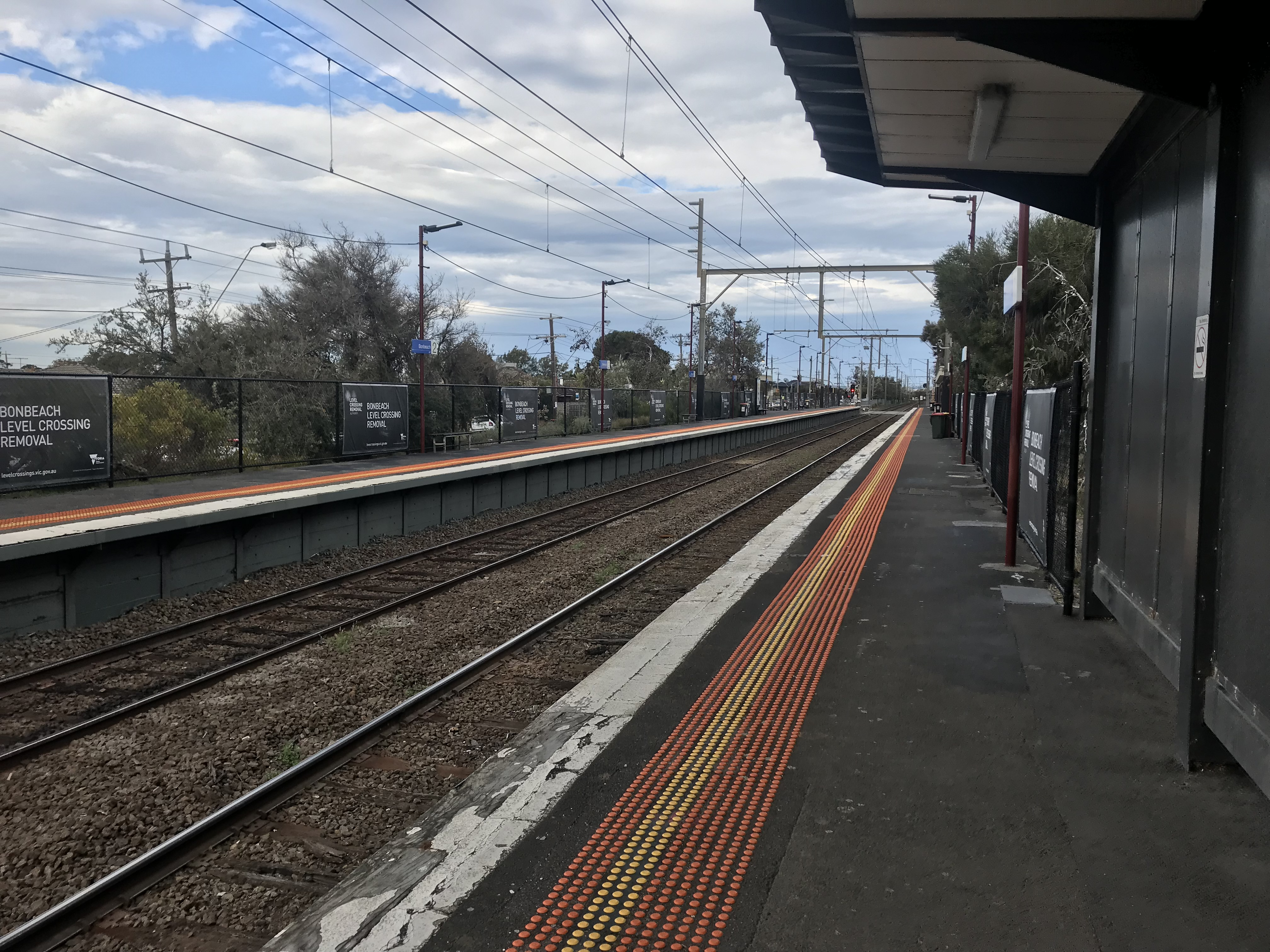
Southbound view from the former ground level Platform 1, July 2018

Bonbeach station originally opened on 15 February 1926, and was named by the Commissioners of the Victorian Railways, following a referendum to decide on a name. The other entries for the referendum included Bondi, Heathdale, Bonheath, Baybeach and Bayside.

In 1977, boom barriers replaced hand gates at the former Bondi Road level crossing, which was located at the down end of the station. A control panel was also provided in that year. In 1981, the former ground level station buildings were rebuilt. In 1982, the control panel was abolished.

In 2015, new passenger amenities were added to the former ground level station, including passenger information displays, additional myki readers, a network status board and an additional shelter at the up end of Platform 1. Safety improvements, including additional CCTV cameras as well as tactile platform edges, were also provided.

As part of the Level Crossing Removal Project, the station was reconstructed to remove the adjacent level crossing at Bondi Road, with works commencing on 26 July 2021. The removal was done simultaneously alongside the grade separation of Chelsea and Edithvale. On 22 November of that year, the rebuilt station opened to passengers. The new station consists of two side platforms lowered into a trench, with Bondi Road passing overhead nearby. The former pedestrian level crossing at Golden Avenue was converted into a pedestrian overpass, whilst the crossing at Broadway was abolished.

The station was used in the Australian television comedy series Kath & Kim in episode two of series four, as the location of a Gloria Jean's coffee cart grand opening party.

== Platforms and services ==
Bonbeach has two side platforms. It is serviced by Metro Trains' Frankston line services.

Bonbeach platform arrangement
Platform	Line	Destination	Via	Service Type	Notes	Source
1	Frankston line	Flinders Street	City Loop	All stations and limited express services		
2	Frankston line	Carrum or Frankston		All stations	Services to Carrum only operate during weekday peaks.	
