= Tahoma =

Tahoma is a name for the volcano otherwise known as Mount Rainier. The nearby city of Tacoma, Washington, was named for the volcano. Tahoma can also refer to:

== Places ==
- Tahoma, an alternative spelling of Tacoma, the original name of Mount Rainier
  - Little Tahoma Peak, a satellite peak of Mount Rainier
  - Tahoma Glacier, a glacier on Mount Rainier
  - South Tahoma Glacier, a glacier on Mount Rainier
- Mount Tahoma High School, a high school in the district of Tacoma, Washington
- Tahoma, California, a town on the west shore of Lake Tahoe
- Tahoma National Cemetery, a cemetery in Kent, Washington
- Tahoma School District, a school district in Maple Valley, Washington
  - Tahoma High School, a high school in this district
- Lake Tahoma, a lake in western North Carolina

== Computers ==
- Tahoma (typeface), a typeface bundled with Microsoft Windows

== Transport ==
- Air Tahoma, an American-based cargo transport airline
- USS Tahoma (1861), a steamer acquired by the Union Navy during the American Civil War
- USCGC Tahoma (WPG-80), a United States Coast Guard cutter completed in 1934
- USCGC Tahoma (WMEC-908), a United States Coast Guard medium endurance cutter commissioned in 1988

== See also ==
- Tacoma (disambiguation)
- Takoma (disambiguation)
