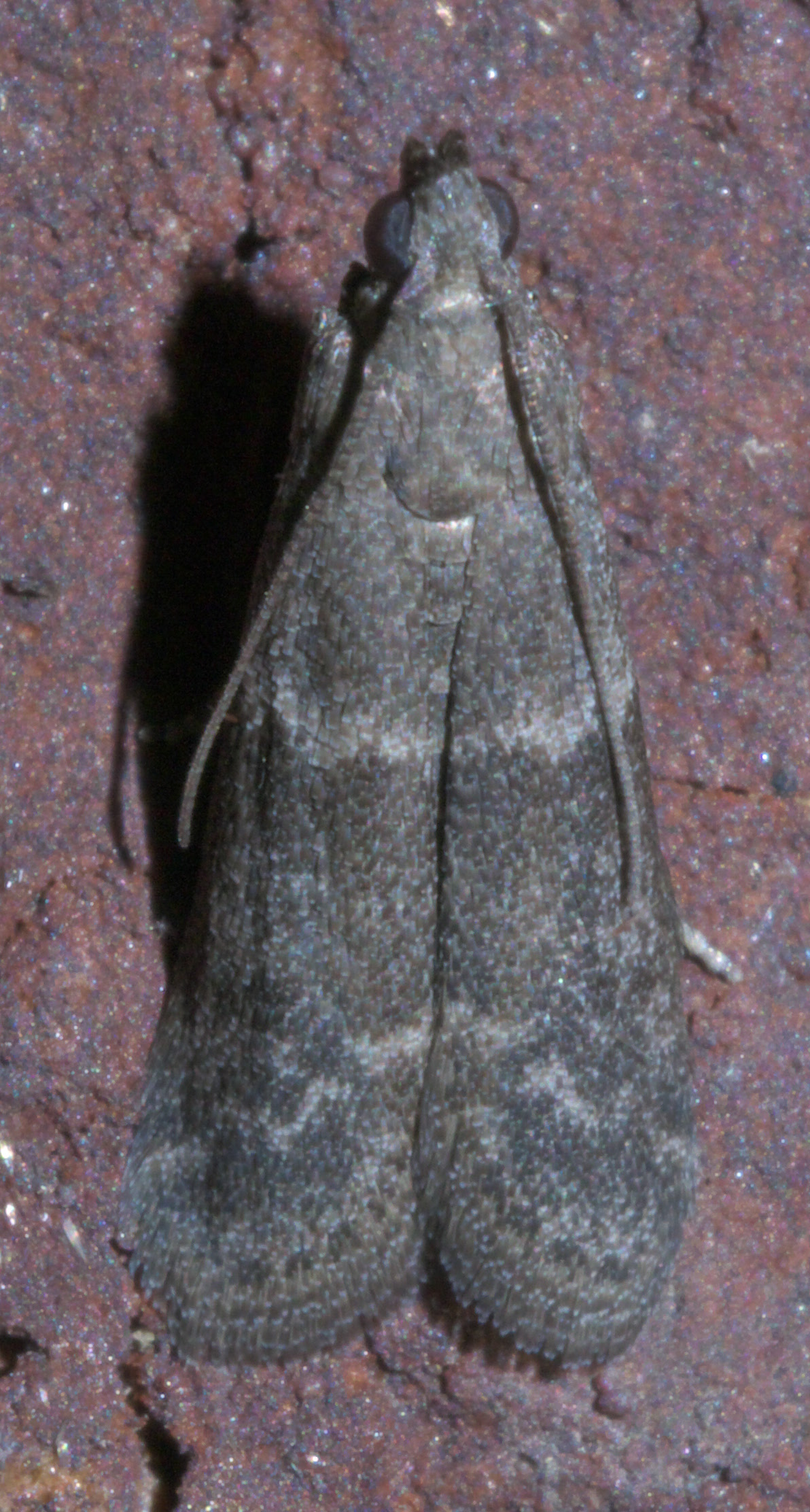

Scientific classification
- Kingdom: Animalia
- Phylum: Arthropoda
- Clade: Pancrustacea
- Class: Insecta
- Order: Lepidoptera
- Family: Pyralidae
- Genus: Aactrix
- Species: A. nyssaecolella

Binomial name
- Actrix nyssaecolella (Dyar, 1904)

Synonyms
- Tacoma nyssaecolella Dyar, 1904

= Actrix nyssaecolella =

Species of moth

Actrix nyssaecolella, the tupelo leaffolder moth, is a species of moth of the family Pyralidae described by Harrison Gray Dyar Jr. in 1904. It is found from Michigan and New York to Florida and west to Texas.

The larvae feed on Nyssa species.
