= Horatio Jones house =

Heritage-listed house in Tecoma, Victoria, Australia

Horatio Jones' house
- Location of the house in Greater Metropolitan Melbourne
- Interactive map of the Horatio Jones' house area

General information
- Status: Completed
- Type: Shanty house
- Location: 14–16 Blackwood Street, Tecoma, Yarra Ranges, Melbourne, Victoria, Australia
- Coordinates: 37°53′52″S 145°20′37″E
- Year built: 1920–1926
- Completed: 1926; 100 years ago

Technical details
- Material: Bush timber; kerosene tins; stone; fencing wire; sheet metal
- Floor count: 2
- Floor area: 48.75 m^{2} (524.7 sq ft)
- Grounds: c.1 ha (2.5 acres)

Design and construction
- Architect: Horatio Thomas Jones

Victorian Heritage Register
- Official name: Horatio Jones' House
- Type: Registered place
- Designated: 25 March 1993
- Reference no.: H0957
- Heritage overlay no.: HO6
- Category: Residential buildings (private)

Register of the National Estate
- Official name: Horatio Jones House
- Type: Defunct register
- Designated: 28 May 1996
- Reference no.: 18157

The Horatio Jones' house is a shanty house located at 14–16 Blackwood Street in Tecoma, in the Yarra Ranges, in the north eastern suburbs of Melbourne, in Victoria, Australia. The house was built between 1920 to 1926 on the traditional lands of the Wurundjeri people, by Australian inventor, engineer and recluse Horatio Thomas Jones.

The house was added to the Victorian Heritage Register on 25 March 1993 in recognition of its historical and architectural significance; and was also added to non-statutory lists by the Victorian branch of the National Trust on 27 June 1985 and the now defunct Register of the National Estate on 28 May 1996.

== History ==
=== Horatio Jones ===
The life of Horatio Jones is part of the folk lore of the Dandenong Ranges. Jones was born in Naracoorte, South Australia in 1870. At some stage the family moved to Victoria. In 1888, as a youth, he demonstrated his ingenuity by exhibiting a model windmill at the Juvenile Industrial Exhibition in Melbourne. He was awarded the Silver Medal, displayed in the house. Jones served an apprenticeship for three years in a metal trade, with the Atlas Company. As an adult, he described himself as an engineer and he resided at 2 Leopold Street, South Yarra.

Jones enlisted in the Australian Army in World War I and saw active service during the Battle of Gallipoli from August 1915, at the age of forty-five. Asked to swim carrying a signal cable across a flooded gully under heavy Turkish fire, Jones swum underwater the whole time, fearing to lift his head. However, this worsened his heart condition, suffered prior to enlisting, and he was subsequently discharged as totally and permanently incapacitated with cardiac problems and rheumatic fever. Jones was briefly engaged to Caroline Hearst and broke off his engagement upon his return to Melbourne in 1916, fearing he would not live much longer, he ended the engagement and Hearst returned to America.

Jones' father died whilst in Gallipoli, and a business associate absconded with the family finances. His mother died soon after his return to Australia. Jones' two half sisters, Christina and Annie, both had their fiancees killed in action at Gallipoli.

=== Dandenong Ranges house ===
Jones sold the South Yarra home and, in 1920, he purchased 3 hectares (7.4 acres) in the Dandenong Ranges and built the home for himself and his two sisters. He never married. This area was familiar to Jones because he went for weekends there with his parents and family friend Ferdinand von Mueller, the founder of Melbourne's Royal Botanic Gardens. The Dandenongs had been known since the late nineteenth century as a place of guest houses and as a bush retreat for Melbourne's leisured classes. Having little money remaining, Jones built a new house from available and inexpensive materials. Using levers, rollers and tools he created, he flattened and straightened the kerosene tins and folded the edges so that one tin sheet would lock into the other and seal the walls. Kerosene tins later became a building and furnishing material associated with the Great Depression. Tins were recycled when other materials were scarce or not affordable. The house was serviced with hot water. It is understood that a water wheel at the creek generated electricity.

Much of the furniture from the South Yarra house was moved into the Tecoma house and Jones and his sisters continued their genteel lifestyle which included musical soirees, sumptuous dinners and silver service afternoon teas. They made their own liqueurs, wines and cider. Sir John Monash, a prominent engineer, was reputedly a friend of Jones. Poet and writer C. J. Dennis was a frequent caller as were painters Sir Arthur Streeton and Tom Roberts, the latter would drive his gig from nearby Kallista. Hepzibah Menuhin, a famous pianist, would give recitals. Jones and his sisters would entertain these people in the study, an outdoor structure made of poles, with a large table inside. Jones' House was known as a meeting place for the local arts community. Jones planted many fruit trees, grew vegetables and kept bees, geese and chickens. The house featured an exotic and sensual garden. A banana passionfruit creeper with shocking pink flowers formed a canopy and visitors recollect trailers and creepers forming garlands from tree to tree. Later the fire brigade requested that the vines be removed because they created a fire hazard. When Christina and Annie became too old for the stairs to the upper level of the house, Jones built them a separate house of one storey. This is believed to have survived somewhere in Tecoma but its location is unknown.

Jones lived at his house until shortly before his death in 1949. His sisters had died some years earlier. Jones was a dashing and interesting man whose manner and behaviour was not unlike that of a duke.

The custodians of Horatio Jones' House maintained the house and gardens since the early 1950s and ensured that the house and contents are much as Jones left them. Some surrounding land has been subdivided for suburban housing and the house sits on a 1 hectare (2.5 acres) site. When threatened by the Melbourne and Metropolitan Board of Works sewerage pipes in 1982 , which were to be laid along Little Ferny Creek, Jones' heirs were concerned that trees would be felled and heavy machinery would destroy the gully. They contacted Shell Australia, which was the featured brand on one of the kerosene tins and asked for assistance. This resulted in an article in Shell's in-house magazine. The magazine's editor became personally involved in preserving Jones' house and this led to the formation of a group of Friends of the House and its subsequent listing on various heritage registers.

== Description ==
The two storey house is set on approximately one hectare (two point five acres) and constructed of flattened four-gallon kerosene tins using hand-made tools.

Horatio Jones House was constructed by Horatio Jones in the 1920s of stone, bush timber, fencing wire and sheet metal. It is a large shanty with its exterior walls clad in flattened four gallon kerosene tins, some still bearing their original advertising brands. The dwelling comprises two floors, each measuring approximately 7.5 by 6.5 metres (25 by 21 ft) with no dividing walls, with exposed timber beams on the perimeter internal walls and ceilings. Framing for the building is constructed from sapling poles and logs from native trees while the floor framing of the upper storey is constructed from rough sawn timber and logs. The roof is low pitched and gabled and its framing is a composite structure of timber pole framing and fencing wire criss-crossing for bracing. The upper floor features window openings with awning hatches clad in recycled kerosene tins. This level was the quarters for Jones' two half sisters. The lower floor, which was Jones' abode, has a cement floor and has an open fire place made of stone. Some internal walls are finished with salvaged timber panelling of the type common in the early 1920s. A bath tub is located adjacent to the fire place and is screened from the main living area on that level by an oriental screen.

=== Outbuildings ===
There is a restored pole structure near the house which Jones called his study. A small companionable two seater dunny is located within a separate structure which has also been restored. A plaque with the word Bliss is above the dunny, believed to have been placed there by C. J. Dennis. A third structure, C. J. Dennis' hut, was reported on the other side of Little Ferny Creek; also restored.

=== Interior fittings and furniture ===
The interior and furniture reflects its genteel South Yarra origins which were transposed from the Jones residence there to house in Tecoma. The furniture includes a piano, a port table, dining setting, brass beds and a large bed with blackwood posts. An oil painting is hung near the bath's screen and is believed to be a portrait of Caroline Hearst. An American flag is draped above the bed in canopy style (an accompanying Union Jack was stolen) and other wartime memorabilia is on display. The house is softened with Persian rugs, Venetian glass, crystal, fine crockery, jewellery, pictures, Italian brocade furnishing fabric and an oriental patterned screen. It is understood that tools for cutting the kerosene tins and Jones' invention, the patent rabbit exterminator, are in situ.

=== Gardens ===
The house is sited at the bottom of a suburban garden alongside the rear fence. It is surrounded by remnants of the fern gully and shielded by eucalypts and populated with native birds including magpies and red breasted parrots. This setting is a remnant of the Dandenongs landscape at Tecoma which has been otherwise subdivided for housing. Wild flowers along the creek's side, including native orchids, add to the natural delicate atmosphere. Rhododendrons are planted down the property's driveway. The older ones were planted by Jones. The house is situated on the banks of Little Ferny Creek and is approached by a simple wooden footbridge.

== See also ==
- Architecture of Melbourne
- List of places on the Victorian Heritage Register in the Shire of Yarra Ranges
