= Tacoma, Ohio =

Unincorporated community in Ohio, U.S.

Coordinates: 39°59′50″N 81°08′47″W

Tacoma is an unincorporated community in Belmont County, in the U.S. state of Ohio.

== History ==
A post office called Tacoma was established in 1887, and remained in operation until 1963. Besides the post office, Tacoma had the Belmont County Children's Home for indigent children.
