= Tecoma, Victoria =

Tecoma
- Suburb
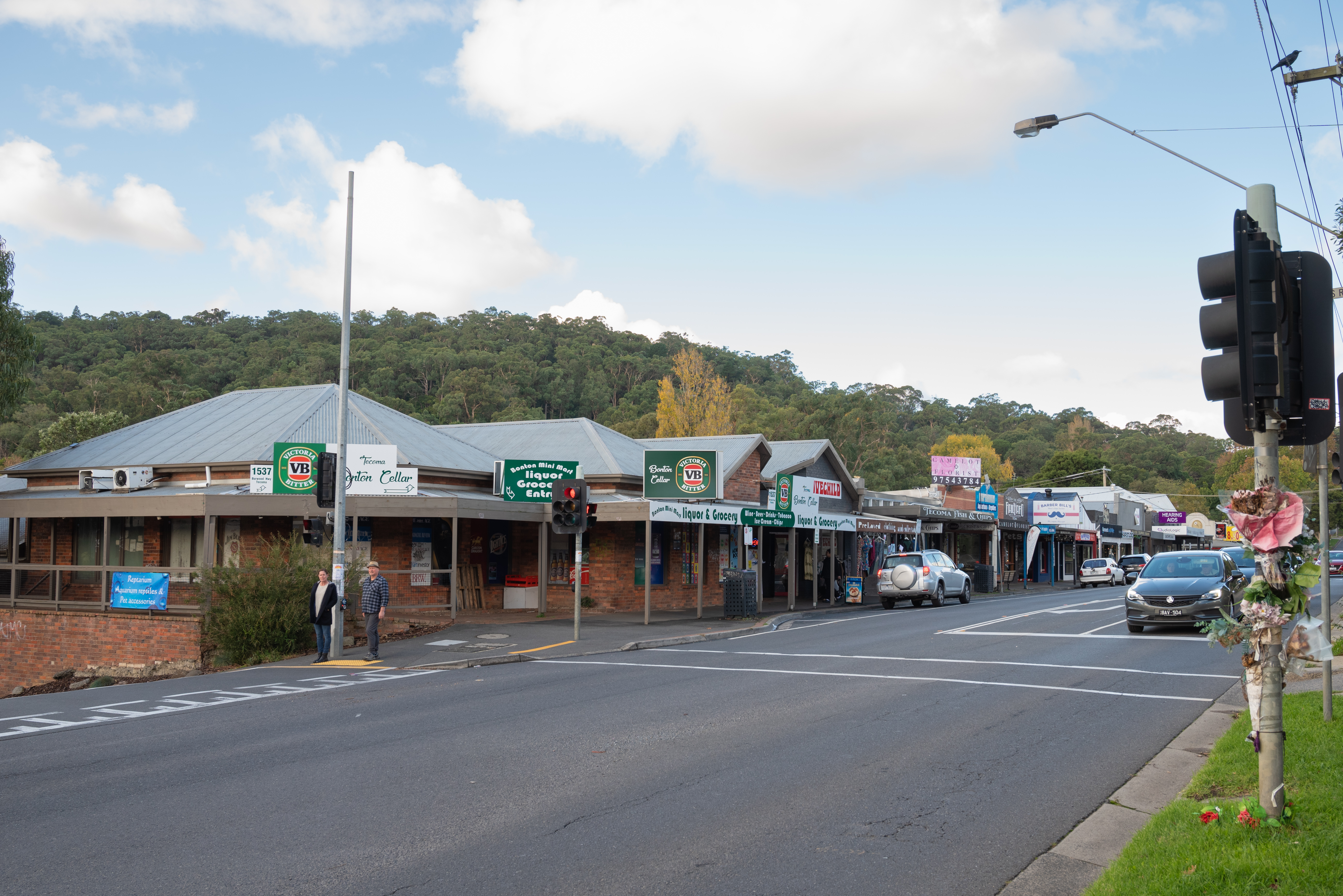
- Tecoma shops on Burwood Highway

- Interactive map of Tecoma
- Coordinates: 37.906°S 145.344°E
- Country: Australia
- State: Victoria
- City: Melbourne
- LGA: Shire of Yarra Ranges
- Location: 33 km (21 mi) from Melbourne; 2 km (1.2 mi) from Belgrave

Government
  - State electorate: Monbulk
  - Federal division: Casey

Area
  - Total: 1.8 km^{2} (0.69 sq mi)
- Elevation: 220 m (720 ft)

Population
  - Total: 2,064 (2021 census)
  - Density: 1,150/km^{2} (2,970/sq mi)
- Postcode: 3160
Suburbs around Tecoma
Ferny Creek	Ferny Creek	Sherbrooke
Upwey	Tecoma	Belgrave
Lysterfield	Belgrave Heights	Belgrave Heights

Tecoma (/təˈkoʊmə/ tə-KOH-mə) is a suburb in Melbourne, Victoria, Australia, 35 km east from Melbourne's central business district and 1 km west of Belgrave, located within the Shire of Yarra Ranges local government area. Tecoma recorded a population of 2,064 at the 2021 census.

The suburb is named after the shrub Tecoma that grew in the area when the need was identified for a railway station for the timber mill that occupied the site where Tecoma Primary School now stands. The Post Office opened on 7 January 1929, closing in 1976.

Tecoma is a small suburb, nestled between Belgrave and Upwey, adjoining Sherbrooke Forest to the north. It is historically recognised as a foothill township of the Dandenong Ranges, an area of cultural significance and biodiversity.

== Demographics ==
In the 2016 census the population of Tecoma was 2,082, 50.2% female and 49.8% male. The median age was 41.

79.4% of people living in Tecoma were born in Australia. The other top responses for country of birth were England 6.7%, New Zealand 1.5%, South Africa 0.9%, Netherlands 0.6% and United States of America 0.6%.

92.0% of people living in Tecoma only spoke English at home. The other top languages spoken at home were German 0.5%, Russian 0.5%, Dutch 0.3%, Italian 0.3% and Mandarin 0.3%.

== History ==
Until 1925 Tecoma did not have a separate name, only known as part of Upper Ferntree Gully, Upwey or as Lower Belgrave. The name arose when the residents of 'Lower Belgrave' persuaded the Victorian Railways to build a railway station there, which got named Tecoma after a plant which grew in the locality.

=== Heritage listing ===
The following place in Tacoma is listed on the Victorian Heritage Register:

- Horatio Jones house, 14–16 Blackwood Street

== McDonald's controversy ==
In 2011, a plan by the fast food chain McDonald's to build a 24-hour takeaway restaurant in the main street of Tecoma was met with strong community opposition. The original application for planning approval was rejected by Yarra Ranges Shire Council however McDonald's launched a successful appeal to the Victorian Civil and Administrative Tribunal and was granted planning approval in October 2012. Construction began in July 2013 and subsequent community opposition and protest led to widespread media attention. Protests and media attention peaked in the final months of construction leading to the April 2014 opening of the store and included Victoria Police action against the protesters during construction and a large police presence on the opening day of the store.

== Gallery ==
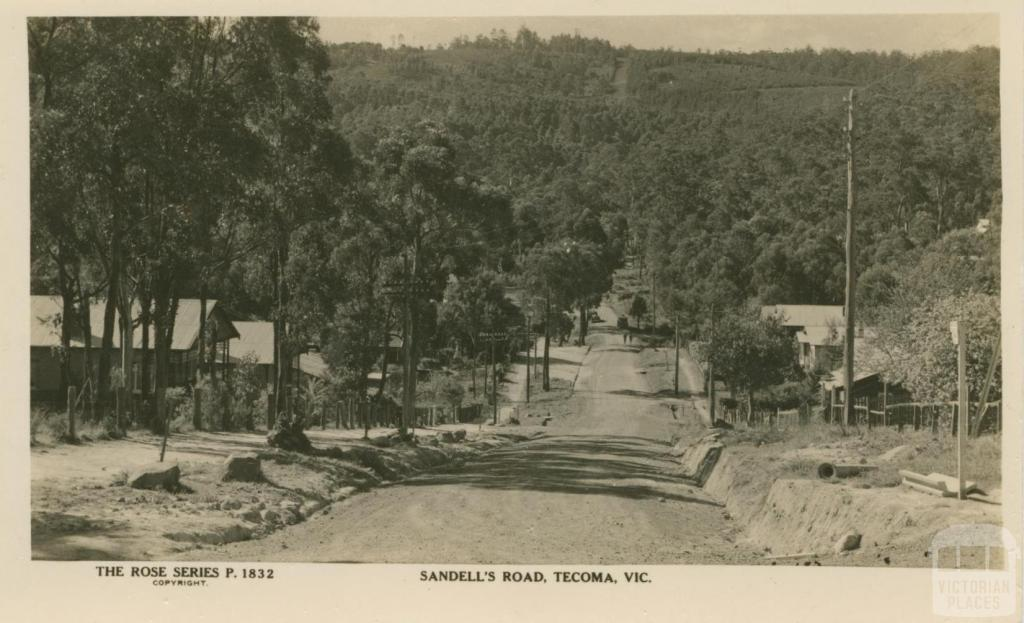
Olden Sandells Road

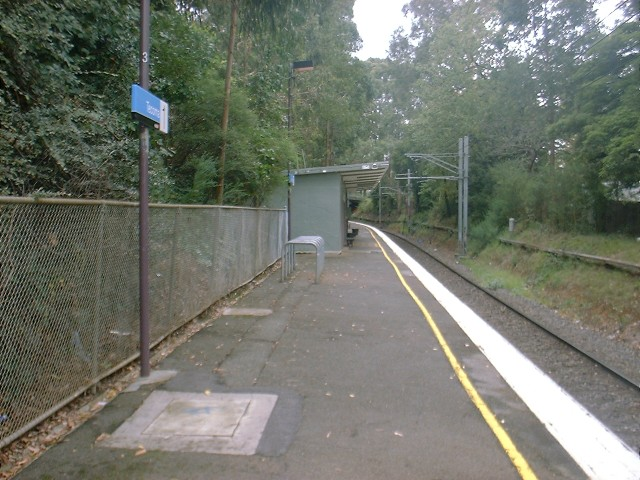
Tecoma railway station

== See also ==
- Tecoma railway station
