= Tecoma railway station =

Railway station in Melbourne, Australia

Tecoma
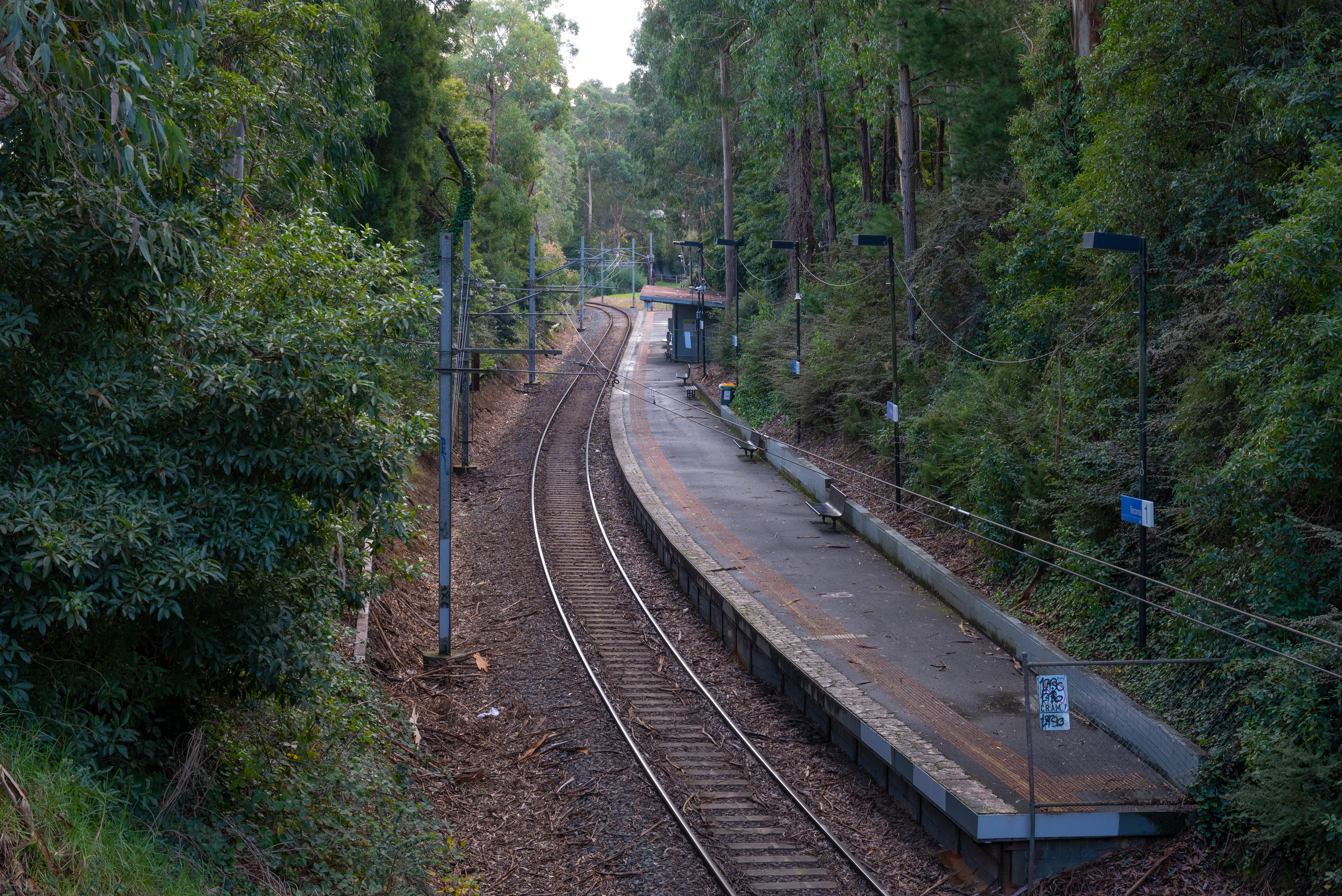
- Westbound view of station platform, May 2023

General information
- Location: Campbell Street, Tecoma, Victoria 3160; Shire of Yarra Ranges; Australia
- Coordinates: 37°54′29″S 145°20′35″E
- System: PTV commuter rail station
- Owner: VicTrack
- Operator: Metro Trains
- Lines: Belgrave; Gembrook (former)
- Distance: 41.34 kilometres from Southern Cross
- Platforms: 1
- Tracks: 1
- Connections: Bus

Construction
- Structure type: Ground
- Parking: Yes
- Cycle facilities: Yes
- Accessible: No—steep ramp

Other information
- Status: Operational, unstaffed
- Station code: TCM
- Fare zone: Myki zone 2
- Website: Public Transport Victoria

History
- Opened: 1 December 1924; 101 years ago
- Closed: 30 April 1954
- Rebuilt: 19 February 1962
- Electrified: February 1962 (1500 V DC overhead)

Passengers
- 2005–2006: 61,997
- 2006–2007: 62,414 ▲0.67%
- 2007–2008: 72,537 ▲16.21%
- 2008–2009: 77,524 ▲6.87%
- 2009–2010: 77,407 ▼0.15%
- 2010–2011: 76,761 ▼0.83%
- 2011–2012: 68,889 ▼10.25%
- 2012–2013: Not measured
- 2013–2014: 65,266 ▼5.25%
- 2014–2015: 66,836 ▲2.4%
- 2015–2016: 72,367 ▲8.27%
- 2016–2017: 57,422 ▼20.65%
- 2017–2018: 73,957 ▲28.79%
- 2018–2019: 75,657 ▲2.29%
- 2019–2020: 59,400 ▼21.48%
- 2020–2021: 30,300 ▼48.99%
- 2021–2022: 32,600 ▲7.59%
- 2022–2023: 43,850 ▲34.5%
- 2023–2024: 43,350 ▼1.14%
- 2024–2025: 47,250 ▲9%

Services
Preceding station	Metro Trains	Following station
Upwey towards Flinders Street	Belgrave line	Belgrave Terminus
Upwey towards Ringwood	Belgrave line Shuttle service	Belgrave Terminus
Former services
Preceding station	VicRail	Following station
Upwey towards Upper Ferntree Gully	Gembrook line	Belgrave towards Gembrook
List of closed railway stations in Melbourne
Track layout
Location

Tecoma station is a railway station operated by Metro Trains Melbourne on the Belgrave line, part of the Melbourne rail network. It serves the eastern Melbourne suburb of Tecoma in Victoria, Australia, and the platform surrounded by thick trees.

Tecoma is a ground level unstaffed station, featuring one side platform. It opened on 1 December 1924, with the current station provided in 1962. It initially closed on 30 April 1954, then reopened on 19 February 1962.

== History ==
Tecoma station opened on 1 December 1924, on the narrow-gauge Upper Ferntree Gully to Gembrook line, which was constructed as a means of transporting produce and passengers to and from the Dandenong Ranges area, and timber from sawmills in Gembrook. The station was named by the Victorian Railways, and was named after the plant Tecoma, which was grown in the area.

On 3 August 1953, a landslide occurred between Selby and Menzies Creek, which saw the closure of the line, and the station, on 30 April 1954. The sudden loss of the railway resulted in a groundswell of public pressure for the line to quickly reopen.

The formation of the Puffing Billy Preservation Society in 1955 saw services resume on the section of the line between Upper Ferntree Gully and Belgrave, including Tecoma. Operations continued until 23 February 1958, after which the line between Upper Ferntree Gully and Belgrave was converted to broad-gauge and electrified. On 19 February 1962, the station reopened.

The platform was used in a short cameo in the 2012 telemovie Underground: The Julian Assange Story.

The station has been the second-least-used station in metropolitan Melbourne since the 2015/2016 financial year, seeing 73,957 passenger movements in the twelve months between June 2018 and July 2019, equating to just over 200 passengers using the station each day on average.

== Platforms and services ==
Tecoma has one platform. It is served by Belgrave line trains.

Tecoma platform arrangement
Platform	Line	Destination	Via	Service Type	Notes	Source
1	Belgrave line	Ringwood, Flinders Street, Belgrave	City Loop	All stations and limited express services	See City Loop for operating patterns	

== Transport links ==
Ventura Bus Lines operates two routes via Tecoma station, under contract to Public Transport Victoria:

- 693 : Belgrave station – Oakleigh station
- 699 : Belgrave station – Upwey station

== Gallery ==
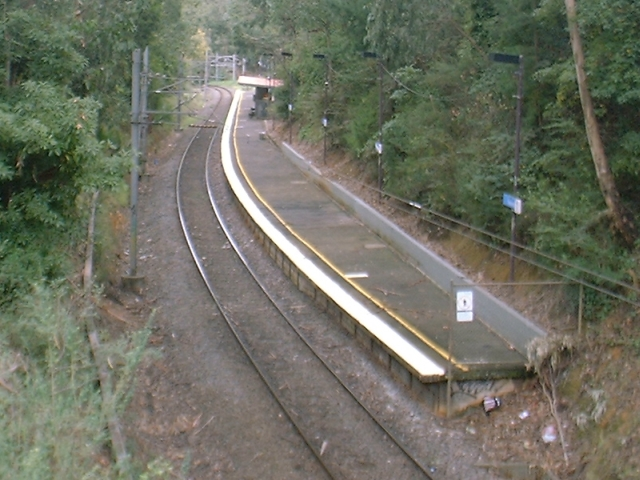
Westbound view of station platform, April 2006

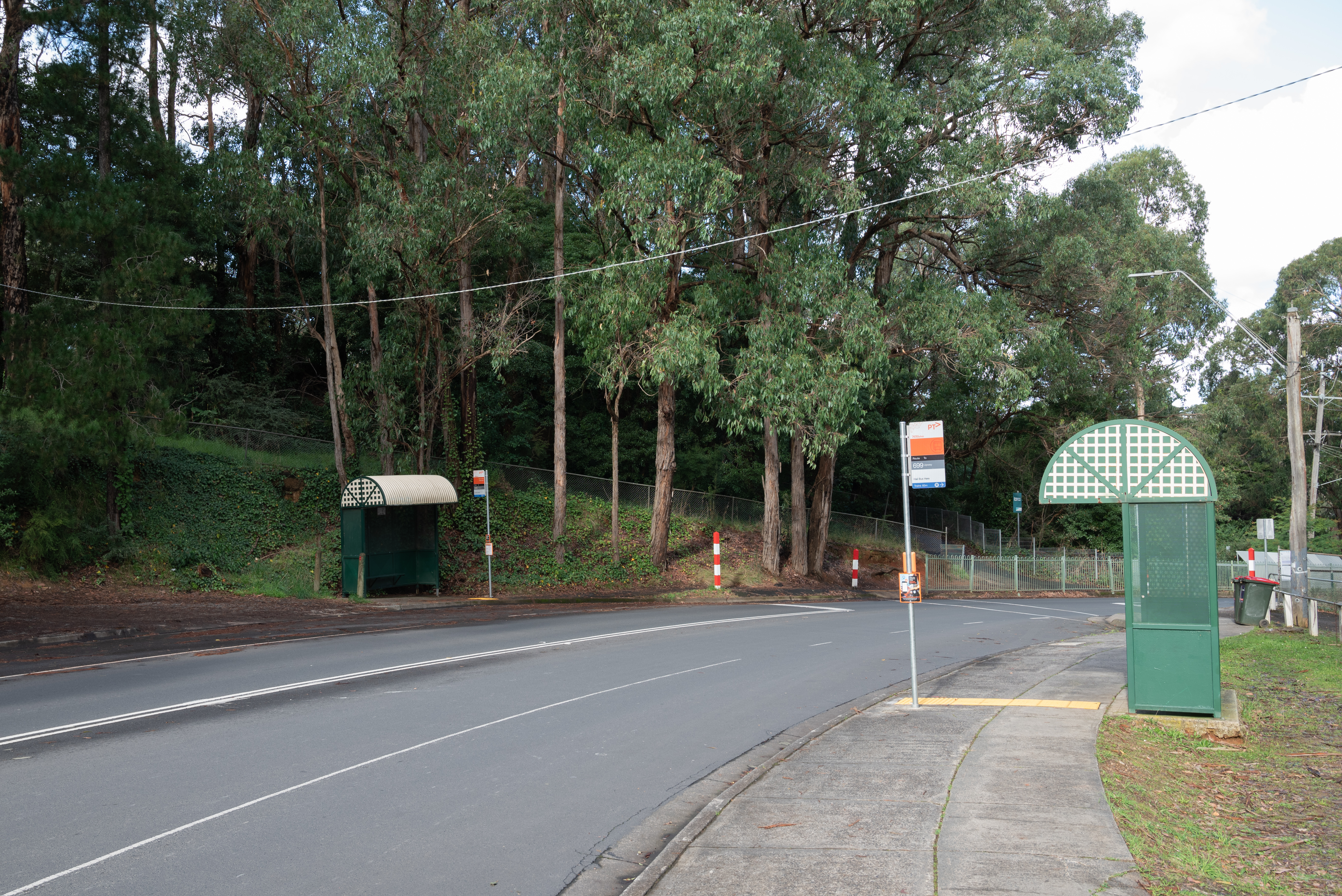
Bus stops on McNicol Road near Tecoma station, May 2023

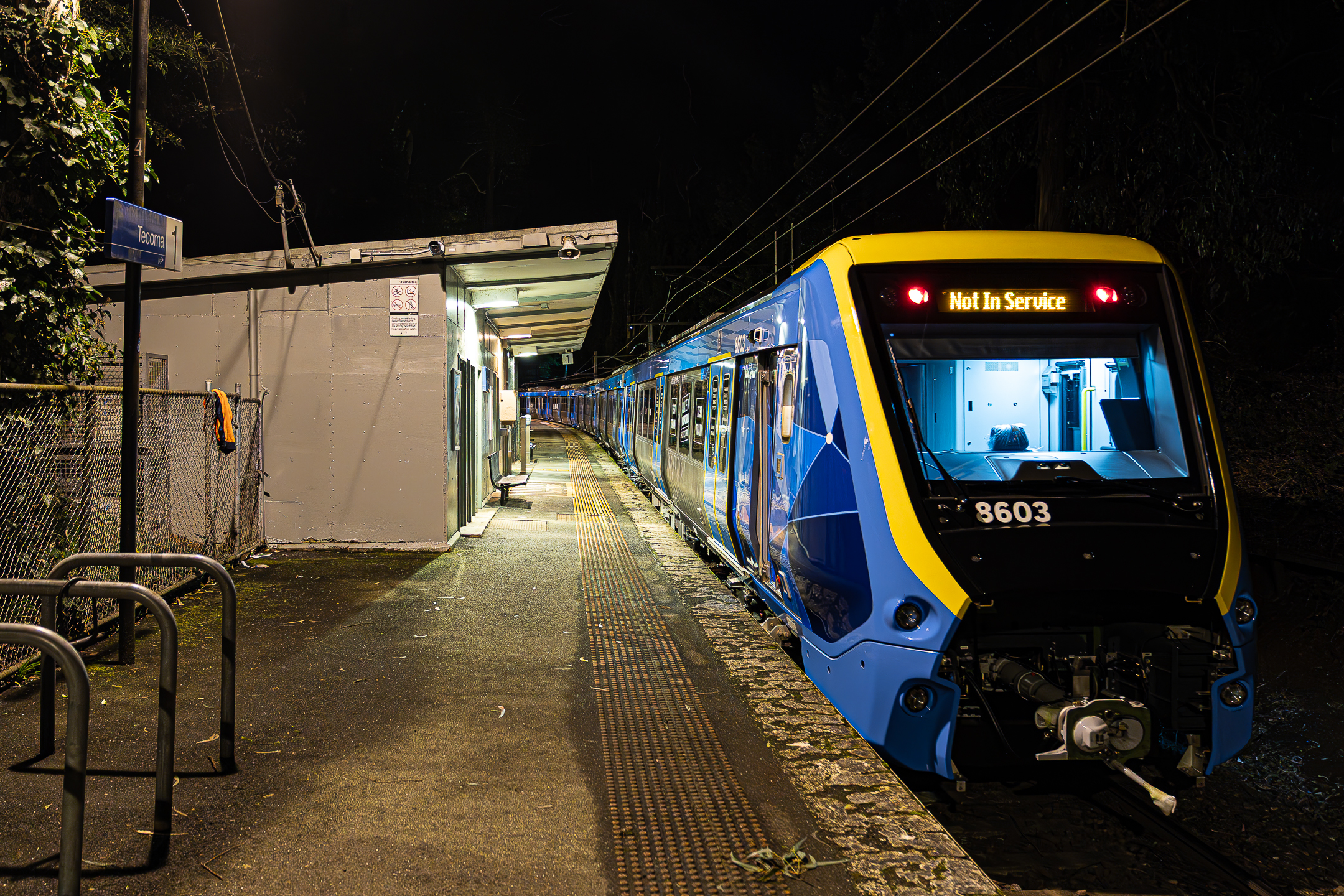
X'Trapolis 2.0 at Tecoma for gradient testing on the Belgrave Line.
