= Upwey railway station, Melbourne =

Railway station in Melbourne, Australia

Upwey
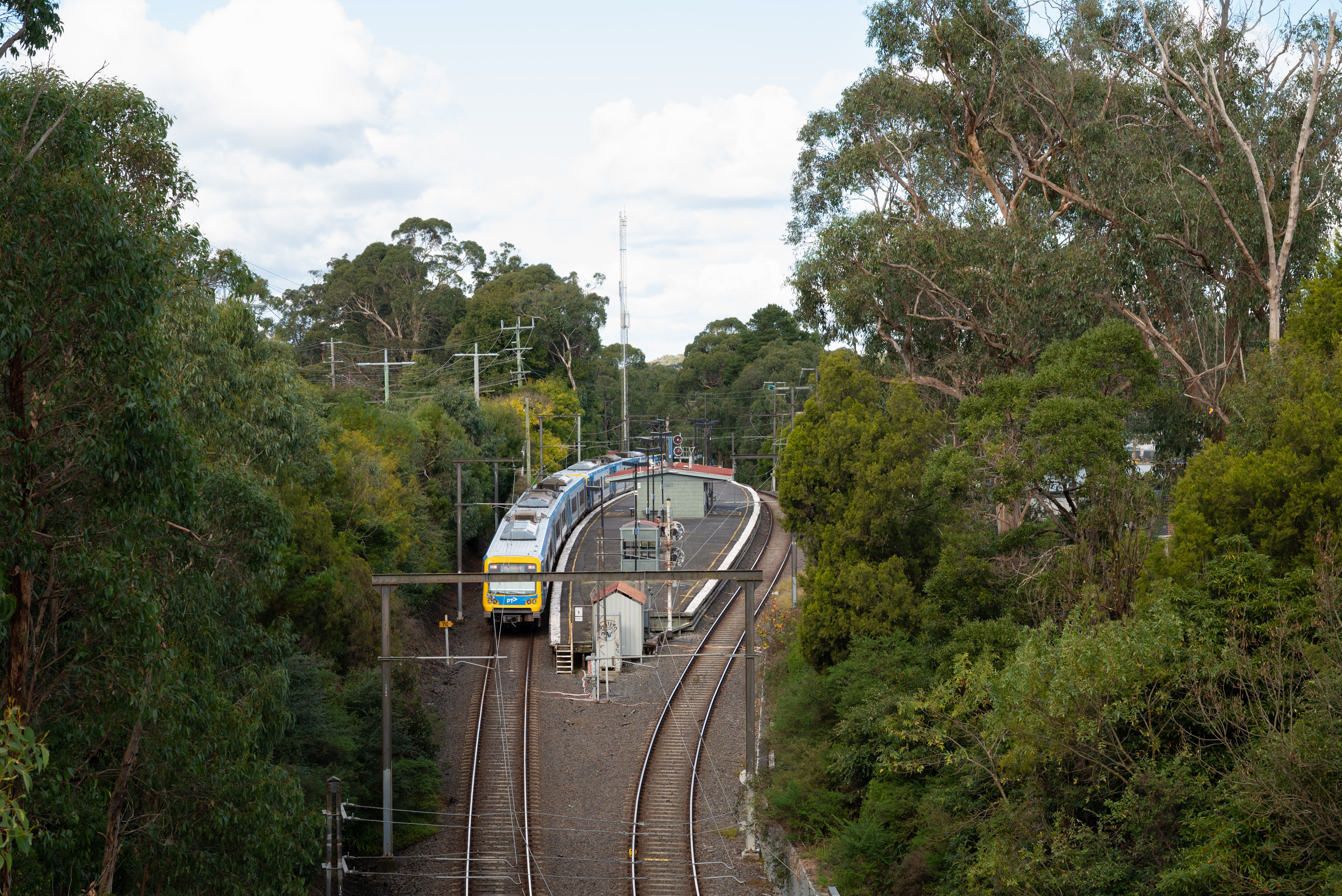
- Eastbound view, with the station in the distance viewed from Morris Road overpass, May 2023

General information
- Location: Burwood Highway, Upwey, Victoria 3158; Shire of Yarra Ranges; Australia
- Coordinates: 37°54′13″S 145°19′53″E
- System: PTV commuter rail station
- Owner: VicTrack
- Operator: Metro Trains
- Lines: Belgrave; Gembrook (former)
- Distance: 40.18 kilometres from Southern Cross
- Platforms: 2 (island)
- Tracks: 2
- Connections: Bus

Construction
- Structure type: Ground
- Cycle facilities: Yes
- Accessible: No—steep ramp

Other information
- Status: Operational, unstaffed
- Station code: UPW
- Fare zone: Myki zone 2
- Website: Public Transport Victoria

History
- Opened: 3 June 1901; 125 years ago
- Closed: 30 April 1954
- Rebuilt: 19 February 1962; 17 March 1964
- Electrified: February 1962 (1500 V DC overhead)

Passengers
- 2005–2006: 203,223
- 2006–2007: 222,159 ▲9.31%
- 2007–2008: 255,341 ▲14.93%
- 2008–2009: 259,952 ▲1.8%
- 2009–2010: 259,661 ▼0.11%
- 2010–2011: 266,529 ▲2.64%
- 2011–2012: 247,125 ▼7.28%
- 2012–2013: Not measured
- 2013–2014: 147,716 ▼40.22%
- 2014–2015: 148,798 ▲0.73%
- 2015–2016: 156,543 ▲5.2%
- 2016–2017: 125,715 ▼19.69%
- 2017–2018: 158,903 ▲26.39%
- 2018–2019: 157,055 ▼1.16%
- 2019–2020: 120,700 ▼23.14%
- 2020–2021: 61,700 ▼48.88%
- 2021–2022: 69,600 ▲12.8%
- 2022–2023: 90,150 ▲29.52%
- 2023–2024: 92,050 ▲2.11%
- 2024–2025: 97,850 ▲6.3%

Services
Preceding station	Metro Trains	Following station
Upper Ferntree Gully towards Flinders Street	Belgrave line	Tecoma towards Belgrave
Upper Ferntree Gully towards Ringwood	Belgrave line Shuttle service	Tecoma towards Belgrave
Former services
Preceding station	VicRail	Following station
Upper Ferntree Gully Terminus	Gembrook line	Tecoma towards Gembrook
List of closed railway stations in Melbourne
Track layout
Location

Upwey station is a railway station operated by Metro Trains Melbourne on the Belgrave line, part of the Melbourne rail network. It serves the eastern Melbourne suburb of Upwey in Victoria, Australia. Upwey is a ground level unstaffed station, featuring an island platform with two faces. It opened on 3 June 1901, with the current station provided in 1964. It initially closed on 30 April 1954, then reopened on 19 February 1962.

The station is a crossing loop in the middle of a six-kilometre section of single track between Ferntree Gully and Belgrave.

== History ==
Upwey station opened on 3 June 1901 and, like the suburb itself, was named after the homestead Upwey, which was named by a local family who purchased the property in 1897. The name itself comes from Upwey in Dorset, England, which is located on the River Wey.

Upwey was originally on the Upper Ferntree Gully – Gembrook narrow-gauge line. On 30 April 1954, the station, along with the rest of the line, was closed to traffic. On 19 February 1962, Upwey reopened, when the line as far as Belgrave was converted to broad gauge and electrified. On 17 March 1964, the current island platform was provided, when the present day Platform 2 was brought into use.

The 2010/2011 state budget allocated $83.7 million to upgrade Upwey to a premium station, but plans were cancelled by the Baillieu Government in 2011.

== Platforms and services ==
Upwey has one island platform with two faces. It is served by Belgrave line trains.

Upwey platform arrangement
Platform	Line	Destination	Via	Service Type	Notes	Source
1	Belgrave line	Ringwood, Flinders Street	City Loop	All stations and limited express services	See City Loop for operating patterns	
2	Belgrave line	Belgrave		All stations		

== Transport links ==
Ventura Bus Lines operates two routes via Upwey station, under contract to Public Transport Victoria:

- 693 : Belgrave station – Oakleigh station
- 699 : to Belgrave station

== Gallery ==
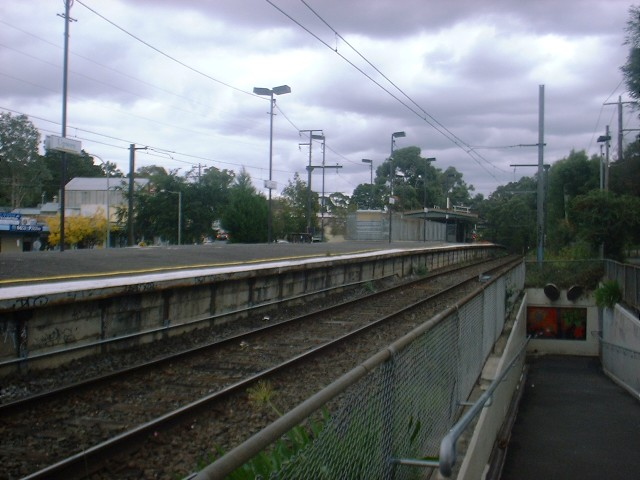
Westbound view of Platform 2 from station concourse, April 2006

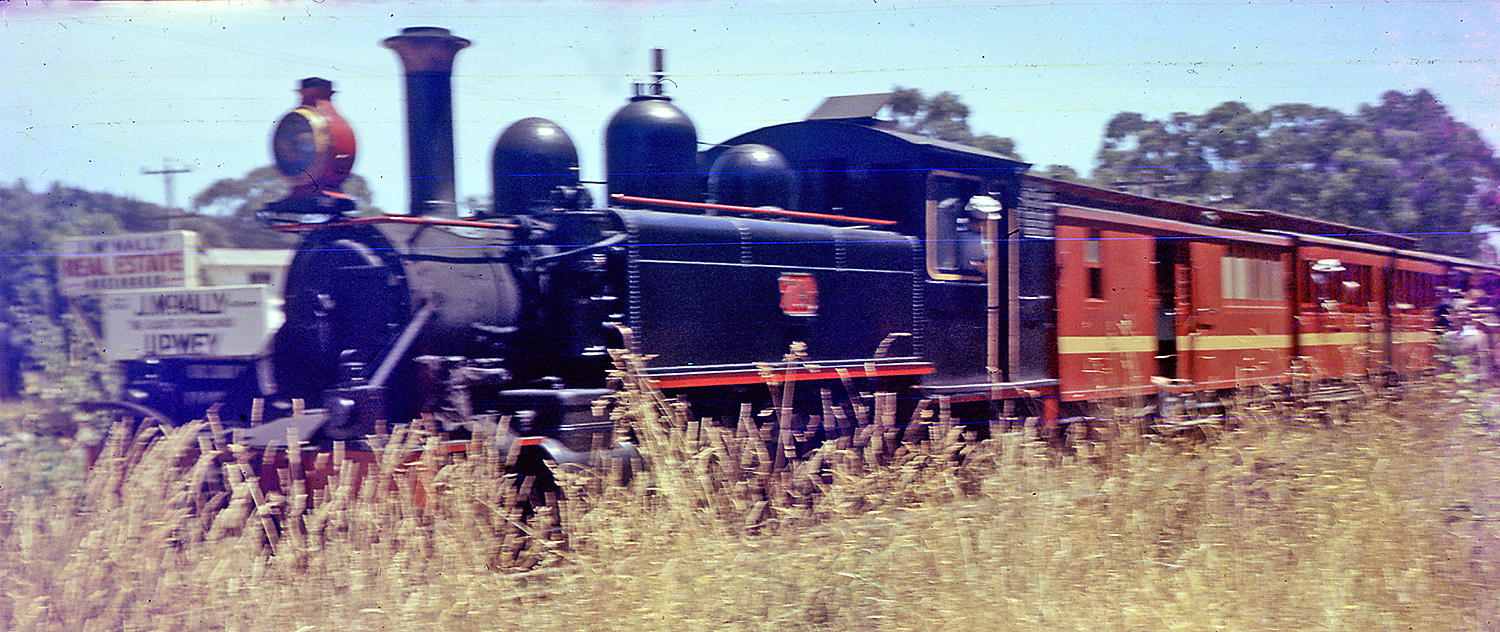
Puffing Billy Railway locomotive 7A at Upwey station (Frank Stamford).
