= Ormond railway station =

Railway station in Melbourne, Australia

Ormond
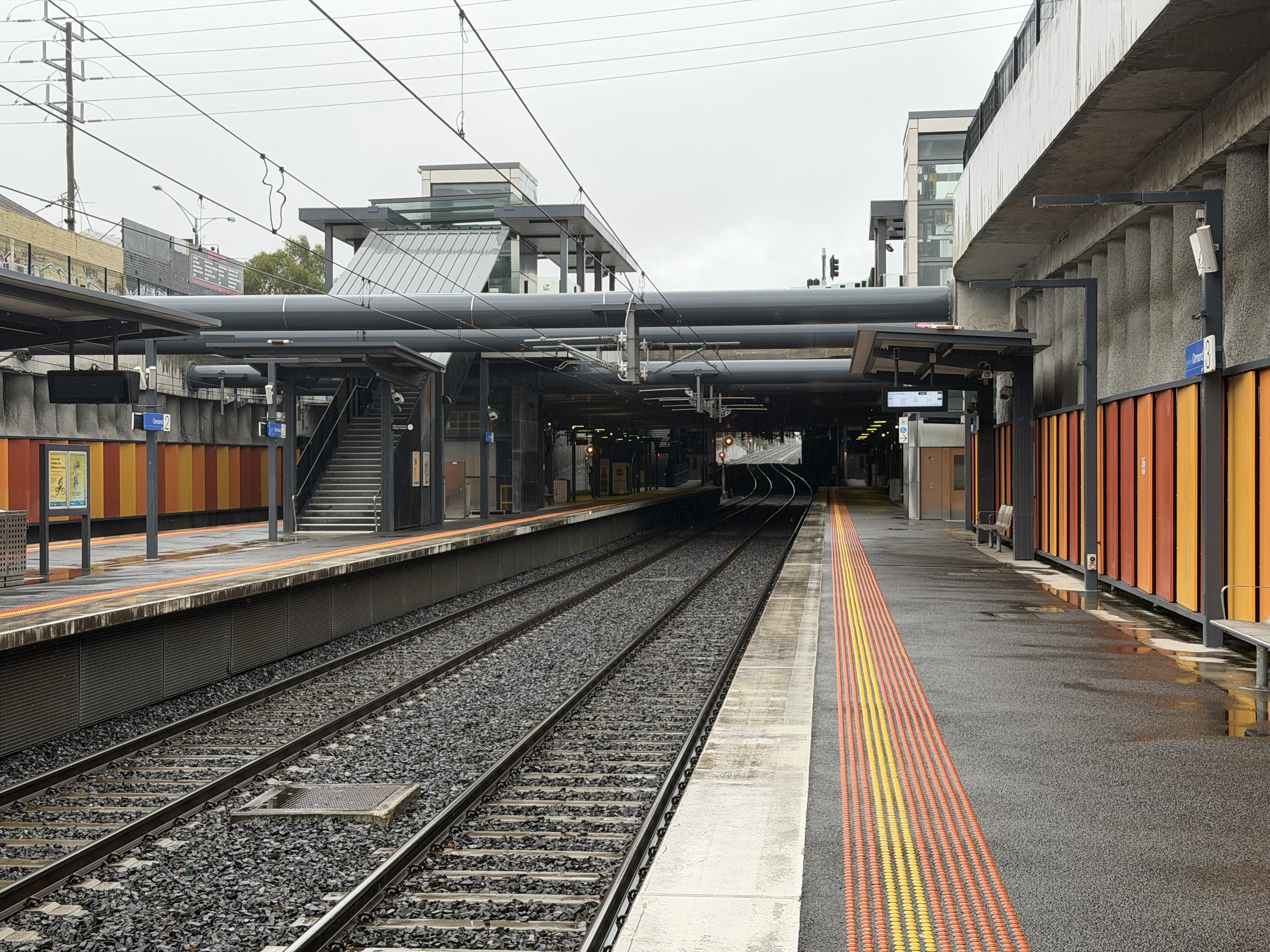
- Northbound view from Platform 3, April 2026

General information
- Location: Newham Grove, Ormond, Victoria 3204; City of Glen Eira; Australia
- Coordinates: 37°54′12″S 145°02′22″E
- System: PTV commuter rail station
- Owner: VicTrack
- Operator: Metro Trains
- Line: Frankston
- Distance: 14.90 kilometres from Southern Cross
- Platforms: 3 (1 side, 1 island)
- Tracks: 3
- Connections: Bus

Construction
- Structure type: Below ground
- Parking: 153
- Cycle facilities: Yes
- Accessible: Yes—step free access

Other information
- Status: Operational, host station
- Station code: OMD
- Fare zone: Myki zone 1/2
- Website: Public Transport Victoria

History
- Opened: 19 December 1881; 144 years ago
- Rebuilt: November–December 1974; 28 June 1987; 29 August 2016 (LXRP)
- Electrified: June 1922 (1500 V DC overhead)
- Former names: North Road (1881-1897)

Passengers
- 2005–2006: 654,307
- 2006–2007: 714,822 ▲9.24%
- 2007–2008: 770,937 ▲7.85%
- 2008–2009: 823,896 ▲6.86%
- 2009–2010: 871,154 ▲5.73%
- 2010–2011: 869,491 ▼0.19%
- 2011–2012: 803,239 ▼7.61%
- 2012–2013: Not measured
- 2013–2014: 806,196 ▲0.36%
- 2014–2015: 769,628 ▼4.53%
- 2015–2016: 522,700 ▼32.08%
- 2016–2017: 643,323 ▲23.07%
- 2017–2018: 824,199 ▲28.11%
- 2018–2019: 766,372 ▼7.01%
- 2019–2020: 528,350 ▼31.05%
- 2020–2021: 265,150 ▼49.81%
- 2021–2022: 288,800 ▲8.91%

Services
Preceding station	Metro Trains	Following station
Glen Huntly towards Flinders Street via City Loop	Frankston line	McKinnon towards Frankston
Track layout
Location

Ormond station is a railway station operated by Metro Trains Melbourne on the Frankston line, part of the Melbourne rail network. It serves the south-eastern suburb of Ormond, in Melbourne, Victoria, Australia. Ormond station is a below ground host station, featuring three platforms, an island platform with two faces and one side platform. It opened on 19 December 1881, with the current station provided in August 2016.

Initially opened as North Road, the station was given its current name of Ormond on 1 September 1897.

== History ==
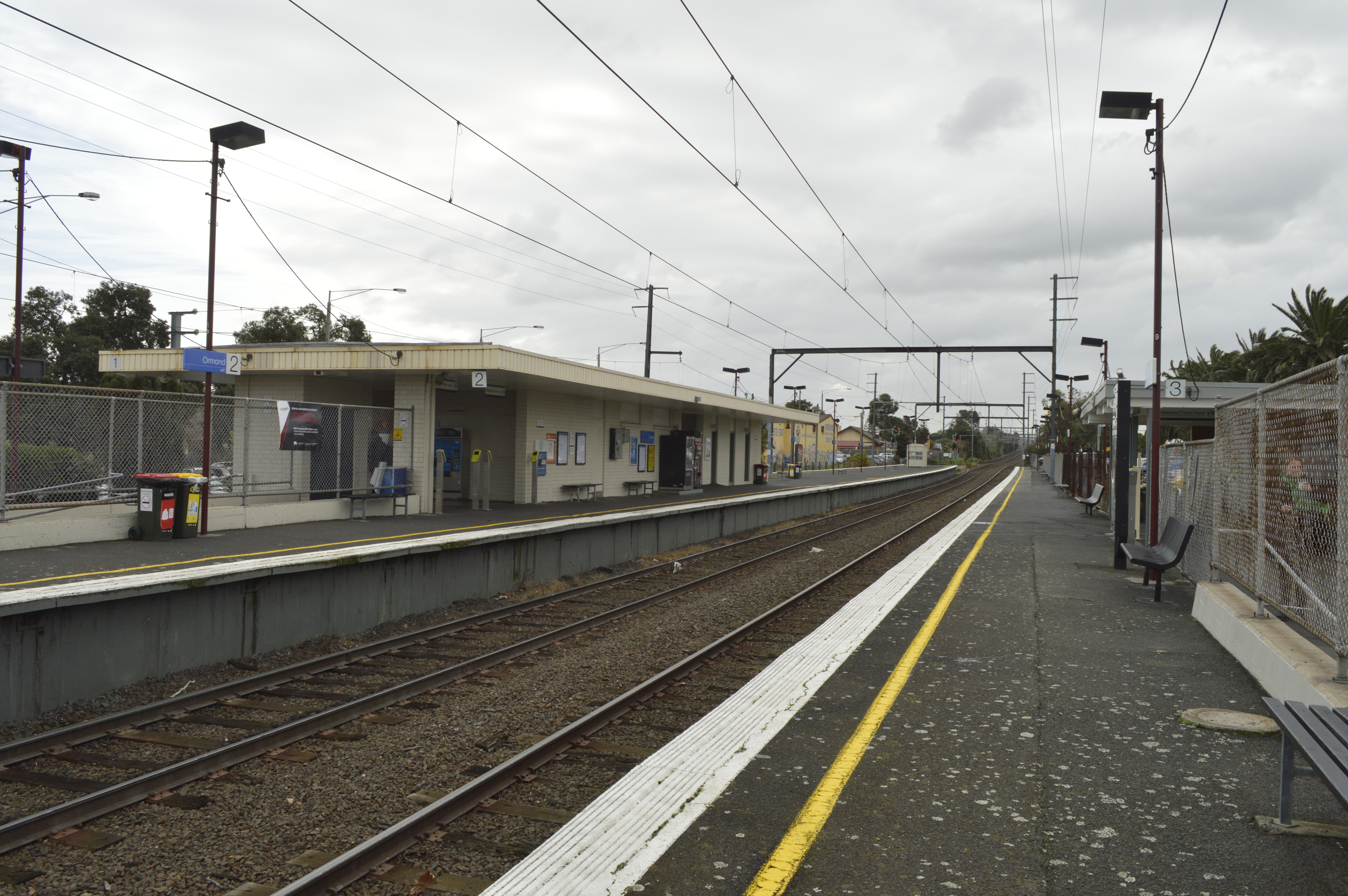
Former ground level platforms at Ormond station in June 2014, prior to the 2016 rebuild

Ormond station opened on 19 December 1881, when the railway line from Caulfield was extended to Mordialloc. Like the suburb itself, the station was named after Francis Ormond, a grazier and philanthropist in religion and education. Ormond was later elected to the Parliament of Victoria in 1882 as a member of the Legislative Council.

In 1922, the station was closed to goods traffic. A siding at the station was removed in that same year.

In 1968, boom barriers replaced interlocked gates at the former North Road level crossing, which was located at the down end of the station. In 1974, all interlocking at the station was abolished. Also in that year, an island platform and a side platform for services operating in the down direction was provided.

On 28 June 1987, the up face of the former surface-level island platform was brought into use.

On 4 May 2010, as part of the 2010/2011 State Budget, $83.7 million was allocated to upgrade Ormond to a premium station, along with nineteen others. However, in March 2011, this was scrapped by the Baillieu Government.

In May 2014, the Victorian Government announced a grade separation project to remove the North Road level crossing, requiring the station to be rebuilt. On 25 March 2016, the station temporarily closed, to allow its demolition and rebuilding below ground level. On 29 August of that year, the rebuilt station opened.

== Platforms and services ==
Ormond has one island platform with two faces and one side platform. Until 2023, in the morning peak-hour, Frankston-bound services used Platform 3, with Flinders Street-bound services using Platforms 1 and 2. At other times, Frankston-bound services used Platform 2.

Following the re-construction of Glen Huntly station in July 2023, Frankston-bound services use Platform 3, while Platform 2 is not regularly used and non-stopping express trains pass the platform in the peak hour.

It is serviced by Metro Trains' Frankston line services.

Ormond platform arrangement
Platform	Line	Destination	Via	Service Type	Notes	Source
1	Frankston line	Flinders Street	City Loop	All stations and limited express services		
2	Frankston line				Services may occasionally stop at this platform. Peak hour services run express through this station.	
3	Frankston line	Frankston, Mordialloc, Cheltenham or Carrum		All stations		

== Transport links ==
CDC Melbourne operates two bus routes via Ormond station, under contract to Public Transport Victoria:

- 625 : Elsternwick – Chadstone Shopping Centre
- 630 : Elwood – Monash University Clayton Campus
