= Bentleigh railway station =

Railway station in Melbourne, Australia

Bentleigh
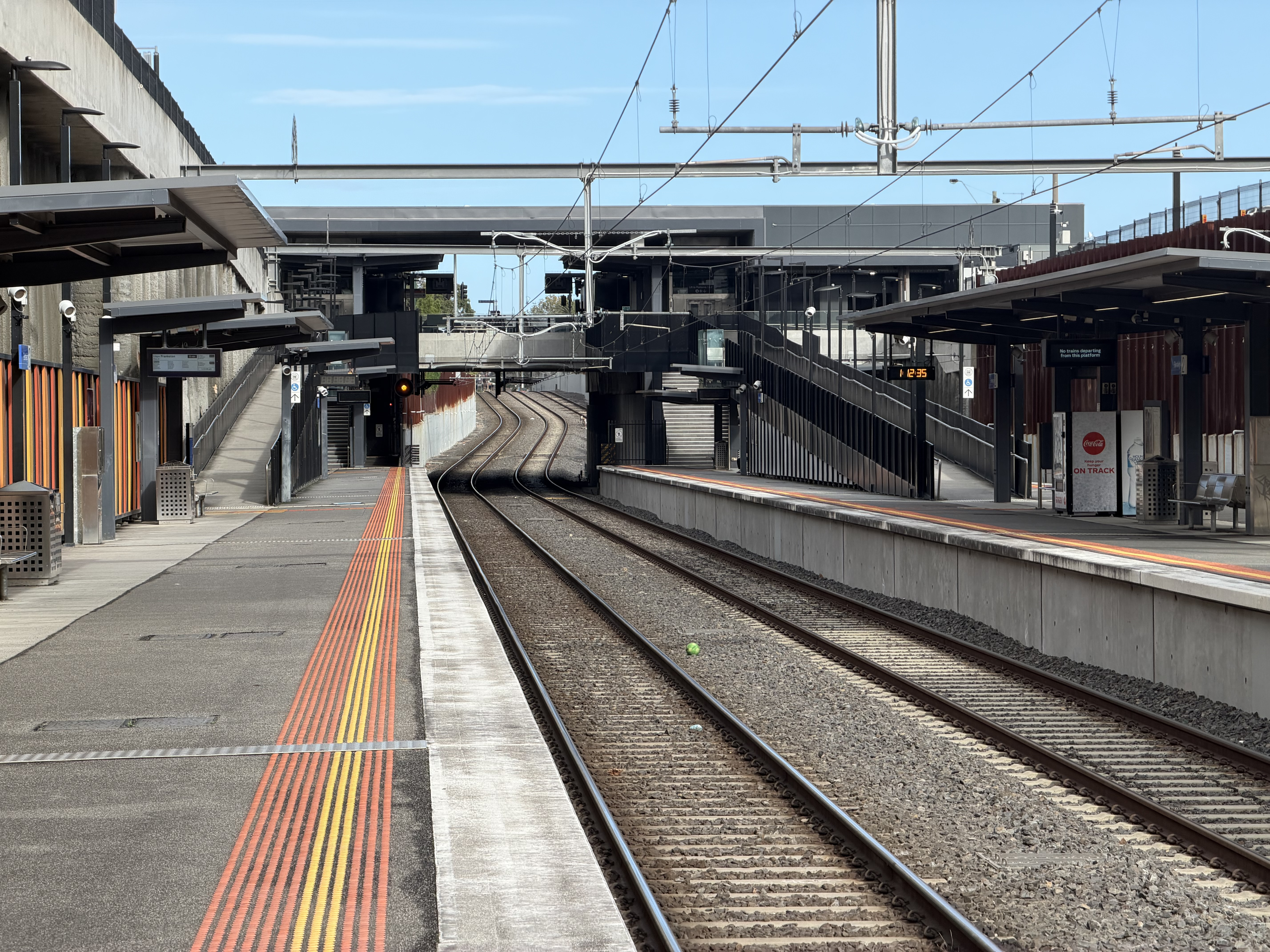
- Southbound view from Platform 3, June 2026

General information
- Location: Nicholson Street, Bentleigh, Victoria 3204; City of Glen Eira; Australia
- Coordinates: 37°55′03″S 145°02′13″E
- System: PTV commuter rail station
- Owner: VicTrack
- Operator: Metro Trains
- Line: Frankston
- Distance: 16.52 kilometres from Southern Cross
- Platforms: 3 (1 side, 1 island)
- Tracks: 3
- Connections: Bus

Construction
- Structure type: Below ground
- Parking: 109
- Cycle facilities: Yes
- Accessible: Yes—step free access

Other information
- Status: Operational, premium station
- Station code: BEN
- Fare zone: Myki zone 1/2
- Website: Public Transport Victoria

History
- Opened: 19 December 1881; 144 years ago
- Rebuilt: 29 August 2016 (LXRP)
- Electrified: June 1922 (1500 V DC overhead)
- Former names: East Brighton (1881-1907)

Passengers
- 2005-2006: 756,552
- 2006-2007: 818,722 ▲8.21%
- 2007-2008: 854,967 ▲4.42%
- 2008-2009: 990,000 ▲15.79%
- 2009-2010: 1,029,000 ▲3.94%
- 2010-2011: 1,006,000 ▼2.23%
- 2011-2012: 898,000 ▼10.74%
- 2012-2013: Not measured
- 2013-2014: 785,000 ▼12.58%
- 2014-2015: 737,989 ▼5.98%
- 2015-2016: 612,593 ▼16.99%
- 2016-2017: 559,528 ▼8.66%
- 2017-2018: 766,858 ▲37.05%
- 2018-2019: 727,900 ▼5.04%
- 2019-2020: 515,100 ▼29.23%
- 2020-2021: 299,650 ▼41.8%
- 2021–2022: 344,350 ▲14.91%
- 2022–2023: 415,200 ▲20.58%
- 2023–2024: 509,100 ▲22.62%
- 2024–2025: 586,000 ▲15.12%

Services
| Preceding station | Metro Trains | Following station |
|---|---|---|
| McKinnon towards Flinders Street via City Loop | Frankston line | Patterson towards Frankston |
Track layout
Location

Bentleigh station is a railway station operated by Metro Trains Melbourne on the Frankston line, part of the Melbourne rail network. It serves the south-eastern suburb of Bentleigh, in Melbourne, Victoria, Australia. Bentleigh station is a below ground premium station, featuring three platforms, an island platform with two faces and one side platform. It opened on 19 December 1881, with the current station provided in August 2016.

Initially opened as East Brighton, the station was given its current name of Bentleigh on 1 May 1907.

== History ==
Bentleigh station opened on 19 December 1881, when the railway line from Caulfield was extended to Mordialloc. Like the suburb itself, the station was named after Thomas Bent, former Premier of Victoria between 1904 and 1909.

A goods siding once existed at the station. It closed in 1922, and the connections to the siding were removed in that same year. In 1944, a crossover at the down end of the station was abolished.

In 1974, boom barriers replaced interlocked gates at the former Centre Road level crossing, which was located at the down end of the station.

On 28 June 1987, the up face of the former ground level island platform was brought into use. The former pedestrian underpass was also provided during this time.

In 1998, Bentleigh was upgraded to a premium station. Prior to the works, Bentleigh closely resembled McKinnon. Also around this time, the underpass was filled in.

In 2006, the station's former pedestrian level crossing was upgraded as part of a VicTrack trial of new crossing technology. Additional warning devices were also fitted, with the common red pedestrian sign, as well as an LED light box saying "Another Train Coming", which is lit when either an express train is approaching on the southbound line, or when a train is approaching after another train on the northbound line.

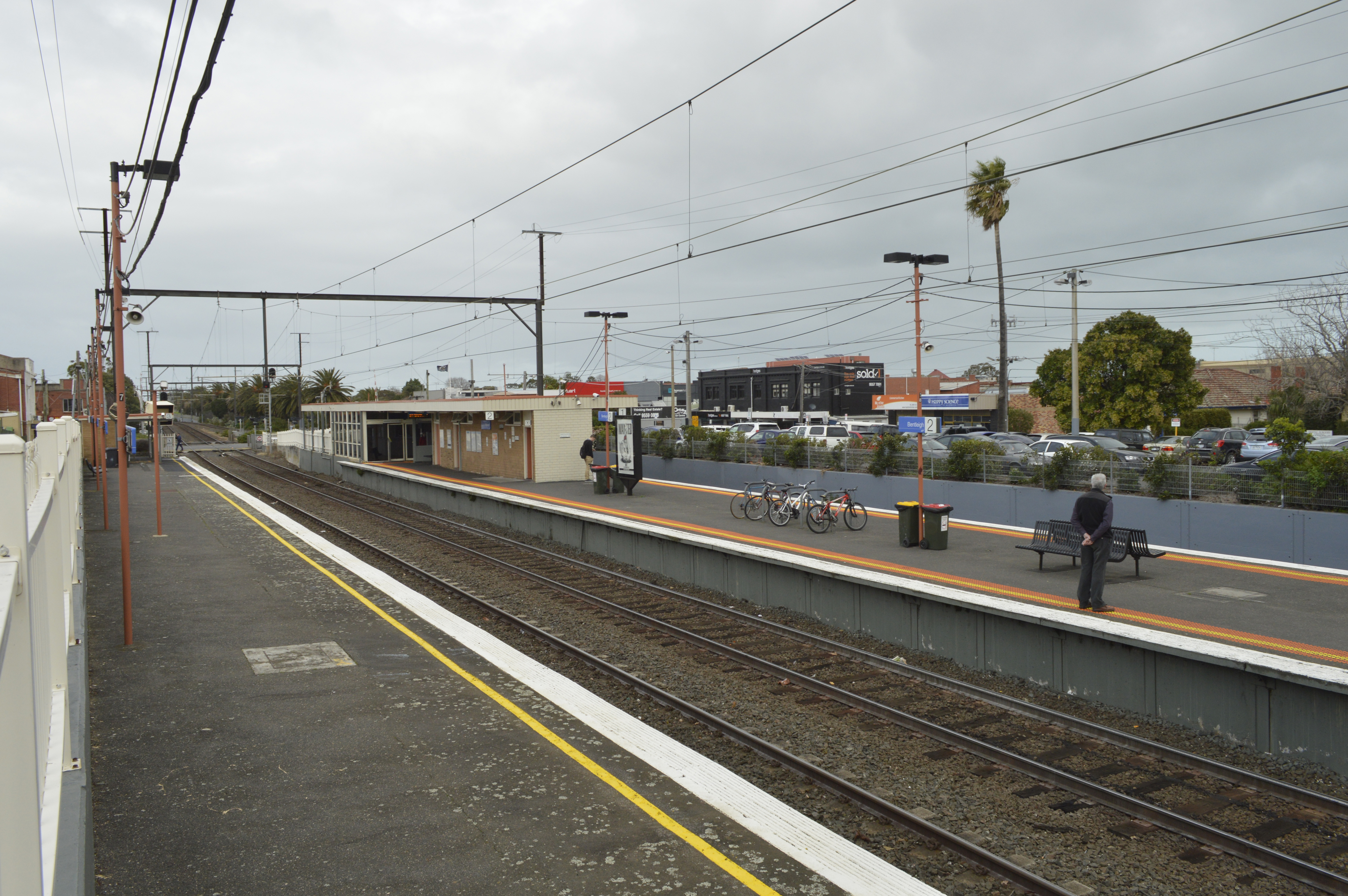
The station prior to its 2016 rebuild.

In 2016, the Level Crossing Removal Authority rebuilt the station and grade separated the Centre Road level crossing, immediately south of the station. The station closed for demolition on 4 June 2016, and the rebuilt station opened on 29 August of that year.

Bentleigh was one of the stations set to receive funding through the Morrison government's controversial Commuter Car Park Scheme, where funding was allocated to stations without consultation with local councils, and which the Auditor-General labelled "pork-barrelling". As of 2021, City of Glen Eira was starting community consultation over the proposal, with concerns that the funding was "tainted".

== Platforms and services ==
Bentleigh has one island platform with two faces, and one side platform. It is serviced by Metro Trains' Frankston line services.

Bentleigh platform arrangement
| Platform | Line | Destination | Via | Service Type | Notes | Source |
|---|---|---|---|---|---|---|
| 1 | Frankston line | Flinders Street | City Loop | All stations and limited express services | | |
| 2 | Frankston line | | | | Services may occasionally stop at this platform. Peak hour services run express through this station. | |
| 3 | Frankston line | Frankston, Cheltenham, Mordialloc or Carrum | | All stations | | |

== Transport links ==
Ventura Bus Lines operates two routes via Bentleigh station, under contract to Public Transport Victoria:

- 701 : to Oakleigh station
- SmartBus 703 : Middle Brighton station – Blackburn station
