= Alf Sharp =

Australian rules footballer

Personal information
- Full name: Alfred Sharp
- Born: 3 February 1881; Carlton, Victoria
- Died: 1 September 1966 (aged 85); McKinnon, Victoria
- Original team: Fitzroy Juniors
- Height: 183 cm (6 ft 0 in)
- Weight: 81 kg (179 lb)

Playing career^{1}
Years	Club	Games (Goals)
1903–1904	Fitzroy	19 (0)
1905	Carlton	5 (0)
Total		24 (0)
- ^{1} Playing statistics correct to the end of 1905.

Career highlights
- VFL premiership player: 1904

Alfred Sharp (3 February 1881 – 1 September 1966) was an Australian rules footballer who played for the Fitzroy Football Club and Carlton Football Club in the Victorian Football League (VFL).

When Sharp appeared for Fitzroy in the 1903 VFL Grand Final it was just his fifth league game and would also be the first loss of his career. He was a back pocket defender in Fitzroy's premiership winning team the following season.

He isn't known to have been related to premiership teammate Jim Sharp but did have a son, Mickey Sharp, who played for the club in the 1930s and early 1940s.
