= McKinnon railway station =

Railway station in Melbourne, Australia

McKinnon
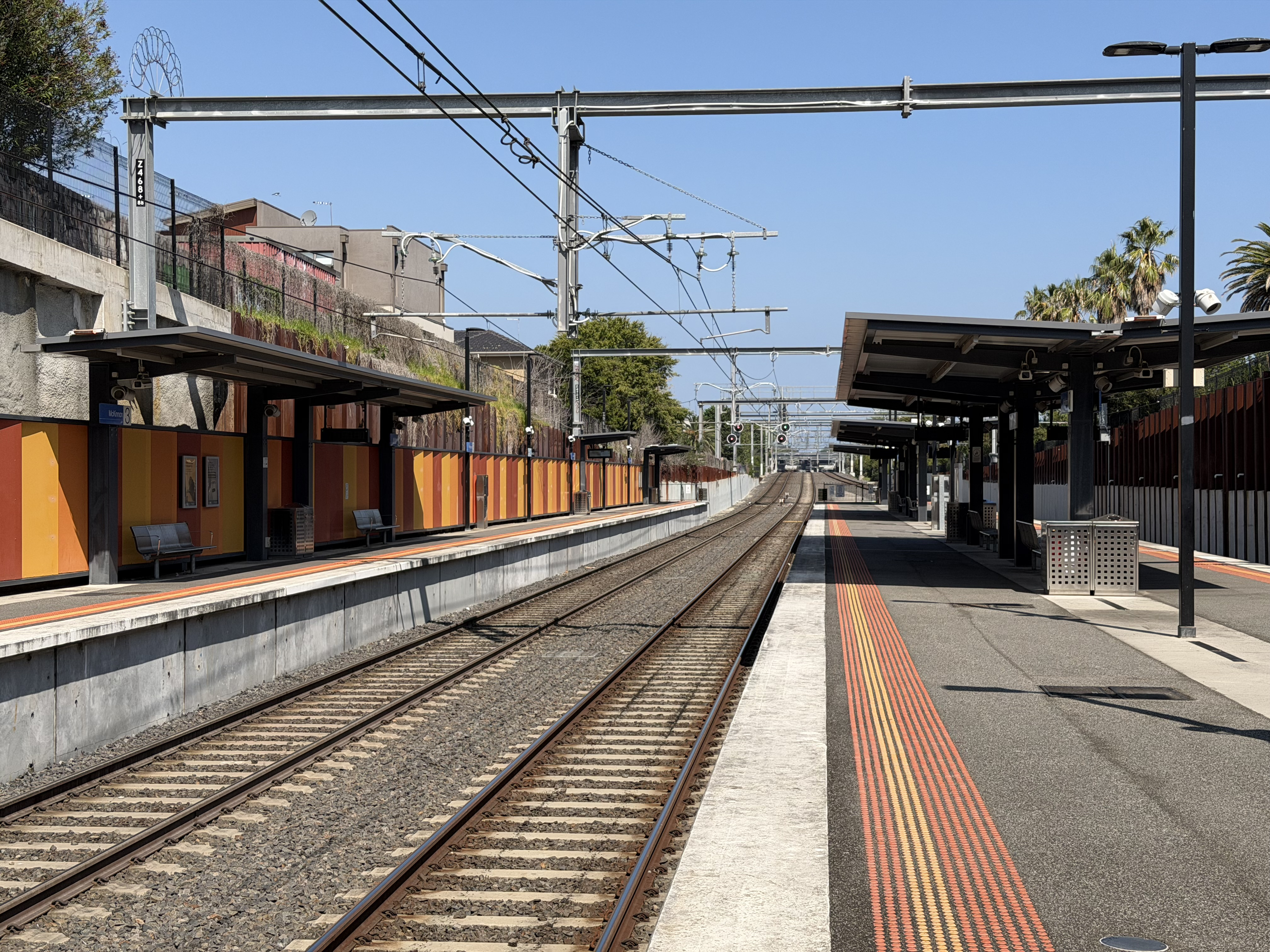
- Southbound view from Platform 2, March 2026

General information
- Location: Station Avenue, McKinnon, Victoria 3204; City of Glen Eira; Australia
- Coordinates: 37°54′37″S 145°02′18″E
- System: PTV commuter rail station
- Owner: VicTrack
- Operator: Metro Trains
- Line: Frankston
- Distance: 15.72 kilometres from Southern Cross
- Platforms: 3 (1 side, 1 island)
- Tracks: 3
- Connections: Bus

Construction
- Structure type: Below ground
- Parking: 103
- Cycle facilities: Yes
- Accessible: Yes—step free access

Other information
- Status: Operational, unstaffed
- Station code: MCK
- Fare zone: Myki zone 1/2
- Website: Public Transport Victoria

History
- Opened: 1 September 1884; 142 years ago
- Rebuilt: 1976; 28 June 1987; 1 August 2016 (LXRP)
- Electrified: 1500 V DC overhead (June 1922)
- Former names: McKinnon Road (1884-1885)

Passengers
- 2005-2006: 356,148
- 2006-2007: 385,714 ▲8.3%
- 2007-2008: 423,365 ▲9.76%
- 2008-2009: 452,000 ▲6.76%
- 2009-2010: 464,000 ▲2.65%
- 2010-2011: 462,000 ▼0.43%
- 2011-2012: 428,000 ▼7.36%
- 2012-2013: Not measured
- 2013-2014: 457,000 ▲6.78%
- 2014-2015: 448,084 ▼1.95%
- 2015-2016: 314,203 ▼29.87%
- 2016-2017: 404,492 ▲28.74%
- 2017-2018: 485,711 ▲20.08%
- 2018-2019: 450,450 ▼7.26%
- 2019-2020: 324,500 ▼27.96%
- 2020-2021: 173,200 ▼46.7%
- 2021–2022: 196,050 ▲13.19%

Services
Preceding station	Metro Trains	Following station
Ormond towards Flinders Street via City Loop	Frankston line	Bentleigh towards Frankston
Track layout
Location

McKinnon station is a railway station operated by Metro Trains Melbourne on the Frankston line, part of the Melbourne rail network. It serves the south-eastern suburb of McKinnon, in Melbourne, Victoria, Australia. McKinnon station is a below ground unstaffed station, featuring three platforms, an island platform with two faces and one side platform. It opened on 1 September 1884, with the current station provided in August 2016.

Initially opened as McKinnon Road, the station was given its current name of McKinnon on 14 December 1885.

== History ==
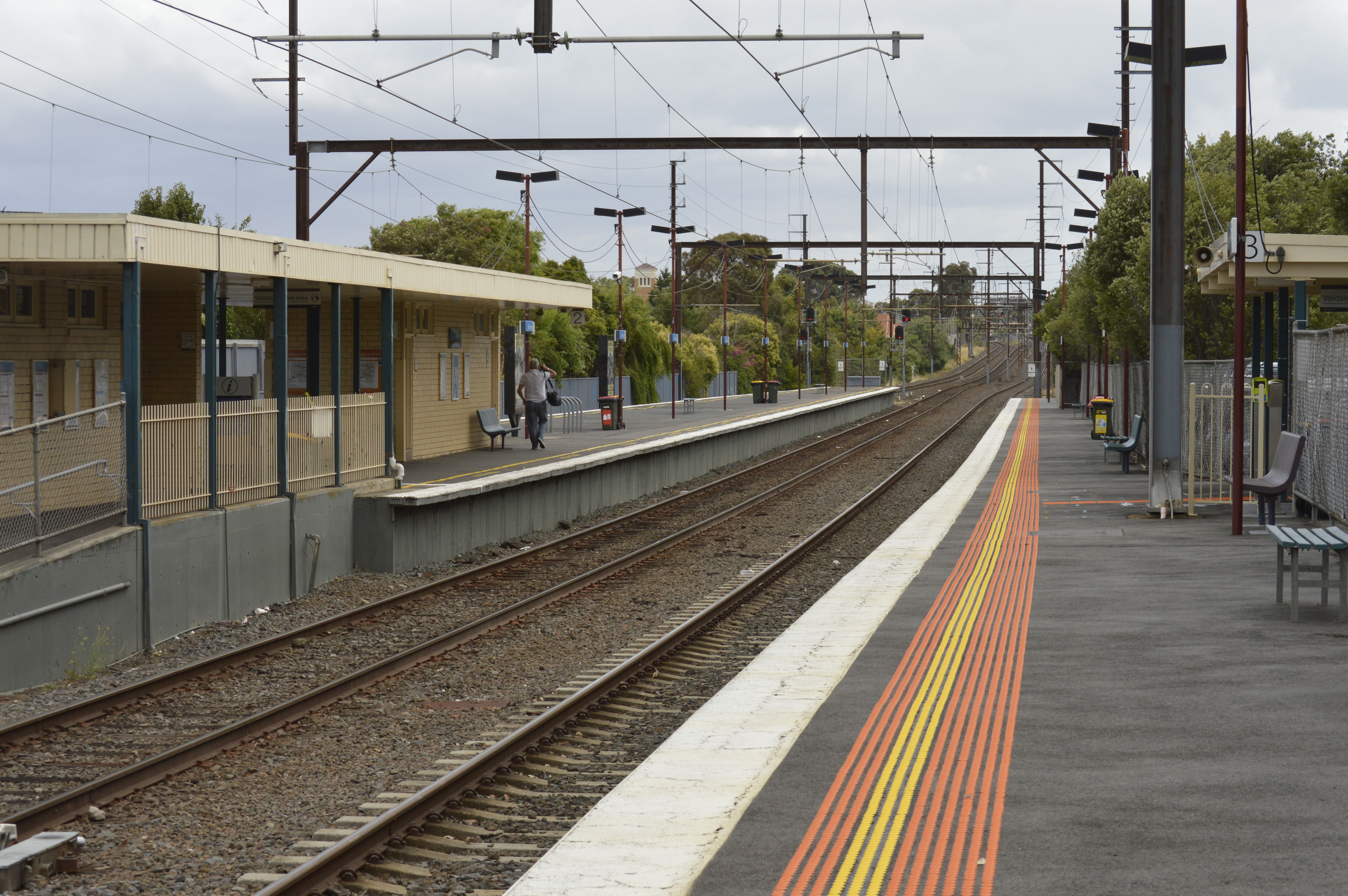
McKinnon station in June 2014, prior to its 2016 rebuild

McKinnon station opened on 1 September 1884, almost three years after the railway line from Caulfield was extended to Mordialloc. The station gets its name from McKinnon Road, which was reputedly named after a local settler.

In 1928, mechanically-operated boom gates were provided at the former McKinnon Road level crossing, which was located at the down end of the station. It was the only instance of these types of gates being used at a level crossing in Victoria. In 1974, they were replaced with conventional boom barriers.

During 1976, the down platform (Platform 3) at the former ground level station was provided. Just over a decade later, on 28 June 1987, the up face of the former island platform was brought into use.

In May 2015, the Victorian State Government announced a grade separation project to replace the McKinnon Road level crossing, immediately south of the station. This included rebuilding the station. On 1 August 2016, the rebuilt station opened.

== Platforms and services ==
McKinnon has one island platform with two faces and one side platform. Prior to being closed for its 2016 rebuild, in the morning peak-hour, Frankston-bound services used Platform 3, with Flinders Street-bound services using Platforms 1 and 2. At other times, Frankston-bound services used Platform 2.

Following the re-construction of Glen Huntly station in July 2023, Frankston-bound services use Platform 3, while Platform 2 is not regularly used and non-stopping express trains pass the platform in the peak hour.

It is serviced by Metro Trains' Frankston line services.

McKinnon platform arrangement
Platform	Line	Destination	Via	Service Type	Notes	Source
1	Frankston line	Flinders Street	City Loop	All stations and limited express services		
2	Frankston line				Services may occasionally stop at this platform. Peak hour services run express through this station.	
3	Frankston line	Frankston, Cheltenham, Mordialloc or Carrum		All stations		

== Transport links ==
CDC Melbourne operates one route via McKinnon station, under contract to Public Transport Victoria:

- 626 : Middle Brighton station – Chadstone Shopping Centre
