= McKinnon, Victoria =

McKinnon
- Suburb
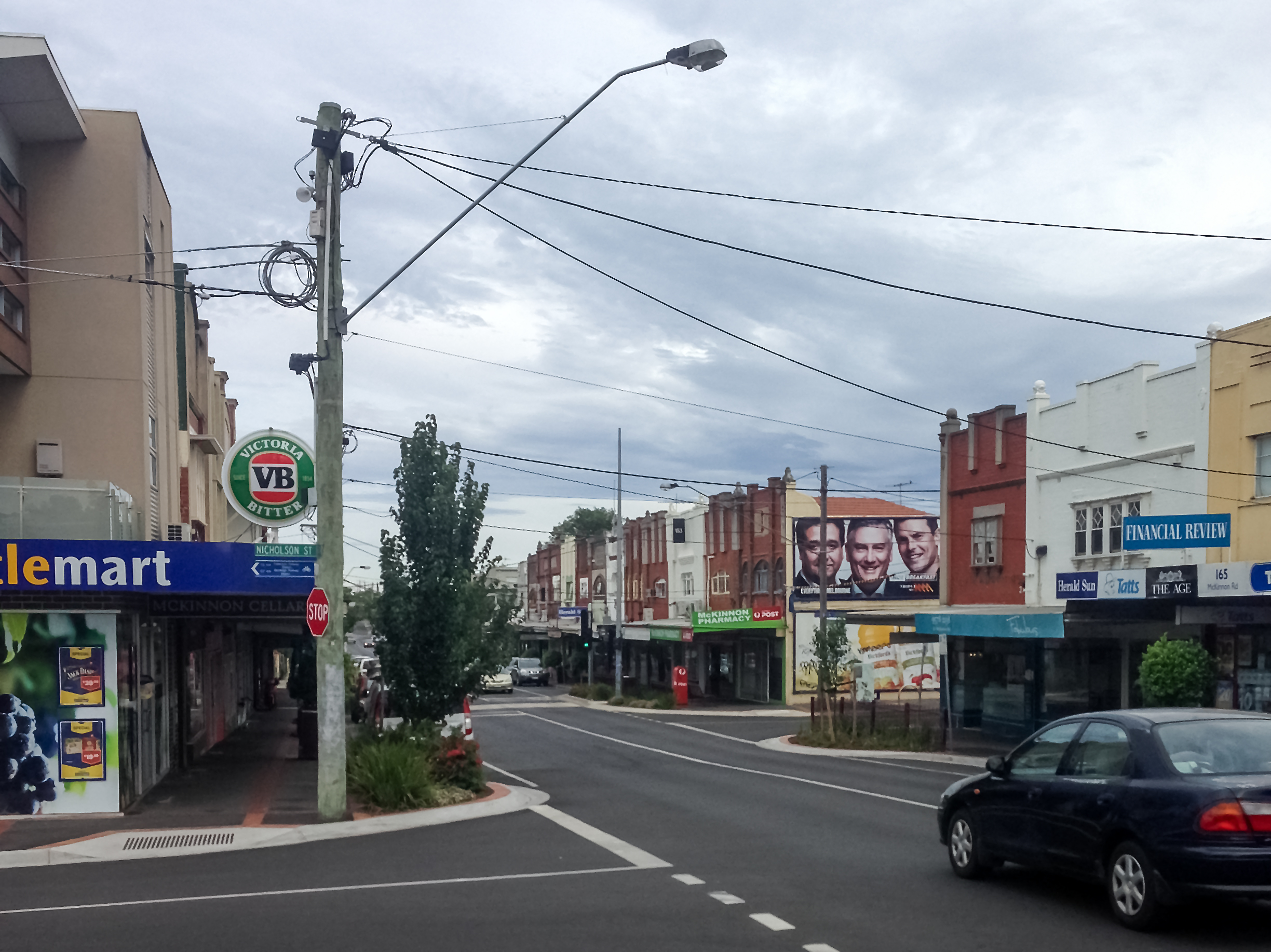
- Shops on McKinnon Road

- Interactive map of McKinnon
- Coordinates: 37.91°S 145.039°E
- Country: Australia
- State: Victoria
- City: Melbourne
- LGA: City of Glen Eira
- Location: 15 km (9.3 mi) from Melbourne

Government
  - State electorate: Bentleigh
  - Federal division: Goldstein

Area
  - Total: 1.5 km^{2} (0.58 sq mi)
- Elevation: 33 m (108 ft)

Population
  - Total: 6,878 (SAL 2021)
- Postcode: 3204
Suburbs around McKinnon
Caulfield South	Ormond	Murrumbeena
Brighton East	McKinnon	Bentleigh East
Brighton East	Bentleigh	Bentleigh East

McKinnon is a suburb in Melbourne, Victoria, Australia, 12 km south-east of Melbourne's Central Business District, located within the City of Glen Eira local government area. McKinnon recorded a population of 6,878 at the 2021 census.

McKinnon is bounded by Murray Road, Lewis Street and Blackshaw Street to the north, Tucker Road to the east, Abergeldie Avenue, Lindsay Street, Field Street, Nicholson Street, Fitzroy Street and Elster Creek to the south and Thomas Street to the west. It contains parks such as Wattle Grove Park, Allnutt Park and Joyce Park. Until 1941 the territory of the suburb was a part of Bentleigh, while the part of current McKinnon Road to the East from Jasper Road was named Manchester Road.

== History ==
McKinnon expanded in the early 1900s due to the McKinnon railway station. McKinnon Road features McKinnon's main shopping strip and many back alleys run along the rear on either side. During the 1990s there was a gradual decline in the variety of shops on McKinnon's main shopping strip. This was highlighted by the loss of a butcher, green grocer, independent supermarket, nursery, bank, library and doctor's surgery. However, in recent years the shopping strip has begun to reinvent itself with the emergence of a small but noticeable cafe culture.

The Post Office opened on 9 March 1915 as Manchester Road, and was renamed Bentleigh North in 1949 and McKinnon in 1964.

McKinnon is also home to a World War II memorial located at 119 McKinnon Rd. The memorial gives the names of soldiers from the area who were killed in the war.

McKinnon Secondary College is the suburb's secondary school.

== Public transport ==
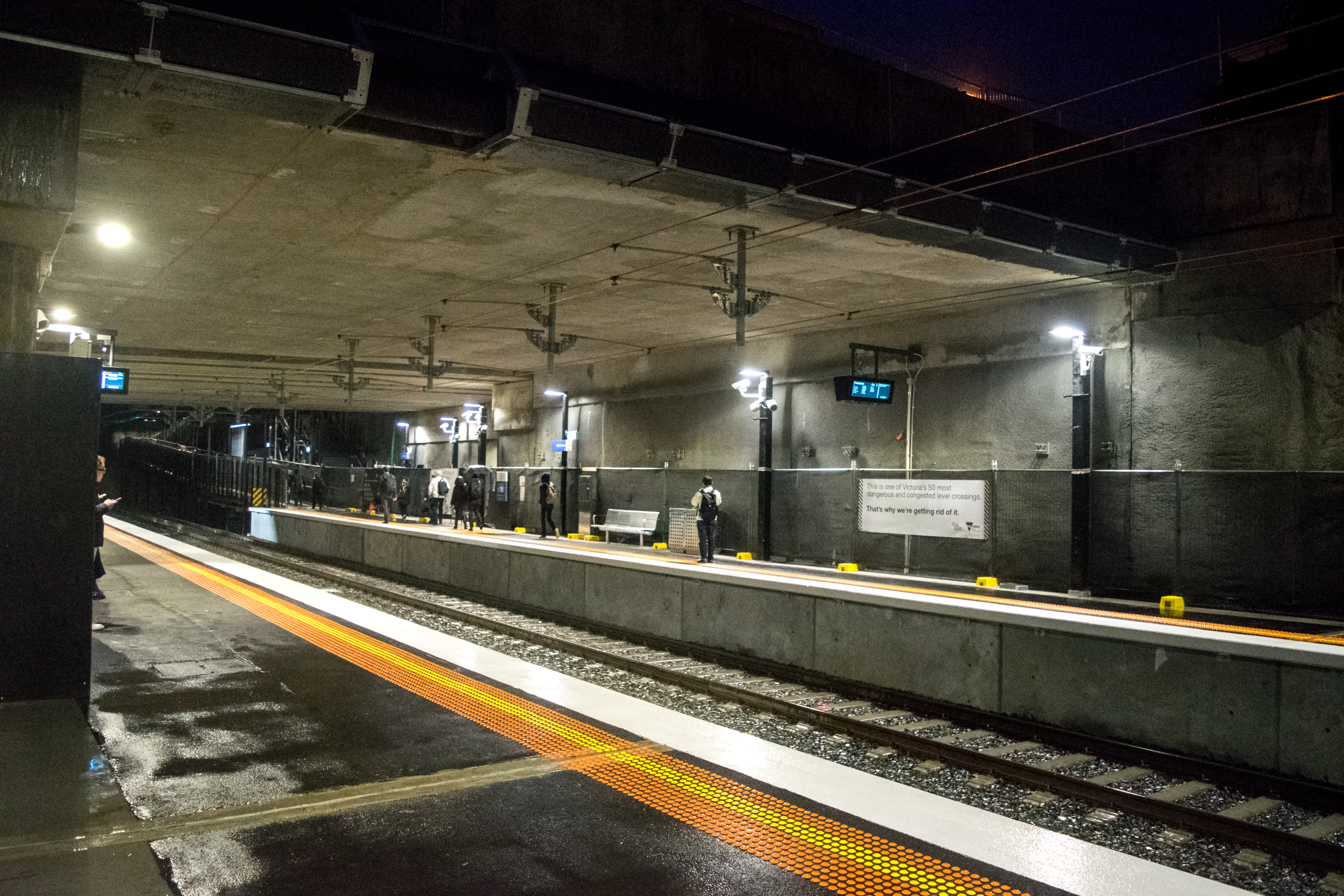
Train station at Mckinnon

The suburb is serviced by the McKinnon railway station on the Frankston line The station is located within both Zones 1 and 2 and is complemented by Melbourne route 626 bus service.

== Housing ==
Most of the houses in the McKinnon area are 1930s California bungalows. This has undergone a great change since the early 2000s featuring many new apartments.

== Sport ==
The suburb has an Australian Rules football team, St Pauls Mckinnon Football Club, competing in the Southern Football League.

== See also ==
- City of Moorabbin – McKinnon was previously within this former local government area.
