= Mentone railway station =

Railway station in Melbourne, Australia

Mentone
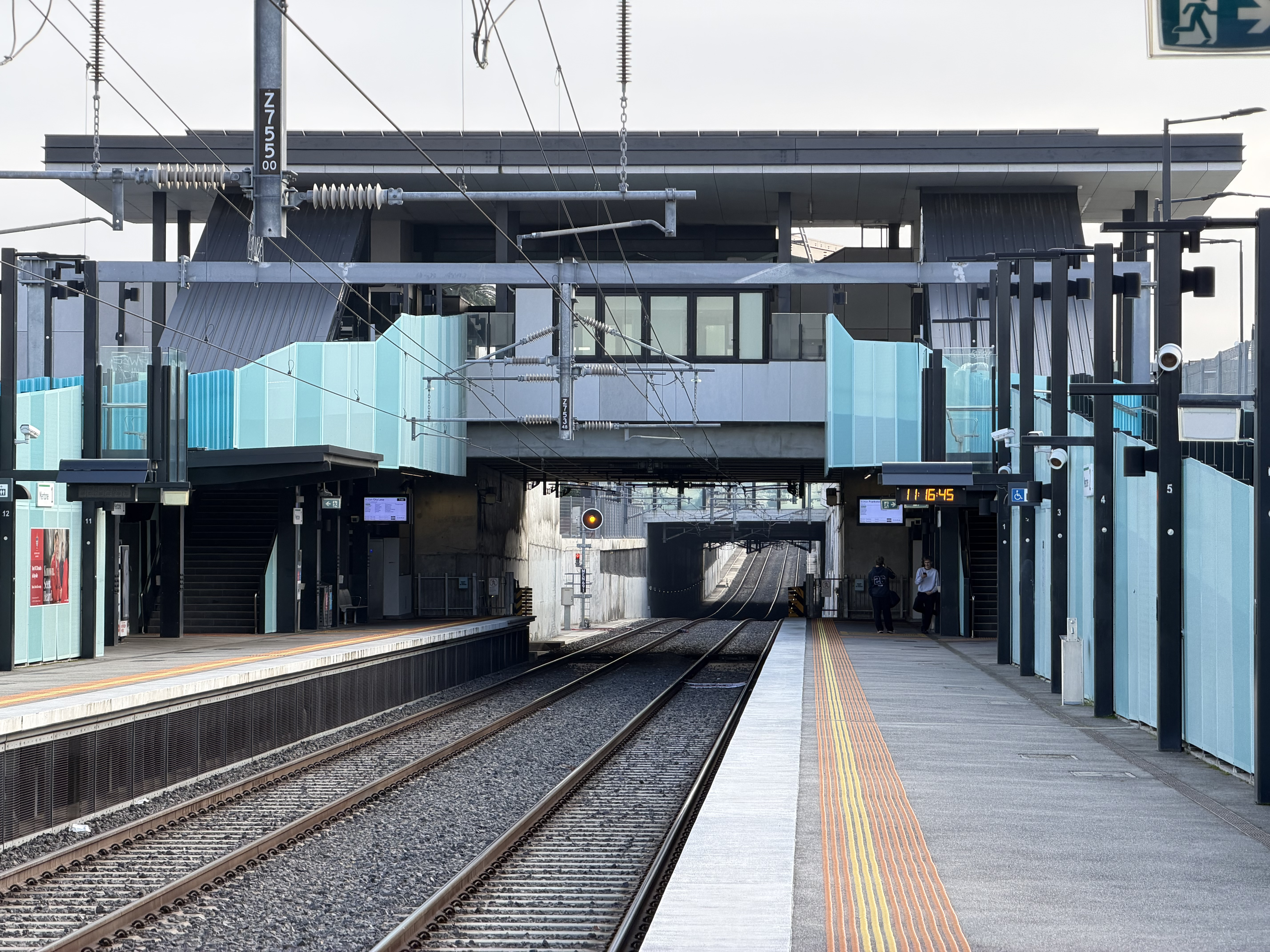
- Northbound view from Platform 2, June 2026

General information
- Location: Como Parade West, Mentone, Victoria 3194; City of Kingston; Australia
- Coordinates: 37°58′55″S 145°03′55″E
- System: PTV commuter rail station
- Owner: VicTrack
- Operator: Metro Trains
- Line: Frankston
- Distance: 24.36 kilometres from Southern Cross
- Platforms: 2 side
- Tracks: 2
- Connections: Bus; SkyBus

Construction
- Structure type: Below ground
- Parking: 300
- Cycle facilities: 8
- Accessible: Yes—step free access

Other information
- Status: Operational, premium station
- Station code: MEN
- Fare zone: Myki zone 2
- Website: Public Transport Victoria

History
- Opened: 19 December 1881; 144 years ago
- Rebuilt: 20 July 2020 (LXRP)
- Electrified: June 1922 (1500 V DC overhead)
- Former names: Balcombe Road (1881-1882); Balcombe (1882-1884)

Passengers
- 2005–2006: 759,507
- 2006–2007: 790,519 ▲4.08%
- 2007–2008: 873,749 ▲10.52%
- 2008–2009: 914,762 ▲4.69%
- 2009–2010: 927,424 ▲1.38%
- 2010–2011: 980,363 ▲5.7%
- 2011–2012: 1,031,443 ▲5.21%
- 2012–2013: Not measured
- 2013–2014: 902,016 ▼12.54%
- 2014–2015: 906,626 ▲0.51%
- 2015–2016: 887,937 ▼2.06%
- 2016–2017: 865,831 ▼2.48%
- 2017–2018: 915,608 ▲5.74%
- 2018–2019: 892,167 ▼2.56%
- 2019–2020: 528,700 ▼40.74%
- 2020–2021: 362,550 ▼31.42%
- 2021–2022: 424,350 ▲17.04%
- 2022–2023: 588,750 ▲38.74%

Services
Preceding station	Metro Trains	Following station
Cheltenham towards Flinders Street via City Loop	Frankston line	Parkdale towards Frankston
Track layout
Location

Mentone station is a railway station operated by Metro Trains Melbourne on the Frankston line, part of the Melbourne rail network. It serves the south-eastern suburb of Mentone, in Melbourne, Victoria, Australia. Mentone station is a below ground premium station, featuring two side platforms. It opened on 19 December 1881, with the current station provided in July 2020.

Initially opened as Balcombe Road, the station was renamed two times. It was renamed to Balcombe on 1 September 1882, then was given its current name of Mentone on 7 January 1884.

It is classed as a premium station, and is listed on the Victorian Heritage Register.

== History ==
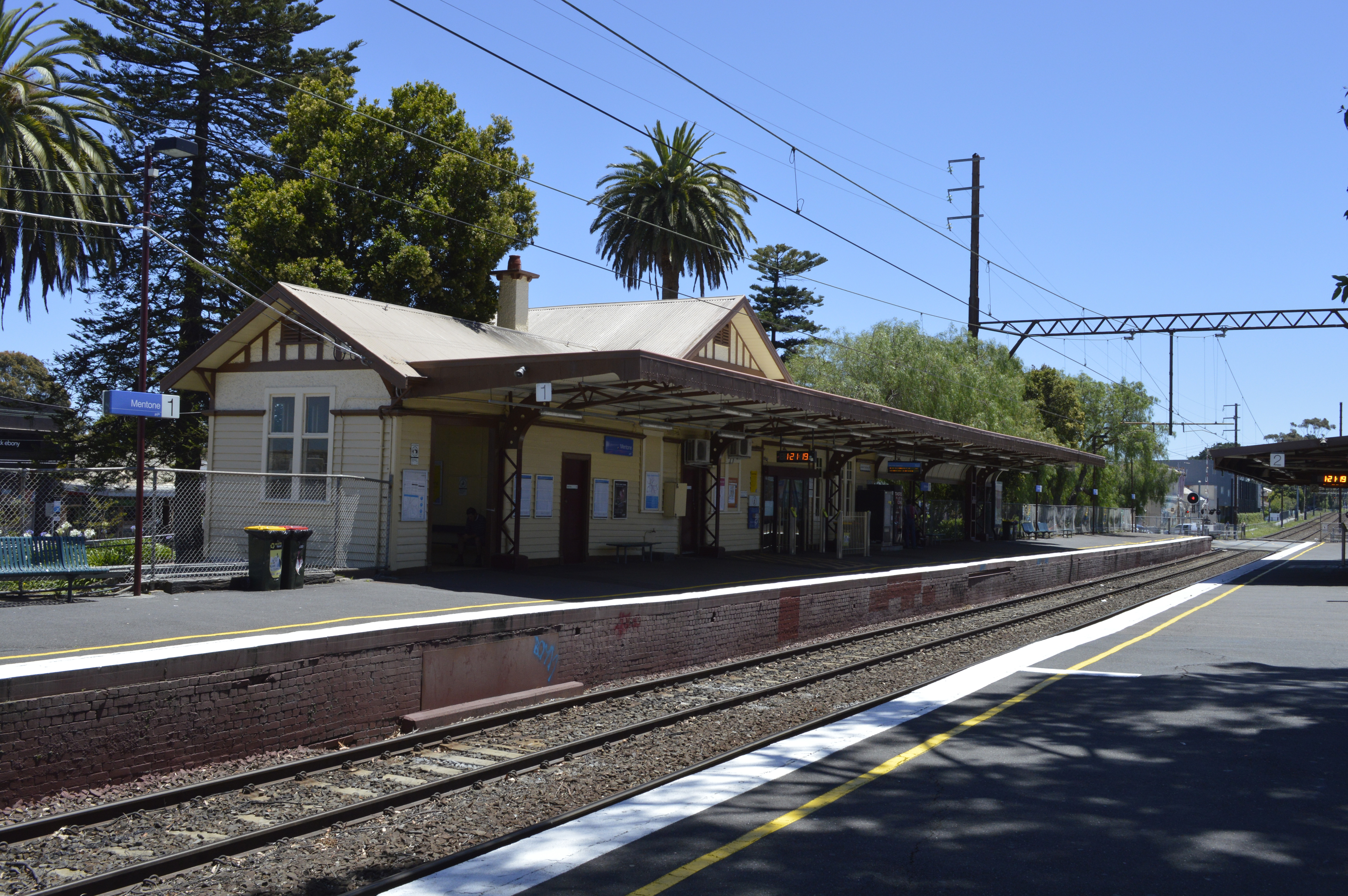
Former ground level station platforms in December 2013

Mentone station opened on 1 September 1882, when the railway line from Caulfield was extended to Mordialloc. Like the suburb itself, the station is named after the French Riviera resort Menton.

Until the 1940s, a former siding at the station existed, operating across Station Street to a timber yard.

In 1959, boom barriers replaced interlocked gates at the former Balcombe Road level crossing, which was located at the up end of the station.

In 1981, the goods yard was closed to traffic. In late 1984/early 1985, a number of sidings and a headshunt at the station were abolished. Also occurring in 1985, the signal box and interlocking were abolished.

In December 2007, Mentone was upgraded to a Premium Station.

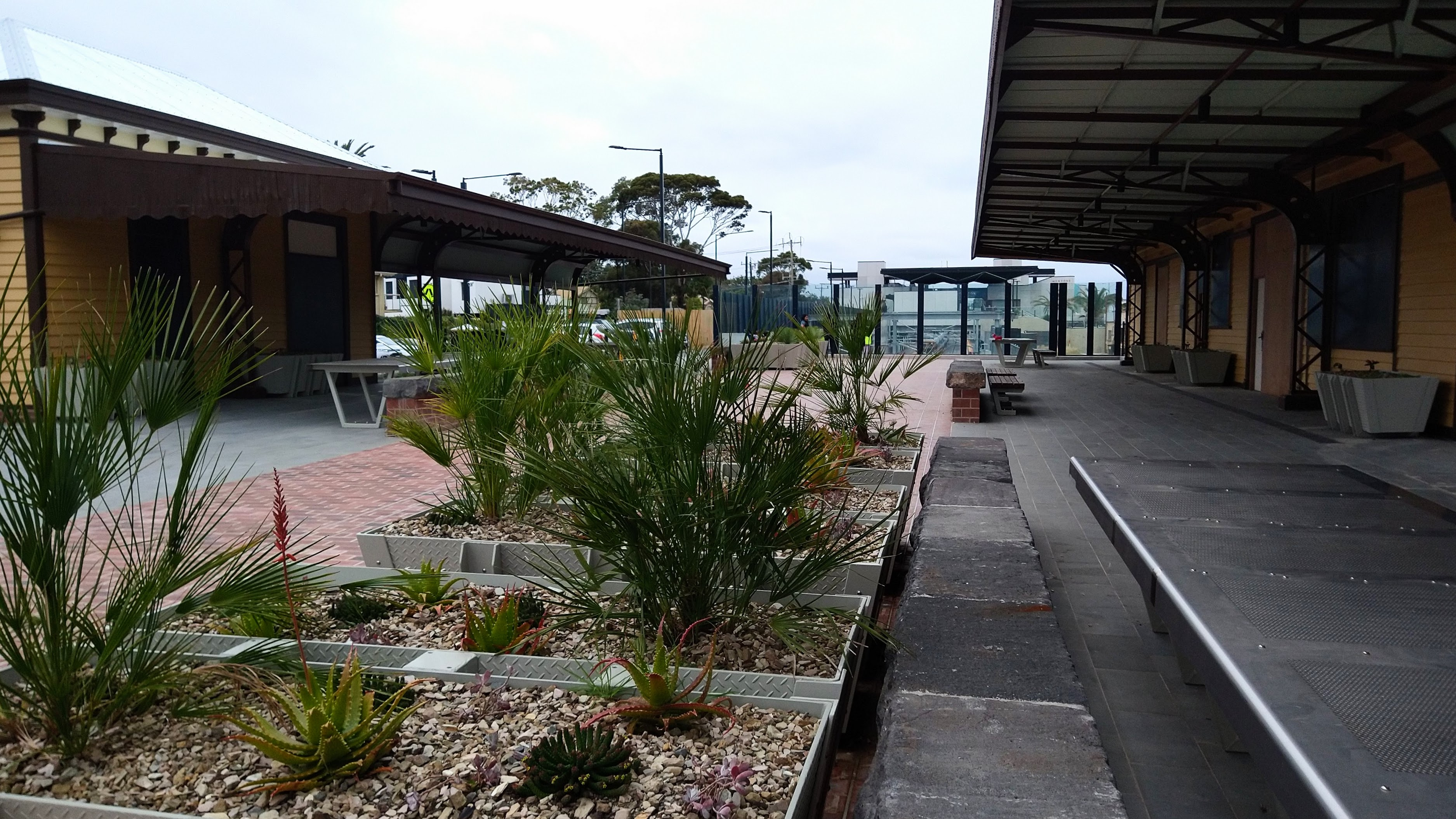
Heritage listed station buildings used for the former ground level station on display after Level Crossing Removal Project works, March 2021

On 20 March 2020, the station was closed from 8:15pm to allow for works to remove the three level crossings at Balcombe, Charman and Park Roads, and to build a new Mentone station. On 20 July of that year, the rebuilt station opened. The former heritage station buildings were retained as part of the project.

== Platforms and services ==
Mentone has two side platforms. It is serviced by Metro Trains' Frankston line services.

Mentone platform arrangement
Platform	Line	Destination	Via	Service Type	Source
1	Frankston line	Flinders Street	City Loop	All stations and limited express services	
2	Frankston line	Frankston or Carrum		All stations	

== Transport links ==
Kinetic Melbourne operates one SmartBus route via Mentone station, under contract to Public Transport Victoria:

- SmartBus 903 : Altona station – Mordialloc

Ventura Bus Lines operates four routes via Mentone station, under contract to Public Transport Victoria:

- 708 : Hampton station – Carrum station
- 811 : Dandenong station – Brighton
- 812 : Dandenong station – Brighton
- 825 : Moorabbin station – Westfield Southland

SkyBus also operates a service to Melbourne Airport via Mentone station.
