= Mickey Sharp =

Australian rules footballer, born 1914

Personal information
- Full name: Alfred Sharp
- Born: 14 November 1914
- Died: 15 March 2003 (aged 88)
- Original team: North Fitzroy Juniors
- Height: 173 cm (5 ft 8 in)
- Weight: 77 kg (170 lb)

Playing career^{1}
Years	Club	Games (Goals)
1932–1941	Fitzroy	104 (90)
- ^{1} Playing statistics correct to the end of 1941.

Alfred "Mickey" Sharp (14 November 1914 – 15 March 2003) was an Australian rules footballer who played with Fitzroy in the Victorian Football League (VFL).

Sharp was the son of 1904 Fitzroy premiership player Alf Sharp.

A rover, he played 104 games for Fitzroy, from 1932 to 1941.

He twice represented Victoria at interstate football, both times in 1938.
