= Frankston line =

Passenger rail service in metropolitan Melbourne, Victoria, Australia

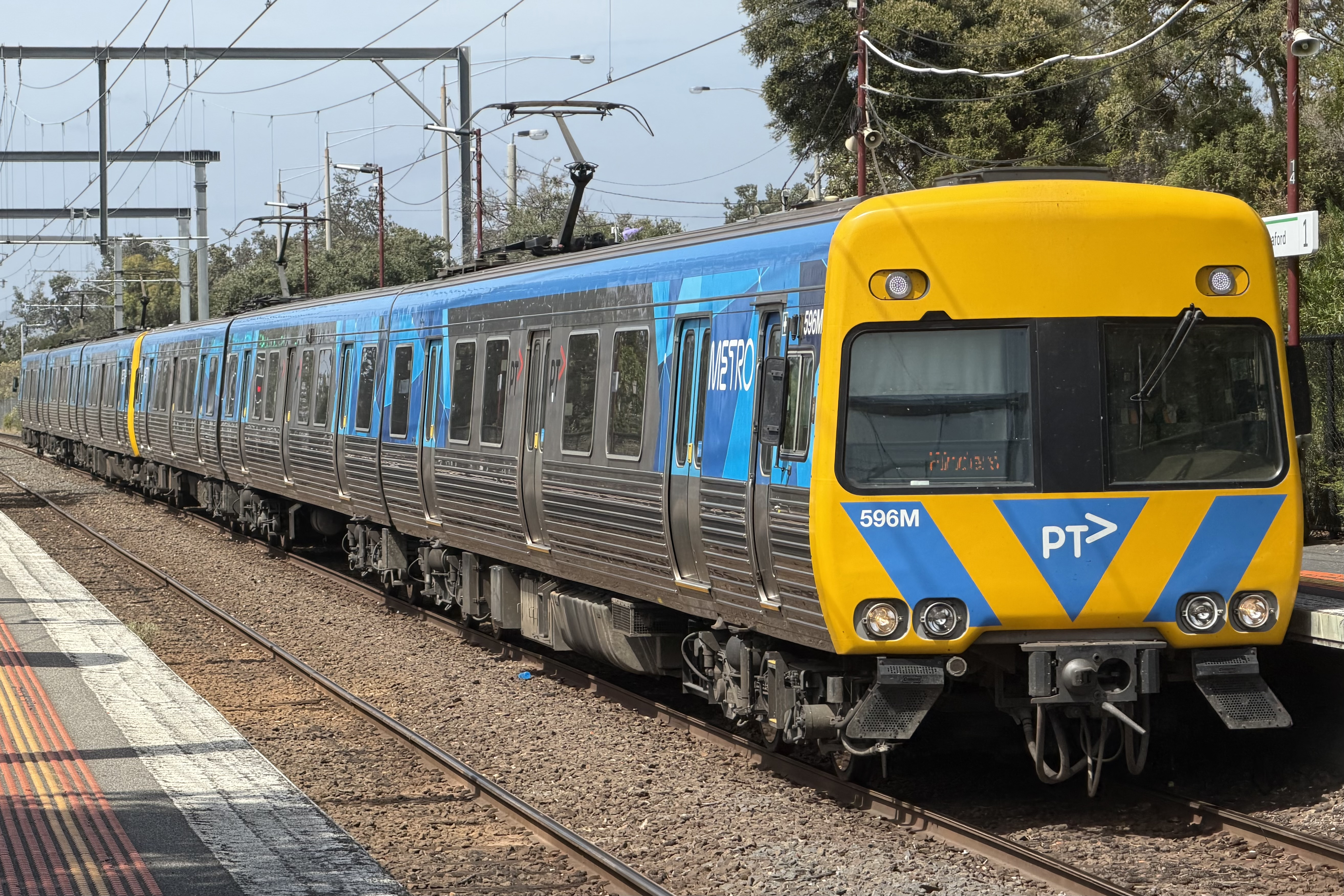
- An Alstom Comeng train at Seaford station, January 2026

Overview
- Service type: Commuter rail
- System: Melbourne railway network
- Status: Operational
- Locale: Melbourne, Victoria, Australia
- Predecessor: Mordialloc (1881–1882)
- First service: 19 December 1881; 144 years ago
- Current operator: Metro Trains
- Former operators: Victorian Railways (VR) (1881–1974); VR as VicRail (1974–1983); MTA (The Met) (1983–1989); PTC (The Met) (1989–1998); Bayside Trains (1998–2000); M>Train (2000–2004); Connex Melbourne (2004–2009)

Route
- Termini: Flinders Street; Frankston
- Stops: 28
- Distance travelled: 43.23 km (26.86 mi)
- Average journey time: 1 hour 7 minutes
- Service frequency: 5–10 minutes weekdays peak; 10 minutes weekdays off-peak and weekend afternoons; 20 minutes at nights and weekend mornings; 60 minutes early weekend mornings
- Line used: Frankston

Technical
- Rolling stock: Comeng, Siemens Nexas, X'Trapolis 100, X'Trapolis 2.0
- Track gauge: 1,600 mm (5 ft 3 in)
- Electrification: 1500 V DC overhead
- Track owner: VicTrack

The Frankston line is a commuter railway line in the city of Melbourne, Victoria, Australia. Operated by Metro Trains Melbourne, it is the city's third-longest metropolitan railway line, at 42.7 kilometres (26.5 mi). The line runs from Flinders Street station in central Melbourne to Frankston station in the south-east, serving 28 stations via South Yarra, Caulfield, Moorabbin, and Mordialloc. The line continues to Stony Point on the non-electrified Stony Point line. The line operates for approximately 20 hours a day (from approximately 4:00 am to around 11:30 pm) with 24 hour service available on Friday and Saturday nights. During peak hour, headways of up to 5 to 10 minutes are operated with services every 10–20 minutes during off-peak hours. Trains on the Frankston line run with a two three-car formations of Comeng, Siemens Nexas, and X'Trapolis 100 trainsets.

Sections of the Frankston line opened as early as 1881, with the line fully extended to Frankston in 1882. A limited number of stations were first opened, with infill stations progressively opened between 1881 and 2017. The line was built to connect Melbourne with the rural towns of Caulfield, Moorabbin, and Frankston, amongst others. Significant growth has occurred since opening, with a plan to extend the Frankston line along part of the Stony Point line to Baxter.

Since the 2010s, due to the heavily utilised infrastructure of the Frankston line, significant improvements and upgrades have been made. Different packages of works have upgraded the corridor to replace sleepers, upgrading signalling technology, the introduction of new rolling stock, and the removal of all level crossings.

== History ==
=== 19th century ===
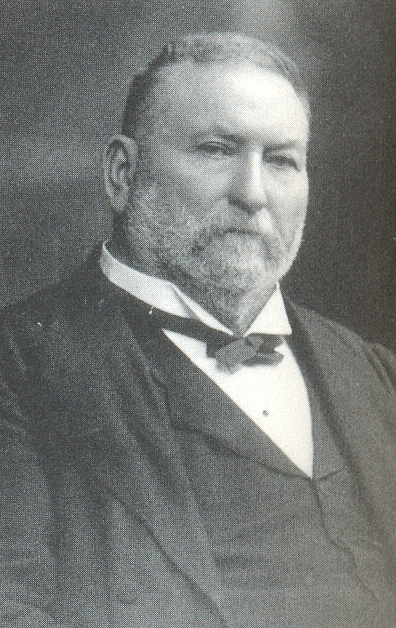
The line was opened by Minister for Railways Thomas Bent in 1881

In 1881, the Frankston line began operations by the Victorian Railways on a single tracked line from Caulfield to Mordialloc. Mordialloc station was officially opened on 19 December 1881 by Sir Thomas Bent, a corrupt politician who was the Minister of Railways, and later becoming the Premier of Victoria between 1904 and 1909 and had purchased land in Melbourne’s south east to build a train line toward it and then re-sell the land for significant profit. The first train to arrive at Mordialloc was a special service from Princes Bridge, which collected school children from the Brighton area. Further specials occurred during the day, with proper timetabled services commencing the following day. Six services were provided upon opening and, apart from two services, all were shuttle services operating between Caulfield and Mordialloc.

In August 1882, operations were extended from Mordialloc to Frankston. The section of track from Caulfield to Mordialloc was duplicated in 1888. In 1883 the line between Richmond station and South Yarra was quadrupled to accommodate an increase in train services due to the opening of Frankston and Sandringham lines.

In 1885, a number of level crossing removal works occurred between Flinders Street station and South Yarra due to an increase in freight and passenger operations. These crossings were removed through a combination of lowering and raising the corridor.

=== 20th century ===
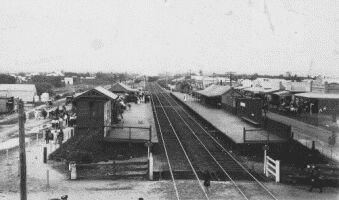
Chelsea station following the duplication in 1910

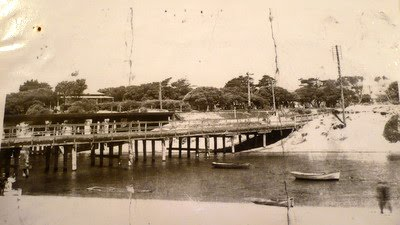
The original bridge over the Patterson River (pictured here) was rebuilt in 1974

In 1910, the remaining track from Mordialloc to Frankston was duplicated. In 1915, the line between South Yarra and Caulfield was quadrupled, as part of level crossing removal works. This section of the line was lowered into a cutting to eliminate numerous level crossings. Power signalling was provided between Richmond and Hawksburn at the same time, then on to Caulfield in 1921.

Electrification of the line to Frankston occurred in three stages during 1922. In March 1922, the section from South Yarra to Glen Huntly station was electrified, with the section to Mordialloc being electrified in June 1922, and the final section to Frankston being completed by August 1922. The electrification of the line allowed for the introduction of Swing Door electric multiple unit trains for the first time.

The introduction of power signalling on the line begun in 1933 with the section from Caulfield to Glen Huntly, with the remainder of the line converted in stages from 1958 to 1986. The current bridge over the Patterson River was provided in 1974, replacing the previous trestle bridge.

In 1981, Frankston line services commenced operations through the City Loop, after previously terminating at Flinders or Spencer Street stations. The commencement of operations involved the service stopping at three new stations—Parliament, Melbourne Central (formally Museum), and Flagstaff. The Loop follows La Trobe and Spring Streets along the northern and eastern edges of the Hoddle Grid. The Loop connects with Melbourne's two busiest stations, Flinders Street and Southern Cross, via the elevated Flinders Street Viaduct.

Triplication of the line from Caulfield to Moorabbin from two to three tracks was announced by Transport Minister Steve Crabb in 1984, at a cost of A$10 million. Construction of the additional track was designed to increase peak hour capacity and to provide express services on the corridor, with time savings of more than 10 minutes from Frankston. Work begun in July that year, with works about half-done by February 1985, with a completion by the end of 1985. The introduction of services on the new track was delayed by two years till June 1987. Further plans announced in the 1970s included the extension of the third track to Mordialloc, however, these plans failed to materialise.

=== 21st century ===
A 2007, restructure of train ticketing in Melbourne involved the removal of Zone 3, with Zone 3 stations being re-classified to Zone 2. This brought the cost of train fares down, improving system accessibility to the public. All stations between Patterson and Frankston were rezoned to Zone 2.

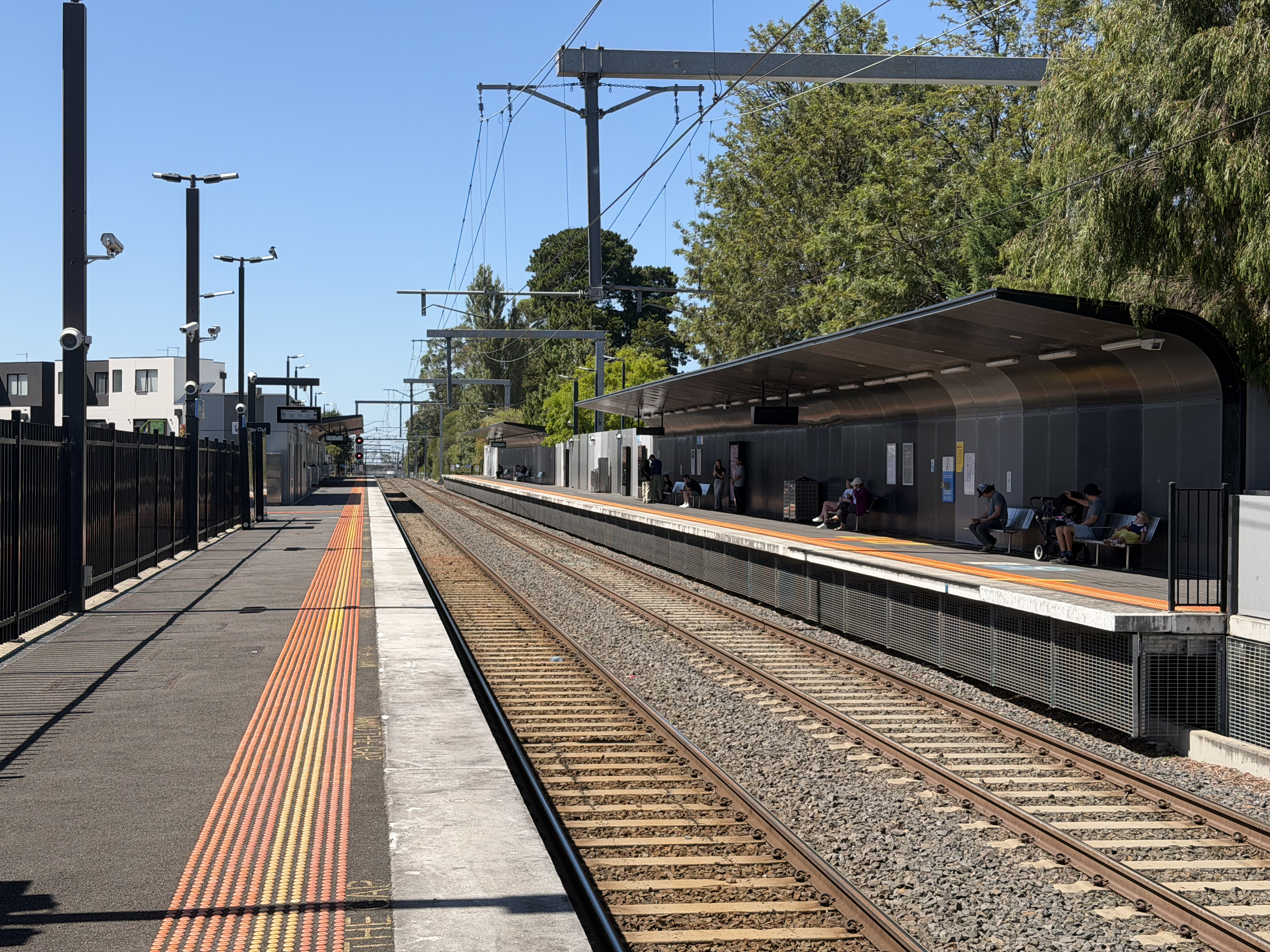
Southland station was opened in November 2017

At the 2010 state election, both the Labor Party and the Liberal Party promised to provide a new Premium station between Highett and Cheltenham, to serve the Westfield Southland shopping centre. The station was projected to cost $13 million, and have two platforms and shelters with a projected usage of 1,400 passengers daily. The new station opened on 26 November 2017 as Southland station. In 2013, the line, along with the Werribee and Williamstown lines, were upgraded as part of the Bayside Rail Project. The upgrade included station refurbishments, track, signal, and electrical upgrades to allow X'Trapolis trains to operate on these lines.

In 2021, the metropolitan timetable underwent a major rewrite, resulting in all Frankston line trains operating direct between Richmond and Flinders Street before continuing onto the Werribee and Williamstown lines. Under these changes, Frankston services no longer operate via the City Loop, with an additional 45 new services each week. The additional services upgraded frequencies to a train every 5 minutes in peak hour, every 10 minutes throughout the day, and every 20 minutes until midnight.

As a result of level crossing removal works at Mordialloc station, trains on the Frankston Line were altered to run to a reduced timetable beyond Cheltenham station. This was a result of the demolition of one of the platforms at Mordialloc station.

Since 1 February 2026, following the completion of the Big Switch, the Pakenham and Cranbourne lines began operating exclusively through the Metro Tunnel, while the Frankston line officially returned to the City Loop in the anticlockwise direction.

Following the completion of grade separation works at Mordialloc in May 2026, all services were reinstated beyond Cheltenham with a dozen new services a week provided which brought the peak hour frequency up to every 4 minutes.

== Future ==
=== Level Crossing Removals ===
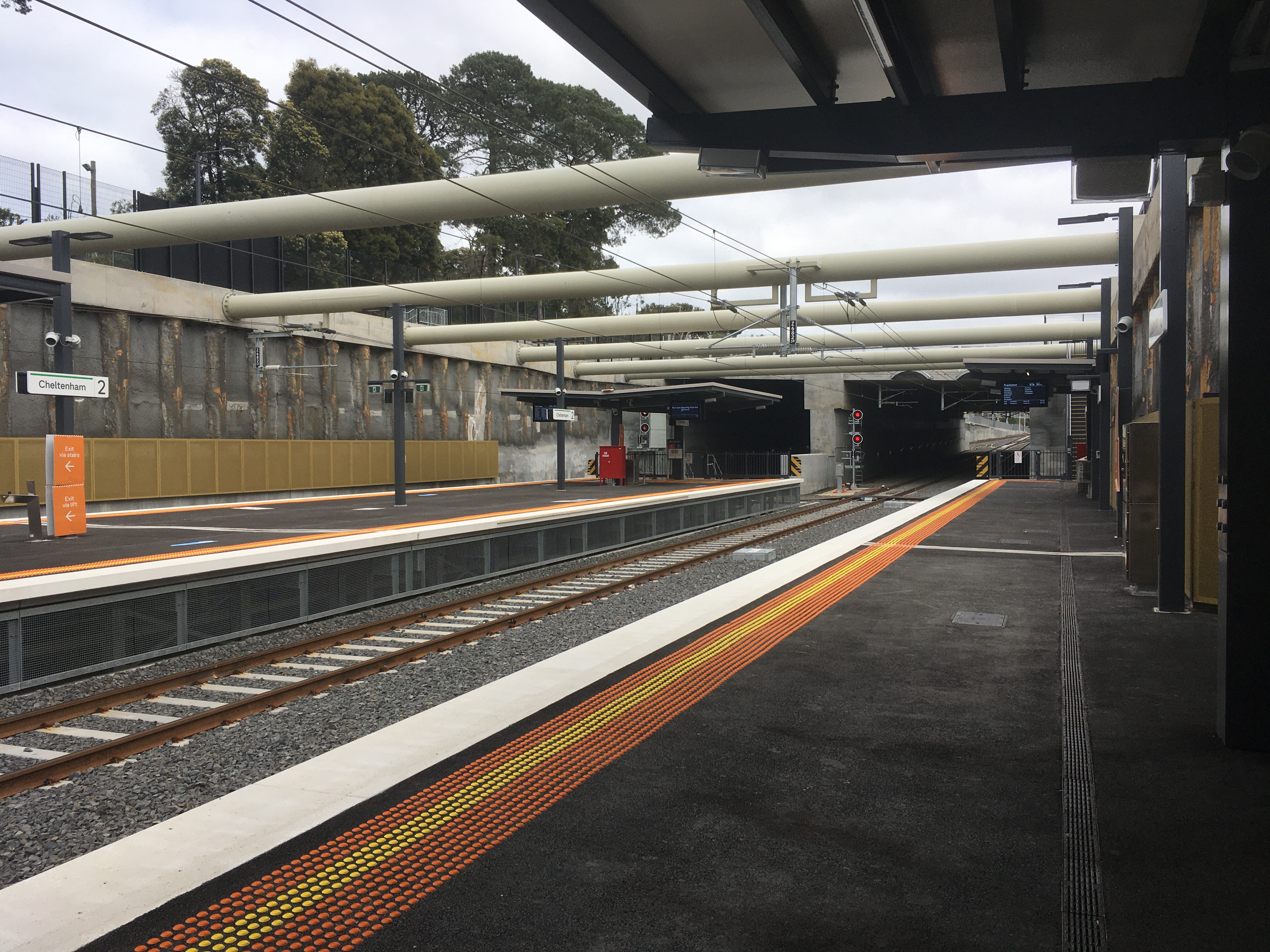
Cheltenham station was lowered to remove the adjacent crossing at Charman road

The Level Crossing Removal Project has announced the removal of all 23 remaining level crossings on the Frankston line, to be completed in stages from 2016 to 2029. Different removal packages have been announced in 2014, 2018, and 2022 to coincide with different state elections and to be delivered in stages up until 2029. All of the various removals have involved the rail under or rail over methods, with some crossing closures also undertaken by the Project. At the conclusion of the project, all level crossings between the city and Frankston station will be full grade operated through a variety of methods.

=== Connection to Craigieburn line and City Loop reconfiguration ===
Stage 4 of the Network Development Plan – Metropolitan Rail outlines a longer‑term proposal in which the Craigieburn and Frankston lines would be joined through a reconfigured City Loop during the 2030s. Under this concept, services linking the two corridors would operate exclusively through the City Loop and would not pass through Flinders Street or Southern Cross. This forms part of a broader strategy to create dedicated end‑to‑end line pairings and reduce reliance on surface platforms in the central city. The timeframe for implementing this stage has not yet been confirmed.

=== Baxter Extension ===
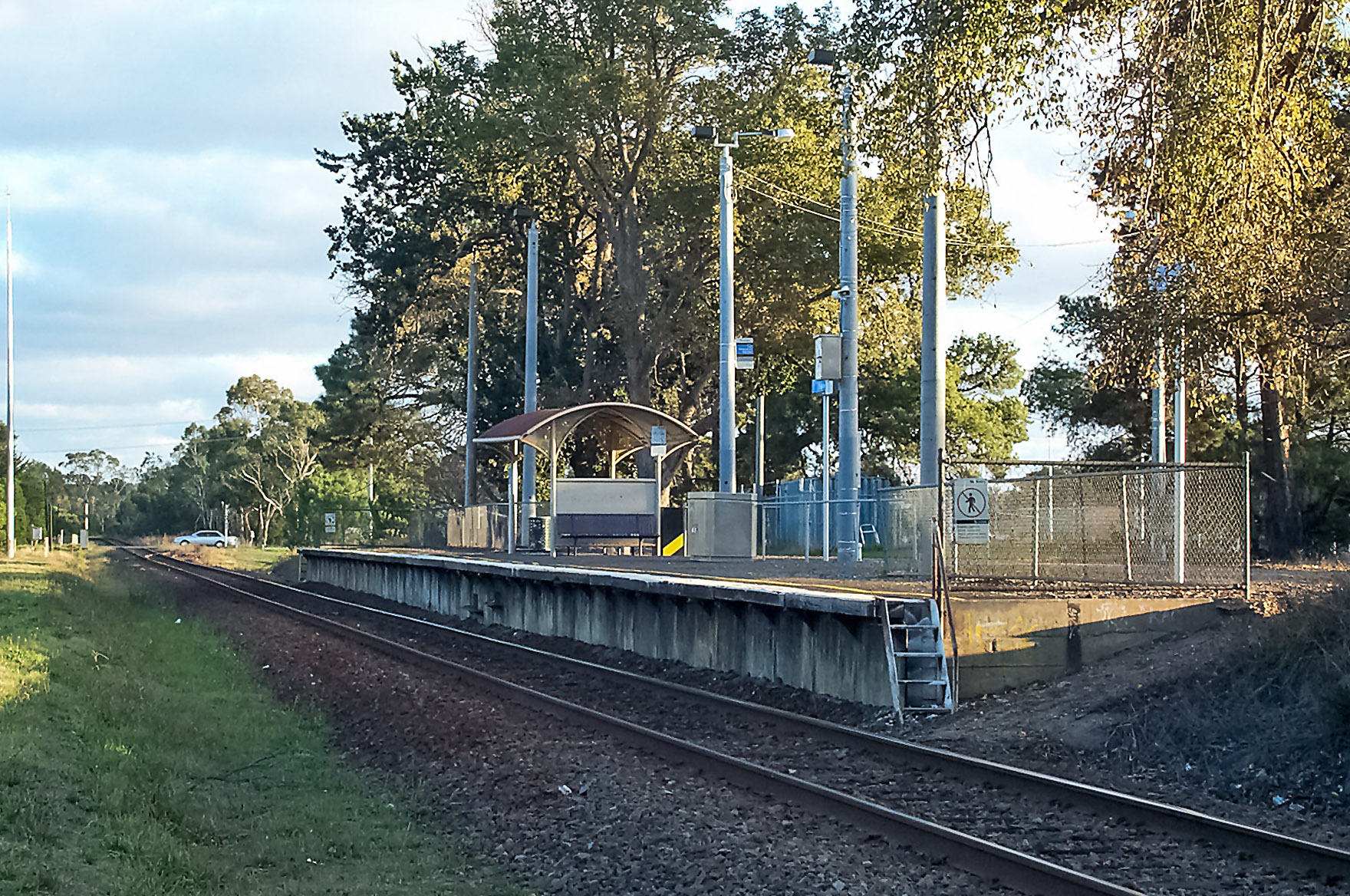
Baxter station on the Stony Point line, April 2008

In 2013, as part of Public Transport Victoria's Network Development Plan for metropolitan rail, an extension of the Frankston line to Baxter was earmarked to begin in the "long-term", which would equate to at least 2033. The proposal would link Frankston to Baxter through an electrified dual-line following the Stony Point line. In 2018, the Liberal Party announced a project to extend electrified services to Baxter during the 2018 state election. The project would have included the removal of all crossings between Frankston and Baxter, duplication and electrification works, the reconstruction and redevelopment of the stations at Leawarra and Langwarrin respectively to facilitate electrification.

The Federal Liberals announced $450 million of joint funding for the project promised between the state and federal governments. The incumbent Andrews Labor government argued that the project was not needed, instead prioritising funding to other projects across the state. A business case commissioned by the government was completed in 2019 with no further progress being made.

Again in the lead up to the 2022 state election, the Liberal opposition supported the electrification to Baxter. The incumbent Andrews government made no commitments to the Baxter rail extension, instead continuing construction on level crossing removal works along the Frankston line and the delivery of the Metro Tunnel and Suburban Rail Loop. The 2022 state election resulted in another Labor victory, with the Andrews government pushing ahead with these works.

== Network and operations ==
=== Services ===
Services on the Frankston line operates from approximately 4:00 am to around 11:30 daily. In general, during peak hours, train frequency is 10 minutes during the peak period while services during non-peak hours drops to 10–20 minutes throughout the entire route. On Friday nights and weekends, services run 24 hours a day, with 60 minute frequencies available outside of normal operating hours.

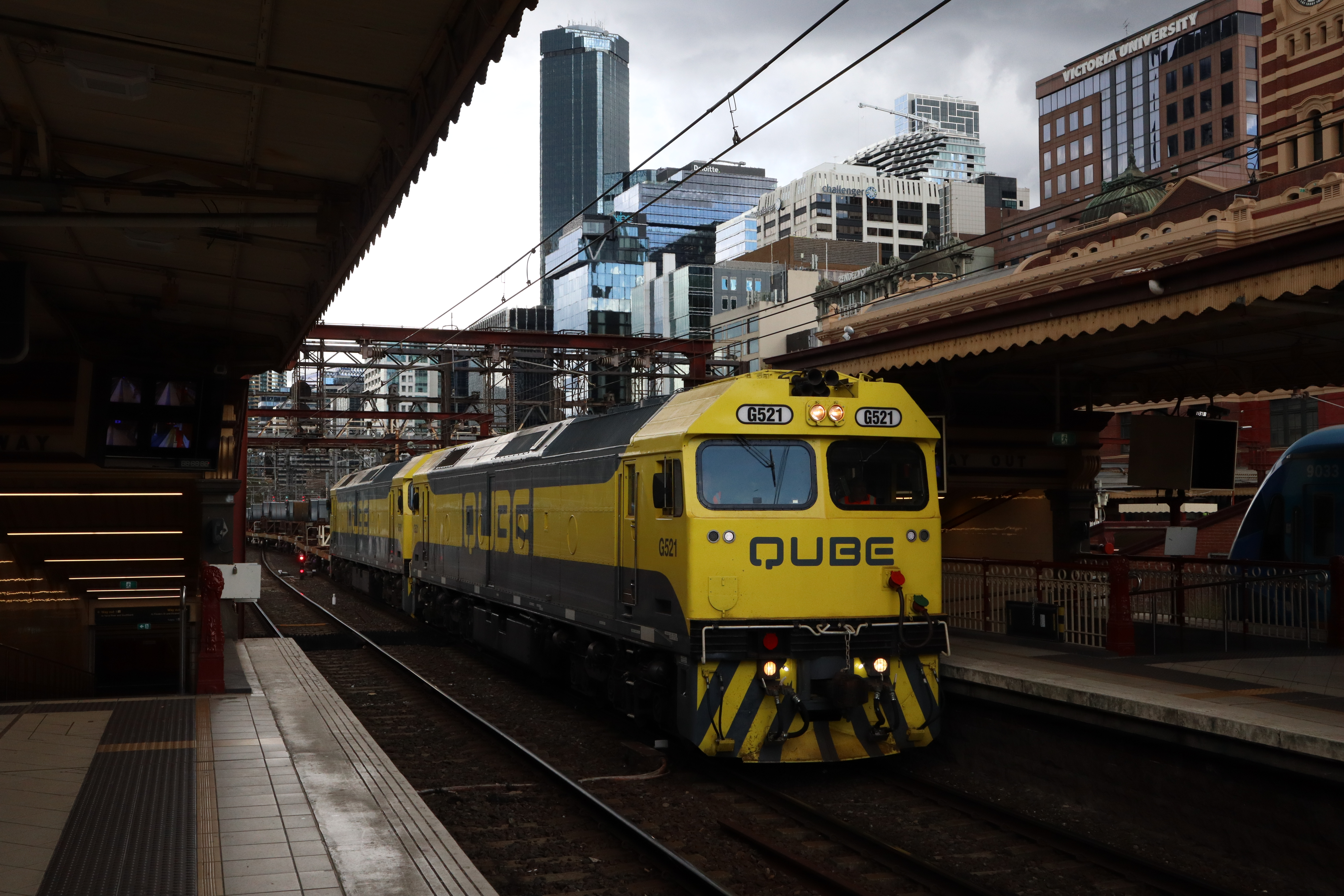
Qube Holdings's BlueScope steel train towards Long Island in May 2022

Freight operations occur (usually) twice-daily, with Qube Holdings operating services to the Long Island steel mills and the Port of Hastings. Trains to Melbourne run approximately at 4 am and during the mid-afternoon, while trains from Melbourne run approximately at midnight and noon.

Train services on the Frankston line are also subjected to maintenance and renewal works, usually on selected Fridays and Saturdays. Shuttle bus services are provided throughout the duration of works for affected commuters.

==== Stopping patterns ====
Legend — Station Status

- ◼ Premium Station – Station staffed from first to last train
- ◻ Host Station – Usually staffed during morning peak, however this can vary for different stations on the network.

Legend — Stopping Patterns
Night Network services do not operate via the City Loop

- ● – All trains stop
- ◐ – Some services do not stop
- ▲ – Only inbound trains stop (trains operate counter-clockwise through the City Loop all day)
- ▼ – Only outbound trains stop
- | – Trains pass and do not stop

Frankston services
Station	Zone	Local	Ltd Express	Carrum	Mordialloc	Cheltenham	Shuttle
◼ Flinders Street	1	●	●	●	●	●	
◼Southern Cross	1	▲	▲	▲	▲	▲	
◼Flagstaff	1	▲	▲	▲	▲	▲	
◼Melbourne Central	1	▲	▲	▲	▲	▲	
◼Parliament	1	▲	▲	▲	▲	▲	
◼ Richmond	1	●	●	●	●	●	
◼ South Yarra	1	●	●	●	●	●	
Hawksburn	1	●	|	●	●	●	
Toorak	1	●	|	●	●	●	
◻ Armadale	1	●	|	●	●	●	
◻ Malvern	1	●	▲	●	●	●	
◼ Caulfield	1	●	●	●	●	●	
◻ Glen Huntly	1	●	|	●	●	●	
◻ Ormond	1/2	●	|	●	●	●	
McKinnon	1/2	●	|	●	●	●	
◼ Bentleigh	1/2	●	|	●	●	●	
Patterson	2	●	|	●	●	●	
◼ Moorabbin	2	●	|	●	●	●	
Highett	2	●	|	●	●	●	
◻ Southland	2	●	|	●	●	●	
◼ Cheltenham	2	●	●	●	●	●	
◼ Mentone	2	●	●	●	●		
Parkdale	2	●	●	●	●		
◼ Mordialloc	2	●	●	●	●		▼
Aspendale	2	●	●	●			▼
Edithvale	2	●	●	●			▼
Chelsea	2	●	●	●			▼
Bonbeach	2	●	●	●			▼
◼ Carrum	2	●	●	●			▼
Seaford	2	●	●				▼
Kananook	2	●	●				▼
◼ Frankston	2	●	●				▼

=== Operators ===
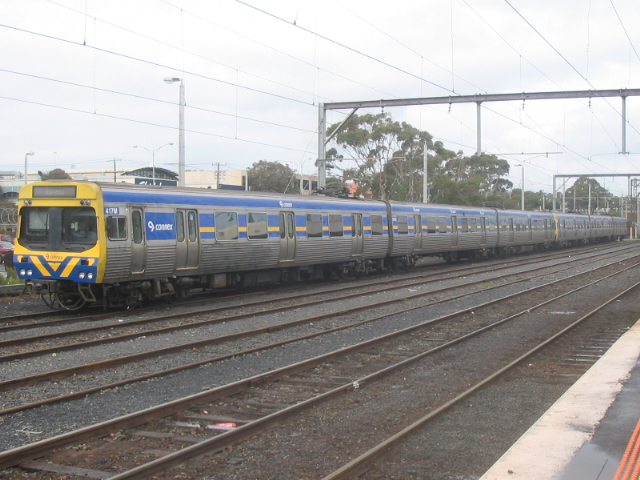
Connex Melbourne operated the line for 5 years from 2004 until 2009

The Frankston line has had a total of 7 operators since its opening in 1881. The majority of operations throughout its history have been government run: from its first service in 1881 until the 1999 privatisation of Melbourne's rail network, four different government operators have run the line. These operators, Victorian Railways, the Metropolitan Transit Authority, the Public Transport Corporation, and Bayside Trains have a combined operational length of 118 years.

Bayside Trains was privatised in August 1999 and later rebranded M>Train. In 2002, M>Train was placed into receivership and the state government regained ownership of the line, with KPMG appointed as receivers to operate M>Train on behalf of the state government. Two years later, rival train operator Connex Melbourne took over the M>Train operations including the Frankston line. Metro Trains Melbourne, the current private operator, then took over the operations in 2009. The private operators have had a combined operational period of 27 years.

Past and present operators of the Frankston line:
Operator	Assumed operations	Ceased operations	Length of operations
Victorian Railways	1881	1983	102 years
Metropolitan Transit Authority	1983	1989	6 years
Public Transport Corporation	1989	1998	9 years
Bayside Trains (government operator)	1998	1999	1 years
M>Train	1999	2004	5 years
Connex Melbourne	2004	2009	5 years
Metro Trains Melbourne	2009	incumbent	16 years (ongoing)

=== Route ===
Interactive map of the Frankston line in south-eastern Melbourne

Frankston (physical track)

Overview
- Status: Operational with passenger services from Flinders Street to Frankston and freight services to the Port of Hastings
- Owner: Victorian Railways (VR) (1882–1974); VR as VicRail (1974–1983); MTA (The Met) (1983–1989); PTC (The Met) (1989–1997); VicTrack (1997–Current)
- Locale: Melbourne, Victoria, Australia
- Termini: Frankston; Flinders Street
- Continues as: Stony Point line
- Connecting lines: All metropolitan, regional, and interstate
- Stations: 28 current stations; 2 former stations; 5 former sidings

Service
- Services: Frankston, Port of Hastings freight trains

History
- Work began: 19 December 1881
- Opened: Princes Bridge to Richmond on 8 February 1859; Richmond to Cremorne on 12 December 1859; Cremorne to South Yarra on 22 December 1860; Flinders Street to Princes Bridge on 18 December 1865; South Yarra to Caulfield on 2 April 1879; Caulfield to Mordialloc on 19 December 1881; Mordialloc to Frankston on 1 August 1882
- Completed: 1 August 1882
- Electrified: Flinders Street to South Yarra on 28 May 1919; To Glen Huntly on 5 March 1922; To Mordialloc on 6 June 1922; To Frankston on 27 August 1922

Technical
- Line length: 43.23 km (26.86 mi)
- Num of tracks: Twelve tracks: Flinders Street to Richmond; Six tracks: Richmond to South Yarra; Four tracks: South Yarra to Caulfield; Triple track: Caulfield to Moorabbin; Double track: Moorabbin to Frankston
- Track gauge: 1,600 mm (5 ft 3 in)
- Electrification: 1500 V DC overhead
- Operating speed: 95 km/h (59 mph) – Electric; 55 km/h (34 mph) – Diesel
- Signalling: Automatic block signalling
- Maximum incline: 1 in 42 (2.38%)

The Frankston line forms a somewhat linear route from the Melbourne central business district to its terminus in Frankston. The route is 42.7 kilometres (26.5 mi) long and is predominantly doubled tracked, however between Flinders Street station and Richmond, the track is widened to 12 tracks, narrowing to 6 tracks between Richmond and South Yarra before again narrowing to 4 tracks between South Yarra and Caulfield. After Caulfield station, the track again narrows to 3 tracks, which is remain till Moorabbin when the track narrows to two tracks. The centre track is signalled for bidirectional operation, allowing for express trains overtaking stopping trains in the peak direction. After changing from Werribee and Williamstown services at Flinders Street, Frankston line traverses mainly flat country with few curves and fairly minimal earthworks for most of the line. However, between South Yarra and Malvern, the rail corridor has been lowered into a cutting to eliminate level crossings, and between Malvern and Caulfield, the corridor has been raised on an embankment for the same reason. After Caulfield, the line formerly had numerous level crossings, however, all have now been abolished through numerous rail trenches and rail bridges. Remaining level crossings on the line will be removed by 2029 under other level crossing removal works.

The line follows the same alignment as the Cranbourne and Pakenham lines with the three services splitting onto different routes at Caulfield. The Frankston line continues on its south eastern alignment, whereas the Cranbourne and Pakenham lines takes an eastern alignment towards their final destinations. From Mentone, the line is never more than ~1 kilometre (0.6 mi) from the eastern shore of Port Phillip Bay, and runs alongside the Nepean Highway for much of its length. At Frankston station, electrified services terminate with Metro Trains operated diesel services continuing to Stony Point. Most of the rail line goes through built-up suburbs and some industrial areas, with small sections of the line passing through more open countryside, passing by open fields and farms.

=== Stations ===
The line serves 28 stations across the length of the line. The stations are a mix of elevated, lowered, underground, and ground level designs. Underground stations are present only in the City Loop, with the majority of elevated and lowered stations being constructed as part of level crossing removals. In 2023, Glen Huntly station was lowered as part of level crossing removal works. In 2025, Parkdale station was elevated, In 2026, Mordialloc was elevated with Highett, and Seaford stations being elevated from 2029 for similar works. Aspendale station will also be lowered from 2029.

Station	Image	Accessibility	Opened	Terrain	Train connections	Other connections
Parliament		Yes—step free access	22 January 1983	Underground	8 connections: * Alamein line; Belgrave line; Craigieburn line; Glen Waverley line; Hurstbridge line; Lilydale line; Mernda line; Upfield line	Trams Buses
Melbourne Central		Yes—step free access	24 January 1981	Underground	8 connections: * Alamein line; Belgrave line; Craigieburn line; Glen Waverley line; Hurstbridge line; Lilydale line; Mernda line; Upfield line	Trams Buses
Flagstaff		Yes—step free access	27 May 1985	Underground	8 connections: * Alamein line; Belgrave line; Craigieburn line; Glen Waverley line; Hurstbridge line; Lilydale line; Mernda line; Upfield line	Trams Buses
Southern Cross		Yes—step free access	17 January 1859	Ground level	25 connections: * Alamein line; Albury line; Ararat line; Ballarat line; Belgrave line; Bendigo line; Craigieburn line; Echuca line; Flemington Racecourse line; Geelong line; Gippsland line; Glen Waverley line; Hurstbridge line; Lilydale line; Maryborough line; Mernda line; NSW TrainLink Southern; Seymour line; Shepparton line; Swan Hill line; The Overland; Upfield line; Warrnambool line; Werribee line; Williamstown line	Trams Buses
Flinders Street		Yes—step free access	1854	Lowered	13 connections: * Alamein line; Belgrave line; Craigieburn line; Flemington Racecourse line; Gippsland line; Glen Waverley line; Hurstbridge line; Lilydale line; Mernda line; Sandringham line; Upfield line; Werribee line; Williamstown line	Trams Buses
Richmond		No—steep ramp	1859	Elevated	6 connections: * Alamein line; Belgrave line; Gippsland line; Glen Waverley line; Lilydale line; Sandringham line	Trams Buses
South Yarra		No—steep ramp	1860	Lowered	1 connection: * Sandringham line	Trams
Hawksburn		No—steep ramp	1889	Lowered		
Toorak		No—steep ramp	1879	Lowered		Trams Buses
Armadale		No—steep ramp	1879	Lowered		Trams Buses
Malvern		No—steep ramp	1879	Lowered	2 connections: Cranbourne line; Pakenham line	Trams
Caulfield		No—steep ramp	1879	Ground level	3 connections: Cranbourne line; Gippsland line; Pakenham line	Trams Buses
Glen Huntly		Yes—step free access	1881	Lowered		Trams
Ormond		Yes—step free access	1881	Lowered		Buses
McKinnon		Yes—step free access	1884	Lowered		Buses
Bentleigh		Yes—step free access	1881	Lowered		Buses
Patterson		Yes—step free access	1961	Elevated		
Moorabbin		No—steep ramp	1881	Lowered		Buses
Highett		Yes—step free access	1881	Ground level		Buses
Southland		Yes—step free access	2017	Ground level		Buses
Cheltenham		Yes—step free access	1881	Lowered		Buses
Mentone		Yes—step free access	1881	Lowered		Buses
Parkdale		Yes—step free access	1919	Ground level		Buses
Mordialloc		Yes—step free access	1881	Ground level		Buses
Aspendale		Yes—step free access	1891	Ground level		Buses
Edithvale		Yes—step free access	1919	Lowered		Buses
Chelsea		Yes—step free access	1907	Lowered		Buses
Bonbeach		Yes—step free access	1926	Lowered		
Carrum		Yes—step free access	1882	Elevated		Buses
Seaford		Yes—step free access	1913	Ground level		Buses
Kananook		Yes—step free access	1975	Ground level		Buses
Frankston		Yes—step free access	1882	Ground level	1 connection: Stony Point line	Buses

Station histories
Station	Opened	Closed	Age	Notes
Parliament	22 January 1983		43 years	
Melbourne Central	26 January 1981		45 years	Formerly Museum
Flagstaff	27 May 1985		41 years	
Southern Cross	17 January 1859		167 years	Formerly Batman's Hill; Formerly Spencer Street
Flinders Street	12 September 1854		172 years	Formerly Melbourne Terminus
Princes Bridge	8 February 1859	1 October 1866	7 years	
Princes Bridge	2 April 1879	30 June 1980	101 years	
Botanic Gardens	2 March 1859	c. April 1862	Approx. 3 years	
Punt Road	8 February 1859	12 December 1859	10 months	Replaced by Swan Street (200m further along line)
Richmond	12 December 1859		166 years	Formerly Swan Street
Cremorne	12 December 1859	c. 28 December 1863	Approx. 4 years	
South Yarra	22 December 1860		165 years	Formerly Gardiner's Creek Road
Hawksburn	7 May 1889		137 years	
Toorak	7 May 1879		147 years	
Armadale	7 May 1879		147 years	
Malvern	7 May 1879		147 years	
Caulfield	7 May 1879		147 years	
Glen Huntly	19 December 1881		144 years	Formerly Glen Huntly Road; Later Glen Huntly; Then Glenhuntly
Ormond	19 December 1881		144 years	Formerly North Road
McKinnon	1 September 1884		142 years	Formerly McKinnon Road
Bentleigh	19 December 1881		144 years	Formerly East Brighton
Patterson	28 May 1961		65 years	
Moorabbin	19 December 1881		144 years	Formerly South Brighton
Highett	19 December 1881		144 years	Formerly Highett Road
Southland	26 November 2017		8 years	
Cheltenham	19 December 1881		144 years	
Mentone	19 December 1881		144 years	Formerly Balcombe Road; Formerly Balcombe
Parkdale	1 September 1919		107 years	
Mordialloc	19 December 1881		144 years	
Aspendale	c. April 1891		Approx. 135 years	Formerly Aspendale Park Race-Course
Edithvale	20 September 1919		107 years	
Chelsea	4 February 1907		119 years	
Bonbeach	15 February 1926		100 years	
Carrum	1 August 1882		144 years	
Crystal Sand Siding	13 November 1923	6 November 1934	10 years	Formerly Carrum Sand Company siding
Monolyte Siding	c. 14 December 1914	c. 27 January 1919	Approx. 4 years	
McCulloch's Siding	22 January 1919	c. 2 February 1954	Approx. 35 years	
Kelvin's Siding	11 December 1911	27 January 1919	7 years	Formerly McCulloch and Lowe Siding
Albion Sand Siding	22 April 1912	25 February 1936	23 years	Formerly Battersea Siding
Seaford	1 December 1913		112 years	
Kananook	25 August 1975		51 years	
Frankston	1 August 1882		144 years	

== Infrastructure ==
=== Rolling stock ===
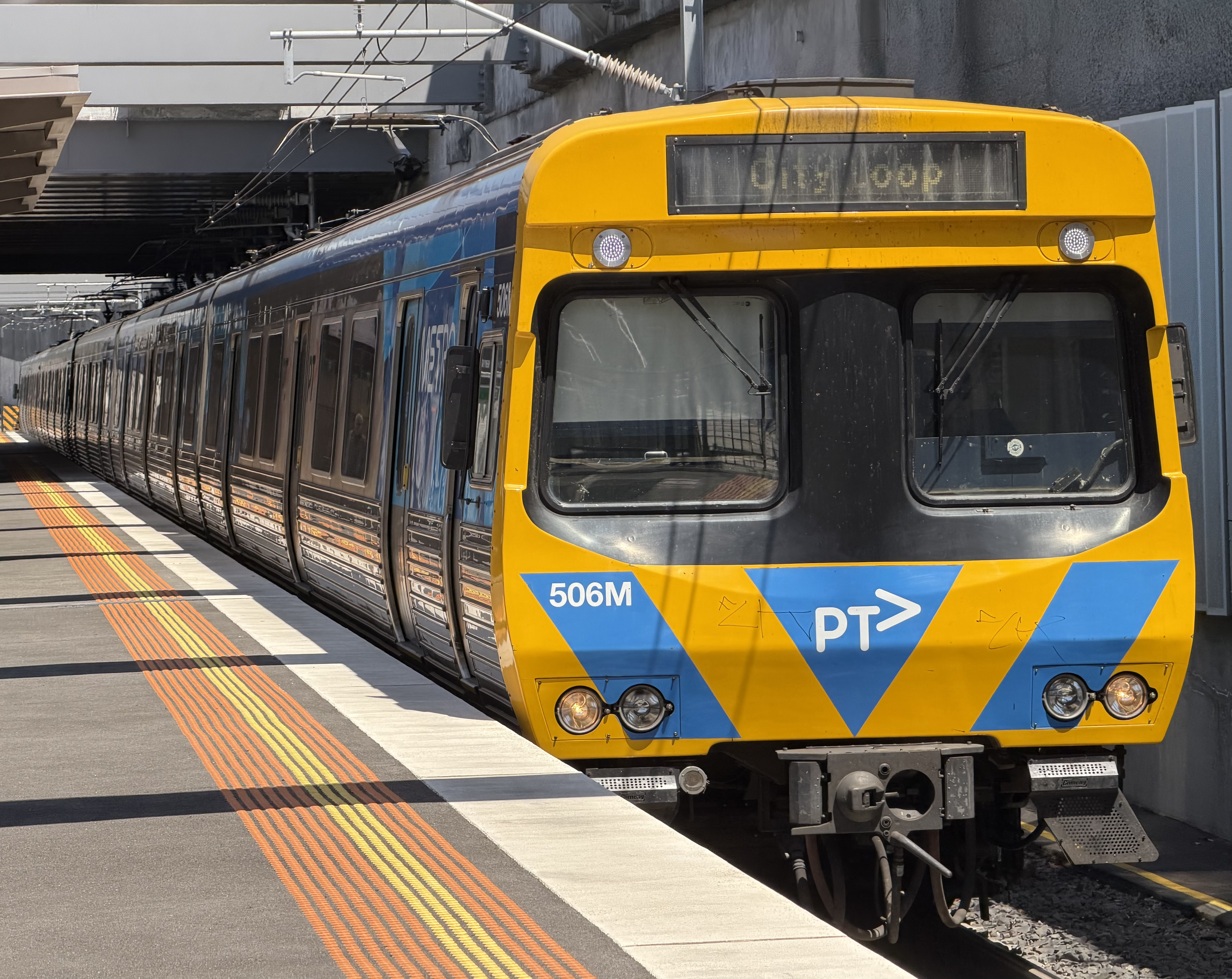
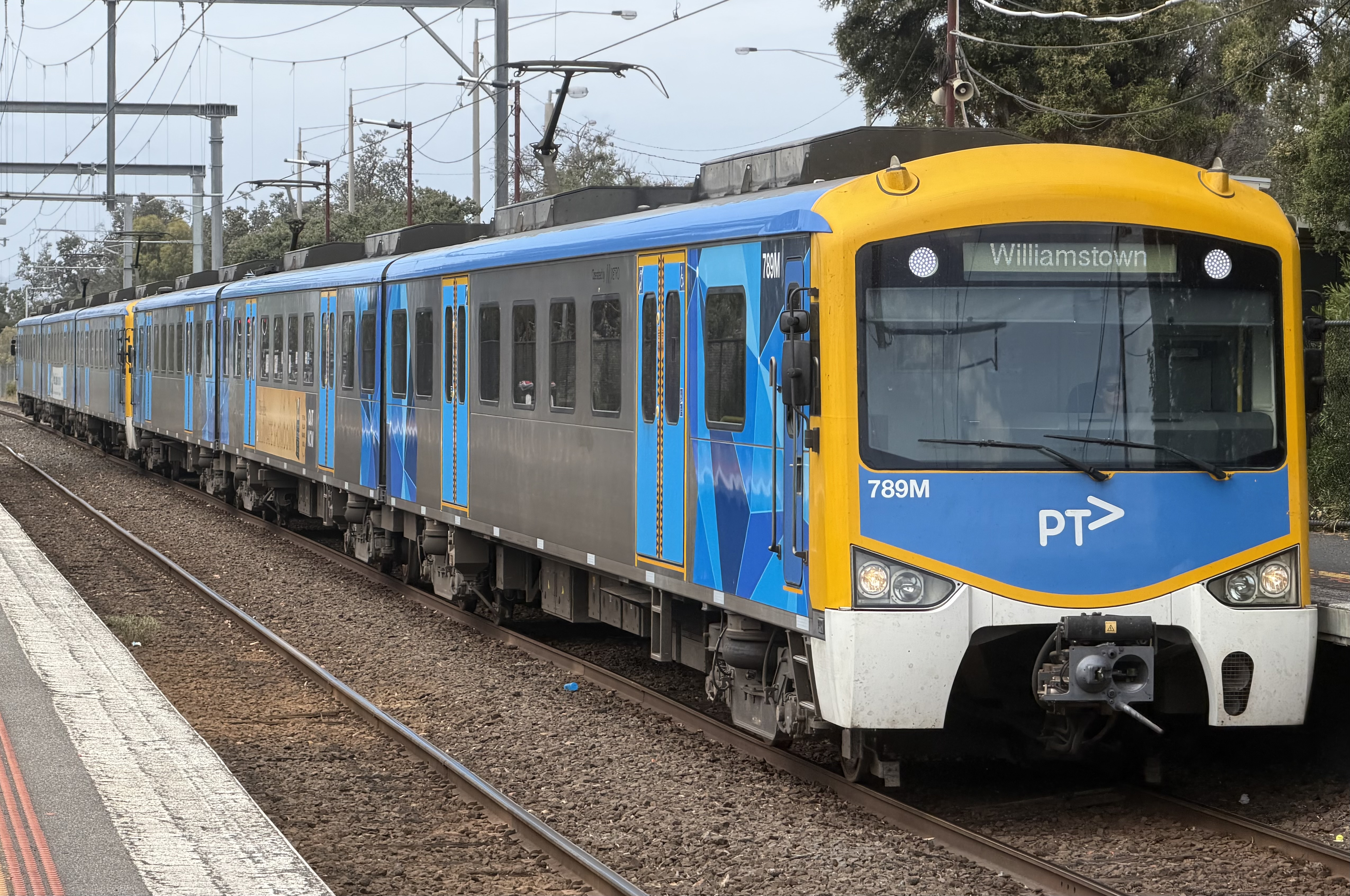
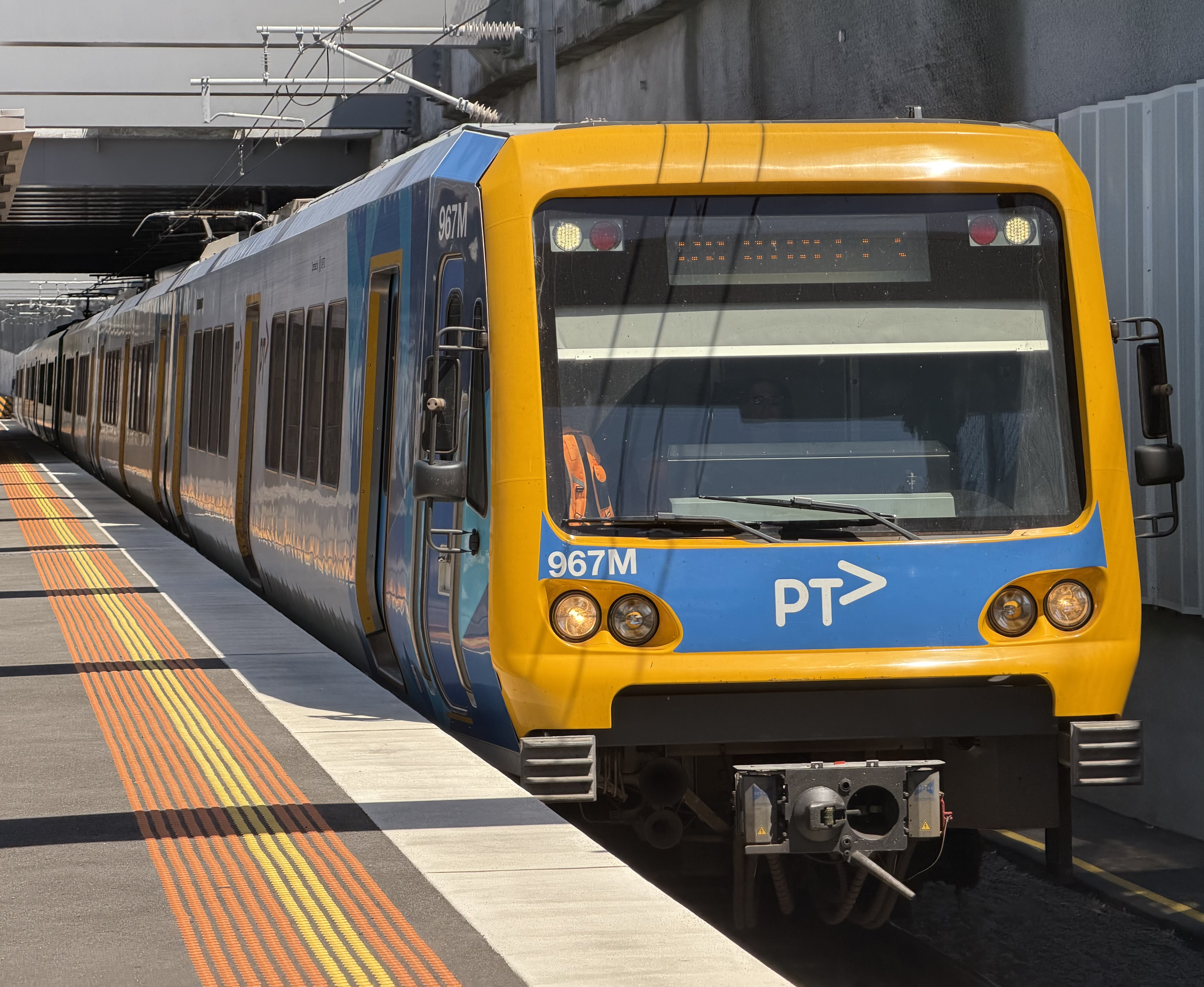
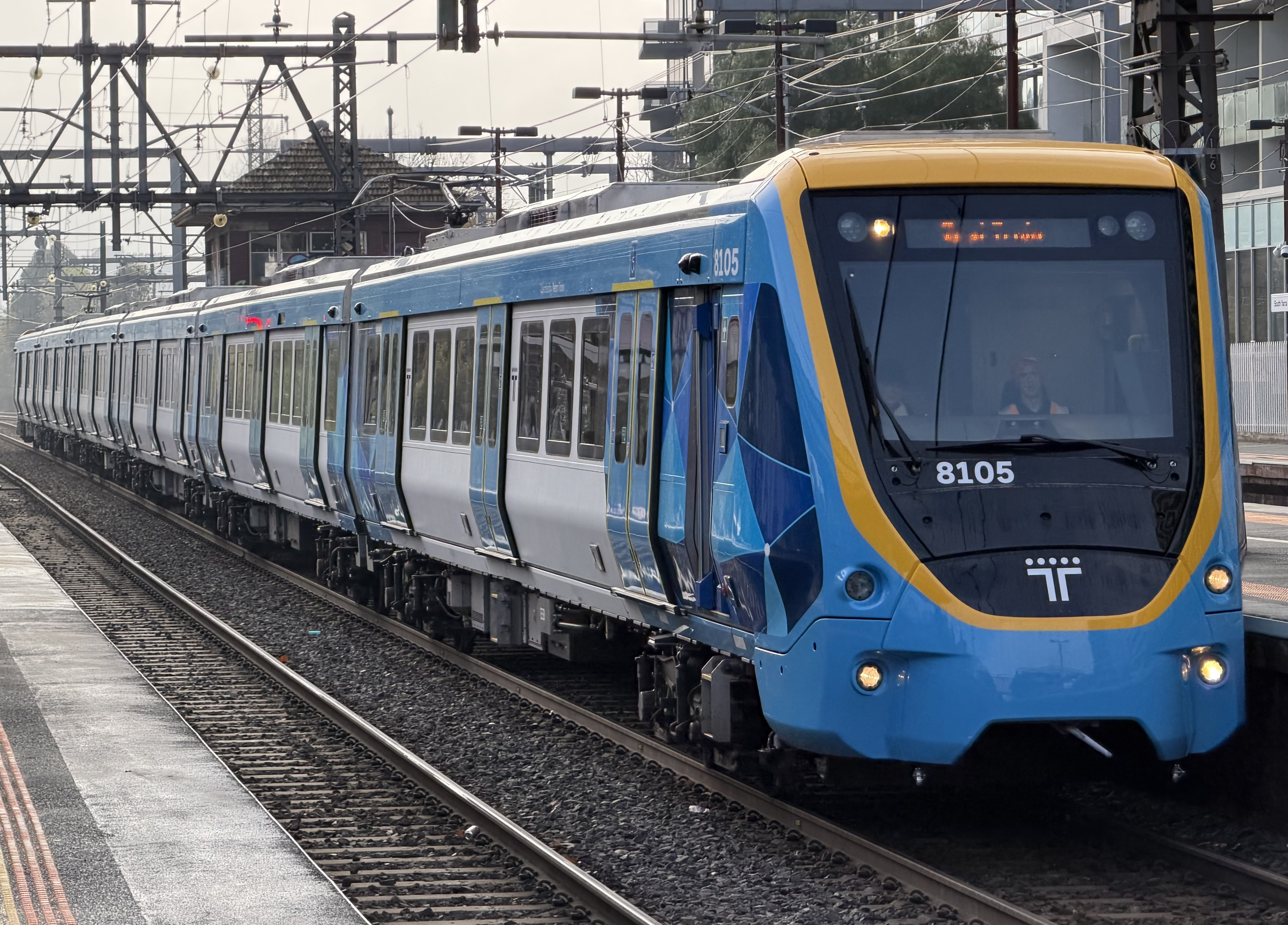
The Comeng, Siemens Nexas, X'Trapolis 100 and X'Trapolis 2.0 trains are the current types of trains used on the Frankston line

The Frankston line uses three different types of electric multiple unit (EMU) trains that are operated in a split six-car configuration, with three doors per side on each carriage. The primary rolling stock featured on the line is the Comeng EMUs, built by Commonwealth Engineering between 1981 and 1988. These train sets are the oldest on the Melbourne rail network and subsequently will be replaced by the mid-2030s. Siemens Nexas EMUs are also widely featured on the line, originally built between 2002 and 2005 these train sets feature more modern technology than the Comeng trains. The final type of rolling stock featured on the line is the X'Trapolis 100 built by Alstom between 2002 and 2004, and 2009 and 2020. All of these rolling stock models are widely used on other lines across the metropolitan network and work as the backbone of the network.

Services on the Frankston Line were supplemented by the X'Trapolis 2.0 trains in May 2026. The first of the X'Trapolis 2.0 trains entered service on 3 May 2026 with services beginning on the Frankston line shortly after. These trains feature new and upgraded passenger information systems to display relevant information about the train and its journey, designated bicycle storage areas, and 6 cars that are fully walk through.

Alongside the passenger trains, Frankston line tracks and equipment are maintained by a fleet of engineering trains. The four types of engineering trains are: the shunting train; designed for moving trains along non-electrified corridors and for transporting other maintenance locomotives, for track evaluation; designed for evaluating track and its condition, the overhead inspection train; designed for overhead wiring inspection, and the infrastructure evaluation carriage designed for general infrastructure evaluation. Most of these trains are repurposed locomotives previously used by V/Line, Metro Trains, and the Southern Shorthaul Railroad.

=== Accessibility ===
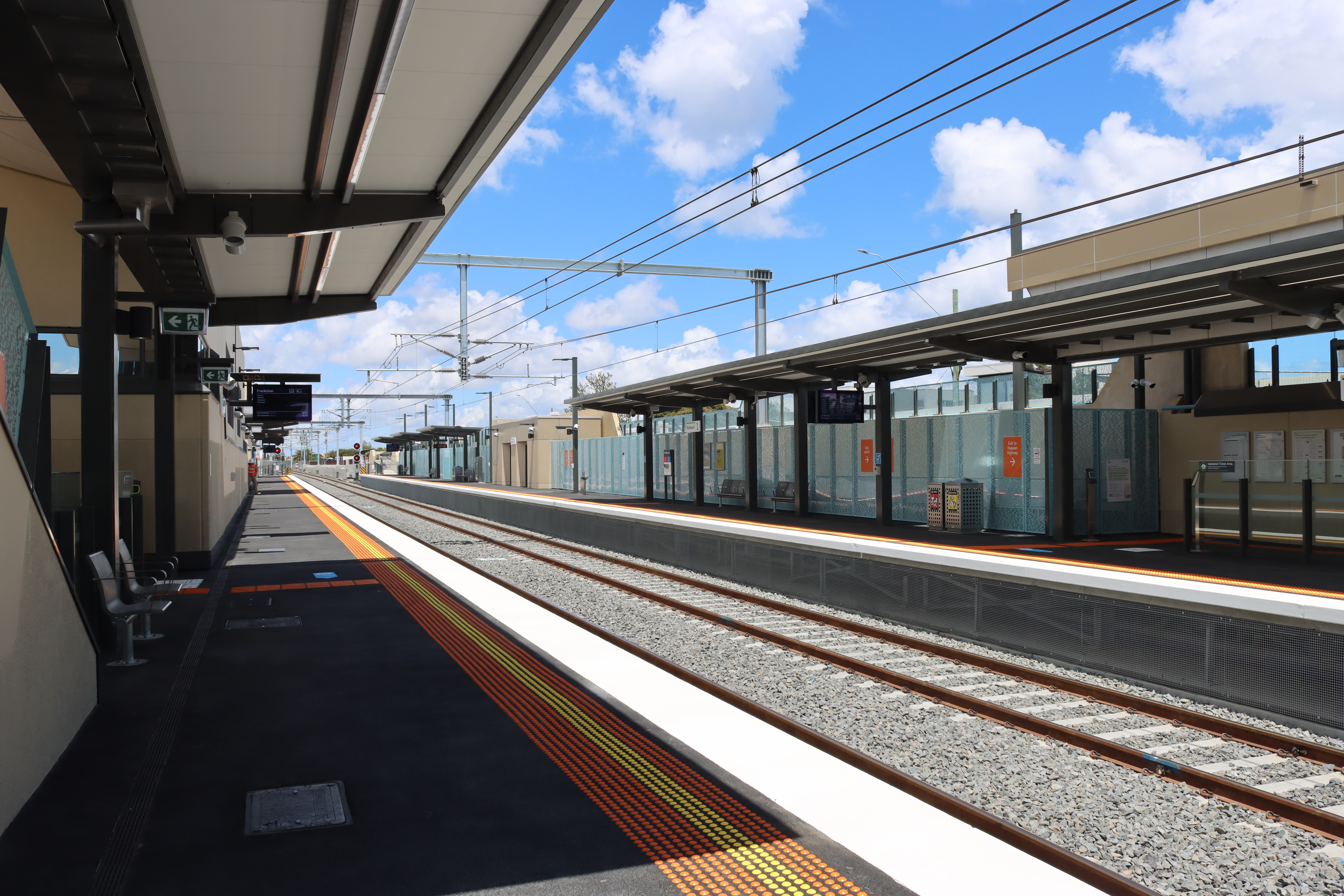
The rebuilt Bonbeach station has tactile boarding indicators and elevators

In compliance with the Disability Discrimination Act of 1992, all stations that are new-built or rebuilt are fully accessible and comply with these guidelines. The majority of stations on the corridor are fully accessible, however, some stations have not been upgraded. These stations do feature ramps, however, they have a gradient greater than 1 in 14. Stations that are fully accessible feature ramps that have a gradient less than 1 in 14, have at-grade paths, or feature lifts. These stations typically also feature tactile boarding indicators, independent boarding ramps, wheelchair accessible myki barriers, hearing loops, and widened paths.

Projects improving station accessibility have included the Level Crossing Removal Project, which involves station rebuilds and upgrades and other individual station upgrade projects. These works have made significant strides in improving network accessibility, with more than 68% of Frankston line stations classed as fully accessible. This number is expected to grow within the coming years with the completion of level crossing removal works on the corridor by 2029.

=== Signalling ===
The Frankston line uses three position signalling which is widely used across the Melbourne train network. Three position signalling was first introduced in 1915, with the final section of the line converted to the new type of signalling in 1976.
