= Cheltenham railway station, Melbourne =

Railway station in Melbourne, Australia

Cheltenham
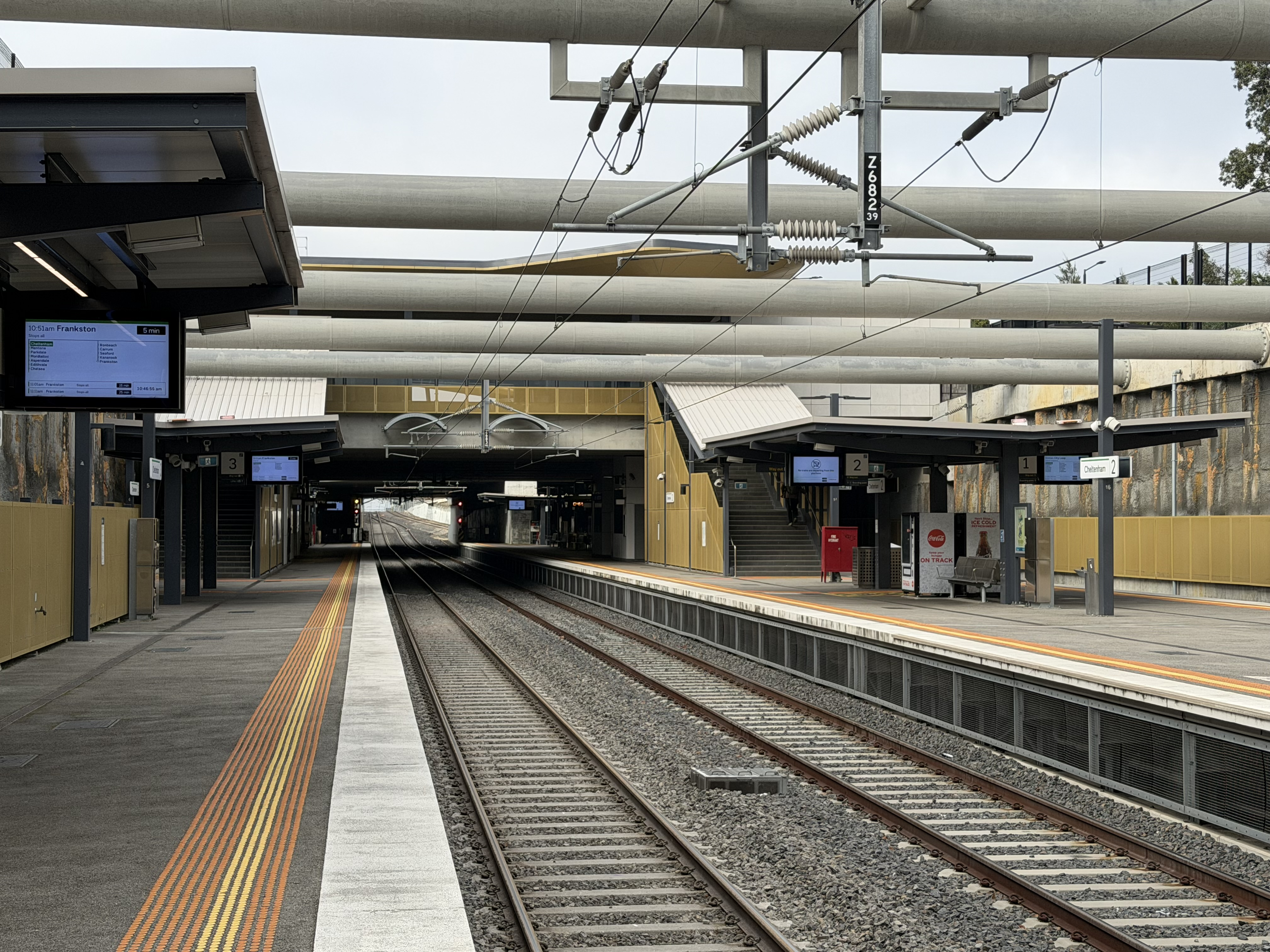
- Southbound view from Platform 3, June 2026

General information
- Location: Charman Road, Cheltenham, Victoria 3192; City of Bayside; City of Kingston; Australia
- Coordinates: 37°58′01″S 145°03′17″E
- System: PTV commuter rail station
- Owner: VicTrack
- Operator: Metro Trains
- Line: Frankston
- Distance: 22.43 kilometres from Southern Cross
- Platforms: 3 (1 island, 1 side)
- Tracks: 3
- Connections: Bus

Construction
- Structure type: Below ground
- Parking: 356
- Cycle facilities: Yes
- Accessible: Yes—step free access

Other information
- Status: Operational, premium station
- Station code: CTM
- Fare zone: Myki zone 2
- Website: Public Transport Victoria

History
- Opened: 19 December 1881; 144 years ago
- Rebuilt: 16 August 2020 (LXRP)
- Electrified: June 1922 (1500 V DC overhead)

Passengers
- 2005–2006: 1,051,110
- 2006–2007: 1,114,774 ▲6.05%
- 2007–2008: 1,221,956 ▲9.61%
- 2008–2009: 1,361,905 ▲11.45%
- 2009–2010: 1,402,813 ▲3%
- 2010–2011: 1,286,161 ▼8.31%
- 2011–2012: 1,129,856 ▼12.15%
- 2012–2013: Not measured
- 2013–2014: 962,774 ▼14.78%
- 2014–2015: 957,892 ▼0.5%
- 2015–2016: 901,822 ▼5.85%
- 2016–2017: 900,032 ▼0.19%
- 2017–2018: 903,698 ▲0.4%
- 2018–2019: 823,386 ▼8.88%
- 2019–2020: 454,850 ▼44.75%
- 2020–2021: 233,800 ▼48.59%
- 2021–2022: 319,800 ▲36.78%
- 2022–2023: 450,000 ▲40.71%
- 2023–2024: 629,500 ▲39.89%
- 2024–2025: 717,500 ▲13.98%

Services
Preceding station	Metro Trains	Following station
Southland towards Flinders Street via City Loop	Frankston line	Mentone towards Frankston
Caulfield towards Flinders Street via City Loop	Frankston line Weekday peak express services	Mentone towards Frankston
Track layout
Location

Cheltenham station is a railway station operated by Metro Trains Melbourne on the Frankston line, part of the Melbourne rail network. It serves the south-eastern suburb of Cheltenham, in Melbourne, Victoria, Australia. Cheltenham station is a below ground premium station, featuring three platforms, an island platform with two faces and one side platform. It opened on 19 December 1881, with the current station provided in August 2020.

== History ==
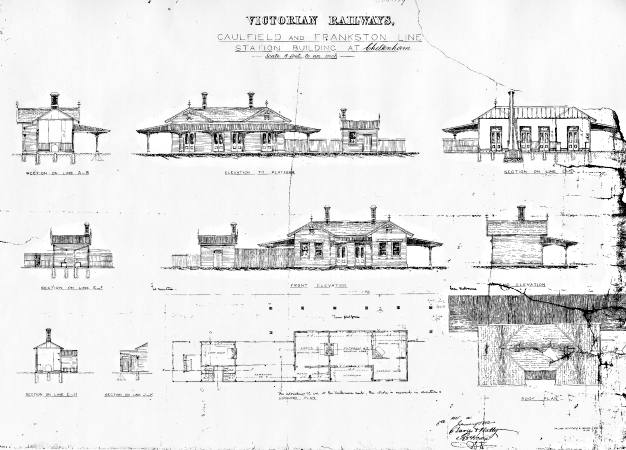
Drawings of the Cheltenham railway station building, c. 1881

Cheltenham station opened on 19 December 1881, and was one of the earliest stations on the Frankston line. Like the suburb itself, the station was named after the Cheltenham Inn, which was opened by Charles Whorral in 1853. Whorral named the inn after his home town in Cheltenham, Gloucestershire, England.

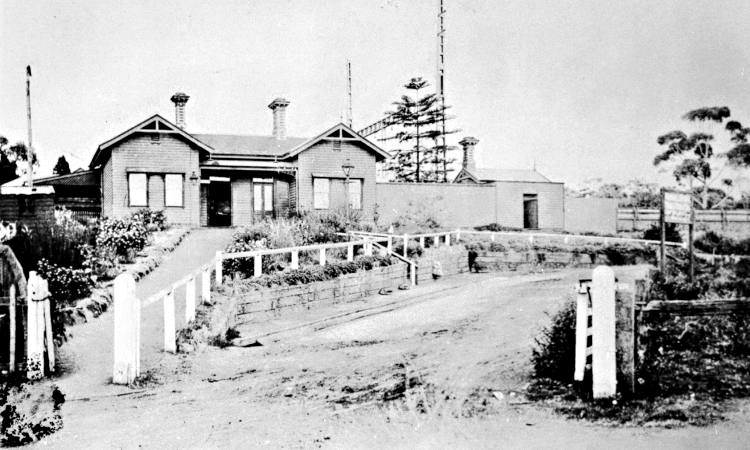
Cheltenham railway station building and entrance, c. 1920

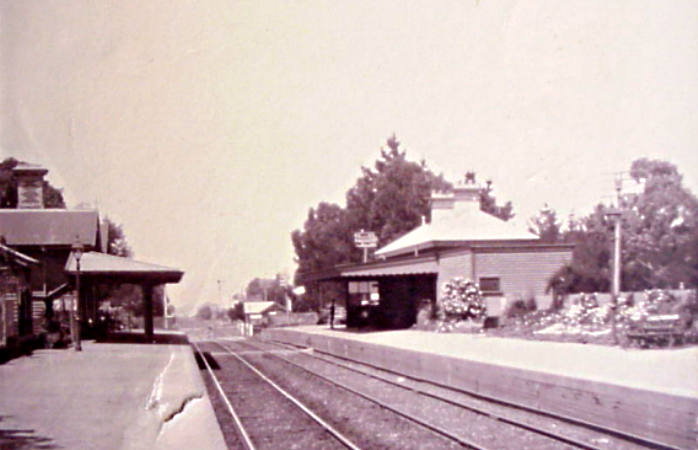
Cheltenham railway station platforms, c. 1920

In 1956, the former dock platform (Platform 1) was provided. A siding originally existed at this dock platform.

In 1966, boom barriers were provided at the former Park Road level crossing, which was located at the up (Melbourne) end of the station. In 1972, a signal panel was installed in the station building to control trains terminating at Platform 1. It coincided with the introduction of automatic signalling between Highett and Cheltenham. Also in that year, boom barriers were provided at the former Charman Road level crossing, which was located at the down (Frankston) end of the station.

In the early 1980s, a fourth track was laid into the bitumen of the former Park Street level crossing in preparation for triplication. However, triplication was only extended to Moorabbin in 1987.

There was previously a siding on the eastern side of the station, at the up end. By 1980, the wiring for the siding was deactivated, when most of the siding was replaced with car parking, and was removed altogether by 1985.

On 8 March 1996, Cheltenham was upgraded to a premium station.

In 2010, Cheltenham was identified as a key part of the Cheltenham Major Activity Centre by the Brumby Labor Government, as part of its Melbourne 2030 strategic planning policy framework. In that year, Kingston City Council proposed a major redevelopment of the station environs, including a new station forecourt with a terraced plaza, giving more prominence to the heritage-listed buildings at the station, and a new taxi rank, similar to that at Mentone. However, the proposal was not implemented.

In October 2015, the station toilets underwent a refurbishment.

From its opening in 1881, the station was located between Mentone and Highett. The opening of Southland in 2017 meant that Southland replaced Highett as the closest station to Cheltenham in the up direction.

In February 2017, it was announced that, as part of the Level Crossing Removal Project of the Andrews Labor Government, Cheltenham would be rebuilt in a rail trench, to allow the elimination of the level crossings at Charman and Park Roads. The trench, 1.26 kilometres (0.78 mi) in length and 30 metres (98 ft) wide, facilitated the reinstatement of the dock platform (Platform 1) as part of a duplication of the down track. Road bridges were constructed over the rail line at Charman and Park Roads, and the previous car park was replaced with a multi–storey car park. On 16 August 2020, the rebuilt station opened in the trench, and a new station building constructed on a deck across the railway line. The former station building on Platforms 1 and 2 was later donated to the Mornington Railway Preservation Society. In 2026, the former station building on Platform 3 was donated to Bayside City Council and erected at Cheltenham Recreation Reserve as part of an upgrade to facilities including a playground.

=== Incidents ===
On 10 May 2008, former The Saddle Club actress Jessica Jacobs was fatally hit by a train at Cheltenham after stumbling off the city-bound platform. On 16 March 2012, a motorist was killed after a train hit his car at the former Charman Road level crossing.

== Platforms and services ==
Cheltenham is serviced by Metro Trains' Frankston line services. Until March 2020, it had two side platforms and one dock platform. The latter was served by one afternoon terminating service from Flinders Street, that returned empty to the city, but from 12 October 2014, extra weekday Flinders Street bound services began to use the platform.

Following the reconstruction and reconfiguration of the station and tracks, as of July 2020, Platform 1 has been turned into a through track, servicing all Flinders Street trains. Platform 3 services the majority of Frankston bound trains, while Platform 2 now has the flexibility to allow services to terminate and return to Flinders St or continue to Frankston if required.

Cheltenham platform arrangement
Platform	Line	Destination	Via	Service Type	Notes	Source
1	Frankston line	Flinders Street	City Loop	All stations and limited express services	Typical platform for services to Flinders Street.	
2	Frankston line	Flinders Street	City Loop	All stations	Services to Flinders Street from this platform only operate on weekdays.	
3	Frankston line	Carrum or Frankston		All stations		

== Transport links ==
Kinetic Melbourne operates three bus routes via Cheltenham station, under contract to Public Transport Victoria:

- 600 : Westfield Southland – St Kilda station
- 922 : Westfield Southland – St Kilda station
- 923 : Westfield Southland – St Kilda station

Ventura Bus Lines operates four routes via Cheltenham station, under contract to Public Transport Victoria:

- 811 : Dandenong station – Brighton
- 812 : Dandenong station – Brighton
- 822 : Chadstone Shopping Centre – Sandringham station
- 828 : Hampton station – Berwick station
