= Brunswick railway station, Melbourne =

Railway station in Melbourne, Australia

Brunswick
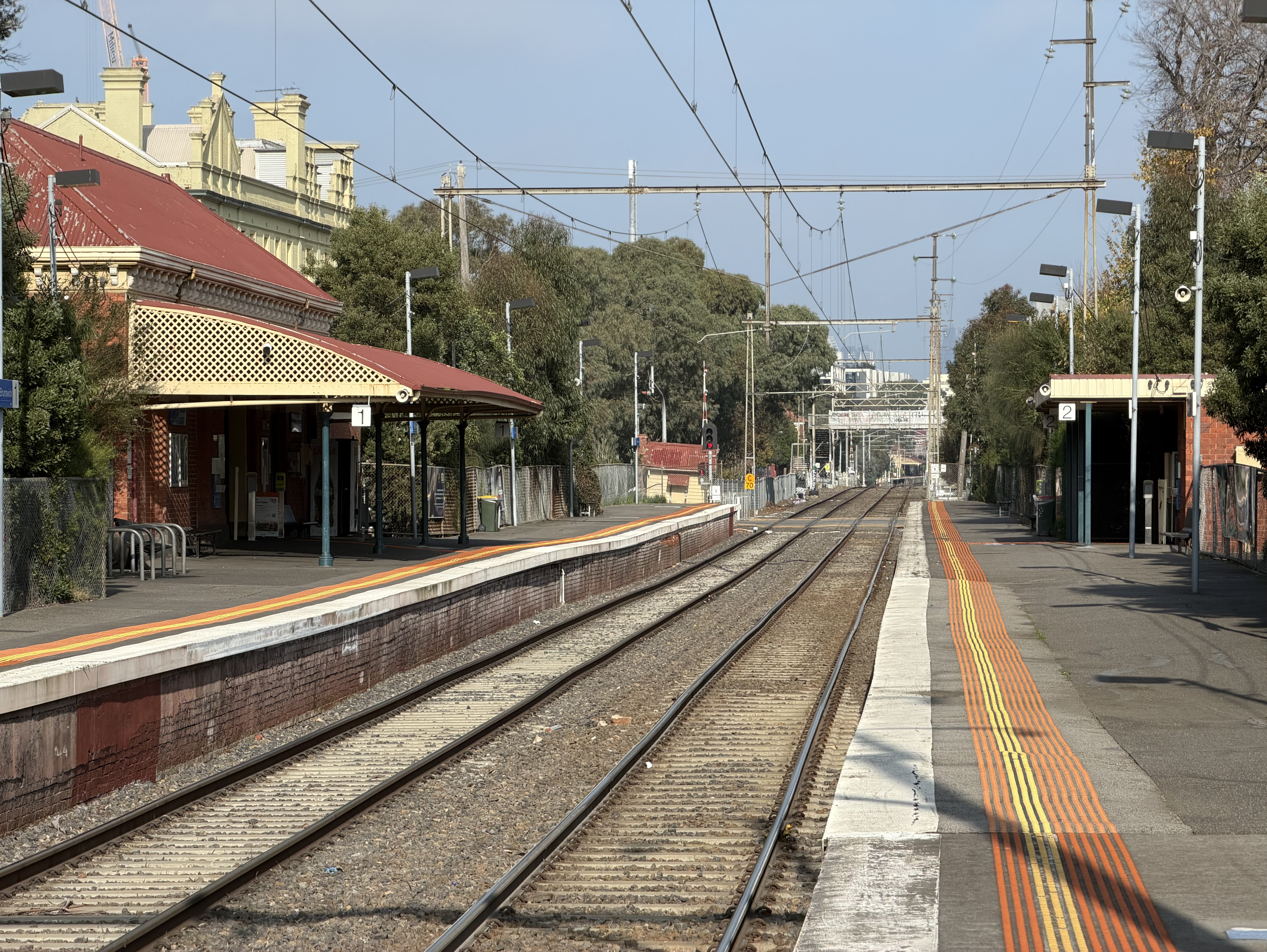
- Southbound view from Platform 2, June 2026

General information
- Location: Wilkinson Street, Brunswick, Victoria 3056; City of Merri-bek; Australia
- Coordinates: 37°46′04″S 144°57′35″E
- System: PTV commuter rail station
- Owner: VicTrack
- Operator: Metro Trains
- Line: Upfield
- Distance: 7.31 kilometres from Southern Cross
- Platforms: 2 side
- Tracks: 2
- Connections: Bus; Tram

Construction
- Structure type: Ground
- Parking: Yes
- Cycle facilities: Yes
- Accessible: Yes—step-free access

Other information
- Status: Operational, unstaffed
- Station code: BWK
- Fare zone: Myki zone 1
- Website: Public Transport Victoria

History
- Opened: 9 September 1884; 142 years ago
- Electrified: 1500 V DC overhead (December 1920)

Passengers
- 2005–2006: 201,458
- 2006–2007: 221,333 ▲9.86%
- 2007–2008: 239,699 ▲8.29%
- 2008–2009: 269,396 ▲12.38%
- 2009–2010: 302,548 ▲12.3%
- 2010–2011: 299,091 ▼1.14%
- 2011–2012: 286,981 ▼4.05%
- 2012–2013: Not measured
- 2013–2014: 348,470 ▲21.43%
- 2014–2015: 353,748 ▲1.51%
- 2015–2016: 357,322 ▲1.01%
- 2016–2017: 370,309 ▲3.63%
- 2017–2018: 377,805 ▲2.02%
- 2018–2019: 395,250 ▲4.62%
- 2019–2020: 304,300 ▼23%
- 2020–2021: 155,350 ▼48.9%
- 2021–2022: 167,400 ▲7.75%
- 2022–2023: 234,900 ▲40.32%
- 2023–2024: 326,950 ▲39.19%
- 2024–2025: 350,600 ▲7.23%

Services
Preceding station	Metro Trains	Following station
Jewell towards Flinders Street	Upfield line	Anstey towards Upfield
Track layout
Location

Brunswick station is a railway station operated by Metro Trains Melbourne on the Upfield line, part of the Melbourne rail network. It serves the northern suburb of Brunswick in Melbourne, Victoria, Australia. Brunswick station is a ground-level unstaffed station, featuring two side platforms. It opened on 9 September 1884.

== History ==
Brunswick station opened when the railway line from North Melbourne was extended to Coburg. Like the suburb itself, the station was named after Brunswick Park, a property that was purchased by Thomas Wilkinson and a partner. Brunswick Park was named in honour of either Princess Caroline of Brunswick, or the 1840 marriage of Queen Victoria to Prince Albert, of the royal house of Brunswick.

Brunswick had a goods yard which closed in 1966. The goods siding and associated points and signal discs were abolished in that same year. In 1972, the station platforms were lengthened.

Just after 4:45am on 2 August 1977, a seven-car Harris train set rolled away from Gowrie, after the driver and guard were changing ends after taking the train out of a siding, because it was scheduled to operate a city-bound service from Upfield. The train passed through fifteen level crossings and destroyed seven sets of hand gates, before stopping just south of Brunswick, between the Albert and Dawson Streets level crossings.

In 1998, boom barriers replaced hand gates at the Albert Street level crossing, at the up end of the station, and replaced interlocked gates at the Victoria Street level crossing, at the down end of the station. The signal box protecting Victoria Street was also abolished during that time.

=== Heritage listing ===
The former Coburg railway line was added to the Victorian Heritage Register on 23 October 1997 in recognition of its historical significance. The heritage curtail is extensive that includes seven distinct precincts that contain nineteenth century station buildings and platforms at Coburg, Moreland, Jewell, and Brunswick, substations, signal boxes, gatekeepers cabins, remnant interlocking and safe-working equipment, levers and rodding, signals, gates and industrial sidings.

The station was added to the now defunct Register of the National Estate on an unknown date.

== Future ==
The station is slated for closure or relocation under the Level Crossing Removal Project. The project intends to remove the adjacent Albert St and Victoria Street level crossings, as well as six other level crossings in Brunswick, by grade separation to become an elevated. Under the plan, announced in 2024 and expected to be completed in 2030, the three nearby stations of Jewell, Brunswick and Anstey will be replaced by two new stations, each located about 450 metres (1,480 ft) from the existing Brunswick station: the new southern station is planned to be located next to Union Street and Dawson Street, while the new northern station is planned to be located next to Hope Street. The heritage listed Brunswick station building on Platform 1 at the existing station and some heritage listed interlocking hand gates at some closed level crossings will be kept and located at its current spot.

The decision to build two stations in different locations instead of rebuilding Jewell, Brunswick and Anstey generated criticism from residents and the local council. Local newspaper Brunswick Voice reported that the Minister for Transport Infrastructure, Danny Pearson, claimed "the decision to build two stations followed 18 months of technical and engineering assessments which found fewer stations would boost capacity on the line in the future and deliver more open space", noting that "the government claimed the plan would also minimise the impact to heritage in the area, but the politician provided no detail about whether the three station buildings and the historic boom gate operators' cabins would be preserved".

== Platforms and services ==
Brunswick has two side platforms. It is served by Upfield line trains.

Brunswick platform arrangement
Platform	Line	Destination	Via	Service Type	Notes	Source
1	Upfield line	Flinders Street	City Loop	All stations	See City Loop for operating patterns	
2	Upfield line	Upfield		All stations		

== Transport links ==
Kinetic Melbourne operates two bus routes via Brunswick station, under contract to Public Transport Victoria:

- 508 : Alphington station – Moonee Ponds Junction
- 509 : Brunswick West – Barkly Square Shopping Centre

Ventura Bus Lines operates one route to and from Brunswick station, under contract to Public Transport Victoria:

- Night Bus 951 : to Glenroy station (Saturday and Sunday mornings only)

Yarra Trams operates one route via Brunswick station:

- : North Coburg – Flinders Street station (via Elizabeth Street)
