= Glenroy railway station =

Railway station in Melbourne, Australia

Glenroy
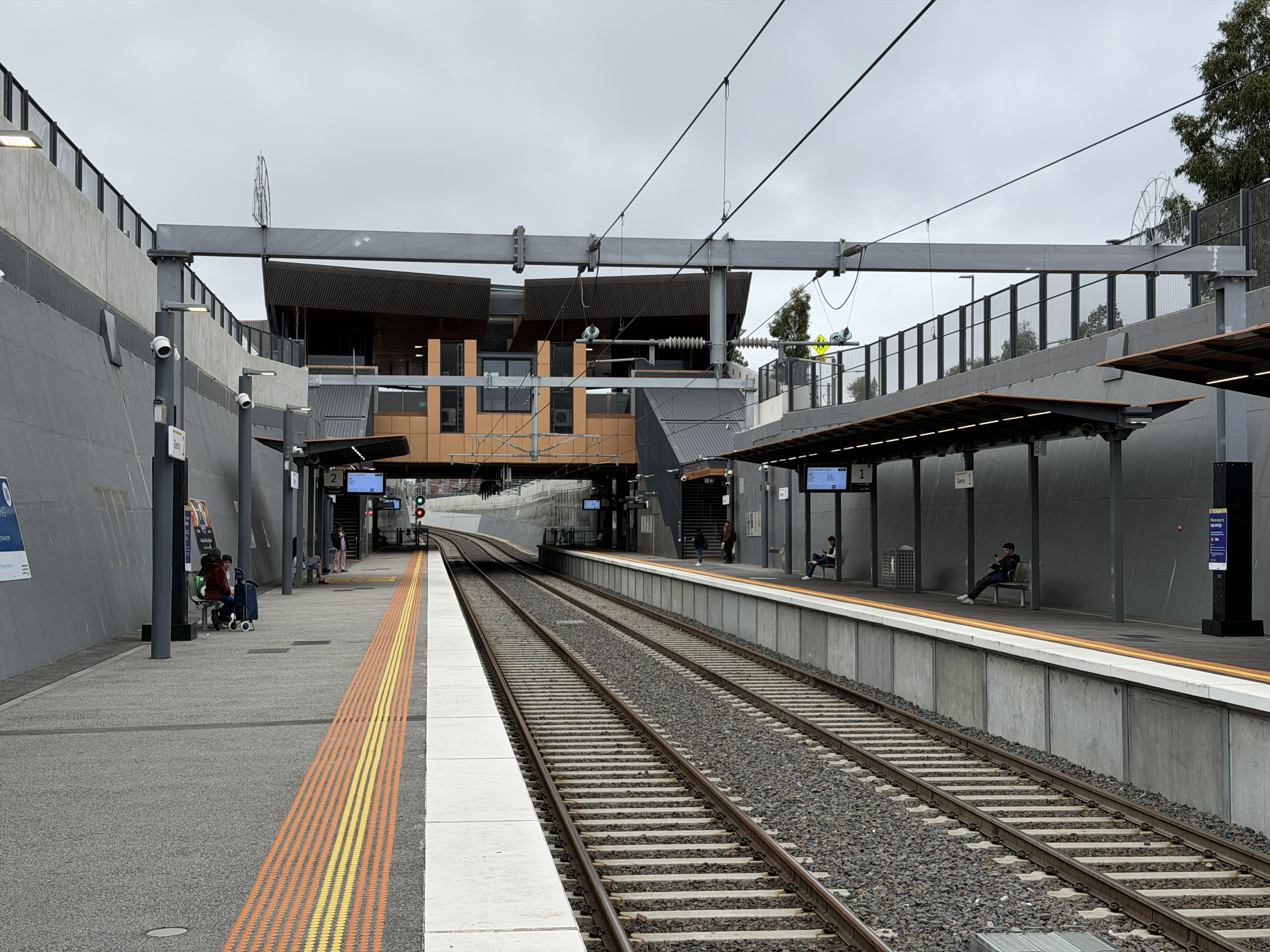
- Northbound view from Platform 2, April 2026

General information
- Location: Hartington Street, Glenroy, Victoria 3046; City of Merri-bek; Australia
- Coordinates: 37°42′17″S 144°55′02″E
- System: PTV commuter rail station
- Owner: VicTrack
- Operator: Metro Trains
- Line: Craigieburn
- Distance: 14.40 kilometres from Southern Cross
- Platforms: 2 side
- Tracks: 2
- Connections: Bus

Construction
- Structure type: Below ground
- Parking: 450
- Cycle facilities: 8
- Accessible: Yes – step free access

Other information
- Status: Operational, premium station
- Station code: GRY
- Fare zone: Myki zone 1/2
- Website: Public Transport Victoria

History
- Opened: 24 January 1887; 139 years ago
- Rebuilt: 1976; 6 May 2022 (LXRP)
- Electrified: September 1921 (1500 V DC overhead)

Passengers
2005–2018 numbers
2005–2006	939,308
2006–2007	1,008,479 ▲7.35%
2007–2008	1,126,716 ▲11.72%
2008–2009	1,295,025 ▲14.93%
2009–2010	1,383,916 ▲6.86%
2010–2011	1,351,289 ▼2.35%
2011–2012	1,290,348 ▼4.5%
2012–2013	Not measured
2013–2014	1,099,367 ▼14.8%
2014–2015	1,061,885 ▼3.4%
2015–2016	1,085,598 ▲2.23%
2016–2017	1,112,330 ▲2.46%
2017–2018	1,165,220 ▲4.75%
- 2018–2019: 1,193,185 ▲2.4%
- 2019–2020: 1,037,400 ▼13.05%
- 2020–2021: 399,100 ▼61.52%
- 2021–2022: 317,000 ▼20.57%
- 2022–2023: 626,050 ▲97.06%
- 2023–2024: 758,850 ▲21.21%
- 2024–2025: 740,900 ▼2.37%

Services
Preceding station	Metro Trains	Following station
Oak Park towards Flinders Street	Craigieburn line	Jacana towards Craigieburn
Track layout
Location

Glenroy station is a railway station operated by Metro Trains Melbourne on the Craigieburn line, part of the Melbourne rail network. It serves the northern suburb of Glenroy in Melbourne, Victoria, Australia. The station opened on 24 January 1887, with the former ground level station closed and demolished in April 2022 and the current lowered rail trench station provided in May 2022 by the Level Crossing Removal Project.

Glenroy is a below ground premium station, consisting of two side platforms connected by staircases, lifts and a ground level concourse. The station fully complies with the Disability Discrimination Act 1992 and is accessible, as there is a lift connecting to the ground level concourse and the station platforms on either side.

The station is served by bus routes 513, 514, 535, 536 and 542 as well as route 951. The station is approximately 15 km (9.3 mi) or around a 32 minute train ride to Flinders Street via the City Loop. The adjacent stations are Oak Park, up towards Flinders Street, and Jacana, down towards Craigieburn.

== Description ==
Glenroy station consists of two side platforms with two edges. As is standard in Melbourne, the platform has an asphalt surface with concrete on edges. The side platforms are approximately 160 m (524 ft 11 in) long, long enough for a 7 car High Capacity Metro Train. The station features a ground level concourse, accessible by stairs and lifts up to the elevated platforms. There is one main station building, opening in 2022, which contains a waiting room, a customer service, a PSO office and a ground level concourse inside the main station building. It is served by the Cragieburn line and has a 5-10 minute peak frequency and a 20-30 minute off-peak frequency.

The station building, concourse and platform largely stayed the same since the station was rebuilt in 2022. There are 600 parking spaces; 396 spaces on Dowd Place, 141 spaces on Hartington Street and 66 spaces on Station Road and 25 protected bike parking at the station. The station is listed as fully accessible on the Metro Trains website, as there are lifts and accessible features available at the station.

== History ==
Glenroy station opened on 24 January 1887, with the railway line past the site of the station opening in 1872, as part of the North East line to School House Lane. Like the suburb itself, the station is named after a pastoral run occupied by Duncan Cameron, who originated from Glen Roy, Scotland.

In 1908, a goods siding was provided and, in 1950, it was extended to a nearby flour mill. Hand gates protected the former Glenroy Road level crossing until 1957, when boom barriers were provided.

On 14 September 1973, Tait motor carriage 424M was destroyed by fire at the station. The original station buildings were provided in 1886 and, in 1976, were replaced with brick structures. In 1999, Glenroy was upgraded to a premium station, featuring the addition of customer service facilities and the conversion of the former ground-level station building into a waiting room.

The station was rebuilt for a second time by the Level Crossing Removal Project, due to the grade separation of the Glenroy Road level crossing. The level crossing was removed by lowering the railway line underneath Glenroy Road. Major construction began in late 2020 soon after and, on 6 May 2022, the rebuilt station opened.

== Platforms and services ==
Glenroy has two side platforms. The station is currently served by the Craigieburn line, part of the metropolitan railway network. The Craigieburn line runs from Craigieburn station, north of Melbourne, joining with the Upfield, Werribee and Williamstown lines near North Melbourne, before travelling through to Flinders Street via the City Loop in a clockwise direction during weekday morning peak hours, or all day on weekends and public holidays, and to Flinders Street via Southern Cross in an anti-clockwise direction during weekday afternoon and evening peak hours.

Glenroy platform arrangement
Platform	Line	Destination	Via	Service Type	Notes	Source
1	Craigieburn line	Flinders Street	City Loop	All stations	See City Loop for operating patterns	
2	Craigieburn line	Craigieburn		All stations		

== Transport links ==
Six bus routes via Glenroy station, under contract to Transport Victoria:

- 513 : to Eltham station (via Lower Plenty) (operated by Kinetic Melbourne)
- 514 : to Eltham station (via Greensborough) (operated by Kinetic Melbourne)
- 534 : to Coburg (operated by CDC Melbourne)
- 536 : to Gowrie station (operated by CDC Melbourne)
- 542 : Roxburgh Park station – Pascoe Vale station (operated by CDC Melbourne)
- Night Bus 951 : to Brunswick station (Saturday and Sunday mornings only) (operated by Ventura Bus Lines)

== Gallery ==
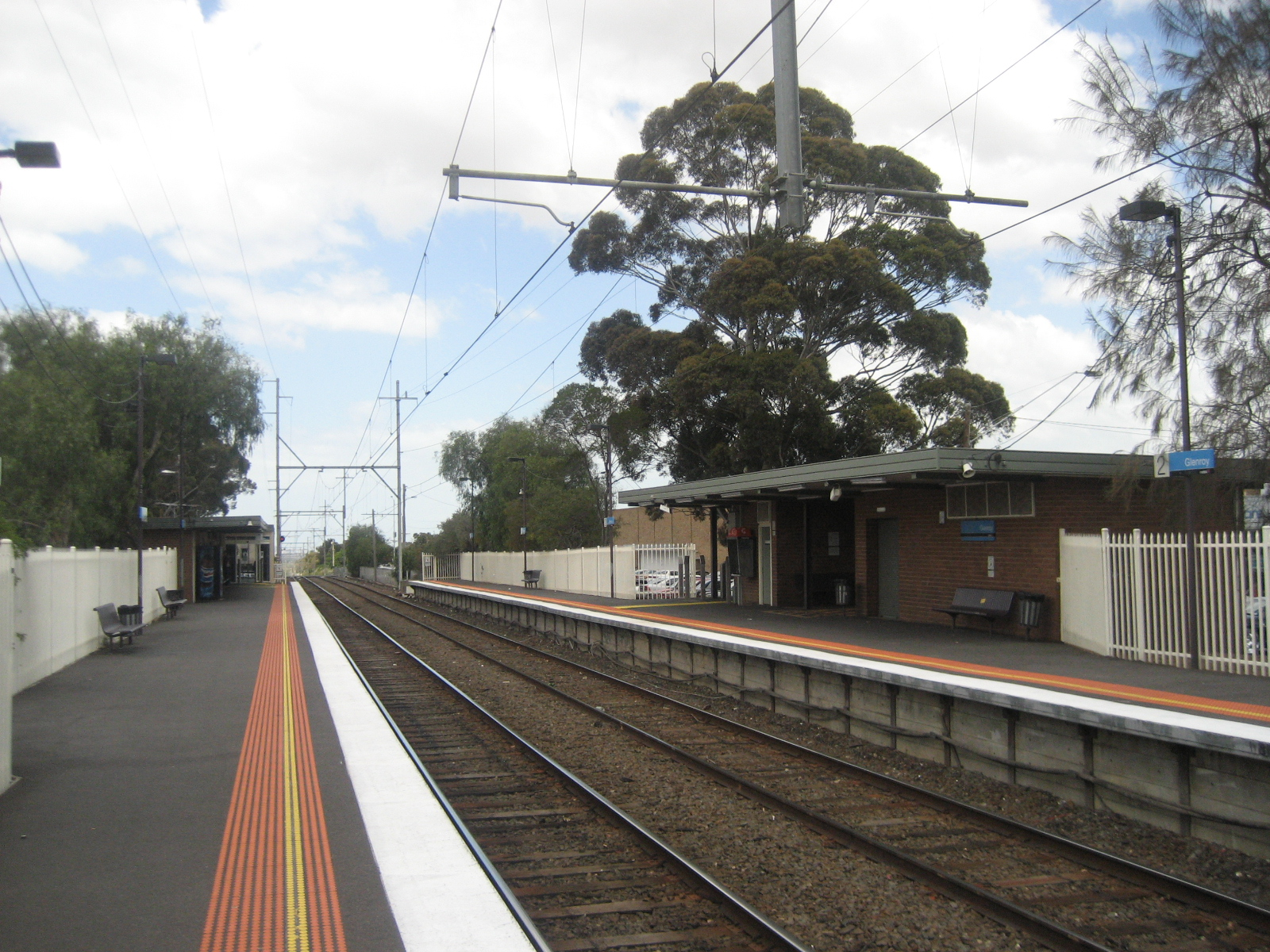
Southbound view from the former ground level Platform 1, November 2008

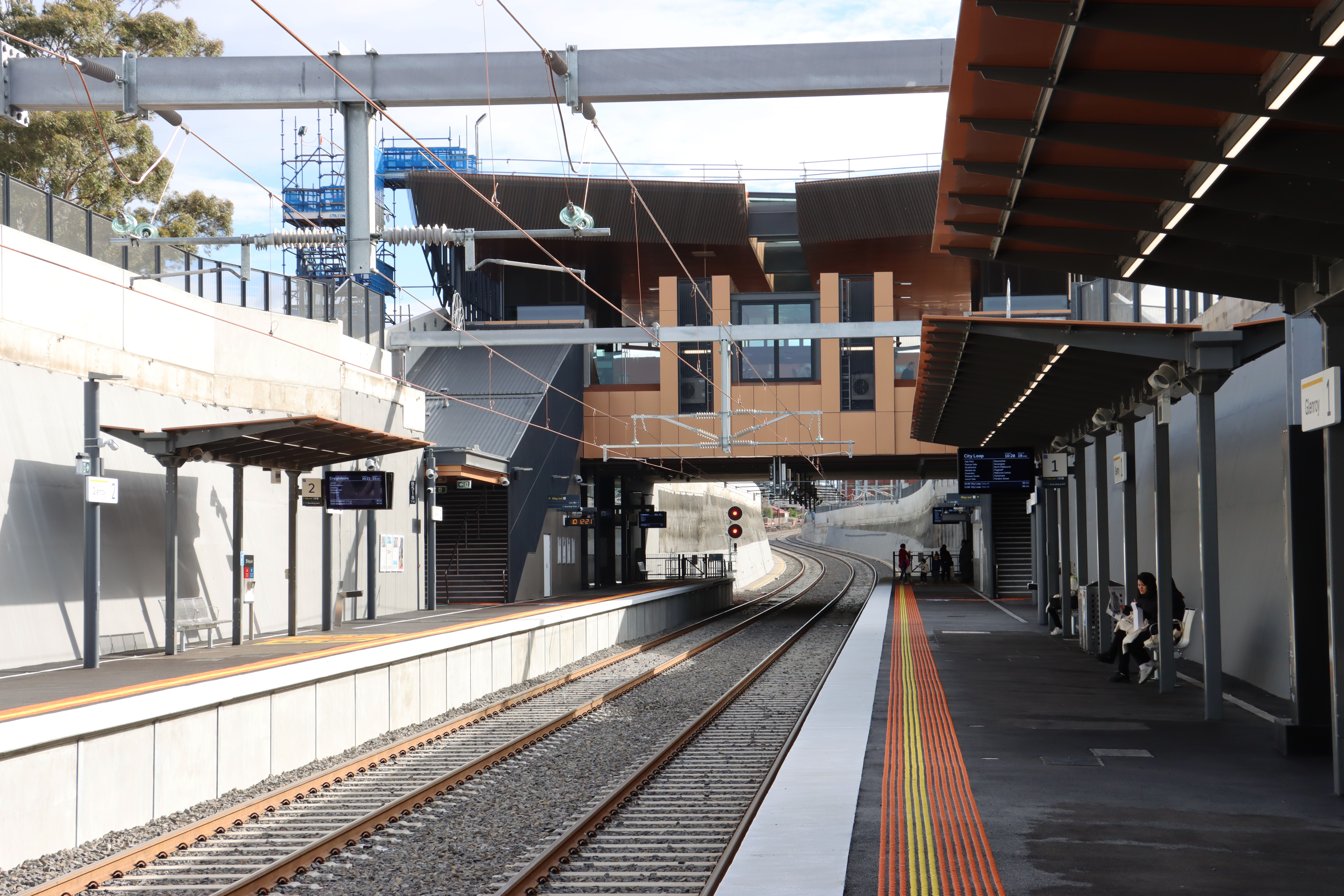
Northbound view from Platform 1, May 2022

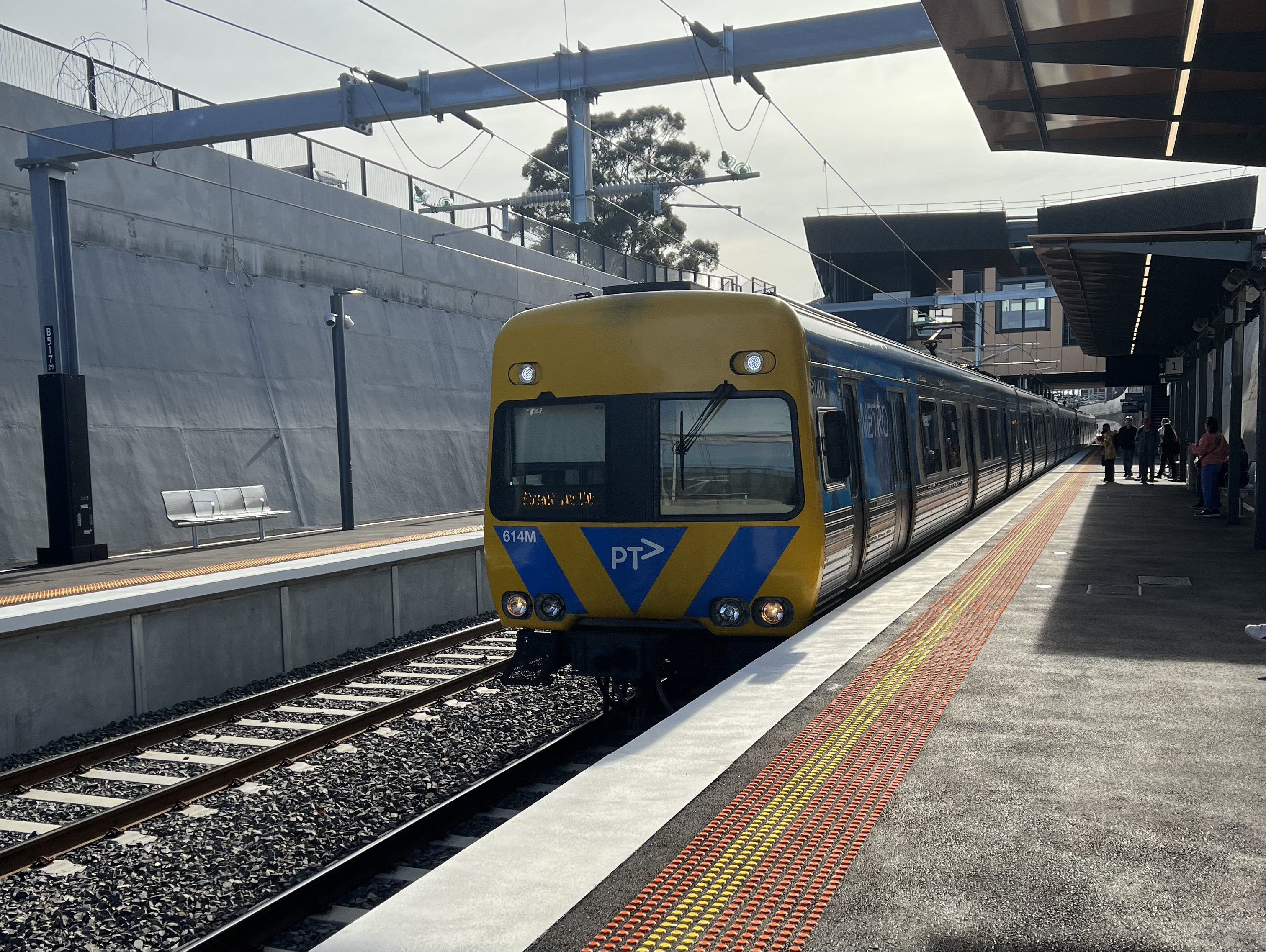
A Comeng train on a Flinders Street-bound service arrives at Platform 1, June 2022

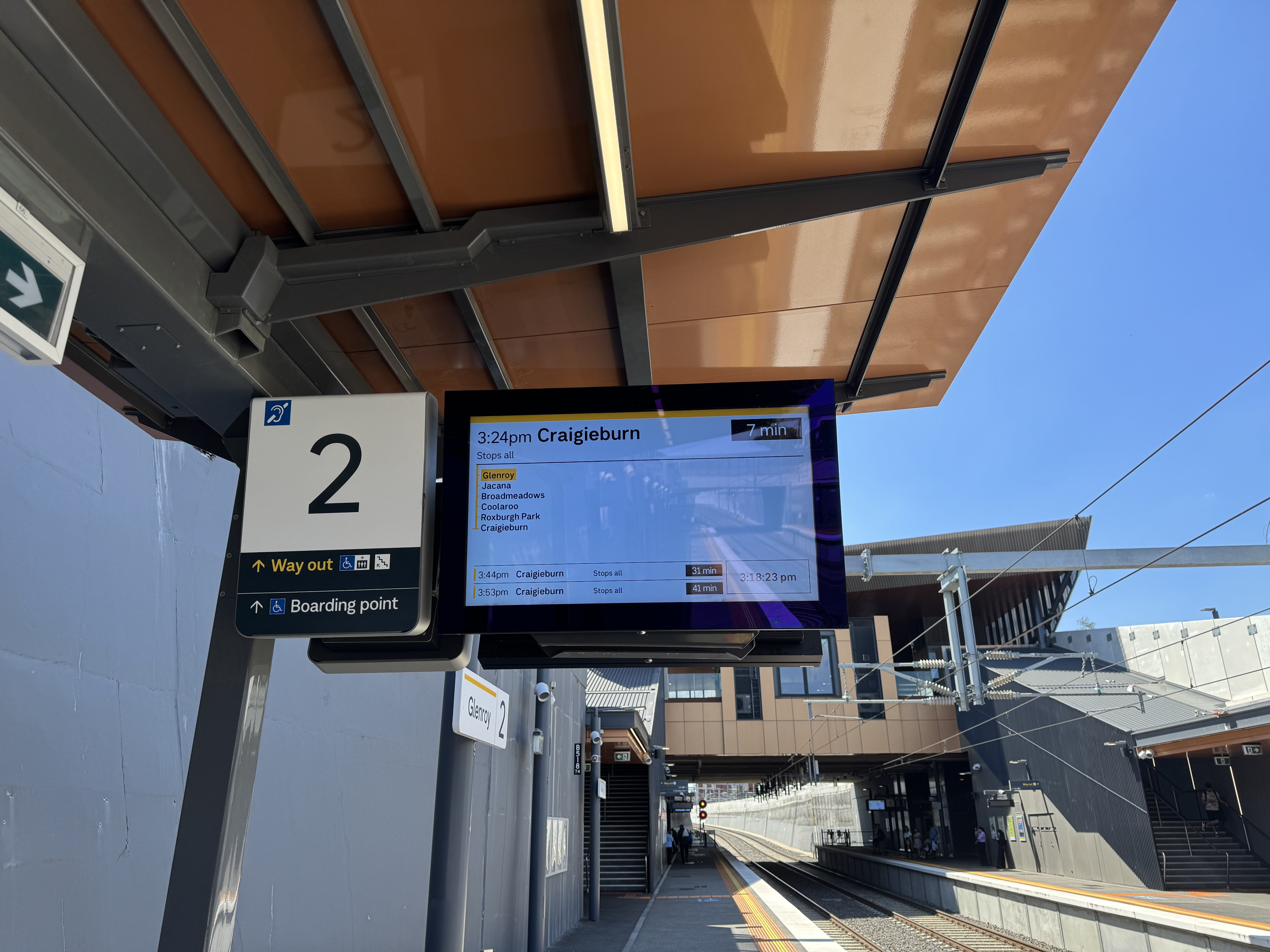
A PID on Platform 2 displaying a Craigieburn-bound service, November 2024
