= Coburg railway station =

Railway station in Melbourne, Australia

Coburg
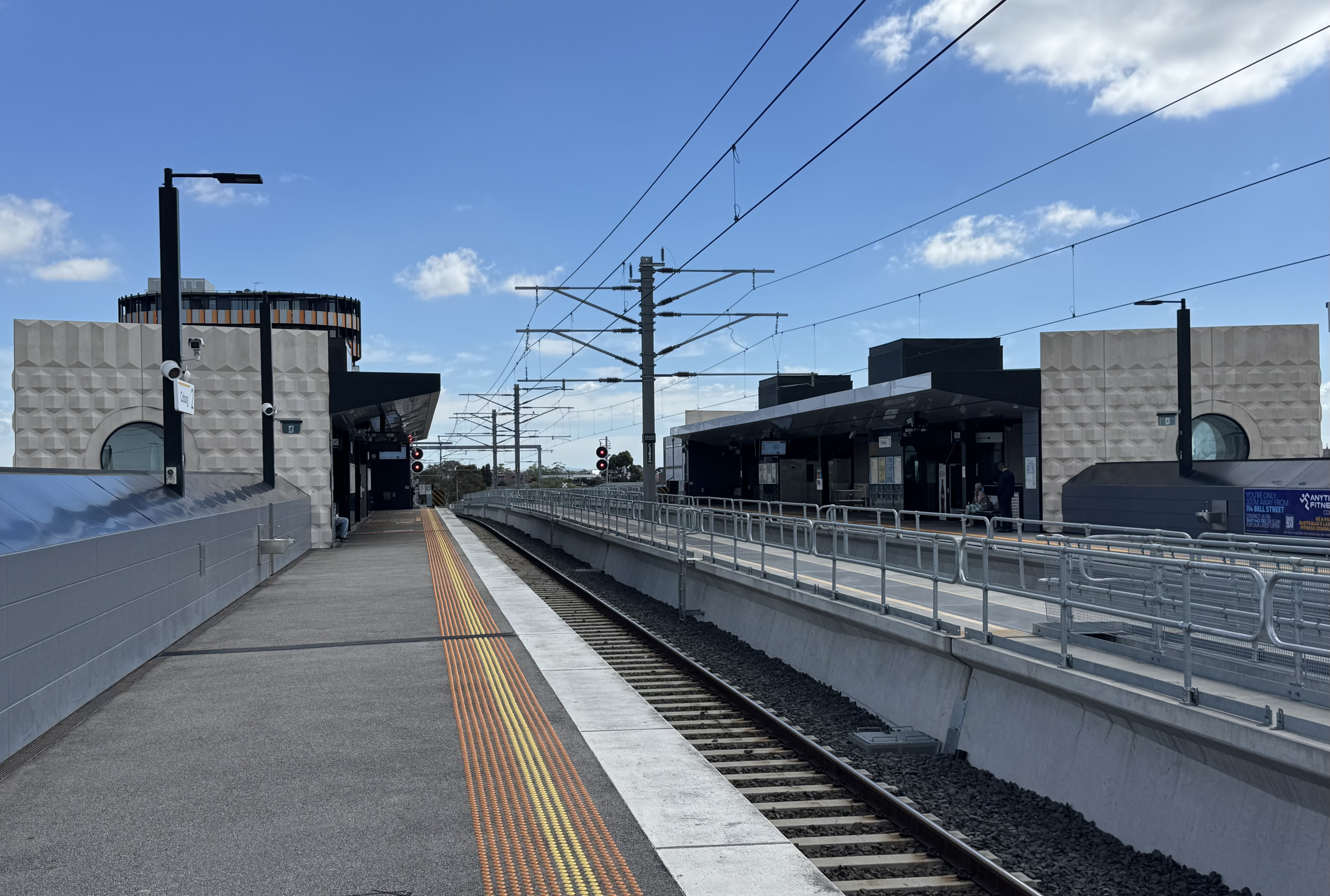
- Northbound view from Platform 2, November 2025

General information
- Location: Bell Street, Coburg, Victoria 3058; City of Merri-bek; Australia
- Coordinates: 37°44′32″S 144°57′48″E
- System: PTV commuter rail station
- Owner: VicTrack
- Operator: Metro Trains
- Line: Upfield
- Distance: 10.12 kilometres from Southern Cross
- Platforms: 2 side
- Tracks: 2
- Connections: Bus; Tram; Coach

Construction
- Structure type: Elevated
- Parking: Yes
- Cycle facilities: Yes
- Accessible: Yes—step free access

Other information
- Status: Operational, premium station
- Station code: COB
- Fare zone: Myki zone 1
- Website: Public Transport Victoria

History
- Opened: 9 September 1884; 142 years ago
- Rebuilt: 11 September 1995; 14 December 2020 (LXRP)
- Electrified: December 1920 (1500 V DC overhead)

Passengers
- 2005–2006: 445,827
- 2006–2007: 504,431 ▲13.14%
- 2007–2008: 584,413 ▲15.85%
- 2008–2009: 703,951 ▲39.55%
- 2009–2010: 740,498 ▲5.19%
- 2010–2011: 739,618 ▼0.11%
- 2011–2012: 755,836 ▲2.19%
- 2012–2013: Not measured
- 2013–2014: 651,960 ▼13.74%
- 2014–2015: 669,654 ▲2.71%
- 2015–2016: 656,597 ▼1.94%
- 2016–2017: 690,891 ▲5.22%
- 2017–2018: 755,491 ▲9.35%
- 2018–2019: 728,500 ▼3.57%
- 2019–2020: 508,700 ▼30.2%
- 2020–2021: 145,500 ▼71.4%
- 2021–2022: 272,750 ▲87.45%
- 2022–2023: 399,550 ▲46.49%
- 2023–2024: 498,850 ▲24.85%
- 2024–2025: 511,300 ▲2.5%

Services
Preceding station	Metro Trains	Following station
Moreland towards Flinders Street	Upfield line	Batman towards Upfield
Track layout
Location

Coburg station is a railway station operated by Metro Trains Melbourne on the Upfield line, part of the Melbourne rail network. It serves the northern suburb of Coburg in Melbourne, Victoria, Australia. The station opened on 9 September 1884, with the former ground level station closed and demolished in July 2020 and the current elevated station provided in December 2020 by the Level Crossing Removal Project.

Coburg is an elevated premium station, consisting of two side platforms connected by staircases, lifts and a ground level concourse. The station fully complies with the Disability Discrimination Act 1992 and is accessible as there is a lift connecting to the ground level concourse and the station platforms on either side.

The station is also served by eight bus routes, one tram route and two V/Line bus coach services. It includes Broadmeadows Bus Service route 530, Dysons bus routes 513, 514 and 561, Kinetic Melbourne bus routes 512 and 903, Ventura Bus Lines routes 526 and 527 and Yarra Trams route 19. The station is approximately 11 km (6.8 mi) or around a 25 minute train ride to Flinders Street via the City Loop.

== Description ==
Coburg railway station is located in the northern suburb of Coburg in Melbourne, Victoria, Australia. The station is owned by VicTrack, a state government agency and the station is operated by Metro Trains Melbourne. The station is 11 km (6.8 mi) or around a 25 minute train ride to Flinders Street. The adjacent stations are Moreland station up towards Flinders Street and Batman station down towards Upfield.

The station consists of two side platforms with two edges. As is standard in Melbourne, the platform has an asphalt surface with concrete on edges. The side platforms are approximately 160 m (524 ft 11 in) long, long enough for a 7 car High Capacity Metro Train. The station features a ground level concourse, accessible by stairs and lifts up to the elevated platforms. There is one main station building, opened in 2020, which contains a waiting room, a customer service, PSO office and a ground level concourse inside the main station building. The station building presents as a civic gesture drawing abstract references to the formal language of classical architecture and has decorative features such as friezes, hexagonal reliefs on the pre-cast elements and the primary colours of the station are orange.

The station building, concourse and platform largely stayed the same since the station was rebuilt in 2020. There are 120 parking spaces, including 2 accessible parking spaces and 26 protected bike parking at the station. The station is listed as fully accessible on the Metro Trains website, as there are lifts and accessible features available at the station.

== History ==
=== 19th century ===
Coburg station opened on 9 September 1884 as the terminus when the railway line was extended from North Melbourne. Like the suburb itself, the station was named after the Duke of Edinburgh, a member of the House of Saxe-Coburg and Gotha. The suburb was renamed from Pentridge to Coburg in 1870, when the Duke was planning to visit the colony.

On 8 October 1889, the line was extended to Somerton, where it junctioned with the main North East railway line to Albury.

==== Heritage listing ====
The former Coburg railway line was added to the Victorian Heritage Register on 23 October 1997 in recognition of its historical significance. The heritage curtail is extensive that includes seven distinct precincts that contain nineteenth century station buildings and platforms at Coburg, Moreland, Jewell, and Brunswick, substations, signal boxes, gatekeepers cabins, remnant interlocking and safe-working equipment, levers and rodding, signals, gates and industrial sidings.

=== 20th century ===
On 13 July 1903, the line beyond Coburg was closed, but was reopened to Fawkner on 13 November 1906. On 2 December 1920, the line to Coburg was electrified.

In 1962, boom barriers replaced hand-operated gates at the former Bell Street level crossing, which was at the down end of the station. In 1972, the former ground-level station building was refurbished.

A signal box was located at the up end of the station, directly opposite the former Munro Street level crossing. It was provided in 1928 to control the interlocked gates at the former level crossing, and replaced the original signal box. In 1983, boom barriers replaced the interlocked gates.

Although the line from Coburg to Fawkner was duplicated in 1959, Coburg continued to have only one side platform, used by trains travelling in both directions. On 11 September 1995, an additional platform (Platform 2) was provided. On 28 June 1996, Coburg was upgraded to a premium station, featuring the addition of customer service facilities and the conversion of the now heritage station building into a waiting room.

=== 21st century ===
==== Level Crossing Removal Project ====
In 2014, the Andrews government announced a $2.4 billion program to remove and grade separate the Bell Street level crossing, along with 49 other level crossings in Melbourne. It was later formed under the Level Crossing Removal Project program in 2015 and at the time, the Bell Street level crossing had not been decided how the grade separation would be achieved.

On 30 November 2018, the Andrews government announced that the Level Crossing Removal Project would remove an additional level crossing at Munro Street, Coburg, along with 24 other level crossings in Melbourne as part of a $6.6 billion program. On 7 May 2019, the Level Crossing Removal Project announced that the Bell Street and Munro Street level crossings was chosen to be elevated and Coburg station to be rebuilt.

On 12 June 2019, the designs for the new, rebuilt station was announced.

On 27 July 2020, the Bell Street and Munro Street level crossings and equipment were eliminated and on the same night, the ground level station was closed and demolished and the Platform 1 heritage building restored during these works. On 2 November 2020, trains started running through the new elevated rail bridge after a four month closure. On 14 December 2020, the rebuilt station opened to passengers.

== Platforms and services ==
Coburg has two side platforms. The station is currently served by the Upfield line, part of the metropolitan railway network. The Upfield line runs from Upfield station, north of Melbourne, joining with the Craigieburn, Werribee and Williamstown lines before travelling through to Flinders Street via the City Loop in a clockwise direction during weekday morning peak hours or all day on weekends and public holidays and to Flinders Street via Southern Cross in an anti-clockwise direction during weekday afternoon and evening peak hours.

Coburg platform arrangement
Platform	Line	Destination	Via	Service Type	Notes	Source
1	Upfield line	Flinders Street	City Loop	All stations	See City Loop for operating patterns	
2	Upfield line	Upfield		All stations		

== Transport links ==
CDC Melbourne operates one route via Coburg station:

- 530 : Campbellfield Plaza Shopping Centre – Coburg

Kinetic Melbourne operates five bus routes via Coburg station:

- 512 : Strathmore station – East Coburg
- 513 : Eltham station – Glenroy station (via Lower Plenty)
- 514 : Eltham station – Glenroy station (via Greensborough)
- 561 : Macleod – Pascoe Vale station
- SmartBus 903 : Altona station – Mordialloc

Ventura Bus Lines operates two routes via Coburg station:

- 526 : Coburg – Reservoir
- 527 : Gowrie station – Northland Shopping Centre

Yarra Trams operates one route via Coburg station:

- : Coburg North – Flinders Street station (via Elizabeth Street)

V/Line coach services to:

- Barmah via Heathcote and Shepparton
- Barham, New South Wales (change at Heathcote)
