= Moreland railway station =

Railway station in Melbourne, Australia

Moreland
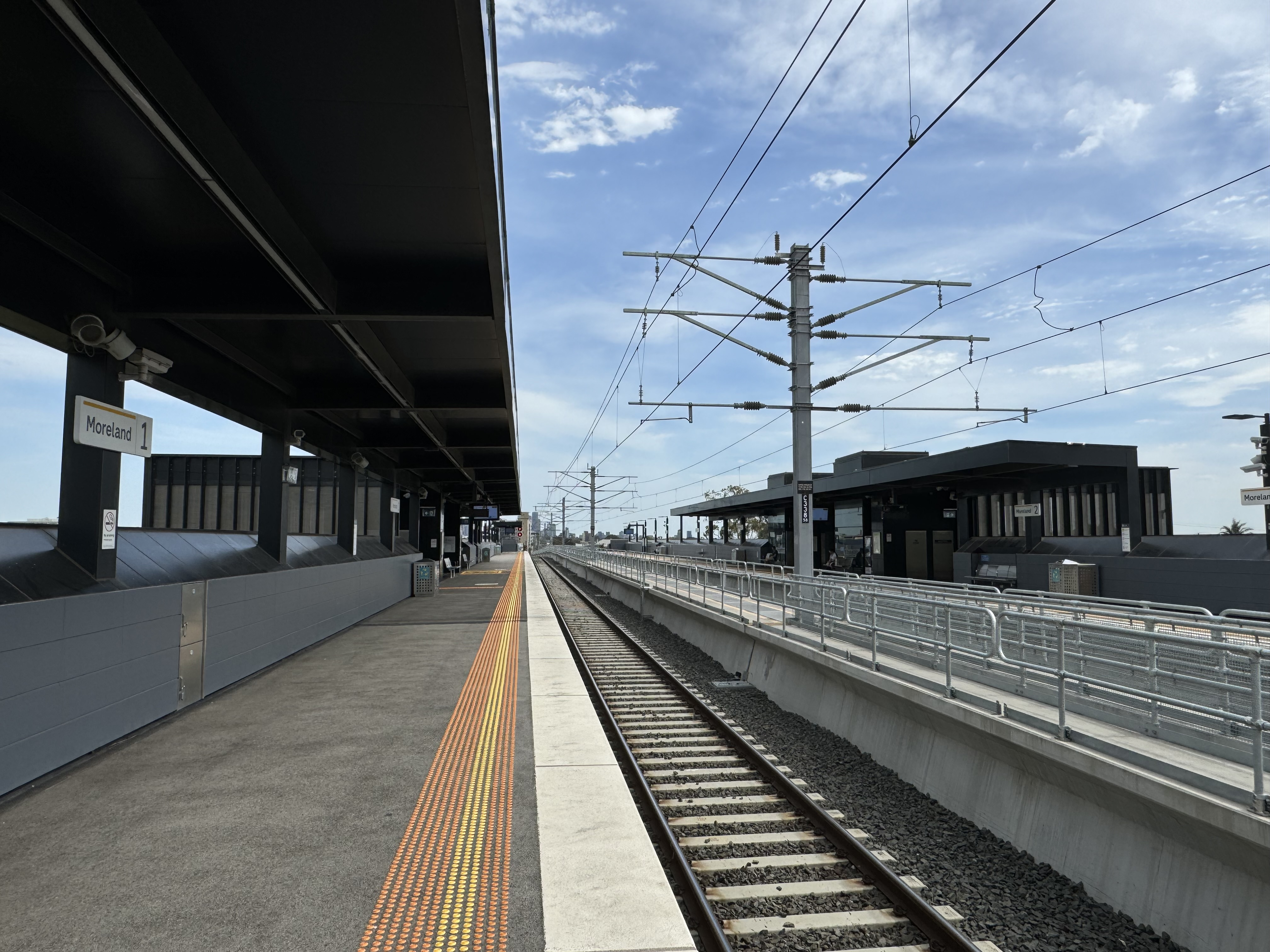
- Southbound view from Platform 1, November 2024

General information
- Location: Cameron Street, Coburg, Victoria 3058; City of Merri-bek; Australia
- Coordinates: 37°45′16″S 144°57′43″E
- System: PTV commuter rail station
- Owner: VicTrack
- Operator: Metro Trains
- Line: Upfield
- Distance: 8.78 kilometres from Southern Cross
- Platforms: 2 side
- Tracks: 2
- Tram routes: 6, 19
- Connections: Bus; Tram

Construction
- Structure type: Elevated
- Parking: 196
- Cycle facilities: Yes
- Accessible: Yes—step-free access

Other information
- Status: Operational, unstaffed
- Station code: MLD
- Fare zone: Myki zone 1
- Website: Public Transport Victoria

History
- Opened: 9 September 1884; 142 years ago
- Rebuilt: 14 December 2020 (LXRP)
- Electrified: December 1920 (1500 V DC overhead)

Passengers
- 2005–2006: 274,412
- 2006–2007: 296,164 ▲7.92%
- 2007–2008: 345,129 ▲16.53%
- 2008–2009: 367,540 ▲6.49%
- 2009–2010: 381,433 ▲3.78%
- 2010–2011: 369,492 ▼3.13%
- 2011–2012: 339,088 ▼8.23%
- 2012–2013: Not measured
- 2013–2014: 341,103 ▲0.59%
- 2014–2015: 345,260 ▲1.21%
- 2015–2016: 349,387 ▲1.19%
- 2016–2017: 369,953 ▲5.89%
- 2017–2018: 390,559 ▲5.57%
- 2018–2019: 380,850 ▼2.48%
- 2019–2020: 272,400 ▼28.5%
- 2020–2021: 91,250 ▼66.5%
- 2021–2022: 266,400 ▲191.95%

Services
Preceding station	Metro Trains	Following station
Anstey towards Flinders Street	Upfield line	Coburg towards Upfield
Track layout
Location

Moreland station is a railway station operated by Metro Trains Melbourne on the Upfield line, part of the Melbourne rail network. It serves the northern suburb of Coburg in Melbourne, Victoria, Australia. Moreland station is an elevated unstaffed station, featuring two side platforms. It opened on 9 September 1884, with the current station provided in December 2020.

== History ==
Moreland station opened when the railway line from North Melbourne was extended to Coburg.

The name Moreland has been associated with the local area since 1839 when land speculator Farquhar McCrae acquired 638 acres of land between the Moonee Ponds Creek and Sydney Road. McCrae named this land Moreland after the Jamaican slave plantation that was run by his father and grandfather. The landholdings were increased in 1841 to encompass a total of 908 acres, which was subdivided in 1858 including the establishment of Moreland Road.

On 2 May 1975, the former ground-level station was damaged by fire.

In 1983, a number of sidings at the station were dismantled. In 1986, manually controlled boom barriers replaced interlocked gates at the former Moreland Road level crossing, which was at the up end of the station. In August 1988, former sidings "A", "B" and "C" and associated point work were abolished. Also abolished were the up and down end crossovers, and a number of disc signals.

Under the Level Crossing Removal Project, the Moreland Road and Reynard Street level crossings were removed by grade separation and Moreland Station was rebuilt at elevation. The level crossings and ground level station closed on 27 July 2020; the elevated line opened to trains on 2 November 2020, and the rebuilt station opened to passengers on 14 December 2020. The Platform 1 heritage building of the former ground level station was restored during these works.

=== Heritage listing ===
The former Coburg railway line was added to the Victorian Heritage Register on 23 October 1997 in recognition of its historical significance. The heritage curtail is extensive that includes seven distinct precincts that contain nineteenth century station buildings and platforms at Coburg, Moreland, Jewell, and Brunswick, substations, signal boxes, gatekeepers cabins, remnant interlocking and safe-working equipment, levers and rodding, signals, gates and industrial sidings.

== Platforms and services ==
Moreland has two side platforms. It is served by Upfield line trains.

Moreland platform arrangement
Platform	Line	Destination	Via	Service Type	Notes	Source
1	Upfield line	Flinders Street	City Loop	All stations	See City Loop for operating patterns	
2	Upfield line	Upfield		All stations		

== Transport links ==
Kinetic Melbourne operates one route via Moreland station:

- 510 : Essendon station – Ivanhoe station

Yarra Trams operates two routes via Moreland station:

- : to Glen Iris
- : North Coburg – Flinders Street station (Elizabeth Street CBD)
