= Broadmeadows railway station, Melbourne =

Railway station in Melbourne, Australia

Broadmeadows
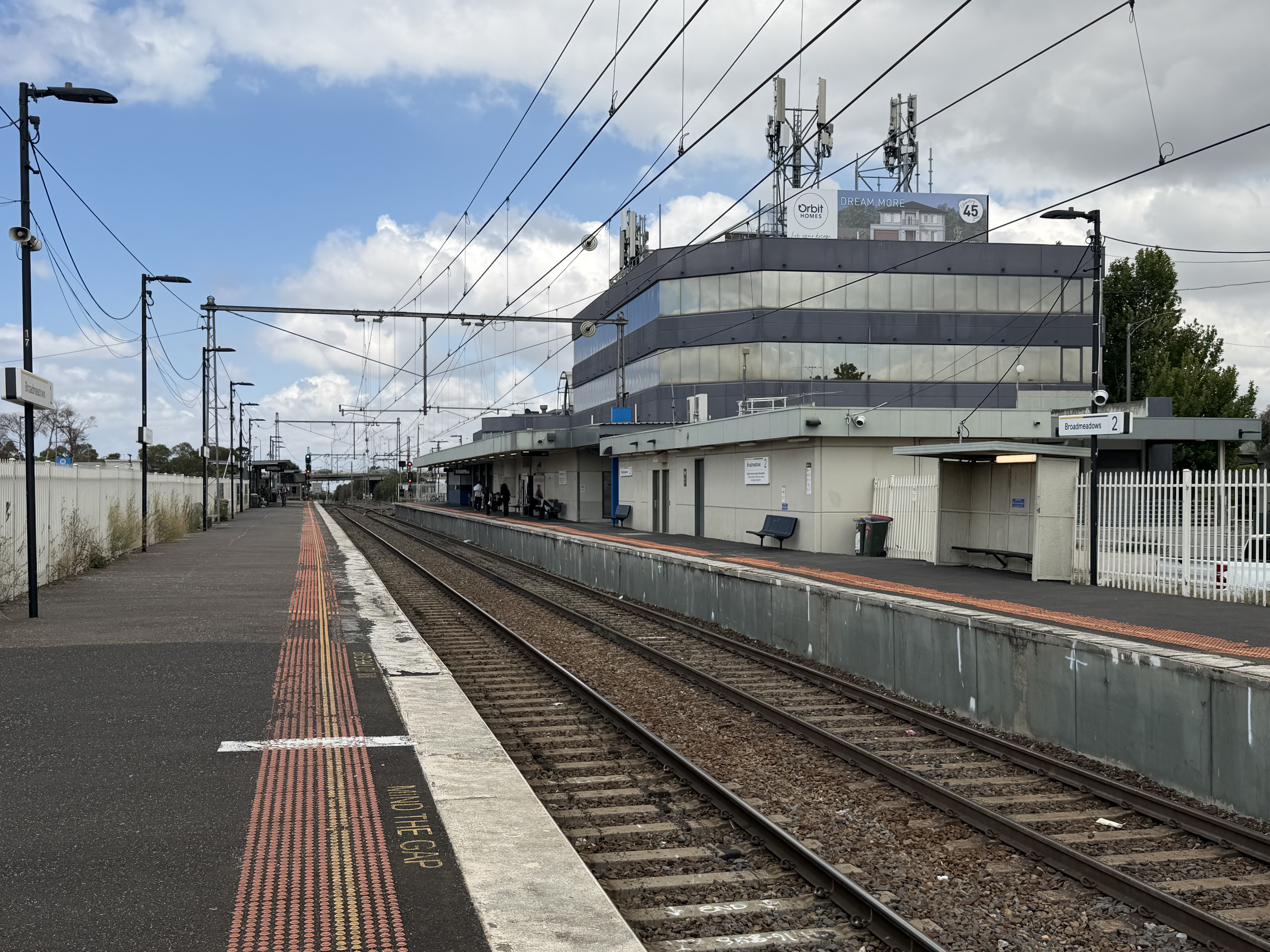
- Southbound view from Platform 1, January 2026

General information
- Location: Pascoe Vale Road, Broadmeadows, Victoria 3047; City of Hume; Australia
- Coordinates: 37°40′58″S 144°55′11″E
- System: PTV commuter, regional and NSW TrainLink inter-city rail station
- Owner: VicTrack
- Operator: Metro Trains
- Lines: Craigieburn; Seymour Shepparton (Tocumwal); Albury Southern Great Southern (North East)
- Distance: 16.80 kilometres from Southern Cross
- Platforms: 3 side
- Tracks: 3
- Connections: Bus

Construction
- Structure type: Ground
- Parking: 151 spaces
- Cycle facilities: Yes
- Accessible: Yes – step free access

Other information
- Status: Operational, premium station
- Station code: BMS
- Fare zone: Myki zone 2
- Website: Public Transport Victoria

History
- Opened: 1 February 1873; 153 years ago
- Rebuilt: 16 March 1990 (station building); Late 2009 (standard gauge platform)
- Electrified: September 1921 (1500 V DC overhead)

Passengers
2005–2018 numbers
2005–2006	727,413
2006–2007	828,840 ▲13.94%
2007–2008	802,034 ▼3.23%
2008–2009	682,694 ▼14.88%
2009–2010	716,054 ▲4.88%
2010–2011	684,283 ▼4.43%
2011–2012	733,841 ▲7.24%
2012–2013	Not measured
2013–2014	779,094 ▲6.16%
2014–2015	791,681 ▲1.61%
2015–2016	918,790 ▲16.05%
2016–2017	937,078 ▲1.99%
2017–2018	948,979 ▲1.27%
- 2018–2019: 953,371 ▲0.46%
- 2019–2020: 810,850 ▼14.94%
- 2020–2021: 395,750 ▼51.19%
- 2021–2022: 447,650 ▲13.11%
- 2022–2023: 725,000 ▲61.96%
- 2023–2024: 874,950 ▲20.68%
- 2024–2025: 878,300 ▲0.38%

Services
Preceding station	Metro Trains	Following station
Jacana towards Flinders Street	Craigieburn line	Coolaroo towards Craigieburn
Preceding station	V/Line	Following station
Southern Cross Terminus	Albury line	Seymour towards Albury
North Melbourne towards Southern Cross	Seymour line Weekday peak only	Craigieburn towards Seymour
Essendon towards Southern Cross	Seymour line Weekday peak only	Craigieburn towards Seymour
Southern Cross Terminus	Seymour line	Craigieburn towards Seymour
Southern Cross One-way operation	Shepparton line 1 weekday early morning service	Craigieburn towards Shepparton
North Melbourne 2 weekday services towards Southern Cross	Shepparton line	Donnybrook towards Shepparton
Southern Cross Terminus	Shepparton line	Donnybrook towards Shepparton
Preceding station	NSW TrainLink	Following station
Southern Cross Terminus	NSW TrainLink Southern Line Melbourne XPT	Seymour towards Sydney
Track layout
Location

Broadmeadows station is a railway station operated by Metro Trains Melbourne and V/Line on the Craigieburn line, the regional Seymour and Albury lines, and the NSW TrainLink Southern line. It serves the northern suburb of Broadmeadows in Melbourne, Victoria, Australia. Broadmeadows is a ground level premium station featuring three side platforms. Platforms 1 and 2 are used for broad gauge Metro and V/Line services, while Platform 3 is used for standard gauge V/Line and NSW TrainLink services. The station opened on 1 February 1873, with the current station building on platform 2 provided in 1990 and the standard gauge platform provided in 2009.

Train stabling facilities are located to the north of the station.

== History ==
The railway past the site of Broadmeadows station originally opened in 1872, as part of the North East line to School House Lane. At the time of opening, the village of Broadmeadows was located some distance from the station, becoming known as "Old Broadmeadows", and now Westmeadows. It was not until the post-World War II housing development that the gap between the old town and the station was filled.

The station was initially provided with a 150-foot (46 m)-long platform, a goods siding and shed, and a passing loop for trains on the single track. That early station was closer to Camp Road than the station today. In 1878, a permanent station building was provided, along with a longer platform, all on the present site. In 1885, the line was duplicated, and a second platform was provided, of timber construction.

In 1920, sheds and sidings for bagged wheat were provided, to handle the overflow from the Port of Williamstown. The sheds and sidings have since been removed.

In 1919, electric train services between the city and Essendon were inaugurated, with electrification extended to Broadmeadows in 1921. However, Essendon remained the terminus of most suburban services, with a shuttle service operating beyond until 1925, and all day through services to Broadmeadows not provided until 1941.

The level crossing at Camp Road was initially protected by hand-operated gates, with boom barriers provided in 1961. In 1978, the level crossing was replaced with the current overpass. Barry Road also had a level crossing, which was replaced by the current overpass in 1957, as part of the construction of the standard gauge line. The Riggall Street overpass, about a kilometre north of Broadmeadows, was provided during 1974–1975. In 1971, the current pedestrian underpass, which is located at the up end of the station, was provided.

In 1889, a lever frame in the signal box was installed, and was replaced in 1929, when the Albion-Jacana freight line opened. In 1961, a signal panel was provided at the station. In 1965, mechanical signalling along the line to Essendon was abolished, but it was not until 2000 that solid-state interlocking was provided. In 2007, the control centre was moved to Craigieburn, as part of the extension of suburban electrification to Craigieburn.

The original 1878 station building was demolished in 1988, and was replaced by a new structure, which was opened on 16 March 1990 by then Transport Minister Jim Kennan, as part of a commercial development of the site. On 21 March 1996, Broadmeadows was upgraded to a premium station.

In 2007, suburban electric services were extended to Craigieburn. As part of these works, the siding closest to the standard gauge line (Siding "B") was abolished and removed in February of that year.

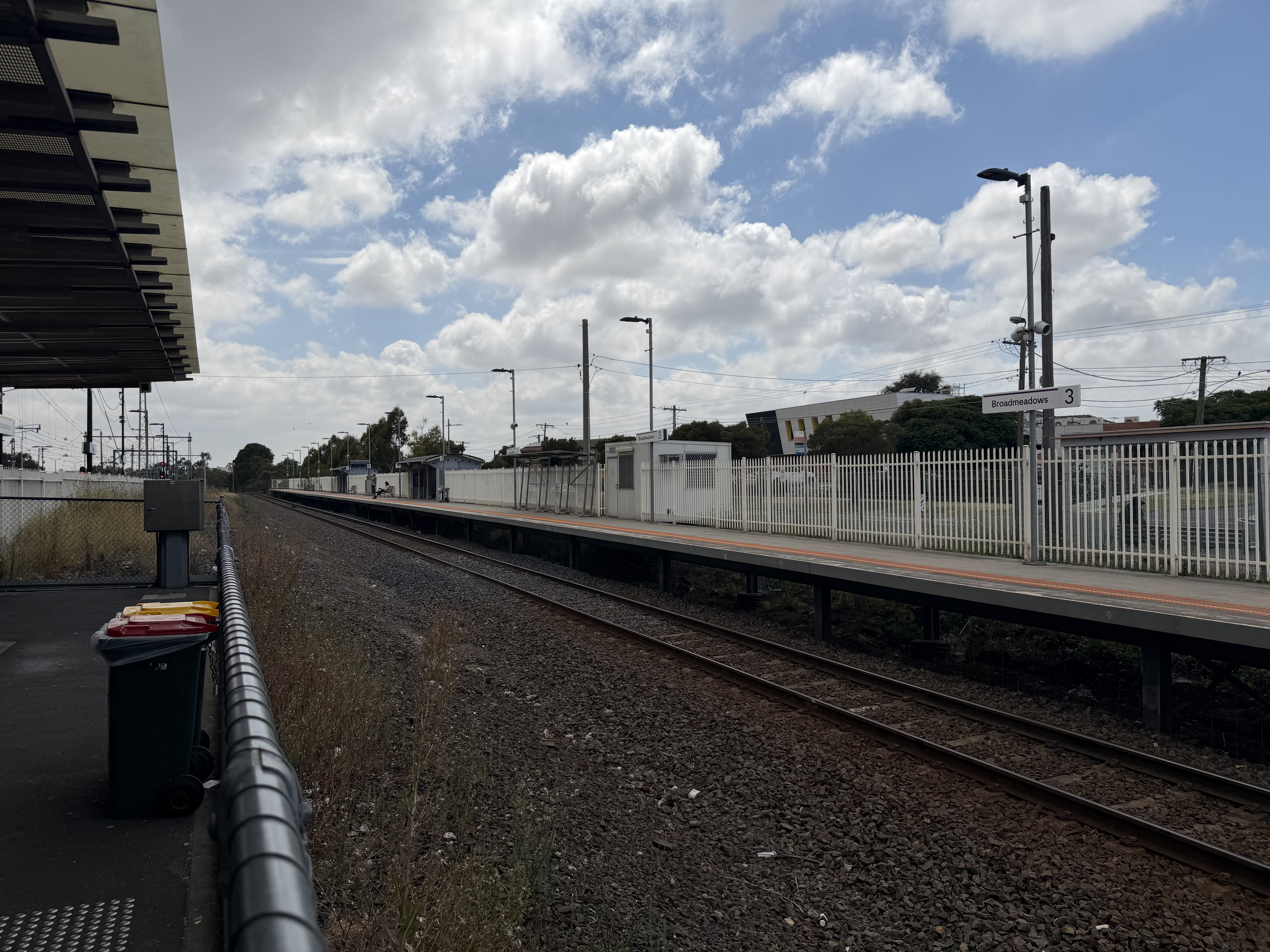
The Standard Gauge Platform 3 at Broadmeadows railway station, January 2026

In late 2009, a third platform on the parallel standard gauge line was provided, as part of the North East Rail Revitalisation Project, under which the broad gauge line to Albury was converted to standard gauge and a standard gauge V/Line Albury service was inaugurated.

On 10 May 2026, the Victorian Government announced that Broadmeadows station would receive funding for amenity and station safety upgrades as part of the 2026/27 $7.6 million State Budget.

During World War II, an Army siding was provided to Broadstore, located to the north-east of the station. It opened on 12 October 1942 and remained in place until 1982. The at-grade crossing was abolished in the year that the siding closed, however, the track to Broadstore was not lifted until after 1991. The Broadstore branch was a single un-electrified track, extending in an easterly direction for approximately 1.6 kilometres and terminating at the Maygar Barracks on Camp Road. At one time, it also had a further branch that served a migrant hostel. The Broadstore branch line is marked on maps of the Victorian Railways in 1950, 1960, 1970, and 1980, terminating at a station marked "Broadstore".

=== Incidents and accidents ===
On 14 September 1960, steam locomotive R755, which was hauling a passenger service from Numurkah, was involved in a collision when it rear-ended an Albury – Melbourne goods service at 40 mph (65 km/h). The goods service had been detaching a number of livestock wagons and was given clearance to enter the Albion–Jacana freight line. However, the passenger service, which had been waiting at Craigieburn, was also given clearance. The goods service split when it was moving forward, delaying the train, when the collision occurred. After the accident, R755 was re-railed and moved to the Broadstore branch line. The locomotive was damaged beyond repair and was scrapped in November of that year.

On 3 February 1979, a Numurkah – Geelong bound grain train derailed as it was entering the Albion–Jacana freight line. Eight wagons derailed, and the overhead wires and stanchions were also brought down.

On 14 November 1996, two Comeng train sets collided between Broadmeadows and Jacana, injuring 13 people. It occurred after a city-bound train collided with a stationary Broadmeadows-bound train. Two carriages derailed in the collision.

On 3 February 2003, an unattended Comeng set, led by carriage 394M, rolled away from Broadmeadows station, and ran as far as Spencer Street, where it collided with V/Line locomotive N463, which was leading a Bacchus Marsh-bound train.

== Platforms and services ==
Broadmeadows has three side platforms. Platforms 1 and 2 are served by broad gauge Craigieburn line suburban trains, and V/Line Seymour and Shepparton line services. Platform 3 is served by standard gauge V/Line Albury and NSW TrainLink Sydney trains. A number of Metro Train services commence and terminate at Broadmeadows during the peak-hours.

=== Metropolitan ===
Broadmeadows platform arrangement
Platform	Line	Destination	Via	Service Type	Notes	Source
1	Craigieburn line	Flinders Street	City Loop	All stations	See City Loop for operating patterns	
2	Craigieburn line	Craigieburn		All stations		

=== Regional ===
Broadmeadows platform arrangement
Platform	Line	Destination	Service Type	Notes
1	Seymour line Shepparton line	Southern Cross	Three weekday morning peak-hour V/Line services (Seymour), one weekday morning peak-hour V/Line service (Shepparton)	Set down only
2	Seymour line Shepparton line	Seymour, Shepparton		Pick up only
3	Albury line	Albury, Southern Cross		Set down only (towards Southern Cross), Pick up only (towards Albury)

=== NSW TrainLink ===
Broadmeadows platform arrangement
Platform	Line	Destination	Operator	Notes
3	NSW TrainLink Southern	Sydney Central, Southern Cross	NSW TrainLink XPT	Set down only (towards Southern Cross), Pick up only (towards Central station, Sydney, New South Wales, Australia)

== Transport links ==
Eleven bus routes operate via Broadmeadows station, under contract to Public Transport Victoria:

- 477 : to Moonee Ponds Junction (operated by CDC Melbourne)
- 484 : to Roxburgh Park station (operated by CDC Melbourne)
- 532 : to Craigieburn station (operated by CDC Melbourne)
- 538 : to Somerset Estate (Campbellfield) (operated by CDC Melbourne)
- 540 : to Upfield station (operated by CDC Melbourne)
- 541 : to Craigieburn North (operated by CDC Melbourne)
- 542 : Roxburgh Park station – Pascoe Vale station (operated by CDC Melbourne)
- SmartBus 901 : Frankston station – Melbourne Airport (operated by Kinetic Melbourne)
- SmartBus 902 : Chelsea station – Westfield Airport West (operated by Kinetic Melbourne)
- Night Bus 953 : to Craigieburn (Saturday and Sunday mornings only) (operated by Ventura Bus Lines)
- Night Bus 959 : to Queen Street City (Saturday and Sunday mornings only) (operated by Ventura Bus Lines)
