= Gowrie railway station =

Railway station in Melbourne, Australia

Gowrie
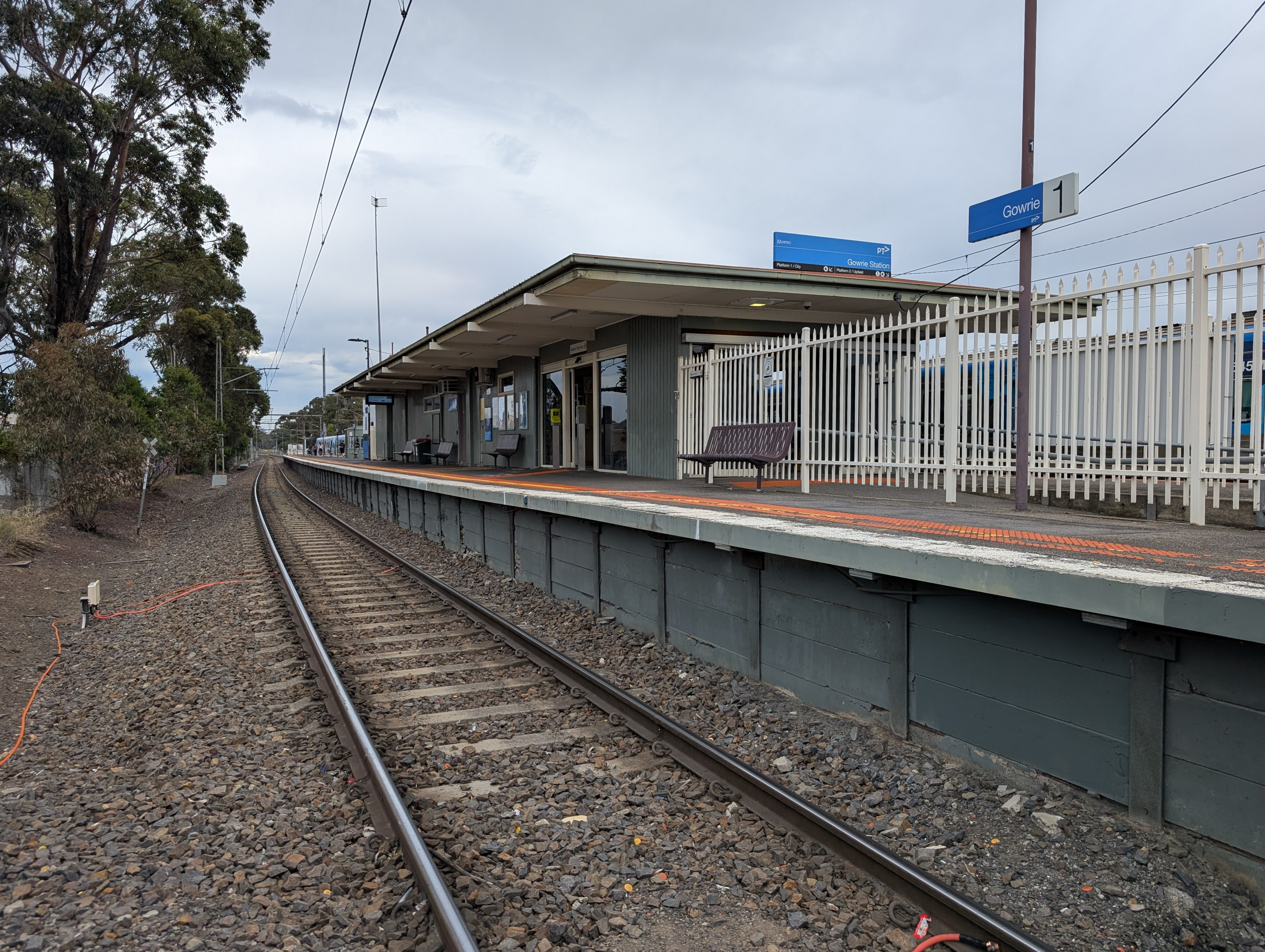
- Southbound view of the main station building and Platform 1, December 2025

General information
- Location: Sages Road, Fawkner, Victoria 3060; City of Merri-bek; Australia
- Coordinates: 37°42′03″S 144°57′32″E
- System: PTV commuter rail station
- Owner: VicTrack
- Operator: Metro Trains
- Line: Upfield
- Distance: 14.73 kilometres from Southern Cross
- Platforms: 2 (1 island)
- Tracks: 2
- Connections: Bus

Construction
- Structure type: Ground
- Parking: 100
- Cycle facilities: Yes
- Accessible: Yes—step-free access

Other information
- Status: Operational, premium station
- Station code: GOW
- Fare zone: Myki zone 2
- Website: Public Transport Victoria

History
- Opened: 17 May 1965; 61 years ago
- Electrified: August 1959 (1500 V DC overhead)
- Former names: Rail Motor Stopping Place No. 21 (1928–1956)

Passengers
- 2005–2006: 147,445
- 2006–2007: 167,907 ▲13.87%
- 2007–2008: 196,189 ▲16.84%
- 2008–2009: 230,169 ▲17.32%
- 2009–2010: 237,516 ▲3.19%
- 2010–2011: 234,647 ▼1.2%
- 2011–2012: 229,491 ▼2.19%
- 2012–2013: Not measured
- 2013–2014: 168,174 ▼26.71%
- 2014–2015: 196,805 ▲17.02%
- 2015–2016: 255,167 ▲29.65%
- 2016–2017: 263,233 ▲3.16%
- 2017–2018: 250,202 ▼4.95%
- 2018–2019: 321,300 ▲28.4%
- 2019–2020: 258,500 ▼19.55%
- 2020–2021: 112,050 ▼56.7%
- 2021–2022: 153,350 ▲36.85%
- 2022–2023: 201,250 ▲31.24%
- 2023–2024: 231,100 ▲14.83%
- 2024–2025: 232,350 ▲0.54%

Services
Preceding station	Metro Trains	Following station
Fawkner towards Flinders Street	Upfield line	Upfield Terminus
Track layout
Location

Gowrie station is a railway station operated by Metro Trains Melbourne on the Upfield line, part of the Melbourne rail network. It serves the northern suburb of Fawkner in Melbourne, Victoria, Australia. Gowrie station is a ground level premium station, featuring an island platform with two faces. It opened on 17 May 1965.

== History ==
=== 1928–1956 ===
On 16 October 1928, after the reinstatement of a passenger service on the Fawkner – Somerton line in March of that year, Rail Motor Stopping Place No. 21 opened at the site of the present Gowrie station. It was closed on 5 May 1956, when the passenger service ceased.

=== 1965–present ===
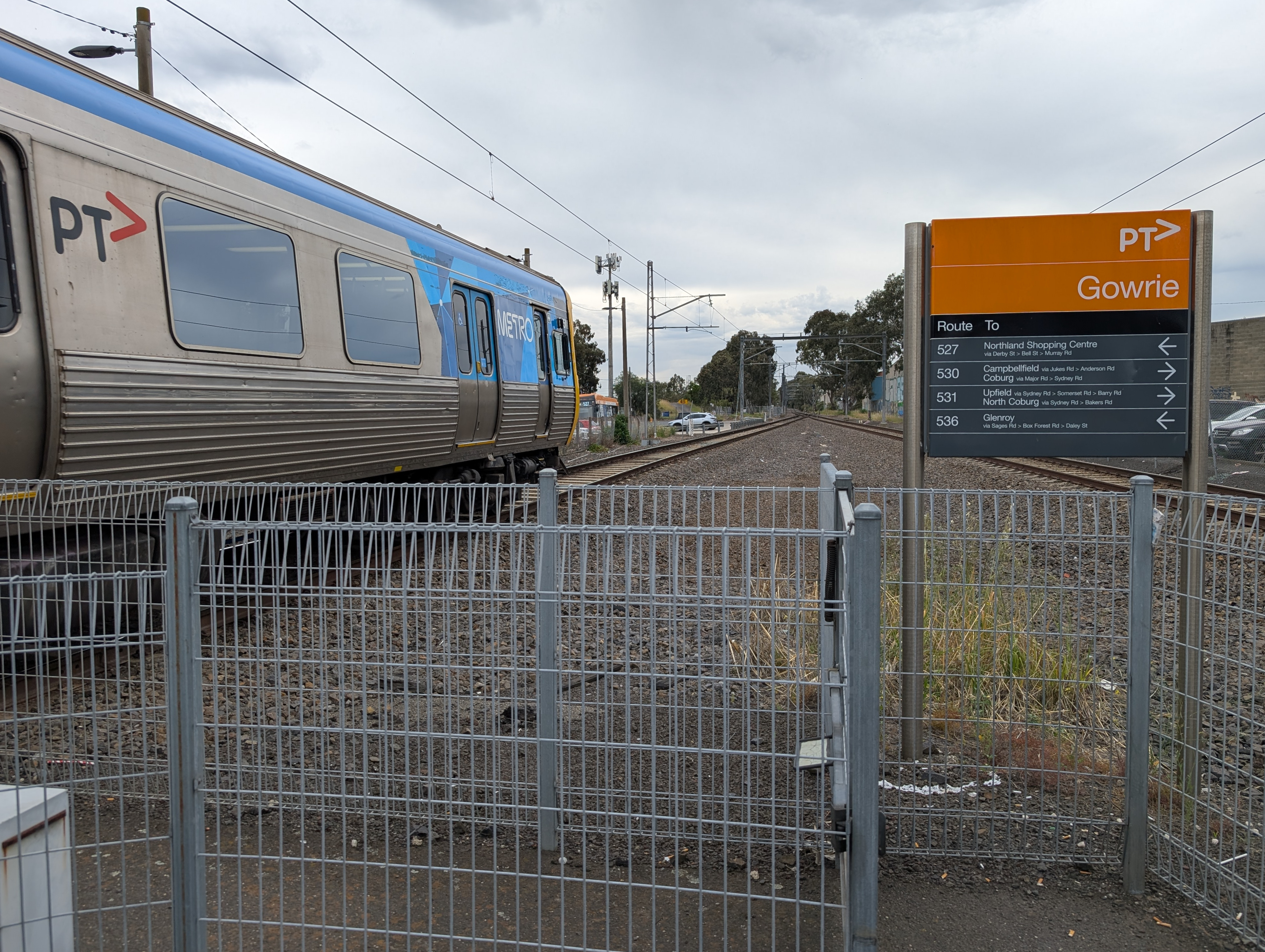
Comeng train operating a service to Upfield about to enter single track section north of Gowrie.

On 17 May 1965, Gowrie station opened in its current form, on what was by then the Upfield line. The name of the station derives from a former grazing property called Gowrie Park, which the owner named after Gowrie, in the UK. The Fawkner Crematorium and Memorial Park is located on part of the former property.

Just after 4:45am on 2 August 1977, a seven-car Harris train set rolled away from the station when the driver and guard were changing ends, having taken the train out of a siding, prior to operating a city-bound service from Upfield. The train passed through fifteen level crossings and destroyed seven sets of hand gates before stopping just after Brunswick, between the Albert and Dawson Streets level crossings.

In 1998, Gowrie was upgraded to a premium station. Also in that year, the track from Fawkner to Gowrie was duplicated and boom barriers were provided at the Box Forest Road level crossing, in the up direction from the station. Immediately north of the station, the double track merges into a single track, which continues to the terminus at Upfield. Prior to 1998, Platform 1 was a dock platform for terminating trains, which meant that trains could not pass each other there, but had to do so further down the line at Merlynston.

Under the 2013 PTV Network Development Plan, the line between Gowrie and Upfield was to be duplicated, and the line to Roxburgh Park reinstated. That was to include a flyover across the North East standard gauge line, to allow Seymour V/Line services to run via Upfield, and eventual electrification of the line to Wallan.

A track turnback at Gowrie to allow more frequent services on the Upfield Line was planned as part of the Metro Tunnel. Despite opposition from advocacy groups, including the Public Transport Users Association, this was cancelled in January 2025 as part of wider cutbacks to the project and no more services were added.

== Platforms and services ==
Gowrie has one island platform with two faces. It is served by Upfield line trains.

Gowrie platform arrangement
Platform	Line	Destination	Via	Service Type	Notes	Source
1	Upfield line	Flinders Street	City Loop	All stations	See City Loop for operating patterns	
2	Upfield line	Upfield		All stations		

== Transport links ==
CDC Melbourne operates two routes via Gowrie station, under contract to Transport Victoria:

- 530 : Campbellfield Plaza Shopping Centre – Coburg
- 531 : Upfield station – North Coburg

Kinetic Melbourne operates one bus route to and from Gowrie station, under contract to Transport Victoria:

- 536 : to Glenroy station

Ventura Bus Lines operates one route to and from Gowrie station, under contract to Transport Victoria:

- 527 : to Northland Shopping Centre
