= Upfield railway station =

Railway station in Melbourne, Australia

Upfield
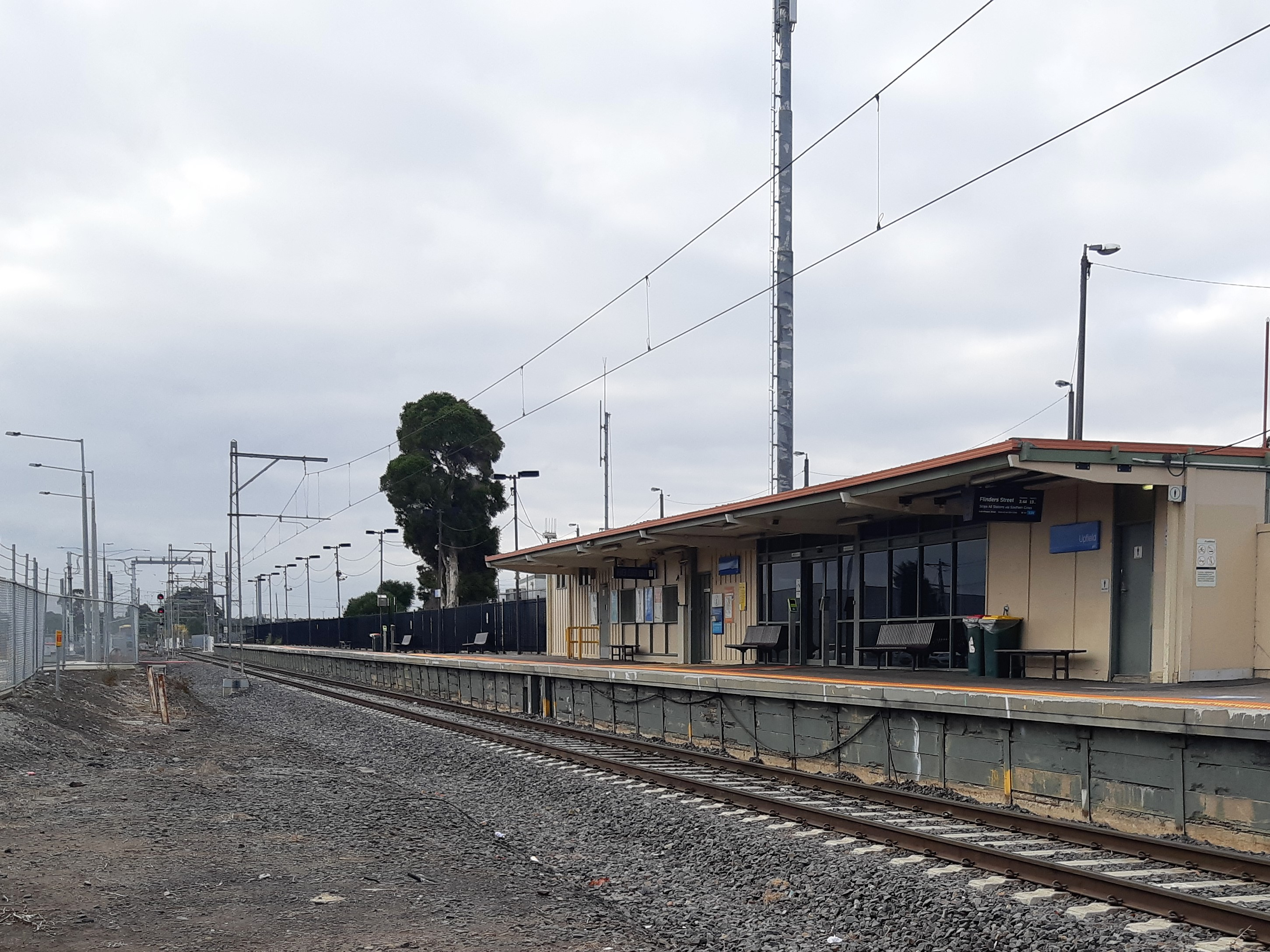
- Northbound view of the single station platform in June 2019

General information
- Location: Barry Road, Campbellfield, Victoria 3061; City of Hume; Australia
- Coordinates: 37°39′58″S 144°56′48″E
- System: PTV commuter rail station
- Owner: VicTrack
- Operator: Metro Trains
- Line: Upfield
- Distance: 18.86 kilometres from Southern Cross
- Platforms: 1
- Tracks: 1
- Connections: Bus

Construction
- Structure type: Ground
- Parking: 25
- Cycle facilities: Yes
- Accessible: Yes—step-free access

Other information
- Status: Operational, premium station
- Station code: UFD
- Fare zone: Myki zone 2
- Website: Public Transport Victoria

History
- Opened: 8 October 1889; 137 years ago
- Closed: 13 July 1903 (original); 5 May 1956 (second)
- Rebuilt: 5 March 1928; 17 August 1959; 1963–1964
- Electrified: August 1959 (1500 V DC overhead)
- Former names: North Campbellfield (1889–1903; 1928-1956)

Passengers
- 2005–2006: 291,252
- 2006–2007: 331,504 ▲13.82%
- 2007–2008: 329,370 ▼0.64%
- 2008–2009: 369,930 ▲12.31%
- 2009–2010: 390,478 ▲5.55%
- 2010–2011: 344,048 ▼11.9%
- 2011–2012: 318,588 ▼7.4%
- 2012–2013: Not measured
- 2013–2014: 261,057 ▼18.06%
- 2014–2015: 257,659 ▼1.3%
- 2015–2016: 295,726 ▲14.77%
- 2016–2017: 290,940 ▼1.62%
- 2017–2018: 278,122 ▼4.41%
- 2018–2019: 366,300 ▲31.7%
- 2019–2020: 284,700 ▼22.28%
- 2020–2021: 147,300 ▼48.3%
- 2021–2022: 185,850 ▲26.17%

Services
Preceding station	Metro Trains	Following station
Gowrie towards Flinders Street	Upfield line	Terminus
Former services
Preceding station	VicRail	Following station
Campbellfield towards Fawkner	Fawkner-Somerton line	Somerton Terminus
List of closed railway stations in Melbourne
Proposed services
Preceding station	Metro Trains	Following station
Gowrie towards Flinders Street	Upfield line	Craigieburn towards Wallan
Track layout
Location

Upfield station is a railway station operated by Metro Trains Melbourne and the terminus of the Upfield line, part of the Melbourne rail network. It serves the northern suburb of Campbellfield in Melbourne, Victoria, Australia.

The station opened as North Campbellfield on 8 October 1889 and originally closed on 13 July 1903. It was reopened on 5 March 1928 and was closed again on 5 May 1956. It was reopened yet again on 17 August 1959 and renamed Upfield.

== History ==
=== North Campbellfield (1889-1903; 1928-1956) ===
North Campbellfield station first opened when the railway from Coburg was extended to Somerton in October 1889. In 1903, the line was truncated back to Coburg and the station was closed. In 1928, the line from Fawkner to Somerton was reopened, and North Campbellfield was reinstated as a stop on the newly reinstated passenger service, which was hauled by an AEC railmotor. The passenger service lasted until 1956, after which the line beyond Fawkner was closed for the second time and North Campbellfield station was demolished.

=== Upfield (1959 - present) ===
In 1959, the line from Fawkner to Somerton was reopened in conjunction with the extension of the electrification and suburban service from Fawkner to a new station near the site of North Campbellfield. The new station was given the name of Upfield - which is a reference to the open country in the area at the time of its reopening, and was built primarily to serve workers at the nearby Ford factory, which occupied the large site to the north of the station.

During 1963–1964, the present station building was constructed. In 1965, flashing light signals were provided at the Barry Road level crossing, located at the up end of the station.

In January 1997, the line from Upfield to the nearby Ford sidings was deemed unsuitable for traffic and was booked out of use. In that same year, a train stabling yard was opened to the north of the station, and a signal panel was installed. In 1998, boom barriers were provided at the Barry Road level crossing, as part of upgrade works along the Upfield line.

During 2002–2003, the station was refurbished and, in December 2007, Upfield was upgraded to a premium station. In 2011, an extra stabling siding (Siding "A") was provided.

Under the 2013 PTV Network Development Plan, the section of the line between Upfield and Roxburgh Park was to be reinstated, and was to include a flyover across the North East standard gauge line. That would allow V/Line Seymour services to operate via Upfield, and would facilitate the eventual electrification of the line to Wallan.

On 30 June 2019, the Upfield signal panel was abolished, and control was transferred to Metrol.

== Platforms and services ==
Upfield has one side platform and is served by Upfield line trains.

Upfield platform arrangement
Platform	Line	Destination	Via	Service Type	Notes	Source
1	Upfield line	Flinders Street	City Loop	All stations	See City Loop for operating patterns	

== Transport links ==
CDC Melbourne operates two routes via Upfield station, under contract to Transport Victoria:

- 531 : to North Coburg
- 532 : Craigieburn station – Broadmeadows station

Kinetic Melbourne operates one bus route to and from Upfield station, under contract to Transport Victoria:

- 540 : to Broadmeadows station
