= Craigieburn railway station =

Railway station in Melbourne, Australia

Craigieburn
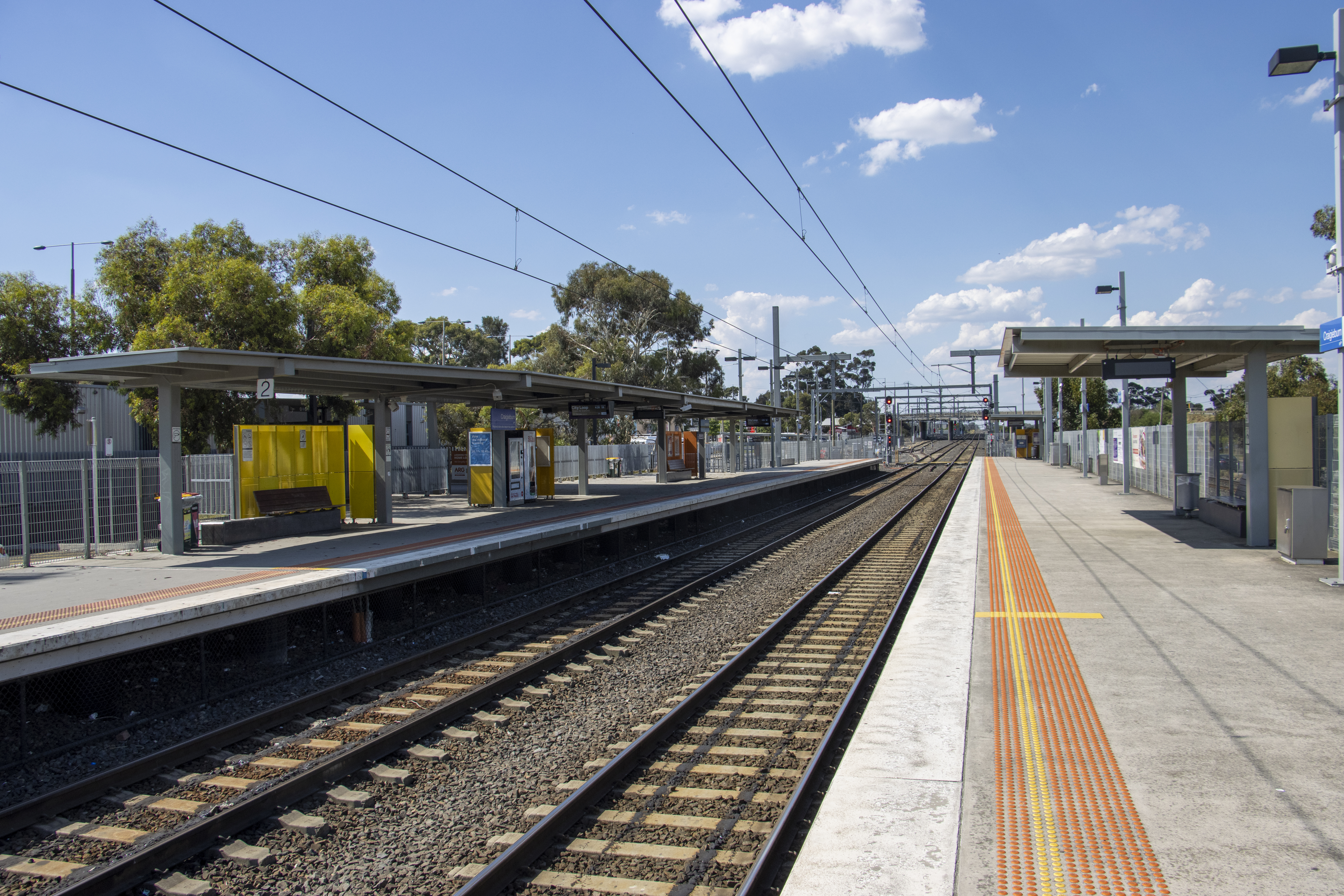
- Northbound view from Platform 1, December 2022

General information
- Location: Potter Street, Craigieburn, Victoria 3064; City of Hume; Australia
- Coordinates: 37°36′10″S 144°56′35″E
- System: PTV commuter rail station
- Owner: VicTrack
- Operator: Metro Trains; V/Line
- Lines: Craigieburn; Seymour (Tocumwal)
- Distance: 26.10 kilometres from Southern Cross
- Platforms: 2 side
- Tracks: 3
- Connections: Bus

Construction
- Structure type: Ground
- Parking: 100
- Cycle facilities: Yes
- Accessible: Yes – step-free access

Other information
- Status: Operational, premium station
- Station code: CGB
- Fare zone: Myki zone 2
- Website: Public Transport Victoria

History
- Opened: 22 July 1872; 154 years ago
- Rebuilt: 30 September 2007; 2006-2010 (24 May 2010)
- Electrified: July 2007 (1500 V DC overhead)

Passengers
2005–2018 numbers
2005–2006	169,269
2006–2007	169,071 ▼0.11%
2007–2008	401,043 ▲137.2%
2008–2009	575,924 ▲43.6%
2009–2010	622,903 ▲8.15%
2010–2011	698,491 ▲12.13%
2011–2012	741,715 ▲6.18%
2012–2013	Not measured
2013–2014	822,852 ▲10.93%
2014–2015	879,187 ▲6.84%
2015–2016	1,003,661 ▲14.15%
2016–2017	1,080,959 ▲7.7%
2017–2018	1,162,477 ▲7.54%
- 2018–2019: 1,236,243 ▲6.34%
- 2019–2020: 1,126,250 ▼8.89%
- 2020–2021: 560,500 ▼50.23%
- 2021–2022: 696,300 ▲24.22%
- 2022–2023: 1,110,800 ▲59.53%
- 2023–2024: 1,418,700 ▲27.72%
- 2024–2025: 1,508,250 ▲6.31%

Services
Preceding station	Metro Trains	Following station
Roxburgh Park towards Flinders Street	Craigieburn line	Terminus
Preceding station	V/Line	Following station
Broadmeadows towards Southern Cross	Seymour line	Donnybrook towards Seymour
Broadmeadows One-way operation	Shepparton line 1 weekday early morning service	Donnybrook towards Shepparton
Track layout
Location

Craigieburn station is a railway station operated by Metro Trains Melbourne and V/Line railway station on the Craigieburn line and regional Seymour line, part of the Melbourne and Victorian rail networks. It serves the northern suburb of Craigieburn in Melbourne, Victoria, Australia. Craigieburn is a ground level premium station, featuring two side platforms. It opened on 22 July 1872, with the current platform 1 provided in 2007 and platform 2 provided in 2010.

== History ==
The railway through Craigieburn originally opened in 1872, as part of the North East line to School House Lane. When the station opened, there was a small timber station building, which was replaced by a larger building in 1878, having the same design as other small stations on the line. In 1874, the station opened to goods traffic. In 1920, a larger timber station building was constructed on Platform 1.

The station originally had a passing loop, which was used regularly to cross trains until the line was duplicated in 1886. In 1899, a lever frame was provided on the down platform, which was moved to the new station building in 1922. A number of goods sidings were provided at the station, with the last siding removed in 1982. In 1961, the old Hume Highway road overpass opened, replacing a level crossing, as part of the construction of the North East standard gauge project. In 1975, the former sheep and cattle races at the station were abolished. In 1988, the signal box was closed, all signals were removed, and the station was abolished as a block post. In 1996, a small building was constructed on Platform 1, housing a kiosk and ticket facilities.

In 2007, the station was rebuilt as a premium station, as part of the extension of electrified services from Broadmeadows, with a signal box, stabling sidings and a crossover also provided. On 30 September of that year, former suburban train operator Connex began services to and from the station.

In March 2009, Platform 1 was demolished and rebuilt to a similar design to Platform 2. The track on Platform 1 was also electrified, and additional crossovers were provided at the up and down ends of the station, to allow down trains to diverge to the up line.

On 4 May 2010, a collision between a Comeng train set and a Kilmore East-bound quarry train, hauled by Pacific National locomotive G524, occurred between Roxburgh Park and Craigieburn.

=== Train maintenance facility ===
On 9 April 2012, a new train maintenance facility, located to the north of the station, was officially opened by then Minister for Public Transport, Terry Mulder. The $220 million facility consists of a stabling yard and large maintenance depot to accommodate up to 25 trains, along with staff facilities, train wash and additional support equipment.

== Platforms and services ==
Craigieburn has two side platforms. It is served by Craigieburn line trains and V/Line Seymour line trains. Suburban services generally use Platform 2, with northbound V/Line services often crossing to Platform 1 to pass suburban trains.

=== Metropolitan ===
Craigieburn platform arrangement
Platform	Line	Destination	Via	Service Type	Notes	Source
1	Craigieburn line	Flinders Street	City Loop	All stations	See City Loop for operating patterns	
2	Craigieburn line	Flinders Street	City Loop	All stations	See City Loop for operating patterns	

=== Regional ===
Craigieburn platform arrangement
Platform	Line	Destination	Service Type	Notes
1	Seymour line Shepparton line	Southern Cross	One weekday early morning V/Line service (Shepparton)	Set down only
2	Seymour line Shepparton line	Seymour, Shepparton	One weekday early morning V/Line service (Shepparton)	Pick up only

== Transport links ==
Ten bus routes operate to and from Craigieburn station, under contract to Transport Victoria:

- 390 : to Mernda station (operated by Kinetic Melbourne)
- 501 : to Donnybrook station (operated by CDC Melbourne)
- 525 : to Donnybrook station (operated by CDC Melbourne)
- 528 : to Craigieburn Central Shopping Centre (operated by CDC Melbourne)
- 529 : to Craigieburn North (operated by CDC Melbourne)
- 532 : to Broadmeadows station (operated by CDC Melbourne)
- 533 : to Craigieburn North (operated by CDC Melbourne)
- 537 : to Craigieburn Central Shopping Centre (operated by CDC Melbourne)
- 544 : to Roxburgh Park station (operated by CDC Melbourne)
- 511 : to Mandalay, Beveridge (operated by CDC Melbourne)

== Gallery ==
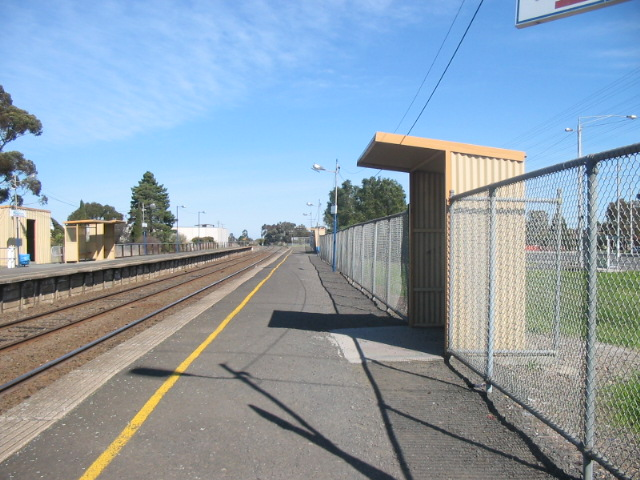
Southbound view from Platform 2, before the commencement of upgrade works, August 2005

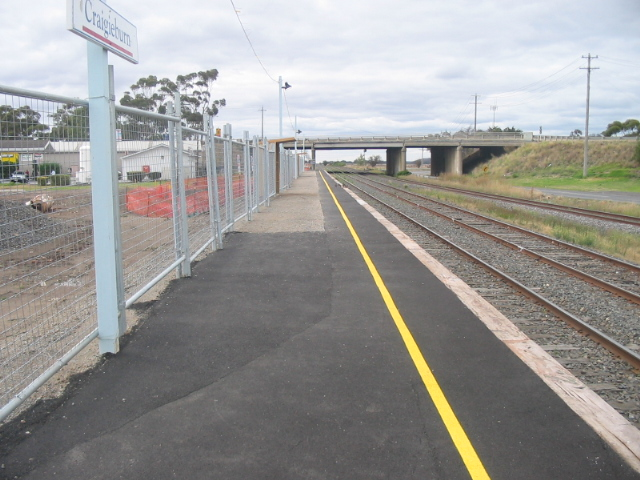
Northbound view of the temporary Platform 2, built to the north of the station during upgrade works, April 2006

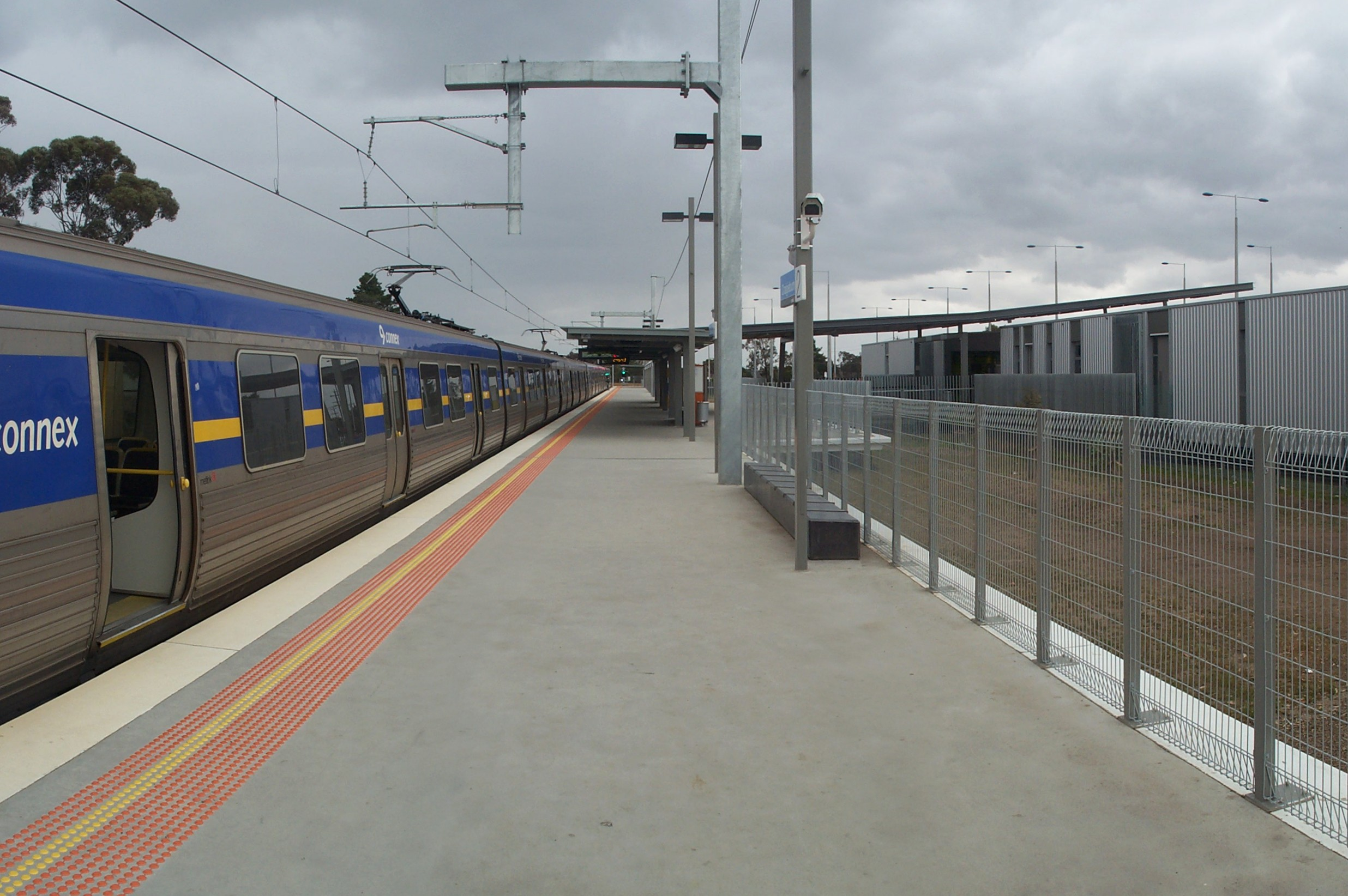
Southbound view from Platform 2,
September 2007

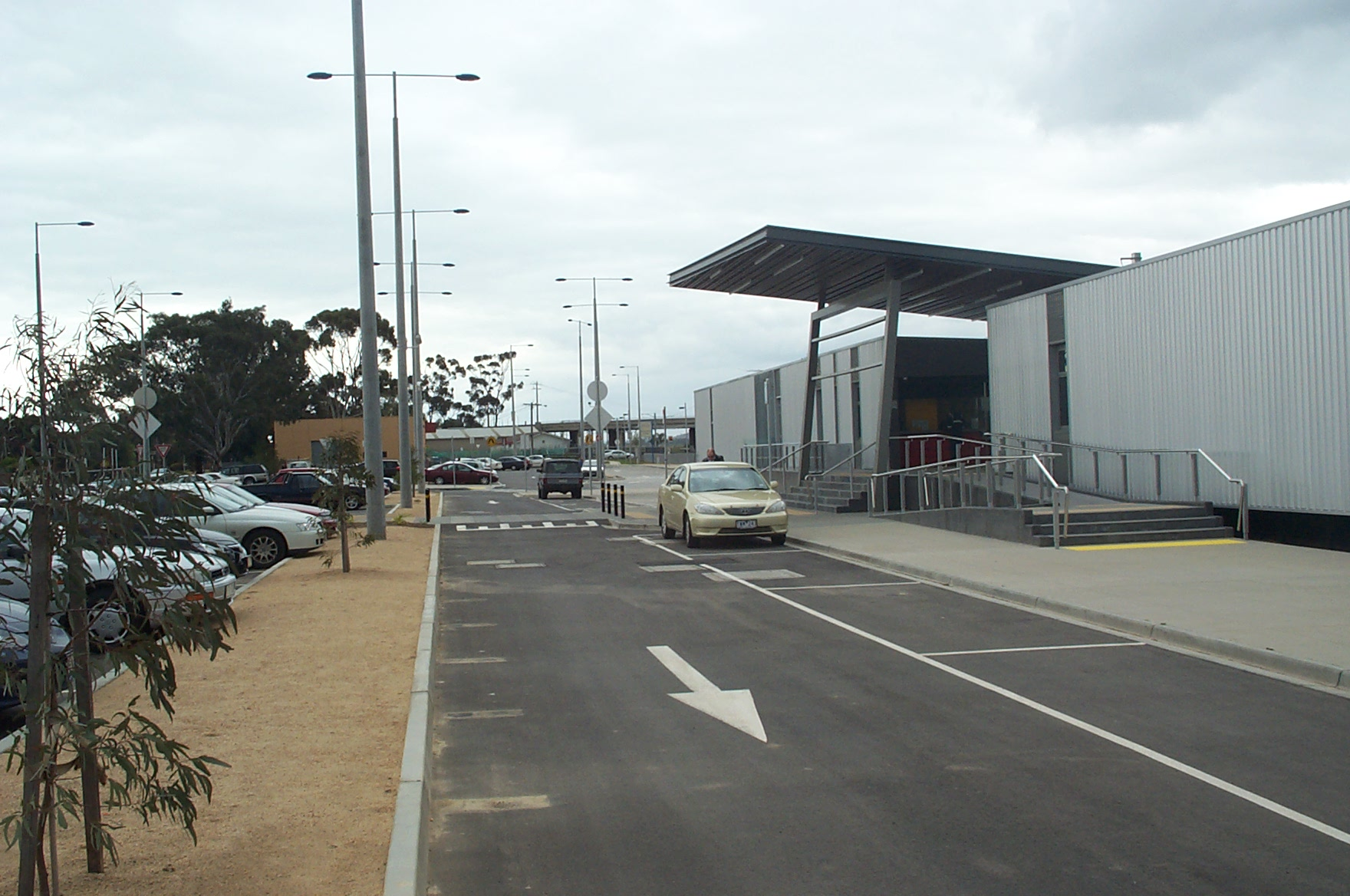
Station forecourt and entrance, September 2007

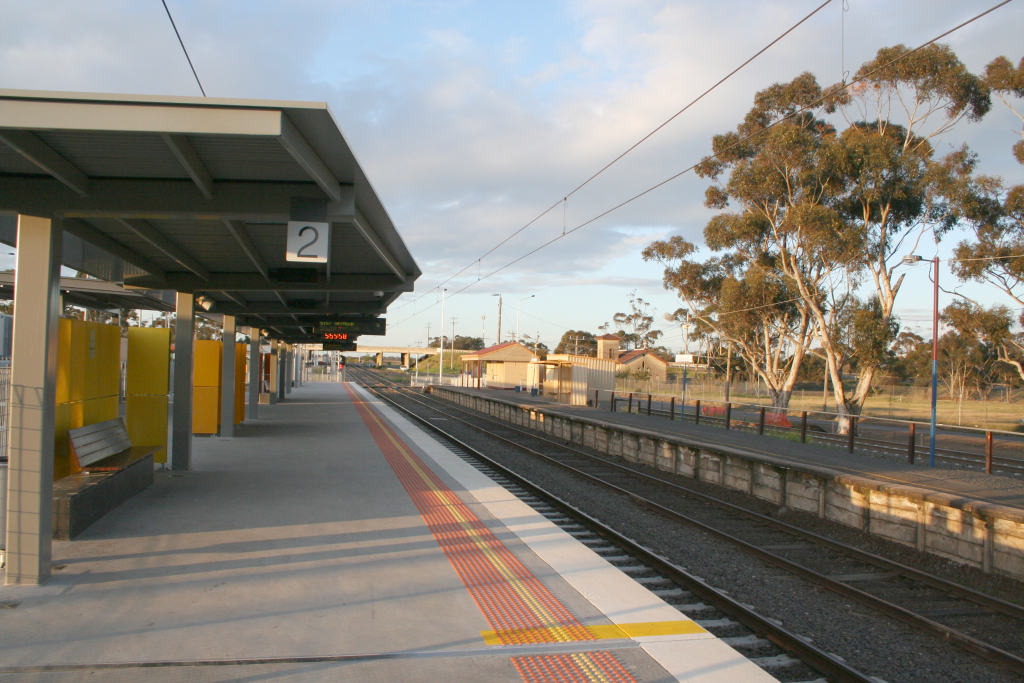
Northbound view from Platform 2, October 2007

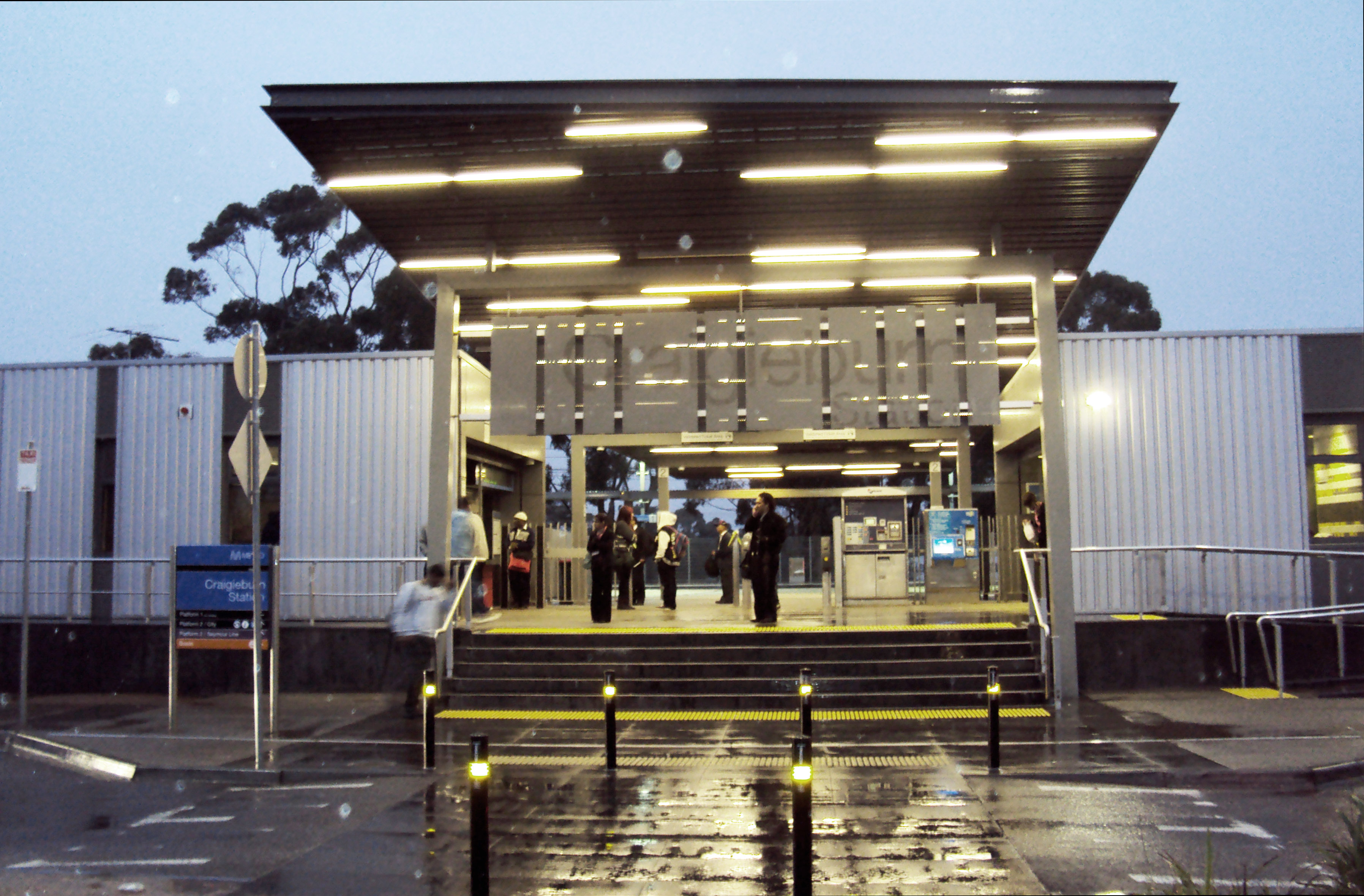
Station forecourt and entrance to Platform 2,
April 2011

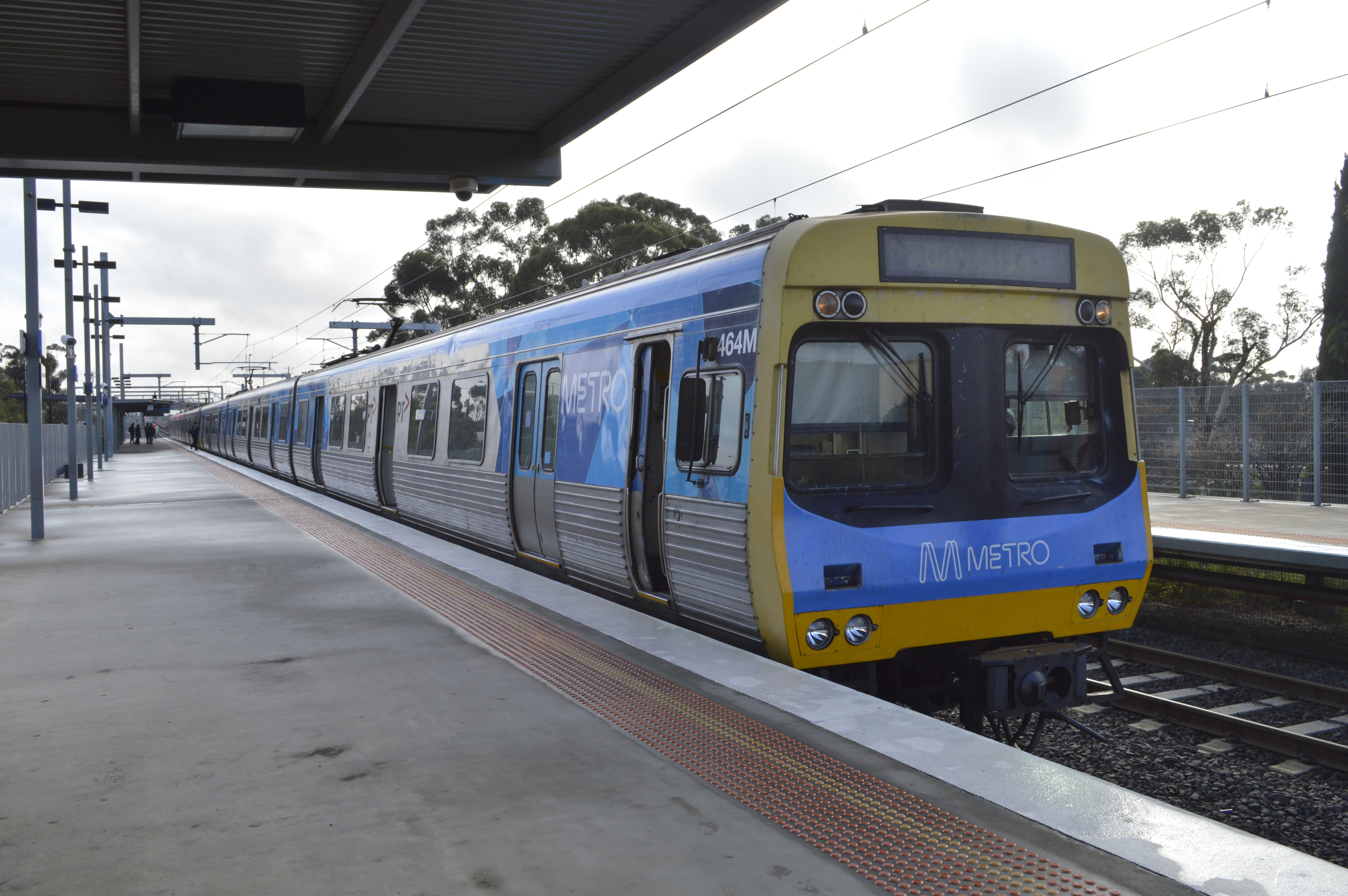
A Comeng train awaits to commence a Flinders Street-bound service from Platform 2, April 2014

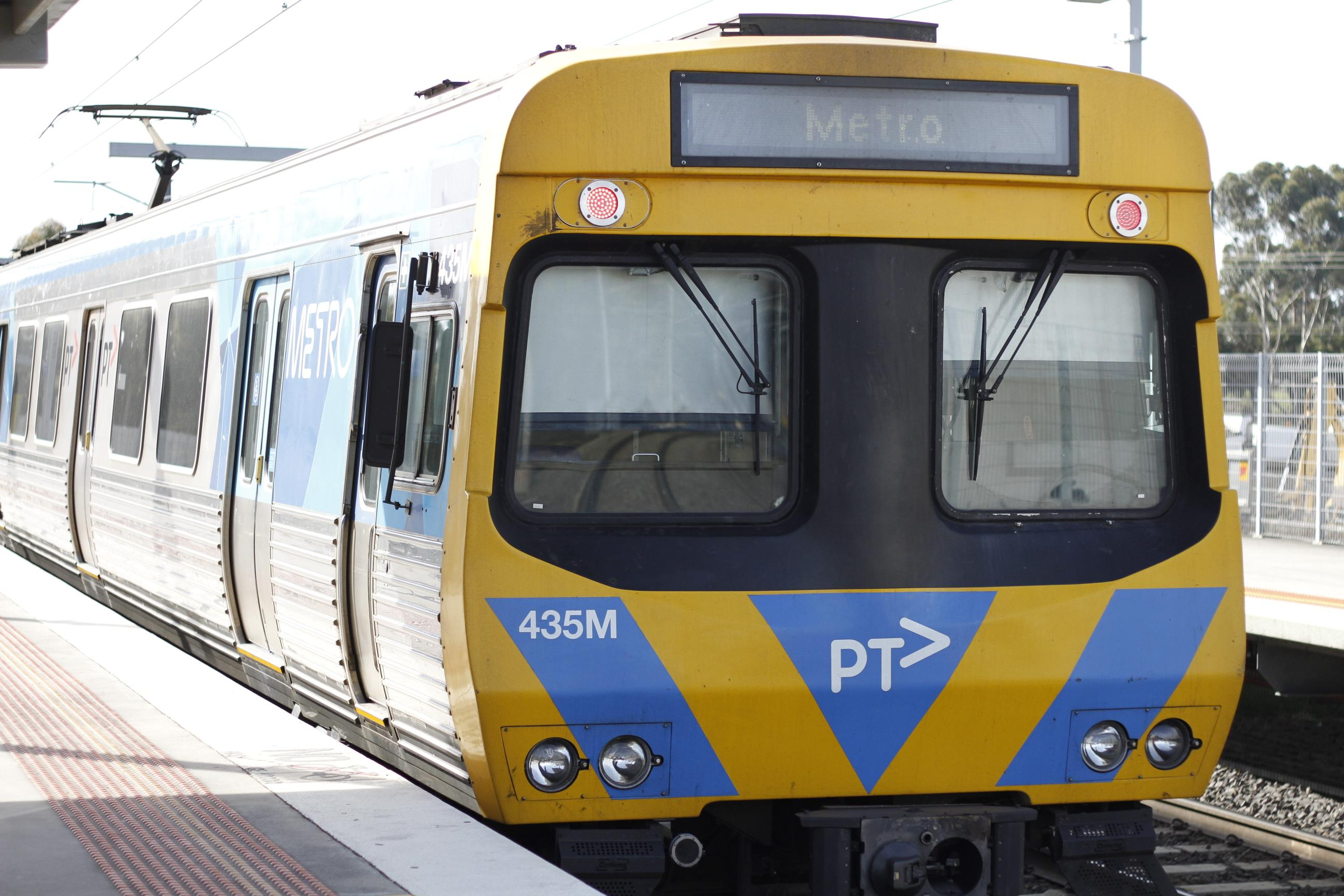
A Comeng train waits on Platform 2, February 2025
