= Roxburgh Park railway station =

Railway station in Melbourne, Australia

Roxburgh Park
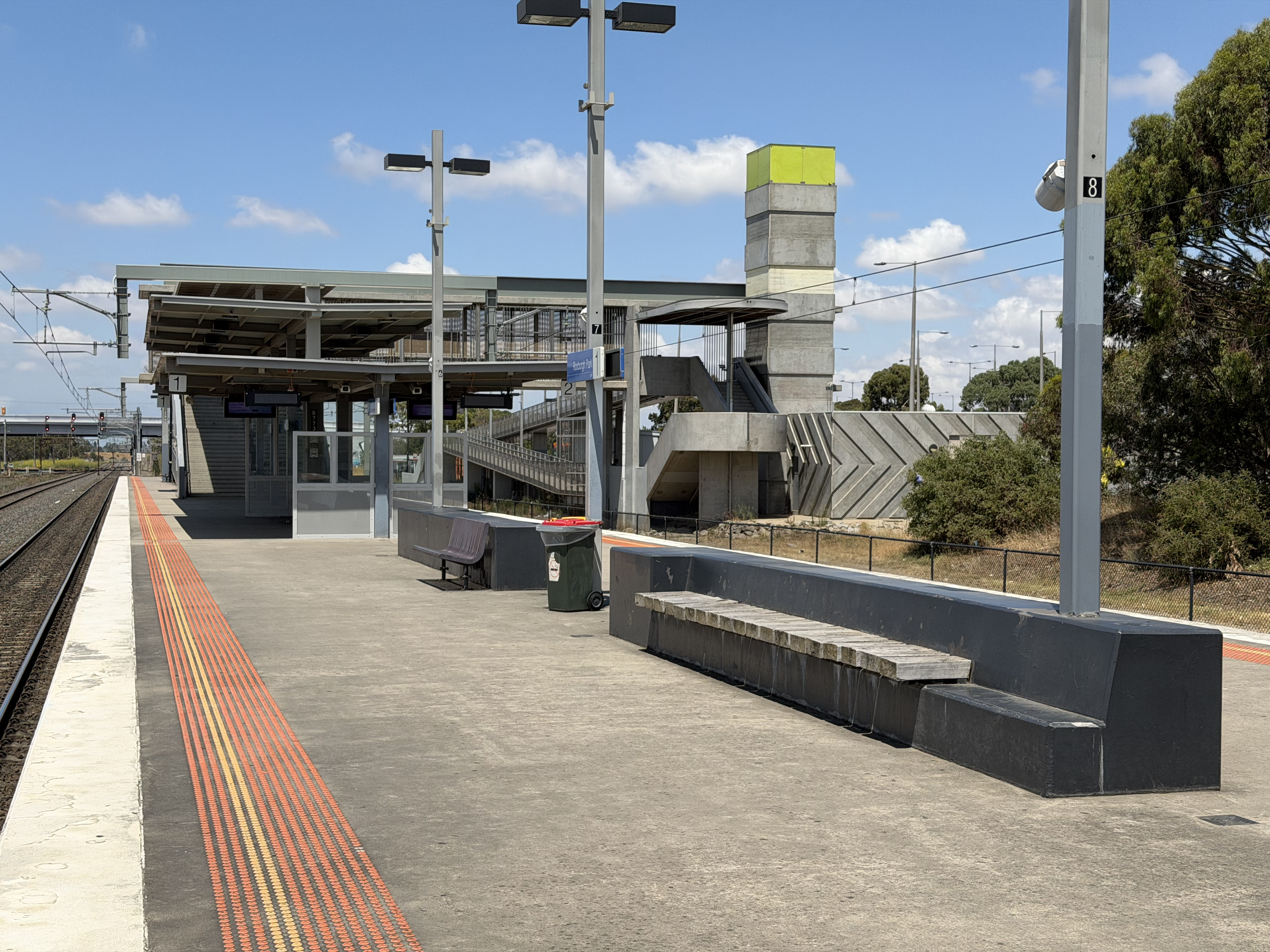
- Southbound view from Platform 1, January 2026

General information
- Location: Thomas Brunton Parade, Roxburgh Park, Victoria 3064; City of Hume; Australia
- Coordinates: 37°38′18″S 144°56′07″E
- System: PTV commuter rail station
- Owner: VicTrack
- Operator: Metro Trains
- Line: Craigieburn
- Distance: 22.00 kilometres from Southern Cross
- Platforms: 2 (1 island)
- Tracks: 4
- Connections: Bus

Construction
- Structure type: Ground
- Parking: 275
- Cycle facilities: Yes
- Accessible: Yes – step free access

Other information
- Status: Operational, unstaffed
- Station code: RXP
- Fare zone: Myki zone 2
- Website: Public Transport Victoria

History
- Opened: 21 September 2007; 18 years ago
- Electrified: July 2007 (1500 V DC overhead)

Passengers
2005–2018 numbers
2007–2008	259,688
2008–2009	427,300 ▲64.54%
2009–2010	451,815 ▲5.73%
2010–2011	482,477 ▲6.78%
2011–2012	462,696 ▼4.09%
2012–2013	Not measured
2013–2014	450,133 ▼2.71%
2014–2015	482,660 ▲7.22%
2015–2016	510,786 ▲5.82%
2016–2017	535,412 ▲4.82%
2017–2018	573,396 ▲7.09%
- 2018–2019: 574,990 ▲0.27%
- 2019–2020: 488,650 ▼15.01%
- 2020–2021: 240,050 ▼50.87%
- 2021–2022: 280,200 ▲16.72%
- 2022–2023: 433,550 ▲54.73%
- 2023–2024: 512,350 ▲18.17%

Services
Preceding station	Metro Trains	Following station
Coolaroo towards Flinders Street	Craigieburn line	Craigieburn Terminus
Former services
Preceding station	VicRail	Following station
North Campbellfield towards Fawkner	Fawkner-Somerton line	Terminus
List of closed railway stations in Melbourne
Track layout
Location

Roxburgh Park station is a railway station operated by Metro Trains Melbourne on the Craigieburn line, part of the Melbourne rail network. It serves the northern suburb of Roxburgh Park in Melbourne, Victoria, Australia. Roxburgh Park is a ground-level unstaffed station, featuring an island platform with two faces. It opened on 21 September 2007.

The station was provided as part of the extension of electrified services from Broadmeadows to Craigieburn. The North East-bound (down) line was slewed to the west, to permit an island platform to be built between the two tracks of the broad gauge main line. It was built just north of the site of the former Somerton station, which was closed to passengers in 1960. However, a standard gauge crossing loop to the east of the station retains the Somerton name, as did a former adjacent goods yard.

== History ==
=== Somerton (1881 - 1962) ===
Somerton opened to traffic as a single platform on 15 May 1881. In 1886, it gained an additional platform, when the line between Broadmeadows and Donnybrook was duplicated. On 8 October 1889, Somerton became a junction, when what is now the Upfield line was opened from North Melbourne northwards through Coburg. The station's first signal box, with a 38 lever frame, was also provided. That line was closed to traffic from the Somerton end on 13 July 1903.

The line through Coburg, then terminating at Fawkner, was reopened on 5 March 1928, but no junction was provided at Somerton. Instead, the AEC railmotor that operated the service was turned using a turntable to the south of the station. This situation remained until 5 May 1956, when the line from Fawkner was again closed.

On 19 July 1959, the line from Somerton to Upfield was reopened for freight traffic, to serve the then newly built Ford Motor Company factory. A new signal box with a 25 lever frame was provided, working a facing crossover and the connection between the main line and the sidings. On 17 August of that year, suburban services were extended to Upfield from the city side. On 6 December 1960, Somerton was closed to passengers, although only the city-bound platform was demolished in October of that year. However, additional freight sidings were provided in the Somerton area throughout the 1960s.

Construction of the Melbourne – Sydney standard gauge line also commenced at that time, opening for traffic in 1962, with the freight line from Somerton to Upfield converted to dual gauge in early 1963. Occurring in that year, parts of the out-bound platform were demolished, leaving the platform face remaining. In 1988, a dual-gauge siding was provided to serve nearby cement silos and, in 1989, the platform face of the out-bound platform was removed.

In 1998, Austrak commenced development of a container terminal, as part of a larger "freight village", with a number of major companies entered into long-term tenancies for warehouses at the site. In 2000, the crossing loop on the standard gauge line was extended at the down end and, in 2004, Austrak entered into a lease with P&O Trans Australia to operate the terminal. The Somerton terminal had four 750-metre dual-gauge rail sidings, with connections northwards on both gauges.

In 2023, construction commenced on the Somerton Intermodal Terminal to the east of the station.

=== Roxburgh Park (2007 - Present) ===
Roxburgh Park officially opened on 21 September 2007, but services to and from the station did not commence until 30 September of that year. The station was opened by the then Victorian Premier John Brumby, the then Minister for Public Transport Lynne Kosky, and the then MLA for Yuroke, Liz Beattie.

On 4 May 2010, a collision between a Comeng train set and a Kilmore East-bound quarry train, hauled by Pacific National locomotive G524, occurred between Roxburgh Park and Craigieburn.

== Platforms and services ==
Roxburgh Park has one island platform with two faces. It is served by Craigieburn line trains.

Roxburgh Park platform arrangement
Platform	Line	Destination	Via	Service Type	Notes	Source
1	Craigieburn line	Flinders Street	City Loop	All stations	See City Loop for operating patterns	
2	Craigieburn line	Craigieburn		All stations		

== Transport links ==
Six bus routes operate via Roxburgh Park station, under contract to Public Transport Victoria:

- 484 : to Broadmeadows station (operated by CDC Melbourne)
- 541 : Broadmeadows station – Craigieburn North (operated by CDC Melbourne)
- 542 : to Pascoe Vale station (operated by CDC Melbourne)
- 543 : to Greenvale Gardens (operated by CDC Melbourne)
- 544 : to Craigieburn station (operated by CDC Melbourne)
- SmartBus 901 : Frankston station – Melbourne Airport (operated by Kinetic Melbourne)

== Gallery ==
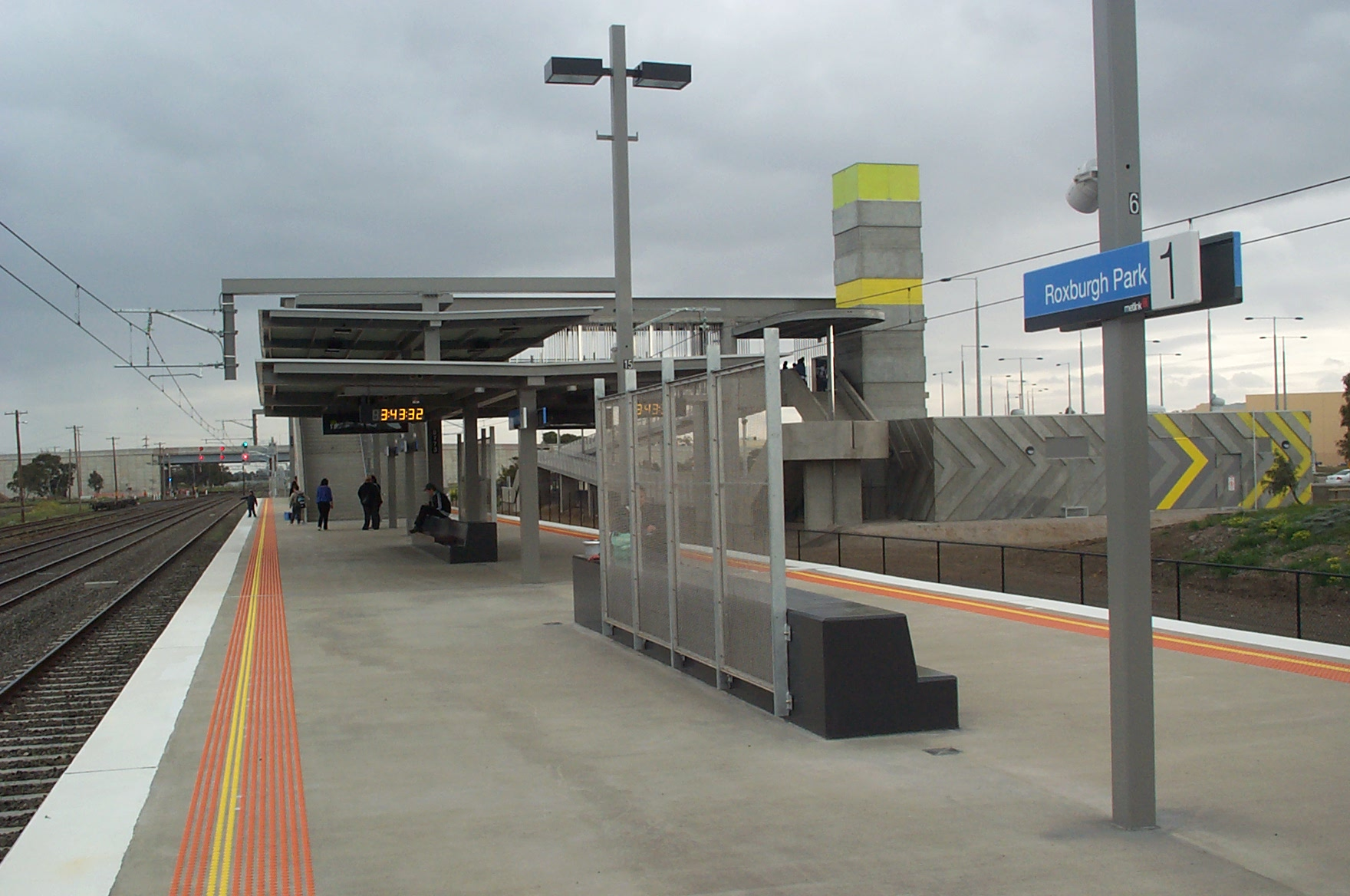
Southbound view from Platform 1, September 2007

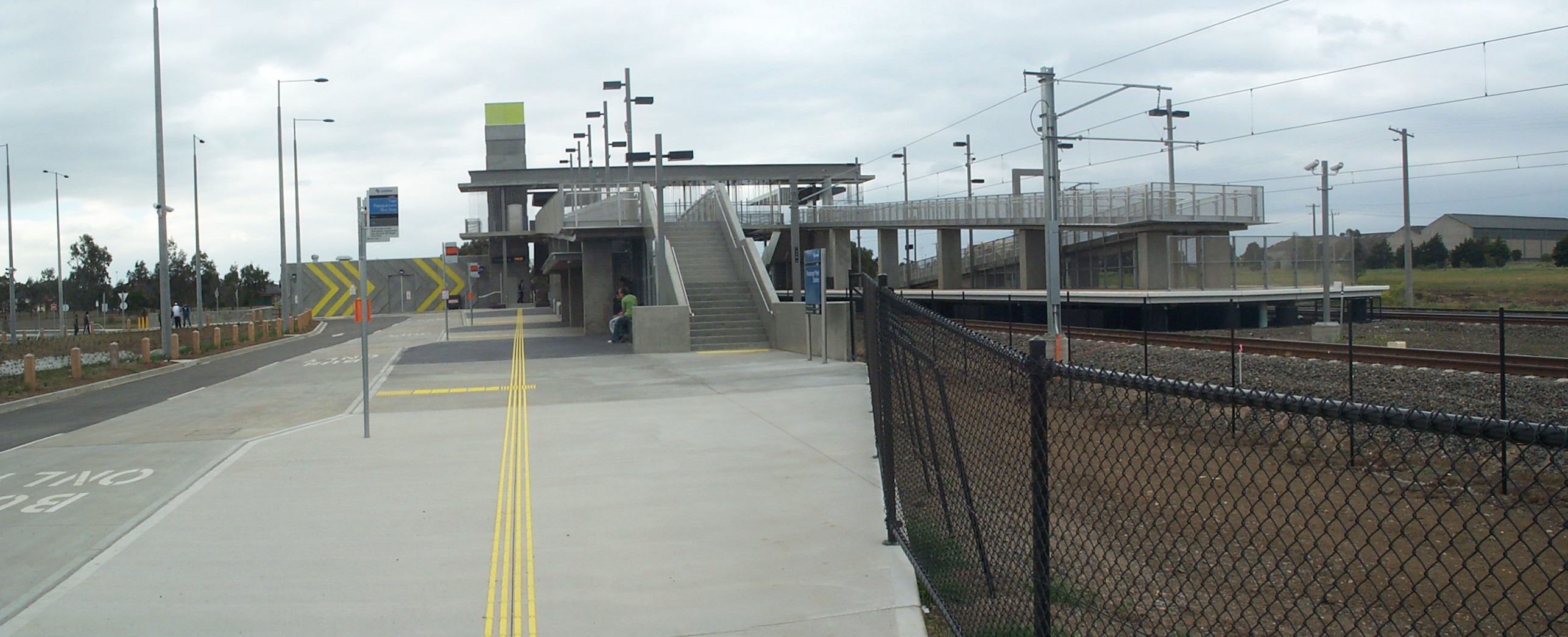
Station forecourt and bus interchange,
September 2007

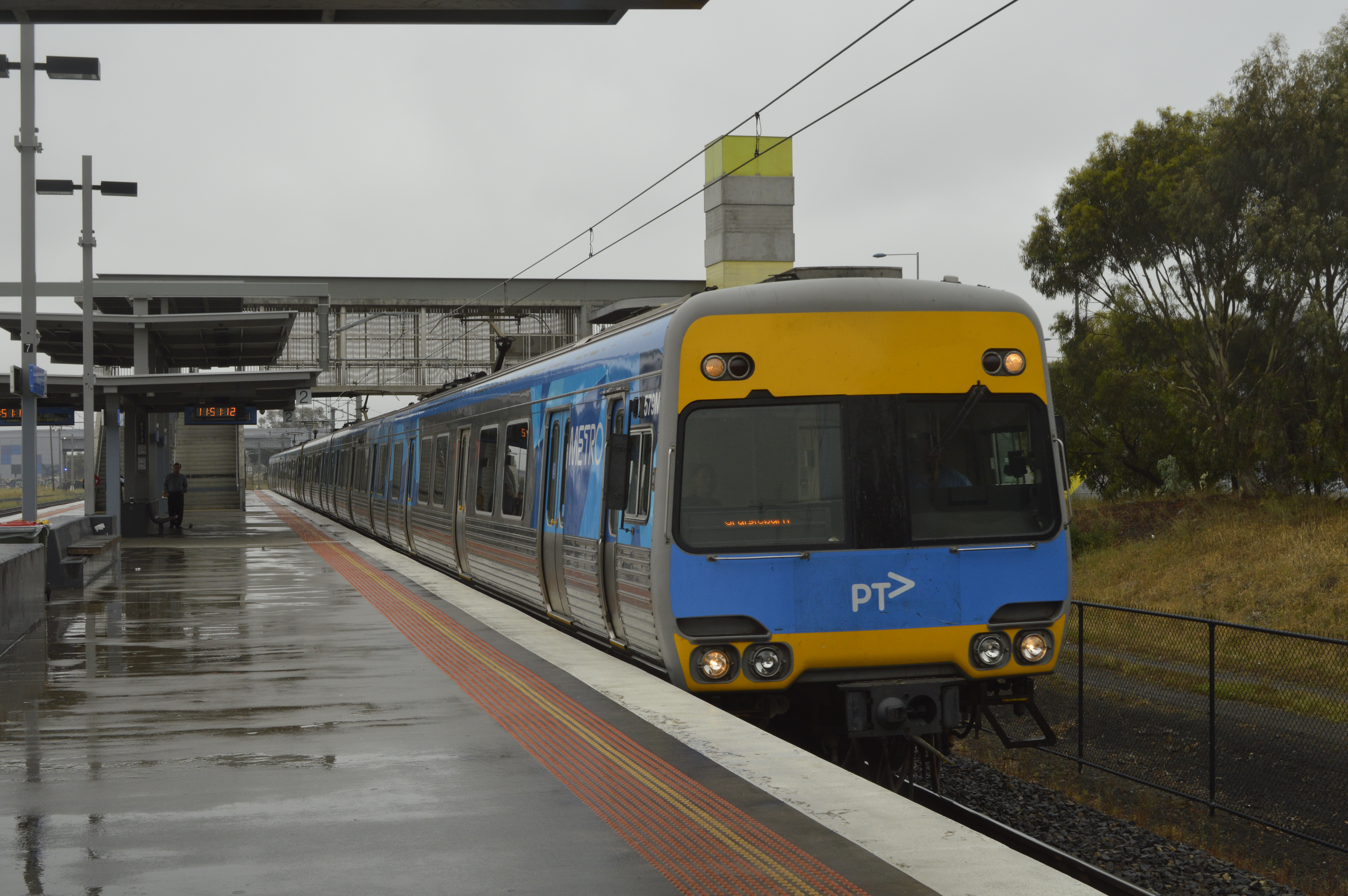
A Comeng train on a Craigieburn-bound service arrives at Platform 2, January 2015
