= Dysart railway station =

Former railway station in Victoria, Australia

Coordinates: 37°3′16″S 145°6′53″E

Dysart
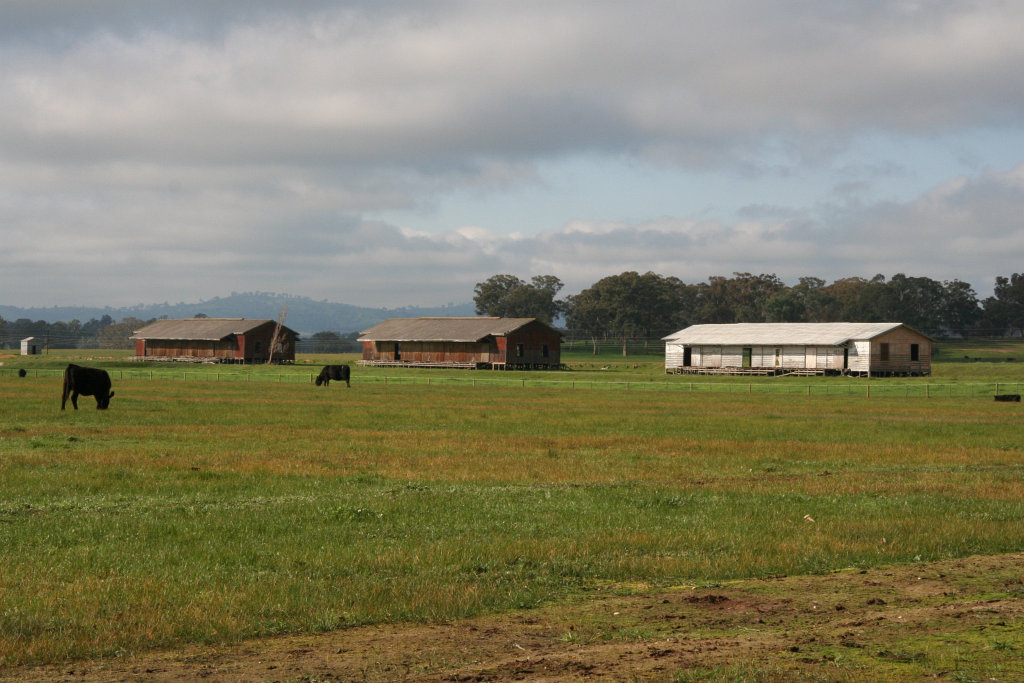
- Goods sheds viewed from the south-west

General information
- Line: North East railway

Other information
- Status: Closed

History
- Opened: Various, from 1872 to 1941
- Closed: Various, from 1872 to 1987

Services
Preceding station	V/Line	Following station
Tallarook towards Southern Cross	North East line	Seymour towards Albury
List of closed railway stations in Victoria
Location

Dysart was the name given to a sequence of railway locations on the North East railway beside the Goulburn River south of Seymour, Victoria, Australia. The others were School House Lane, Dysart Siding, Dysart Defence Sidings and Goulburn Junction.

== School House Lane ==
School House Lane was the first terminus of the North East railway, opened as a temporary terminus as the girders for the Goulburn River bridge had not yet arrived from England. Located at 59 miles, 20 chains (95.4 kilometres) from Spencer Street it was open for public services between 18 April – 28 August 1872, and was provided with passenger and goods platforms, an engine shed, ash pit, water supply, and a derrick crane. A station building was provided, as well as a tent with brick chimney for the station master. After the line was extended into Seymour station, School House Lane was closed.

== Dysart Siding ==
Dysart Siding was located on the Seymour side of the School House Lane level crossing, 94.9 kilometres from Spencer Street. Opened under the name "School House Lane" for firewood traffic on 4 February 1889 it was renamed Dysart on 5 December 1904. The siding was on the eastern side of the main line, and connected to both the up and down lines, the connection to the down line being abolished in March 1889. Final closure came on 6 July 1943.

== Goulburn Junction ==
The first Goulburn Junction signal box was at 95.4 kilometres from Spencer Street. Just south of the Goulburn River bridge, it was opened in October 1886 to control the points and signals at the end of the double line from Melbourne. The double line was not continued further north into Seymour due to the cost of duplicating the river bridge. In August 1925 the signal box was abolished when remote control was provided from Seymour "A" signal box, and the junction itself was eliminated in May 1942 when the double line was extended over a new bridge into Seymour, to the west of the existing bridge.

Goulburn Junction reappeared in 1961 when the parallel standard gauge line was opened, using the eastern bridge to cross the Goulburn River. As a result, the broad gauge was reduced to one track, the transition between double and single track being 96.1 kilometres from Spencer Street, and controlled from Seymour "A" signal box.

== Dysart Defence Sidings ==
95.8 kilometres from Spencer Street station, the Dysart Defence Sidings opened on 15 July 1941 to serve Puckapunyal and other army camps in the area during World War II. Located on the eastern side of the line, three sheds were situated along a goods platform. A signal box was provided in 1942 to control the junction of the main line and the sidings, which saw little use after the war. However they remained in operation until May 1987, when the sidings were closed and later removed.
