= Batman railway station =

Railway station in Melbourne, Australia

Batman
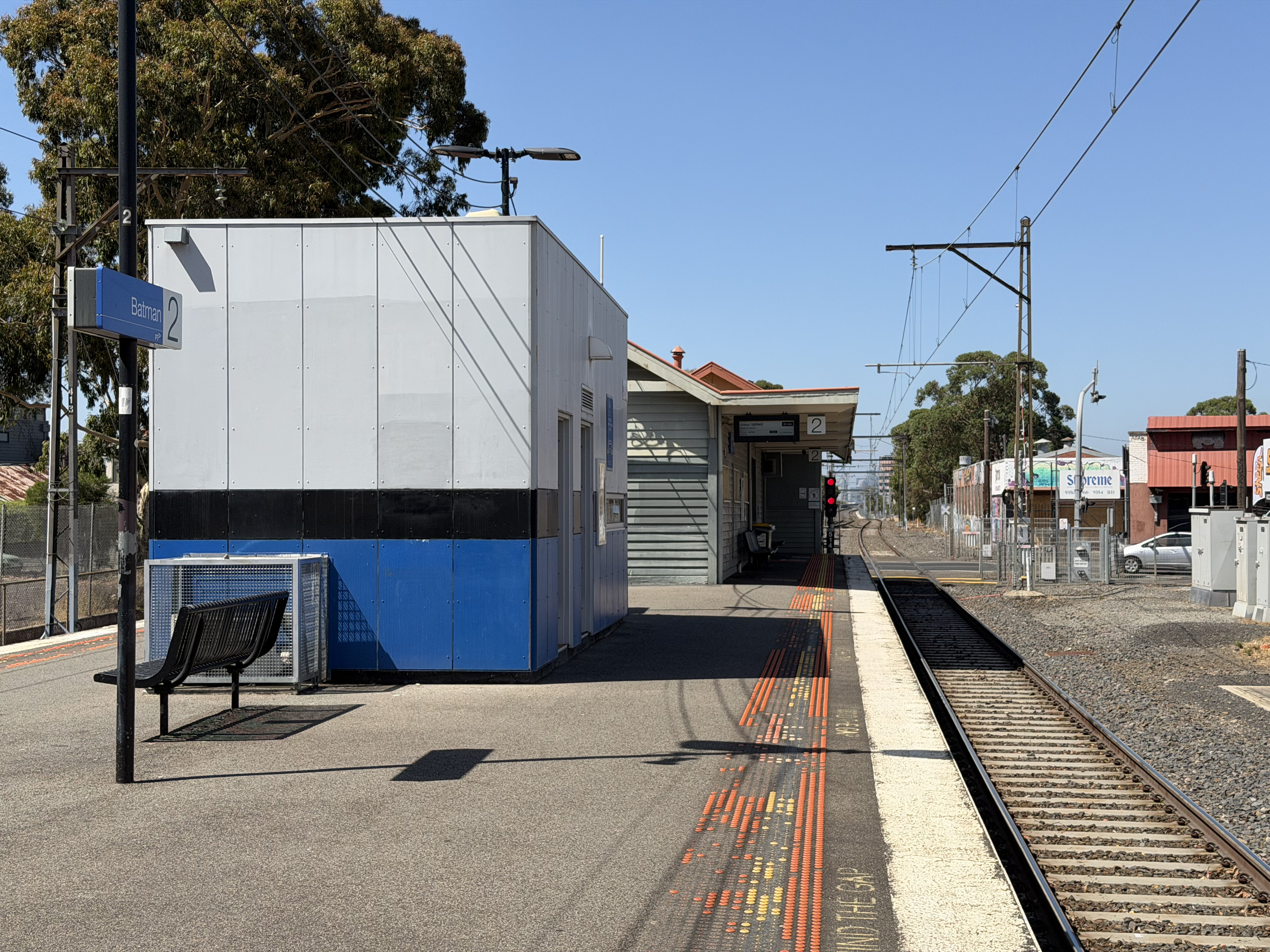
- Southbound view from Platform 2, February 2026

General information
- Location: Gaffney Street, Coburg North, Victoria 3058; City of Merri-bek; Australia
- Coordinates: 37°44′01″S 144°57′46″E
- System: PTV commuter rail station
- Owner: VicTrack
- Operator: Metro Trains
- Line: Upfield
- Distance: 11.23 kilometres from Southern Cross
- Platforms: 2 (1 island)
- Tracks: 2
- Connections: Bus; Tram

Construction
- Structure type: Ground
- Accessible: Yes—step-free access

Other information
- Status: Operational, unstaffed
- Station code: BAT
- Fare zone: Myki zone 1/2
- Website: Public Transport Victoria

History
- Opened: 8 October 1889; 137 years ago
- Closed: 13 July 1903
- Rebuilt: 1 October 1914; 19 July 1959
- Electrified: December 1920 (1500 V DC overhead)
- Former names: Bell Park (1889–1914)

Passengers
- 2005–2006: 199,821
- 2006–2007: 223,679 ▲11.94%
- 2007–2008: 261,378 ▲16.85%
- 2008–2009: 319,489 ▲22.23%
- 2009–2010: 332,657 ▲4.12%
- 2010–2011: 313,373 ▼5.8%
- 2011–2012: 285,973 ▼8.74%
- 2012–2013: Not measured
- 2013–2014: 275,893 ▼3.52%
- 2014–2015: 282,300 ▲2.32%
- 2015–2016: 281,380 ▼0.32%
- 2016–2017: 313,018 ▲11.24%
- 2017–2018: 294,110 ▼6.04%
- 2018–2019: 334,900 ▲13.87%
- 2019–2020: 257,000 ▼23.26%
- 2020–2021: 116,250 ▼54.8%
- 2021–2022: 142,200 ▲22.32%
- 2022–2023: 185,900 ▲30.73%
- 2023–2024: 222,650 ▲19.77%
- 2024–2025: 228,750 ▲2.74%

Services
Preceding station	Metro Trains	Following station
Coburg towards Flinders Street	Upfield line	Merlynston towards Upfield
Track layout
Location

Batman station is a railway station operated by Metro Trains Melbourne on the Upfield line, part of the Melbourne rail network. It serves the northern suburb of Coburg North in Melbourne, Victoria, Australia. Batman station is a ground level unstaffed station, featuring an island platform. It originally opened on 8 October 1889 as Bell Park, with the current station provided in 1959. It initially closed on 13 July 1903, but reopened with the current name on 1 October 1914.

== History ==
Bell Park station opened in 1889 when the railway line was extended from Coburg to Somerton. The station was closed in 1903 when the line was cut back to Coburg but in 1906, the line reopened for traffic to the newly-opened Fawkner Cemetery. In 1914 the passenger service was re-extended to Fawkner and Bell Park station was reopened as Batman – taking its name from one of the founders of Melbourne, John Batman.

In 1920, a siding for the former Lincoln Mills knitting works on Gaffney Street was provided. In 1959, the current island platform was provided as part of works to duplicate the line from Coburg to Fawkner.

In 1970, the siding serving the Lincoln Mills knitting works was abolished, along with the associated signal discs and posts. In 1982, a crossover at the station was abolished, along with a number of signals and levers.

There is a disused signal box at the up end of the station, which was provided in 1935, controlling interlocked gates at the Gaffney Street level crossing. In 1998, the gates were replaced with boom barriers, when the Upfield line was upgraded.

== Platforms and services ==
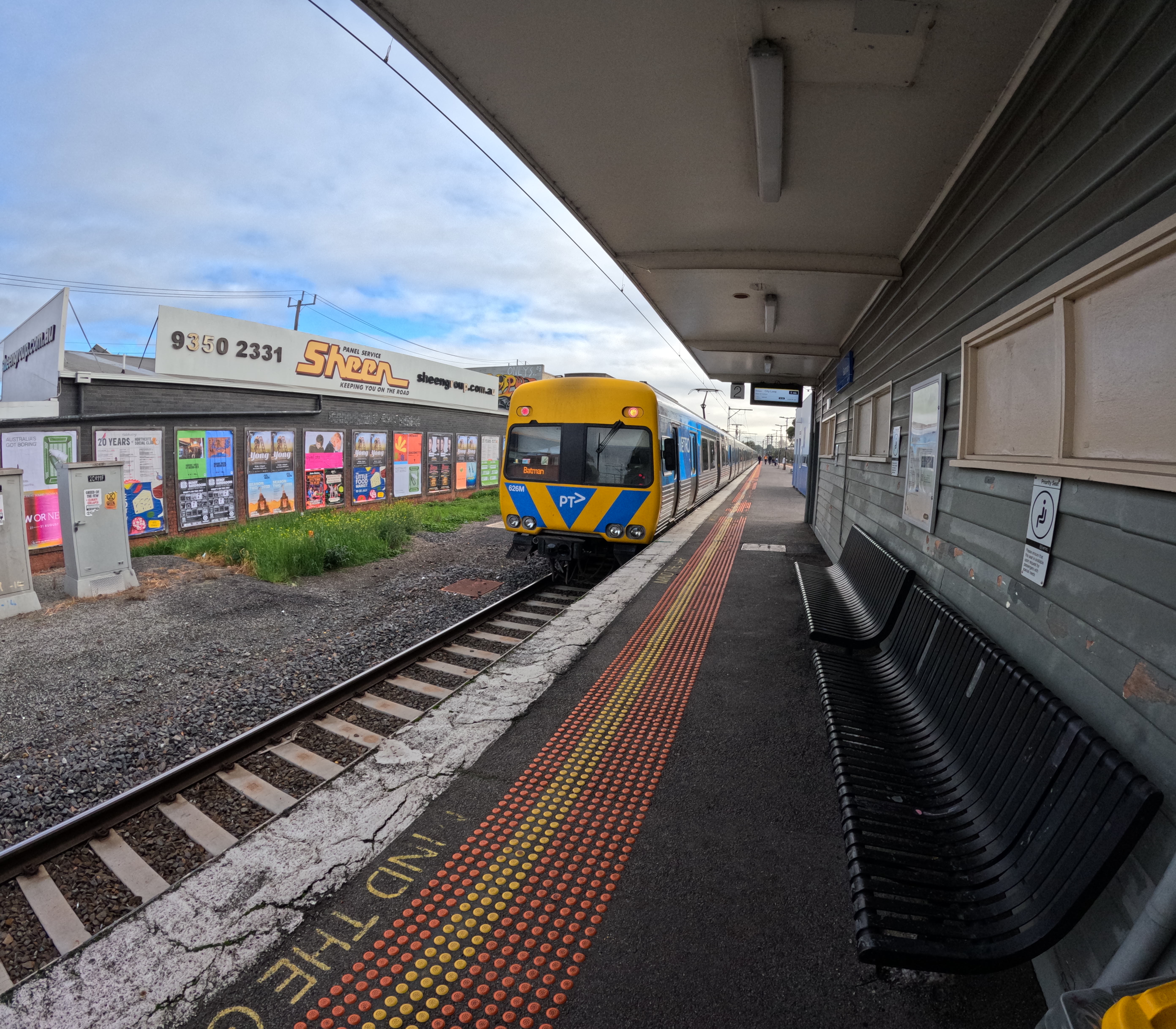
Alstom Comeng 626M Terminating at Batman after arriving from the Inner City.

Batman has one island platform with two faces. It is served by Upfield line trains.

Batman platform arrangement
Platform	Line	Destination	Via	Service Type	Notes	Source
1	Upfield line	Flinders Street	City Loop	All stations	See City Loop for operating patterns	
2	Upfield line	Upfield		All stations		

== Transport links ==
CDC Melbourne operates one route via Batman station, under contract to Transport Victoria:

- 530 : Campbellfield Plaza Shopping Centre – Coburg

Kinetic Melbourne operates one bus route via Batman station, under contract to Transport Victoria:

- 534 : Glenroy station – Coburg

Yarra Trams operates one route via Batman station:

- : North Coburg – Flinders Street station (via Elizabeth Street)
