= Campbellfield railway station =

Former railway station in Victoria, Australia

Coordinates: 37°41′19″S 144°57′22″E

Campbellfield

General information
- Line: Fawkner - Somerton
- Platforms: 1
- Tracks: 1

Other information
- Status: Demolished

History
- Opened: 8 October 1889; 136 years ago
- Closed: 13 July 1903; 5 May 1956
- Rebuilt: 5 March 1928

Services
Preceding station	VicRail	Following station
Fawkner Terminus	Fawkner-Somerton line	North Campbellfield towards Somerton
List of closed railway stations in Melbourne
Location

Campbellfield was a railway station on the Upfield railway line between the modern-day Upfield and Gowrie stations. The station was located in the suburb of Campbellfield, just to the north of the level crossing at Camp Road (which has since been grade-separated). The station opened in 1889, and originally closed in 1903. It reopened in 1928 and closed for the final time in 1956, after which the station was demolished.

== History ==
=== Original station (1889 – 1903) ===
Campbellfield station originally opened on 8th October 1889 when the line from Coburg was extended to Somerton (near the site of the modern-day Roxburgh Park station on the Craigieburn line). The station closed when the line was truncated back to Coburg on 13th July 1903.

=== "Beetle era" (1928 – 1956) ===
In 1928, the line from Fawkner to Somerton was reopened a new station was built at Campbellfield. This was done in conjunction with the return of a basic passenger service hauled by an AEC railmotor (nicknamed "the Beetle").

Because of the basic nature of the passenger service, the new station at Campbellfield was provided with a low level platform and a small "Mallee Shed" which provided the only shelter for passengers. In 1956, the line from Fawkner to Somerton was closed for the second time and Campbellfield station was demolished.

=== 1959 – present ===
In 1959, the line from Fawkner to Somerton was reopened in conjunction with the extension of electrified suburban services from Fawkner to Upfield. Despite this, Campbellfield station wasn't reinstated.

In 2006, it was suggested that the station might be rebuilt in the not-too-distant future, due to its proximity to the nearby Campbellfield Plaza shopping centre. But nothing concrete came of that. However, in April 2017, the Victorian Planning Authority released its draft plan for the area, including the construction of a station at Campbellfield.

Between October and December 2017, the level crossing at Camp Road level crossing was grade-separated as part of the Level Crossing Removal Project. This resulted in the line being lowered into a cutting to pass under the road, and provision was made in the cutting for both the installation of a second track and the possible reinstatement of a railway station in the future.
