= Macaulay railway station =

Railway station in Melbourne, Australia

Macaulay
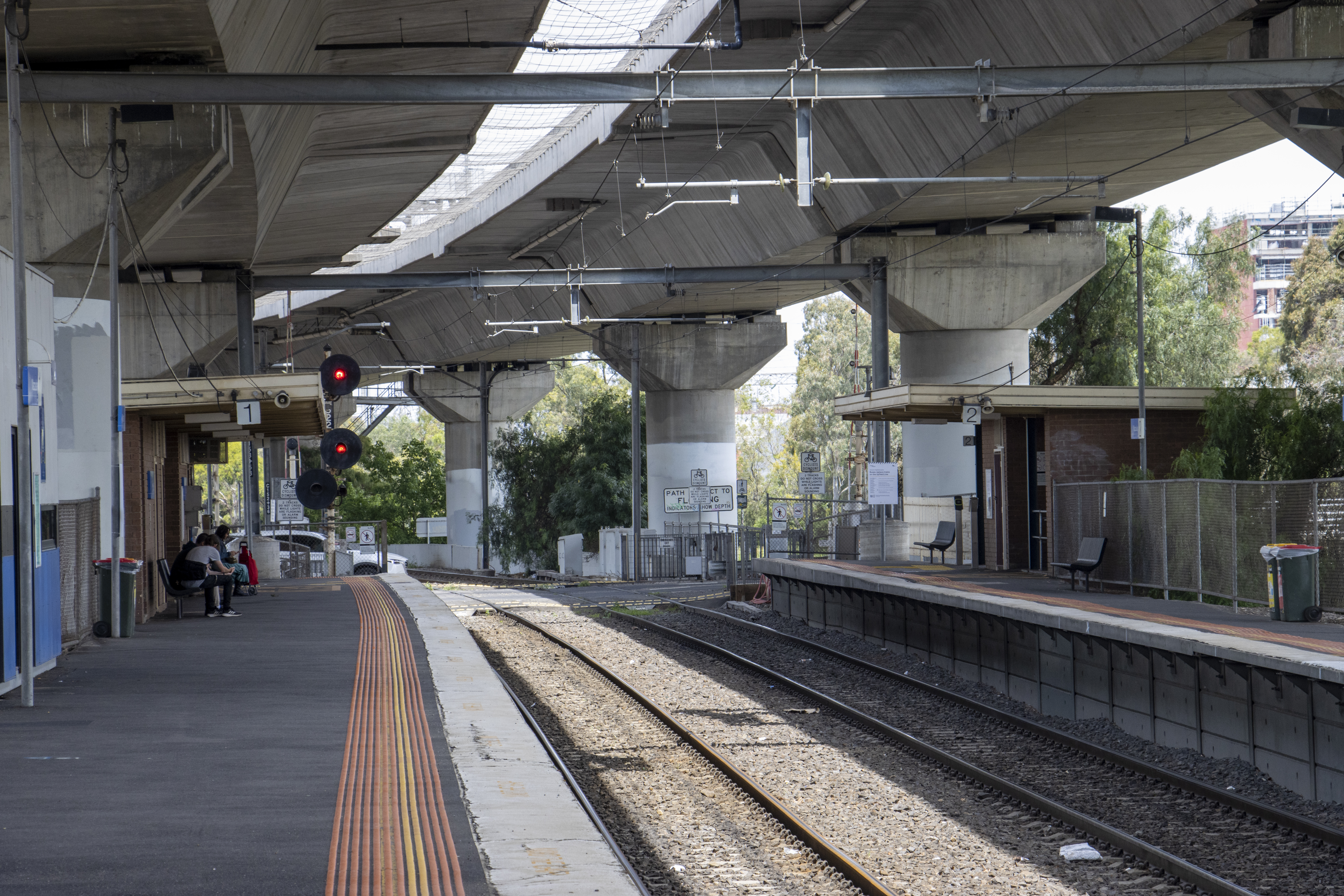
- Southbound view from Platform 1, November 2022

General information
- Location: Macaulay Road, North Melbourne, Victoria 3051; City of Melbourne; Australia
- Coordinates: 37°47′41″S 144°56′10″E
- System: PTV commuter rail station
- Owner: VicTrack
- Operator: Metro Trains
- Line: Upfield
- Distance: 3.25 kilometres from Southern Cross
- Platforms: 2 side
- Tracks: 2
- Connections: Bus

Construction
- Structure type: Ground
- Accessible: Yes—step free access

Other information
- Status: Operational, unstaffed
- Station code: MAC
- Fare zone: Myki zone 1
- Website: Public Transport Victoria

History
- Opened: 1 December 1887; 138 years ago
- Rebuilt: 1976
- Electrified: December 1920 (1500 V DC overhead)
- Former names: Macaulay Road (1887–1909)

Passengers
- 2005–2006: 111,546
- 2006–2007: 125,455 ▲12.46%
- 2007–2008: 136,978 ▲9.18%
- 2008–2009: 155,371 ▲13.42%
- 2009–2010: 167,037 ▲7.51%
- 2010–2011: 179,966 ▲7.74%
- 2011–2012: 172,612 ▼4.09%
- 2012–2013: Not measured
- 2013–2014: 195,887 ▲13.48%
- 2014–2015: 205,840 ▲5.08%
- 2015–2016: 246,887 ▲19.94%
- 2016–2017: 243,417 ▼1.4%
- 2017–2018: 248,158 ▲1.94%
- 2018–2019: 289,550 ▲16.68%
- 2019–2020: 249,450 ▼13.85%
- 2020–2021: 101,750 ▼59.2%
- 2021–2022: 126,350 ▲24.17%

Services
Preceding station	Metro Trains	Following station
North Melbourne towards Flinders Street	Upfield line	Flemington Bridge towards Upfield
Track layout
Location

Macaulay station is a railway station operated by Metro Trains Melbourne on the Upfield line, part of the Melbourne rail network. It serves the inner-northern suburb of North Melbourne, in Melbourne, Victoria, Australia. Macaulay station is a ground-level unstaffed station, featuring two side platforms. It opened on 1 December 1887, with the current station buildings provided in 1976.

Initially opened as Macaulay Road, the station was given its current name of Macaulay on 1 May 1909.

The station is located beside the Moonee Ponds Creek to its west, and surrounded mainly by factories and warehouses. Kensington, on the Craigieburn line, is only 400 m (1,300 ft) west of Macaulay, and is significantly closer to the residential area and handles a larger number of commuters.

The station is also located at ground level, beneath the CityLink tollway, which is supported atop concrete columns that are located outside the platform fencing.

== History ==
Macaulay station opened on 1 December 1887, three years after the railway line from North Melbourne was extended to Coburg. The station is named after Macaulay Road, itself named after Thomas Babington Macaulay, a British politician and historian.

To the east of the station were a number of goods sidings, which opened after 1919, and have since been removed.

In May 1972, the suburban train stabling yard near the station, located towards North Melbourne, opened, as part of the City Loop project. Also in that year, automatic signalling was provided between Macaulay and Royal Park, replacing Double Line Block signalling, and boom barriers replacing interlocked gates at the Macaulay Road level crossing, located at the up end of the station, as well as the abolishment of the signal box. On 1 July 1975, parcel facilities at the station were abolished. In 1976, the current station buildings were provided.

On 17 November 1993, a light repair facility officially opened in the stabling yard, as part of the closure of the Jolimont Workshops. In 1997, a crossover at the down end of the station was abolished.

== Platforms and services ==
Macaulay has two side platforms. It is serviced by Metro Trains' Upfield line services.

Macaulay platform arrangement
Platform	Line	Destination	Via	Service Type	Notes	Source
1	Upfield line	Flinders Street	City Loop	All stations	See City Loop for operating patterns	
2	Upfield line	Upfield		All stations		

== Transport links ==
Transit Systems Victoria operates one route via Macaulay station, under contract to Public Transport Victoria:

- 402 : Footscray station – East Melbourne
