= Merlynston railway station =

Railway station in Melbourne, Australia

Merlynston
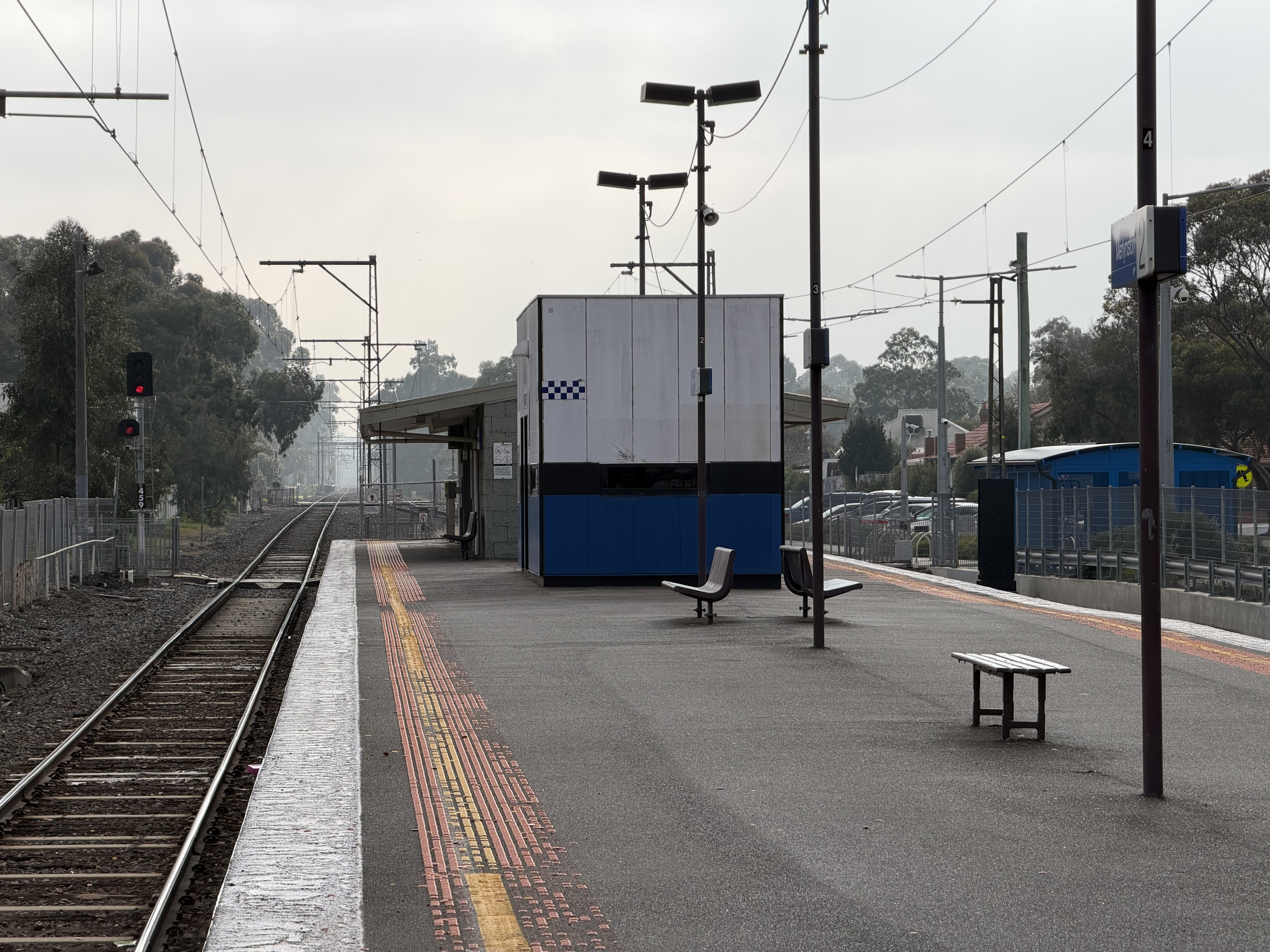
- Northbound view from Platform 2, June 2026

General information
- Location: Bain Avenue, Coburg North, Victoria 3058; City of Merri-bek; Australia
- Coordinates: 37°43′15″S 144°57′41″E
- System: PTV commuter rail station
- Owner: VicTrack
- Operator: Metro Trains
- Line: Upfield
- Distance: 12.49 kilometres from Southern Cross
- Platforms: 2 (1 island)
- Tracks: 2
- Connections: Bus

Construction
- Structure type: Ground
- Parking: 218
- Cycle facilities: Yes
- Accessible: Yes—step-free access

Other information
- Status: Operational, unstaffed
- Station code: MYN
- Fare zone: Myki zone 1/2
- Website: Public Transport Victoria

History
- Opened: 8 October 1889; 137 years ago
- Closed: 13 July 1903
- Rebuilt: 1 October 1914; 19 July 1959
- Electrified: December 1920 (1500 V DC overhead)
- Former names: North Coburg (1889–1922)

Passengers
- 2005–2006: 257,385
- 2006–2007: 283,721 ▲10.23%
- 2007–2008: 321,808 ▲13.42%
- 2008–2009: 391,833 ▲21.76%
- 2009–2010: 420,566 ▲7.33%
- 2010–2011: 420,630 ▲0.01%
- 2011–2012: 387,519 ▼7.87%
- 2012–2013: Not measured
- 2013–2014: 363,901 ▼6.1%
- 2014–2015: 351,291 ▼3.46%
- 2015–2016: 361,922 ▼0.54%
- 2016–2017: 371,447 ▲2.63%
- 2017–2018: 334,983 ▼9.82%
- 2018–2019: 392,850 ▲17.27%
- 2019–2020: 296,300 ▼24.6%
- 2020–2021: 126,950 ▼57.2%
- 2021–2022: 154,400 ▲21.62%

Services
Preceding station	Metro Trains	Following station
Batman towards Flinders Street	Upfield line	Fawkner towards Upfield
Track layout
Location

Merlynston station is a railway station operated by Metro Trains Melbourne on the Upfield line, part of the Melbourne rail network. It serves the northern suburb of Coburg North in Melbourne, Victoria, Australia. Merlynston station is a ground-level unstaffed station, featuring an island platform. It opened on 8 October 1889, with the current station provided in 1959. It initially closed on 13 July 1903, then reopened on 1 October 1914.

Initially opened as North Coburg, the station was given its current name of Merlynston on 6 February 1922.

== History ==
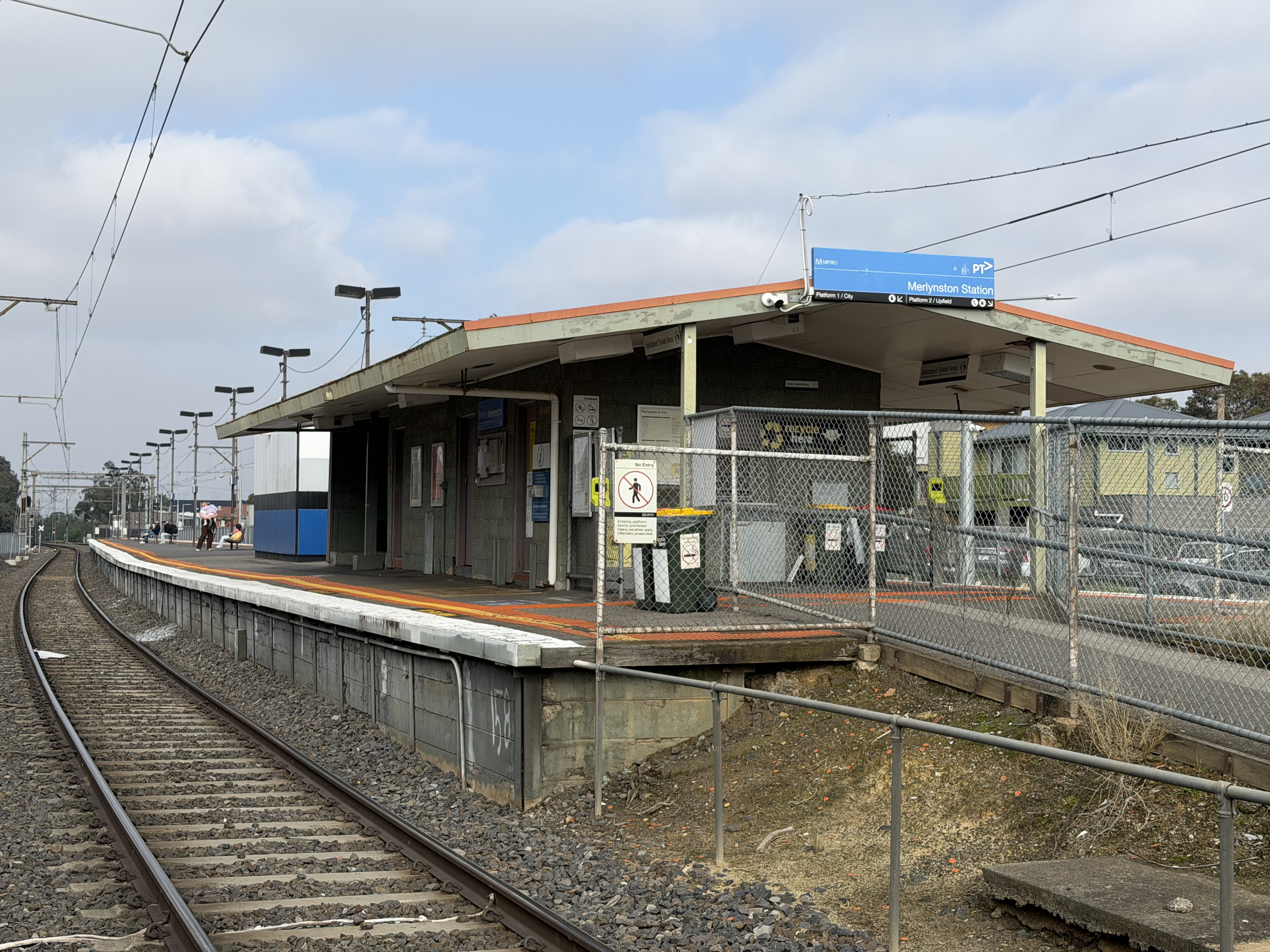
Merlynston Station's main northern end station building from Platform 1 side, viewed from the station's northern end pedestrian railway crossing, June 2026

Merlynston station opened as North Coburg when the railway line was extended from Coburg to Somerton. The station initially closed in 1903 when the line was truncated back to Coburg, but the line reopened as far as Fawkner in 1906 for traffic to the newly opened Fawkner Cemetery.

The station reopened when passenger services were re-extended from Coburg to Fawkner in 1914, and in 1922 the station was renamed to Merlynston. The station and locality were named by Donald Bain who, in 1919, purchased 31 hectares of land to be subdivided into a housing estate. Bain named the estate after his daughter, Merlyn.

In 1948, flashing light signals were provided at the Boundary Road level crossing, in the down direction from the station. In 1959, the current island platform was provided when the line was duplicated between Coburg and Fawkner.

In 1984, boom barriers were provided at the Boundary Road level crossing.

In November 1998, the level crossing at Shorts Road, south of the station, was closed, and a dead-end street was created on either side of the railway line. Until the track was duplicated to Gowrie in that year, the line north of the station had only a single track, apart from the island platform at Gowrie, which had two platforms. However, one of those was a dock platform, meaning trains couldn't pass each other at Gowrie, and had to do so at Merlynston.

On 9 April 2002, Comeng motor carriage 533M was destroyed by a fire at the station. The fire also damaged part of the station building.

== Platforms and services ==
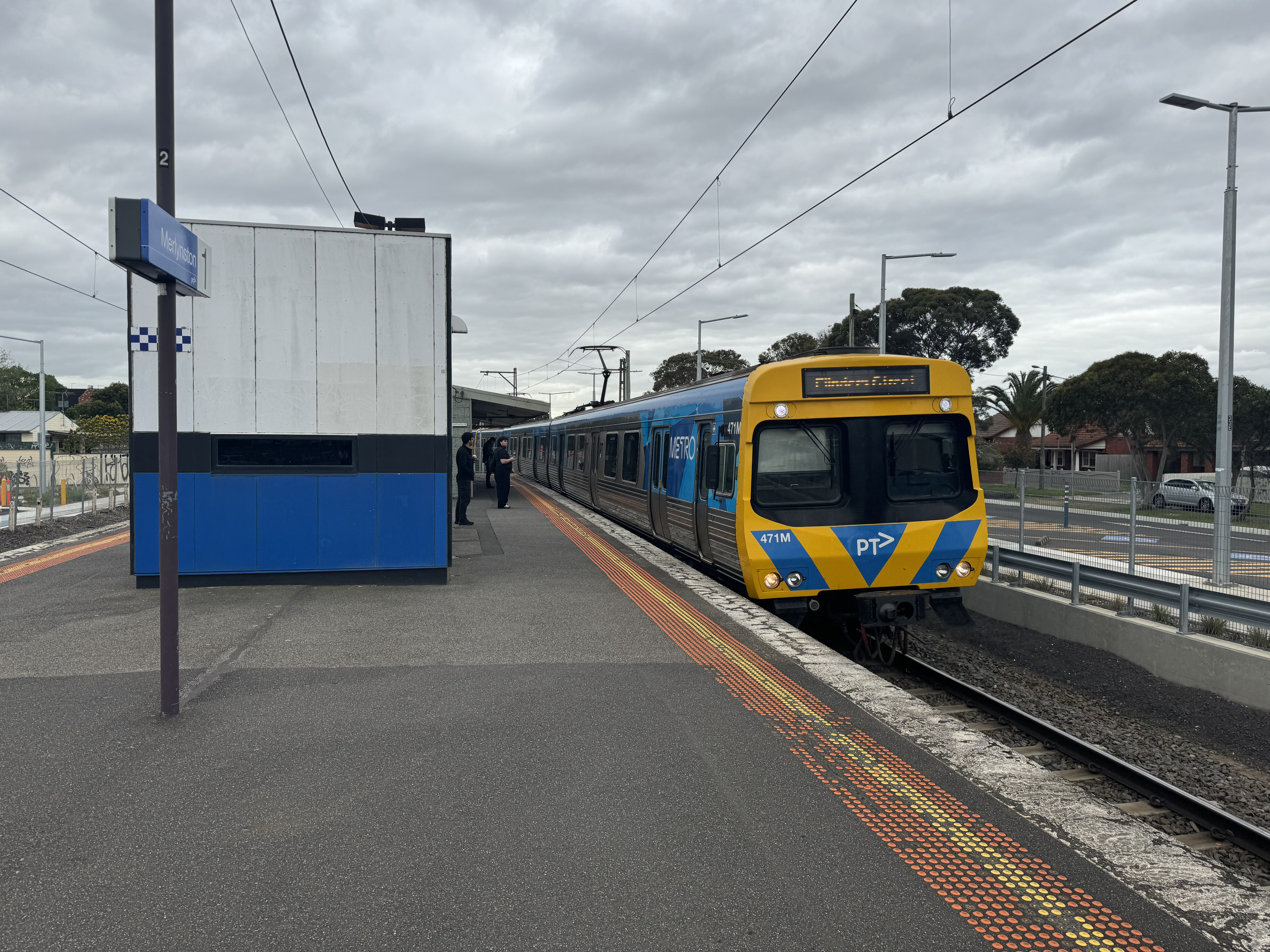
A Comeng train on a Flinders Street-bound service arrives at Platform 1, October 2024

Merlynston has one island platform with two faces. It is served by Metro Trains' Upfield line trains.

Merlynston platform arrangement
Platform	Line	Destination	Via	Service Type	Notes	Source
1	Upfield line	Flinders Street	City Loop	All stations	See City Loop for operating patterns	
2	Upfield line	Upfield		All stations		

== Transport links ==
CDC Melbourne operates two routes via Merlynston station, under contract to Transport Victoria:

- 530 : Campbellfield Plaza Shopping Centre – Coburg
- 531 : Upfield station – North Coburg

Kinetic Melbourne operates one bus route via Merlynston station, under contract to Transport Victoria:

- 534 : Glenroy station – Coburg

== Gallery ==
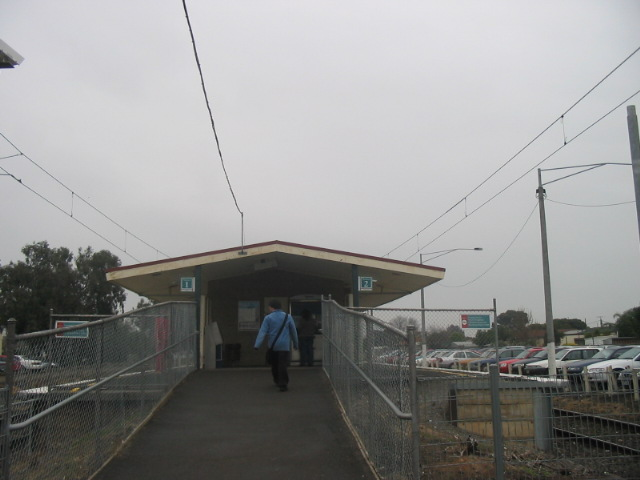
Station building and entrance to platforms, June 2005

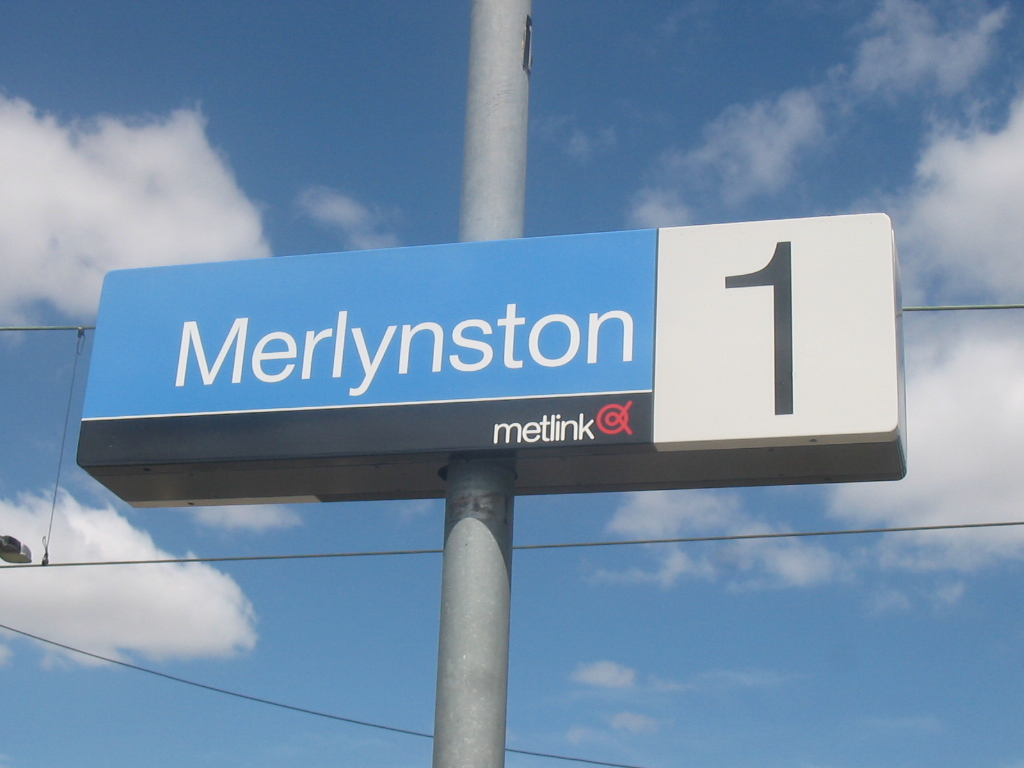
Platform 1 station signage, December 2005

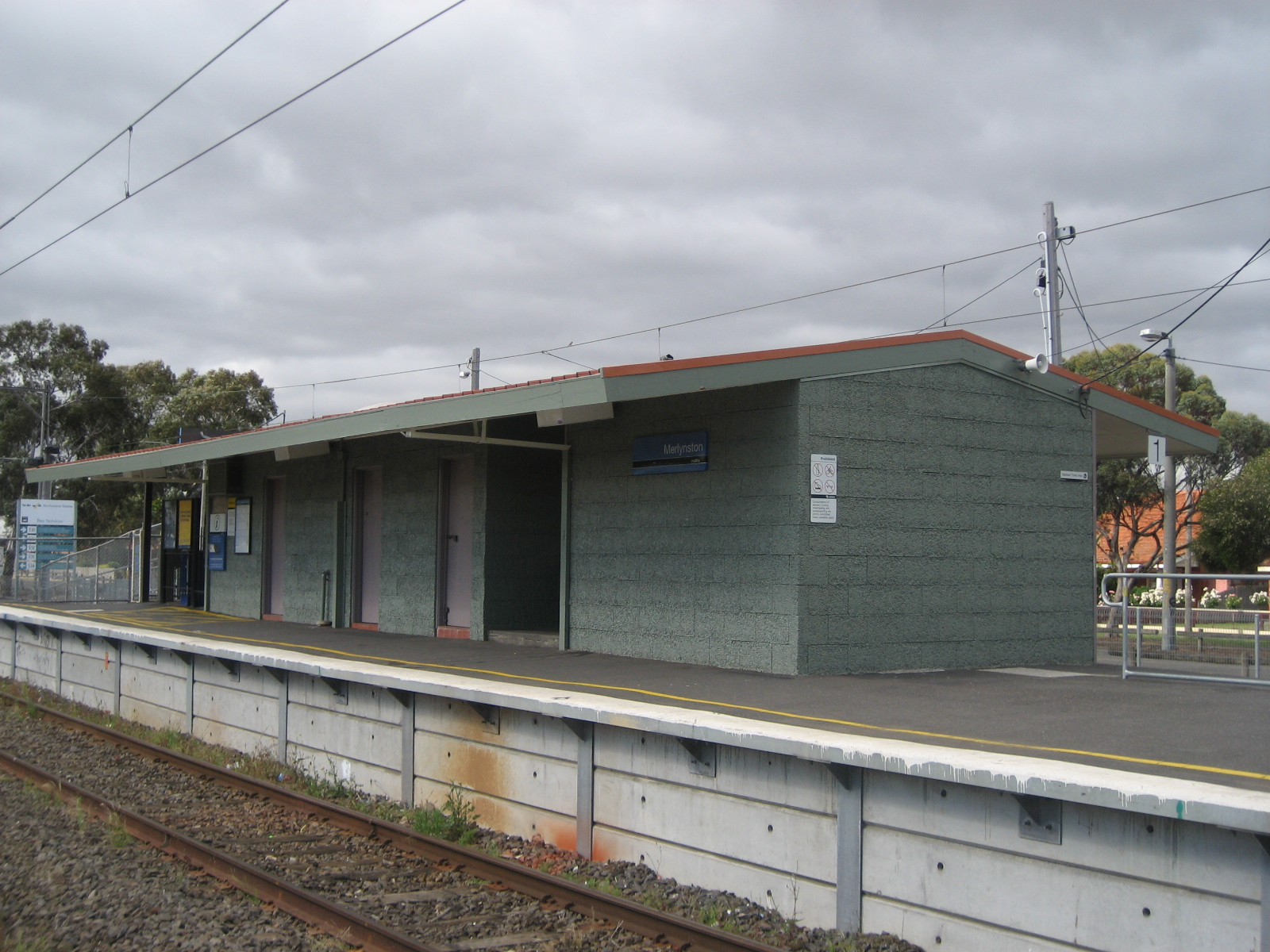
North-east bound view of Platform 2 and the station building, November 2006

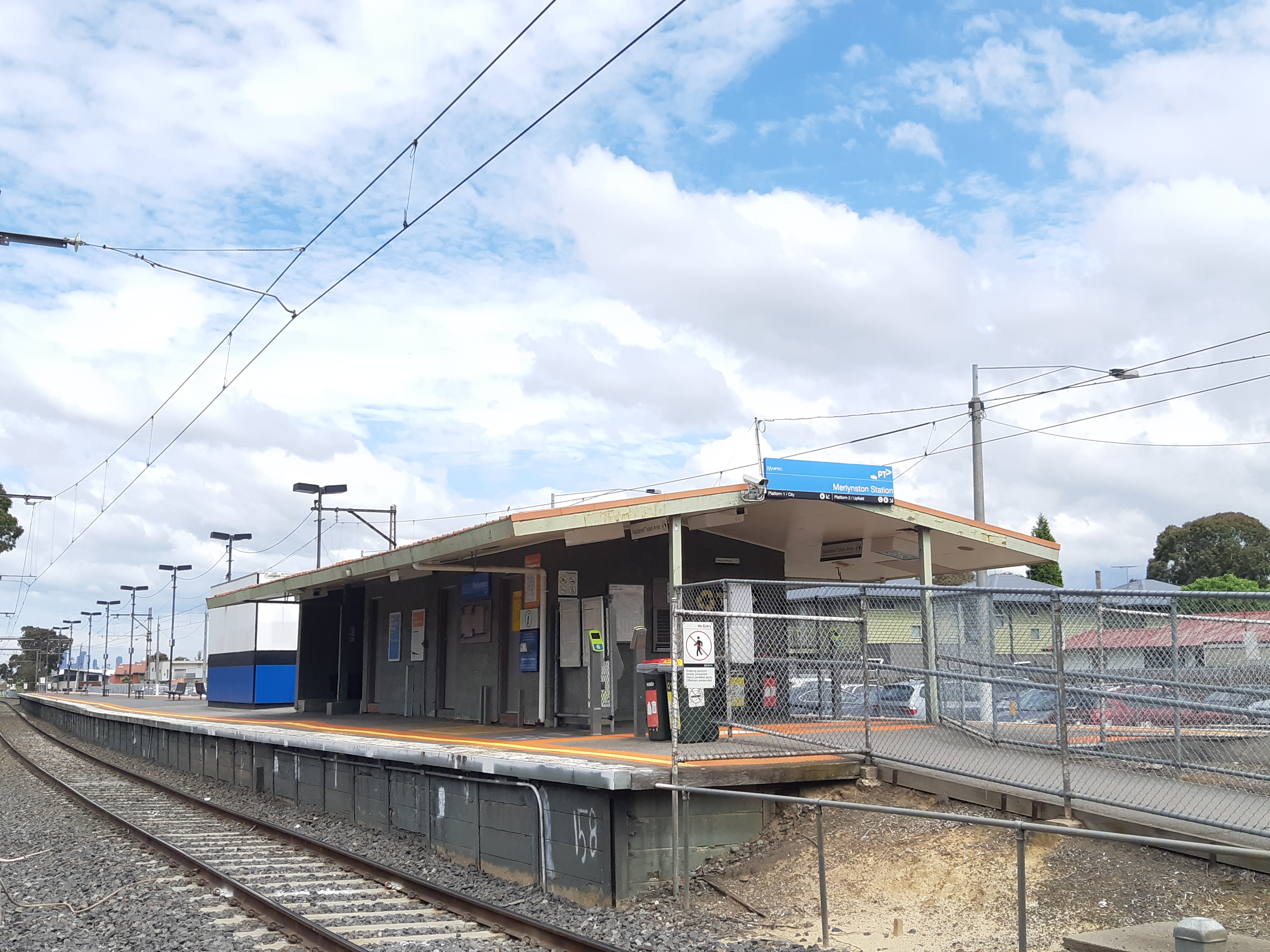
Southbound view of Platform 1 and the station building, October 2019

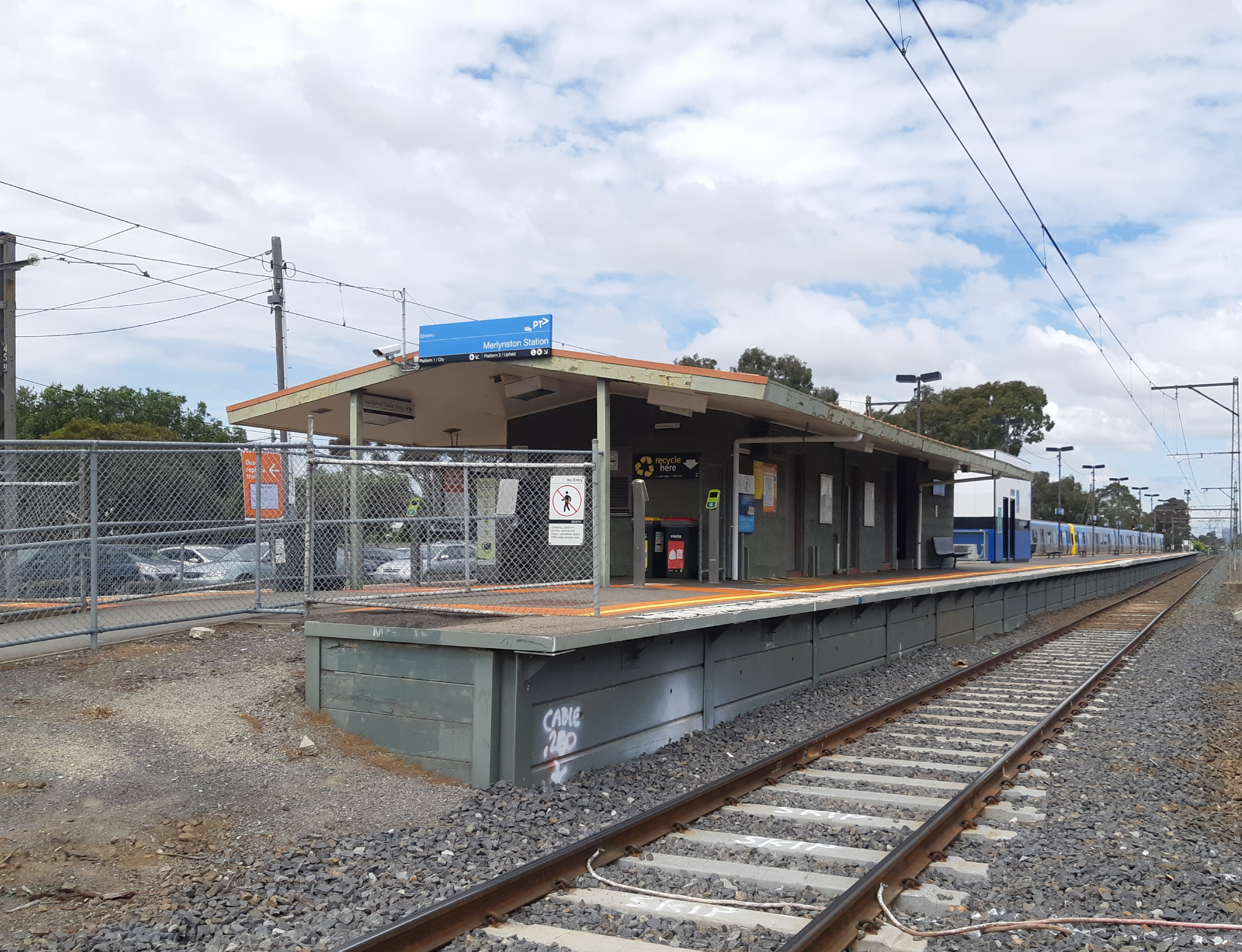
Southbound view of Platform 2 and the station building, October 2019

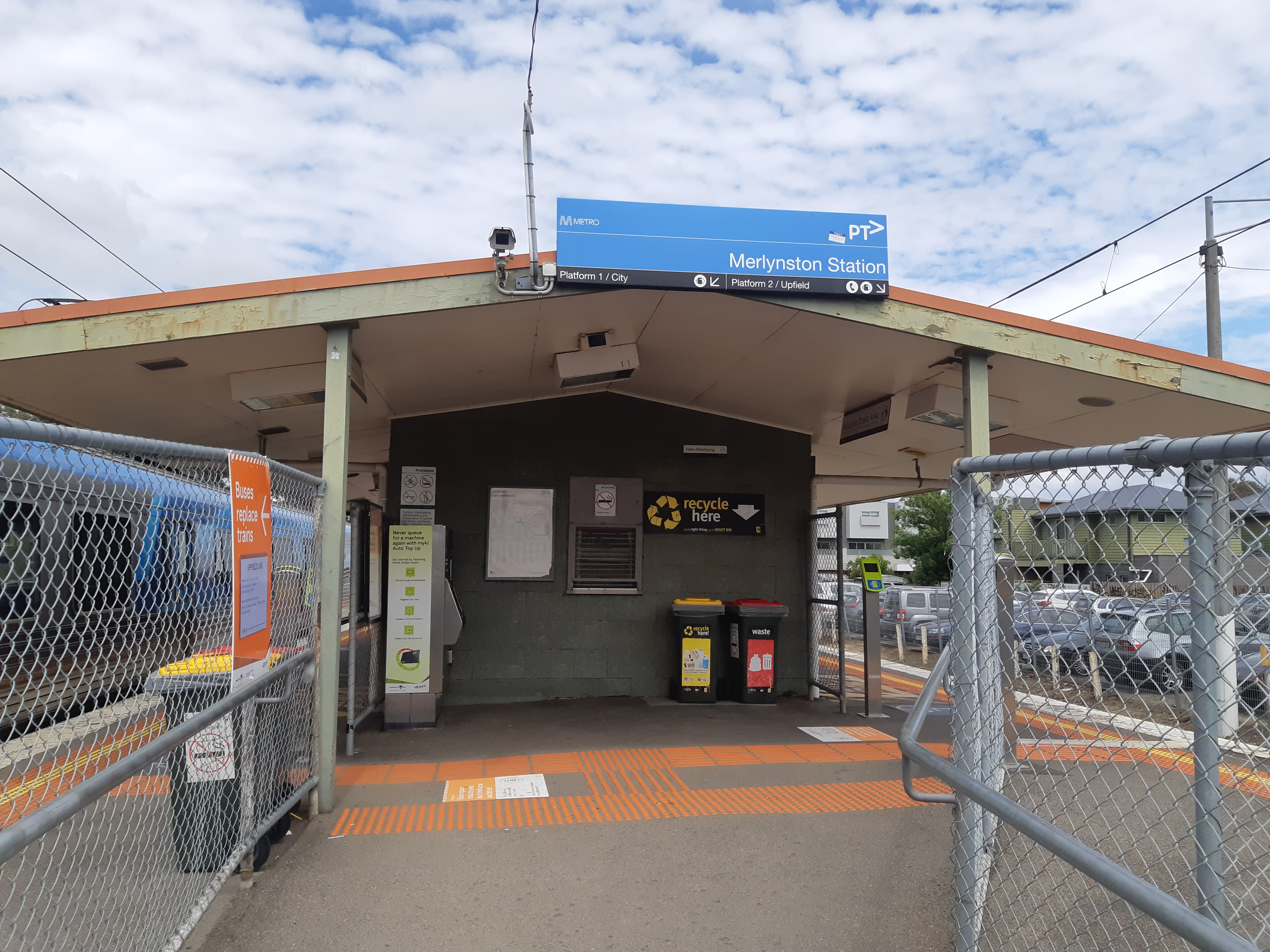
Station building and entrance to the platforms, October 2019

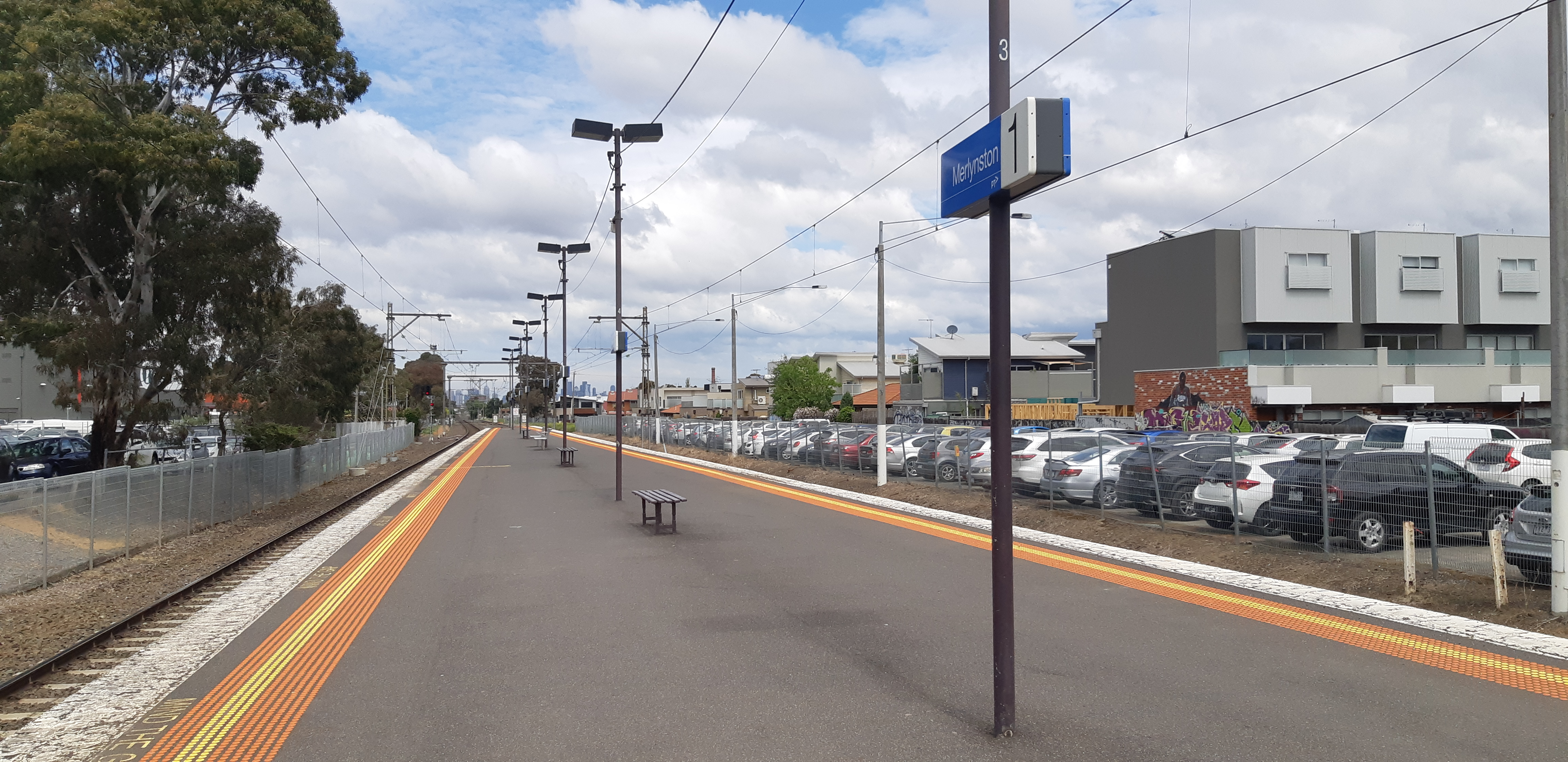
Southbound view from Platform 1, October 2019

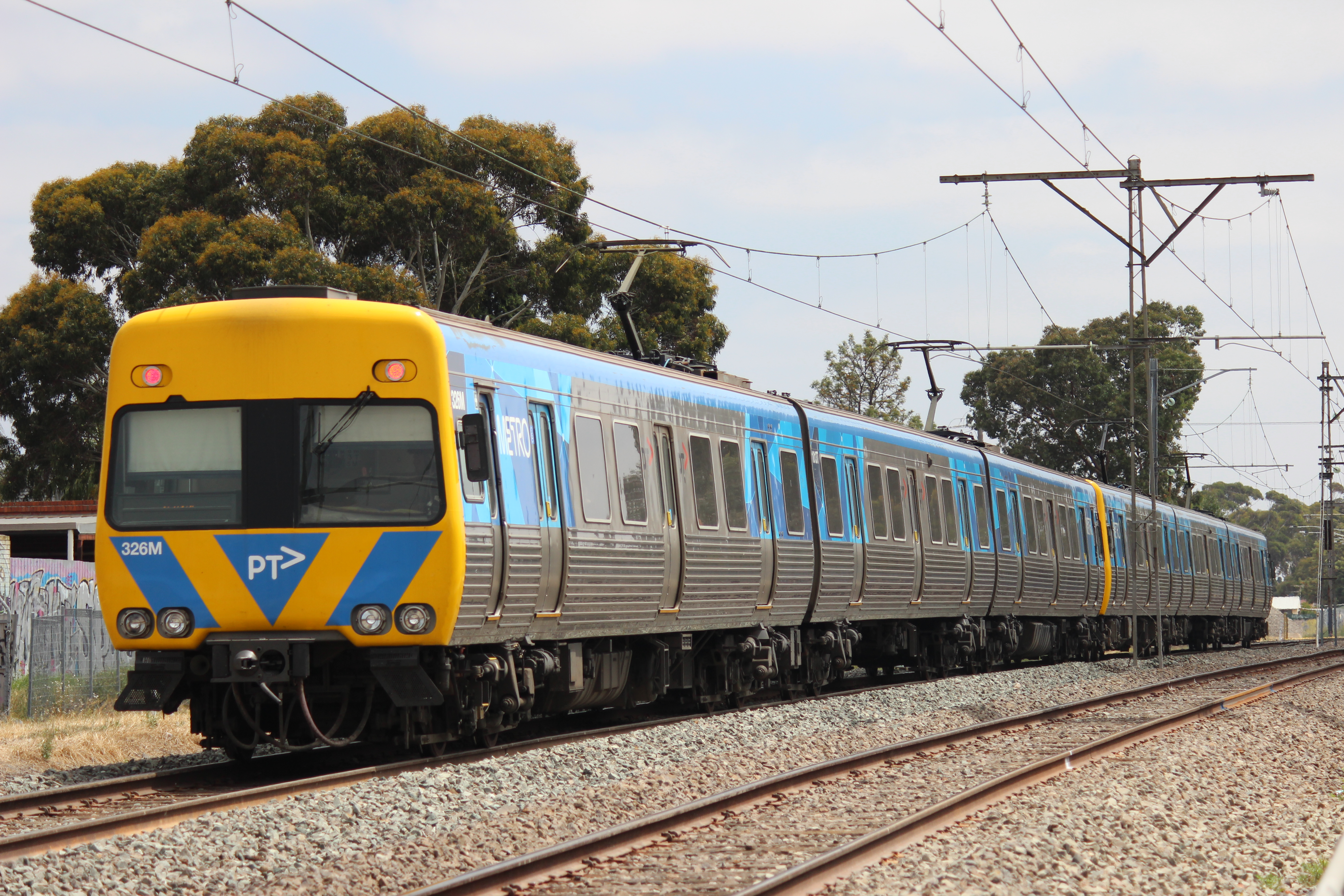
A Comeng train on a Flinders Street-bound service approaching near Merlynston station in Coburg North, December 2019

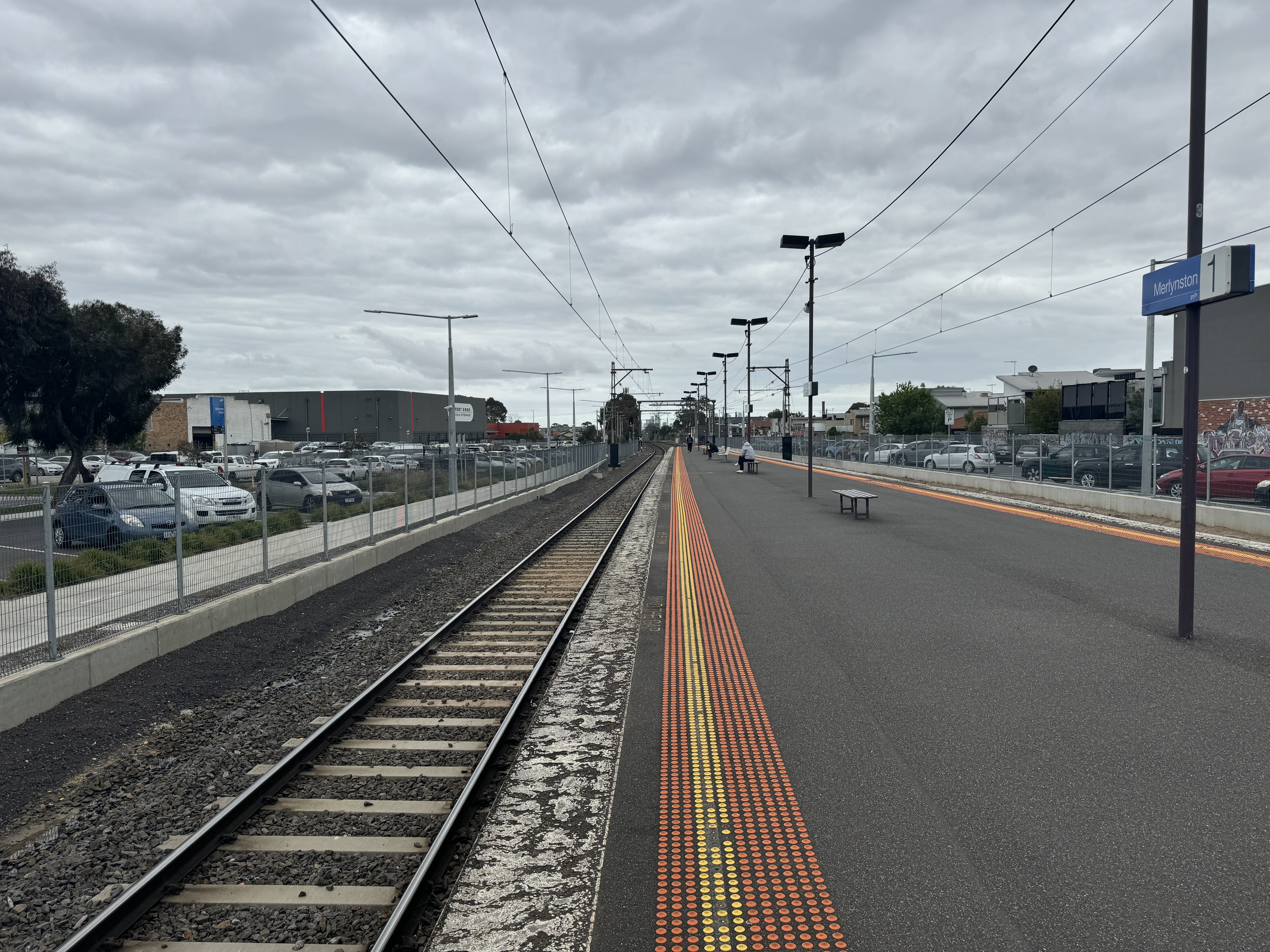
Southbound view from Platform 1, October 2024

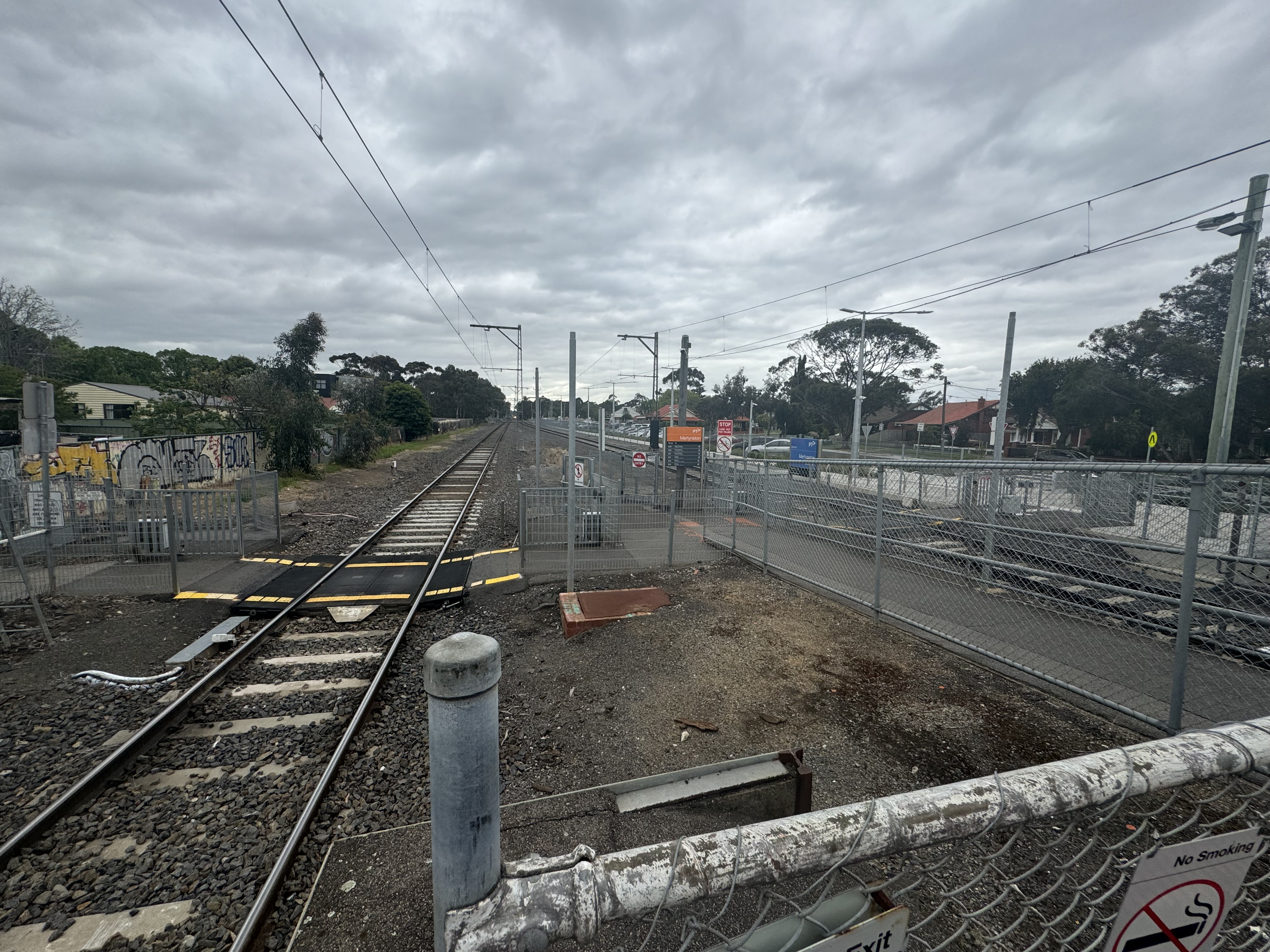
The pedestrian crossing gates, adjacent to the station on the northern side, October 2024
