= Upfield line =

Passenger rail service in Melbourne, Australia

Upfield

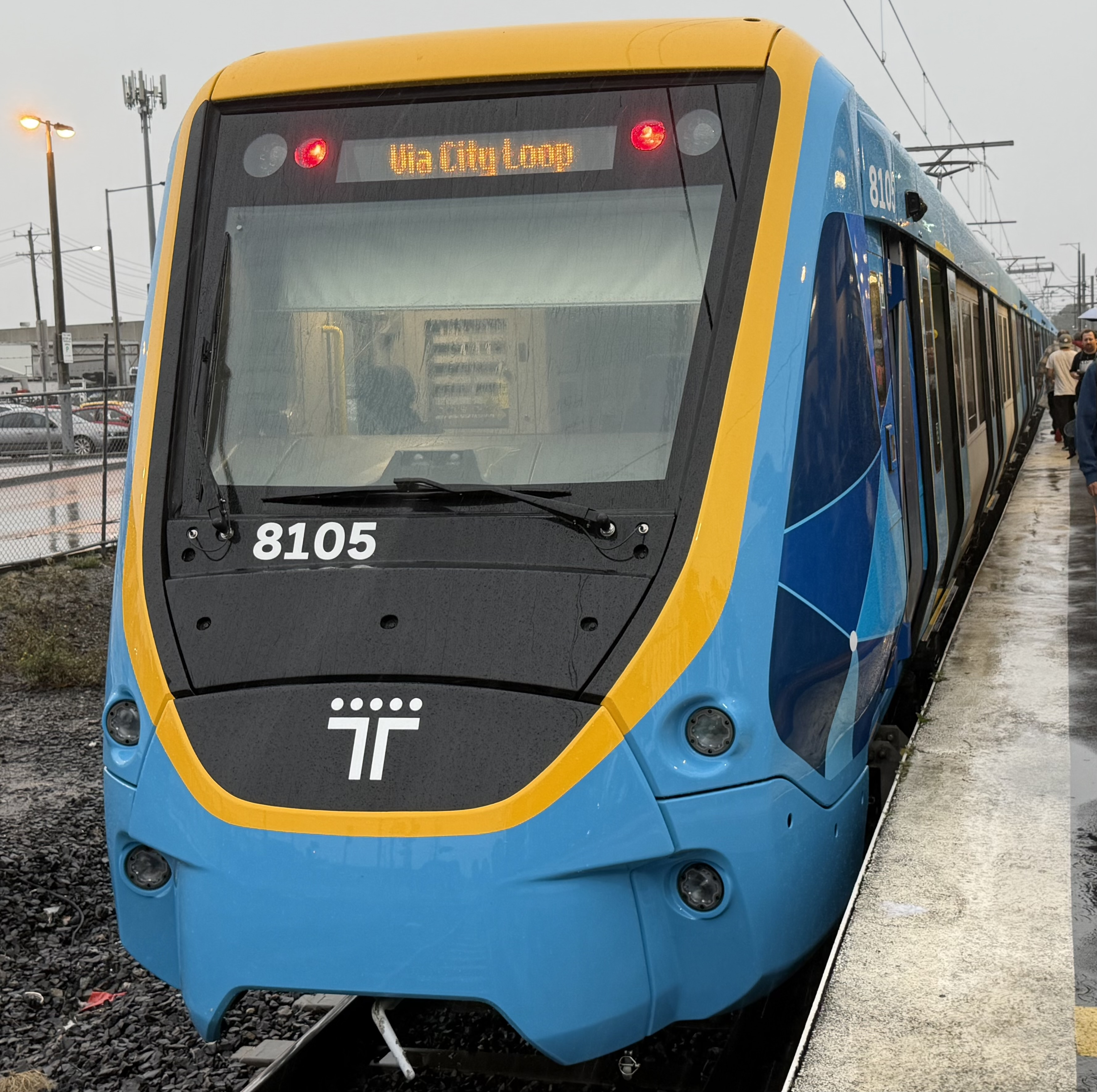
- An X'Trapolis 2.0 train at Upfield station, May 2026

Overview
- Service type: Commuter rail
- System: Melbourne railway network
- Status: Operational
- Locale: Melbourne, Victoria, Australia
- Predecessor: Coburg (1884–1889); Somerton (1889–1903); Coburg (1903–1914); Fawkner † (1906–1914); Fawkner (1914–1920); Fawkner ^ (1920–1959); Somerton § (1928–1956)^ are electric services † cemetery traffic only § railmotor service
- First service: 9 September 1884; 142 years ago
- Current operator: Metro Trains
- Former operators: Victorian Railways (VR) (1884–1974); VR as VicRail (1974–1983); MTA (The Met) (1983–1989); PTC (The Met) (1989–1998); Bayside Trains (1998–1999); M>Train (1999–2004); Connex Melbourne (2004–2009)

Route
- Termini: Flinders Street; Upfield
- Stops: 19 (including City Loop stations)
- Distance travelled: 20.1 km (12.5 mi)
- Average journey time: 36 minutes (not via City Loop)
- Service frequency: 15–20 minutes weekdays peak; 20 minutes weekdays off-peak; 20 minutes weekend daytime; 30 minutes nights; 60 minutes early weekend mornings
- Line used: Upfield

Technical
- Rolling stock: Comeng, Siemens, X'Trapolis 2.0
- Track gauge: 1,600 mm (5 ft 3 in)
- Electrification: 1500 V DC overhead
- Track owner: VicTrack

The Upfield line is a commuter railway line in the city of Melbourne, Victoria, Australia. Operated by Metro Trains Melbourne, it is the city's fifth-shortest metropolitan railway line at 20.1 kilometres (12.5 mi). The line runs from Flinders Street station in central Melbourne to Upfield station in the north, serving 19 stations via North Melbourne, Brunswick, Coburg, and Fawkner.

The line operates for approximately 19 hours a day (from approximately 05:00 to around midnight) with a 24-hour service on Friday and Saturday nights. During peak hours, headways of up to 15 minutes are operated, with services every 20–30 minutes during off-peak hours. Trains run in two three-car formations of either Comeng or Siemens Nexas sets or one six-car formation of X'Trapolis 2.0 sets.

Services on the line began in 1884 when it opened from North Melbourne to Coburg. In October 1889, it was extended to Somerton. The line beyond Coburg to Fawkner and Somerton was closed and reopened a number of times during the early-to-mid-20th century and the continued existence of the line was in serious doubt in the late 1980s and early 1990s, with proposals for it either to be converted to a light rail or fully closed. However a major infastructure upgrade in the late 1990s saw the plans for closure abandoned.

With the future of the rail line secured, and patronage growth in the 2000s, infrastructure upgrades were carried out on the line. They included replacing sleepers, upgrading signalling technology, removing level crossings, introducing new rolling stock, and improving station accessibility. The 2018 Victorian Rail Plan identified the need to reopen the line between Upfield and Somerton/Roxburgh Park, and run regional and metropolitan rail services via that route in the near future. However, there has been virtually no movement on that front since then.

== History ==
=== 19th century ===
Coburg railway line (former)
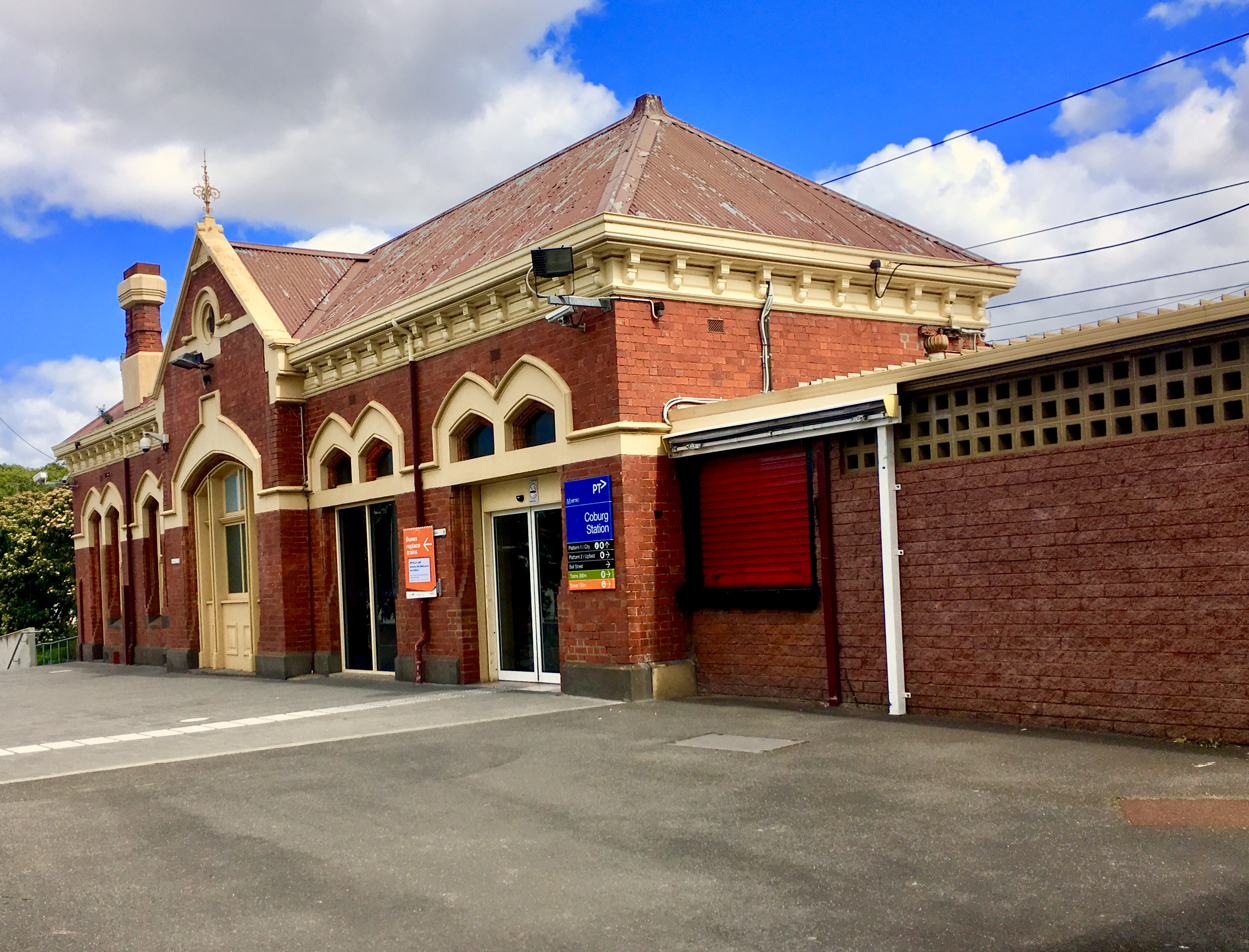
- The old Coburg railway station, 2019

History
- Built by: Robert Thornton and Company

Victorian Heritage Register
- Official name: Former Coburg Railway Line
- Type: Registered place
- Criteria: A, B, D
- Designated: 23 October 1997
- Reference no.: H0952
- Heritage overlay no.: HO180
- Category: Transport - Rail

The first part of the Coburg railway line from North Melbourne to Coburg was opened by the Governor of Victoria Henry Loch on 9 September 1884, and cost £53,000. Duplication of the line followed, starting with North Melbourne to Royal Park in September 1888, then Royal Park to South Brunswick (now Jewell) in May 1889, Brunswick to Coburg in December 1891, and South Brunswick to Brunswick in August 1892. In October 1889, the line was extended from Coburg to connect to the North East line at Somerton.

==== Heritage listing ====
The former Coburg railway line was added to the Victorian Heritage Register on 23 October 1997 in recognition of its historical significance. The heritage curtail is extensive that includes seven distinct precincts that contain nineteenth century station buildings and platforms at Coburg, Moreland, Jewell, and Brunswick, substations, signal boxes, gatekeepers cabins, remnant interlocking and safe-working equipment, levers and rodding, signals, gates and industrial sidings.

=== 20th century ===
==== Coburg - Somerton closure and reopening to Fawkner (1900–1928) ====
The line from Coburg to Somerton closed in July 1903, but was reopened as far as Fawkner three years later in December 1906. The reopening was for funeral trains only, in conjunction with the creation of the adjacent Fawkner Cemetery. Normal passenger services were re-extended to Fawkner in 1914, and the line was electrified in December 1920.

==== Fawkner - Somerton railmotor ("The Beetle") (1928 - 1956) ====
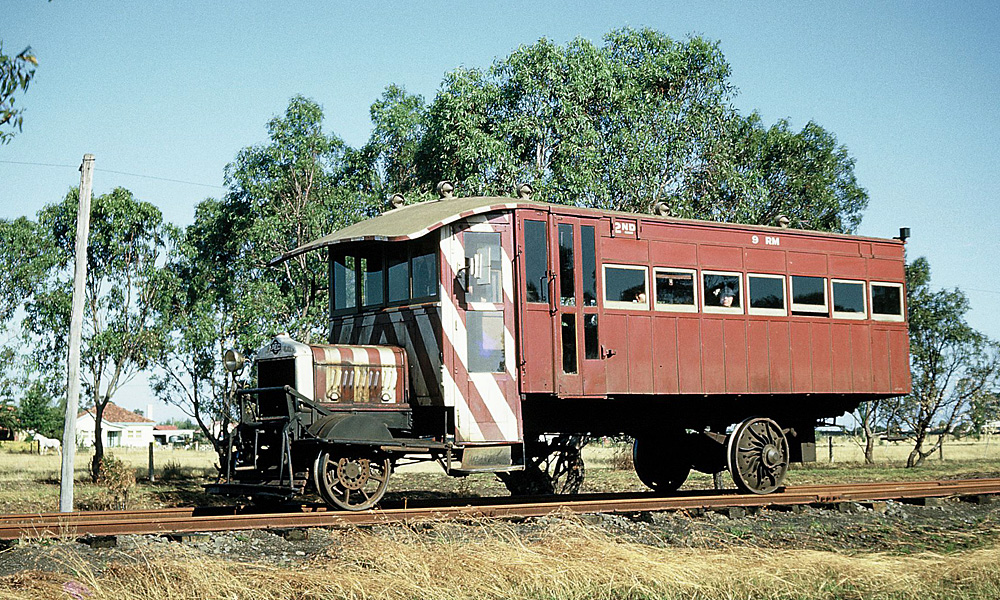
AEC railmotor near Fawkner, 1953

In March 1928, despite strong resistance from the Railways Commissioners, the state government ordered the reopening of the section from Fawkner to Somerton for passengers. An extremely basic passenger service was provided by an AEC railmotor, which connected with electric trains at Fawkner and was nicknamed "the Beetle".

Stations were reinstated at Campbellfield and North Campbellfield, equipped with low-level platforms and basic waiting sheds. In May 1956, the line from Fawkner to Somerton was closed for the second time.

==== Reopening to Somerton and electrification to Upfield (1959–1970) ====
Three years after the railmotor service to Somerton was withdrawn in 1959, the line from Fawkner to Somerton reopened again for goods trains and the electrification and suburban service was extended from Fawkner to Upfield to cater for workers at the new Ford automotive factory. In that same year, the line from Coburg to Fawkner was also duplicated.

In September 1958, Sunday evening services after 6pm withdrawn, being replaced by adjacent tram routes, particularly the North Coburg line (now Route 19). At the outer end of the railway line, a bus service was provided, connecting with trams in North Coburg. In June 1961, that arrangement was extended to apply for the whole of Sunday and, in October 1961, it was further extended to include services after 7:30pm between Mondays and Saturdays.

In January 1963, the line from Somerton to the Ford factory was re-laid as dual gauge gauntlet track, to provide a standard gauge connection with the new North East standard gauge line at Somerton. In October 1968, electric staff safeworking was introduced on the Upfield to Somerton section. However, the Upfield to Somerton section, which included four industrial sidings, has not been used for some time and is out of commission.

==== Proposed light rail conversion, infrastructure upgrades, CityLink and the demise of the Somerton connection (1970–1998) ====
Automatic signalling advanced a little further along the line in August 1971, with Royal Park to Jewell being converted. In April 1972, the Macaulay to Royal Park section was similarly converted. By May 1988, serious consideration was given to proposals to convert the line to light rail, following the conversion of the St Kilda and Port Melbourne lines in 1987. A report submitted to the Cain government determined that the route suffered from low passenger numbers, redundancy with the Route 19 tram, outdated signalling systems, manned boom gates well past their prime, and that substantial investments would be required to modernise the line to meet modern standards. After discussions with local councils, unions, the public, and the Metropolitan Transit Authority, two options were floated. These options included:

- The conversion of the entire line, or part of the line to light rail
- The closure of large amounts of the line and instead running the light rail via Sydney Road

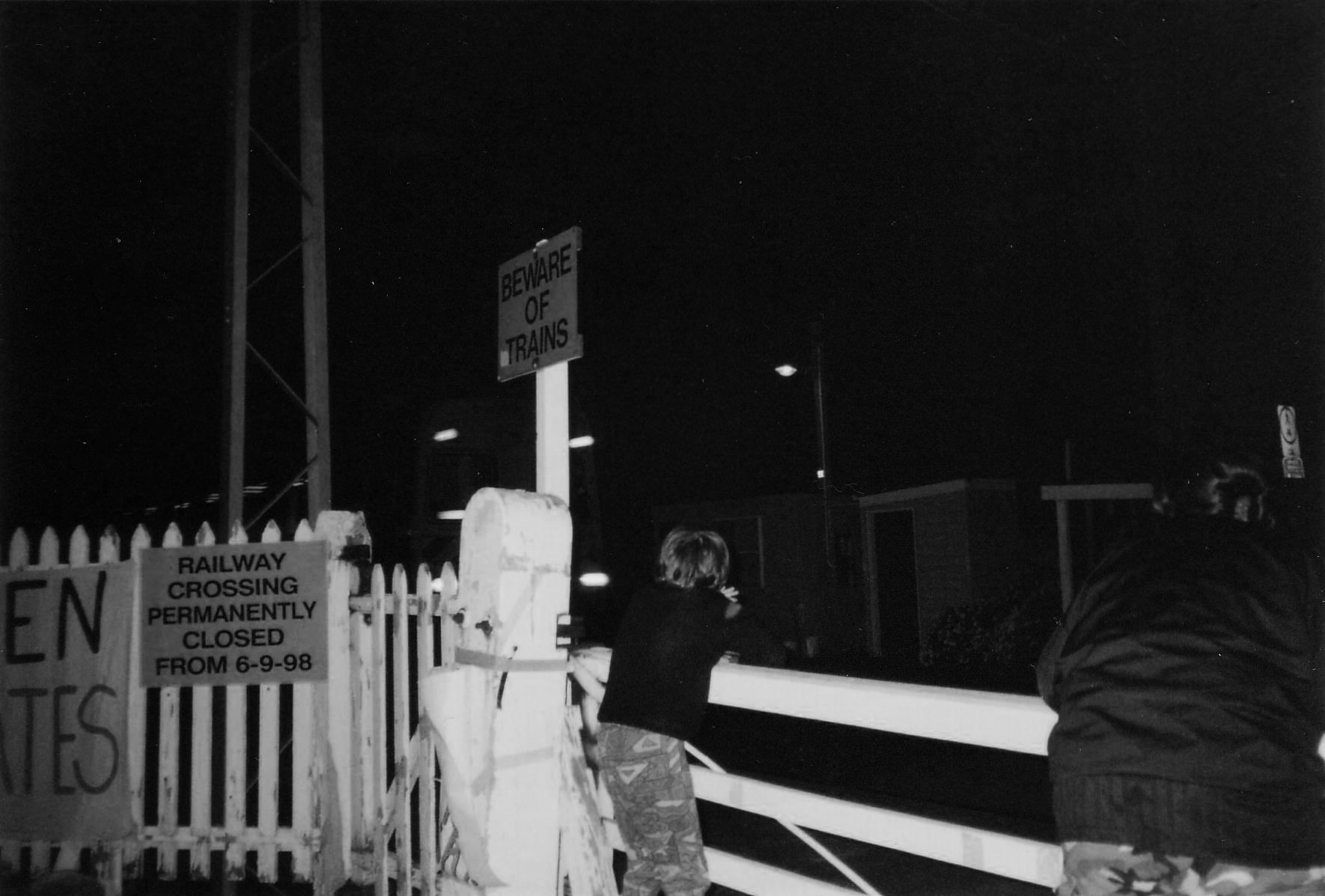
Tinning Street crossing was permanently closed in 1998, with ~20 people gathered at the site during the final train service, including local members of state and federal parliament Carlo Carli and Kelvin Thomson.

These proposals were put to rest in April 1995, when it was announced that $23 million would be spent upgrading the line. The work included the provision of power signalling for the whole line, duplication of the line from Fawkner to Gowrie and the installation of boomgates at all level crossings (except for a few that were closed instead). At the time, many of the numerous level crossings on the line were still controlled by gatekeepers, who opened and closed the gates manually for every train. This upgrade was completed in 1998.

In 1997, the Upfield line was temporarily closed between Flemington Bridge and North Melbourne to allow for the construction of CityLink, which was built above part the existing Upfield line corridor. During this time, passengers were transported by bus from Flemington Bridge to the nearby Newmarket station, from where passengers would complete the journey into the city using the Broadmeadows line.

During the closure, trains were transferred to and from the Upfield line using the connection at Somerton. This was the last known use of the line beyond Upfield, as the section from Upfield to the Ford Sidings was booked out of use in 1997.

=== 21st century ===
During the 2006 Commonwealth Games, Royal Park station played a critical role in the running of the games, as it was centrally located to the athletes village and the State Netball and Hockey Centre. The line and station became heavily utilised during the games, with increased security and staff presence at the station.

==== Level crossings ====
While other lines such as the Collingwood to Clifton Hill Line incorporated bridges which spanned the streets below, the former Coburg line included an unusual amount of level crossings, particularly at its southern end between Park Street and Hope Street. The crossings were each equipped with four wooden gates and associated signals. The gates were mostly hand operated by gatekeepers who occupied the adjacent gatekeepers cabins and signal boxes. The signals were operated using the various lever systems housed within these buildings. Gates, and gatekeepers cabins or signal boxes survive at some crossings, although their positions have been modified to allow for the installation of boom gates. Most of the signals also survive, although they have been either rotated or relocated for safety reasons. Boom gates replaced some of the manually operated timber level crossing gates and signal boxes became electronically operated and from c. 1997, some of the level crossings were closed; or were subsequently elevated.

== Future ==
=== Reopening to Somerton & Wallan extension ===
Highlighted in the 2018 Victorian Rail Plan, a proposal exists to reopen the line from Upfield to Somerton, along with electrification and extension of suburban services to Wallan. The 2018 Victorian Rail Plan has proposed the following projects take place as part of the Wallan extension:

Stage	Project	Notes
Stage 2 (Metro Tunnel Day One)	Rerouting of Seymour and Shepparton services via the Upfield line instead of the Craigieburn line	This project was meant to be completed by the opening of the Metro Tunnel in 2025. However, as of the tunnel opening in November 2025 there hasn't been any progress
Stage 3	Somerton to Craigieburn quadruplication	
Stage 4	Extension of the Upfield line to Wallan: Electrifying the Somerton link; Electrifying the regional track between Craigieburn and Wallan; Upgrading Wallan and Donnybrook stations; Constructing a new station at Lockerbie; Reopening Beveridge station	

=== Level Crossing Removals ===
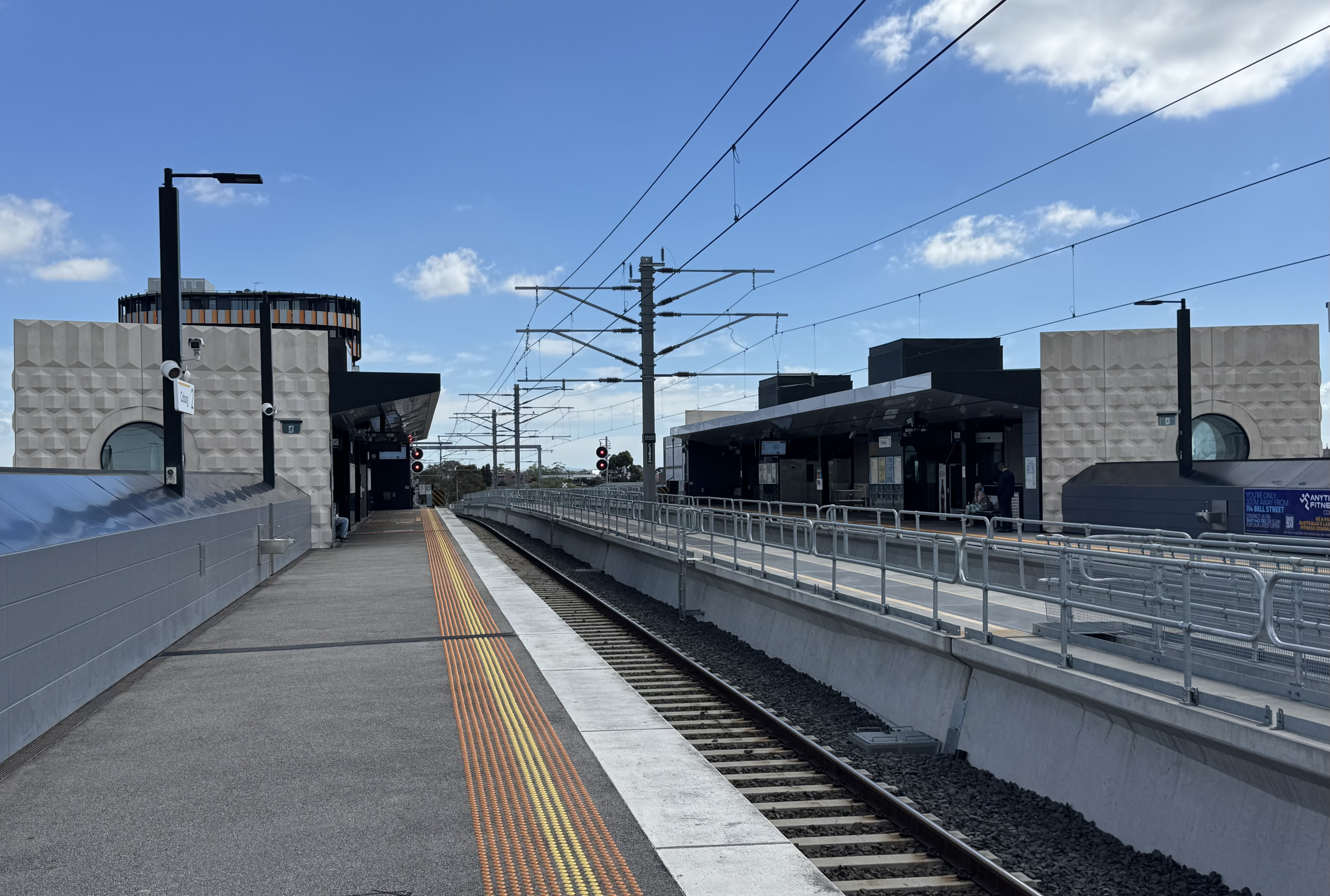
Coburg station was rebuilt in conjunction with the removal of 4 crossings.

In 2017, a level crossing was removed at Camp Road, Campbellfield by lowering the rail line underneath the road. The rail line was elevated from Coburg to Moreland stations in 2020 to remove four level crossings. Crossings were removed at Bell Street, Moreland Road, Munro Street, and Reynard Street, with both Coburg and Moreland stations rebuilt as part of these removals.

Eight further level crossings between Anstey and Royal Park stations are planned to be removed by 2033, at Albert Street, Albion Street, Brunswick Road, Dawson Street, Hope Street, Union Street, Victoria Street, and Park Street. At the end of these removals, the Upfield line will have 10 remaining crossings not slated for removal. As part of this project, Jewell, Brunswick and Anstey stations are set to be closed and replaced by two new stations: the new northern station is currently planned to be located near Hope Street, approximately 200 metres south of the current Anstey station, and the new southern station is planned to be located between Union Street and Dawson Street, approximately 200 metres north of the current Jewell station. Both stations will be approximately 450 metres away from the current Brunswick station.

The decision to build two stations in different locations instead of rebuilding all three generated criticism from residents and the local council. Local newspaper Brunswick Voice reported that the Minister for Transport Infrastructure, Danny Pearson, claimed "the decision to build two stations followed 18 months of technical and engineering assessments which found fewer stations would boost capacity on the line in the future and deliver more open space", noting that "[the government claimed] the plan would also minimise the impact to heritage in the area, but [the politician] provided no detail about whether the three station buildings and the historic boom gate operators' cabins would be preserved".

=== Upfield line duplication ===
In September 2026 in the lead up to the 2026 Victorian state election, the Victorian Labor Party made an election promise to duplicate 4 km (2.5 mi) section of the single track between Gowrie and Upfield stations, which it currently causes infrequent services, bottlenecks and delays for passengers. This project is intended to deliver more services and slash wait times. It will also deliver a second platform at Upfield and possibly a rebuild of Gowrie station.

The funding commitment of $80 million until 2028 for initial works on the duplication was also announced at the same time, and costs for the duplication estimated between $60 million and $1.4 billion.

This project also delayed the removal of eight level crossings in Brunswick, pushed from 2030 to 2033 and the completion date for the duplication have not been announced.

== Network and operations ==
=== Services ===
Services on the Upfield line operates from approximately 5:00 am to around 12:00 daily. The Upfield line has one of the least-frequent peak-period services in Melbourne's railway network due to the single track between Gowrie and Upfield. This results in peak train frequencies being every 15–20 minutes, while outside the peak the frequency is reduced to 20–30 minutes throughout the entire route. On Friday and Saturday nights, services run 24 hours a day, with 60-minute frequencies available outside of normal operating hours. On Wednesdays, some Upfield line services terminate at Batman, operating as limited-stop trains via Flinders Street, Southern Cross, North Melbourne, Royal Park and Coburg, and return to the city via the City Loop.

Train services on the Upfield line are also subjected to maintenance and renewal works, usually on selected Fridays and Saturdays. Shuttle bus services are provided throughout the duration of works for affected commuters.

==== Stopping patterns ====
Legend — Station status

- ◼ Premium Station – Station staffed from first to last train
- ◻ Host Station – Usually staffed during morning peak, however this can vary for different stations on the network.

Legend — Stopping patterns
Some services do not operate via the City Loop

- ● – All trains stop
- ◐ – Some services do not stop
- ▲ - Only inbound trains stop
- ▼ - Only outbound trains stop
- | – Trains pass and do not stop

Upfield Services
Station	Zone	Upfield
◼ Flagstaff	1	◐
◼ Melbourne Central	1	◐
◼ Parliament	1	◐
◼ Flinders Street	1	●
◼ Southern Cross	1	◐
◼ North Melbourne	1	●
Macaulay	1	●
Flemington Bridge	1	●
Royal Park	1	●
Jewell	1	●
Brunswick	1	●
Anstey	1	●
Moreland	1	●
◼ Coburg	1	●
Batman	1/2	●
Merlynston	1/2	●
Fawkner	1/2	●
◼ Gowrie	2	●
◼ Upfield	2	●

=== Operators ===
The Upfield line has had a total of seven operators since its opened in 1884. The majority of operations throughout its history have been government run: from its first service in 1884 until the 1999 privatisation of Melbourne's rail network, four different government operators have run the line. These operators, Victorian Railways, the Metropolitan Transit Authority, the Public Transport Corporation, and Bayside Trains have a combined operational length of 121 years.

Bayside Trains was privatised in August 1999 and later rebranded as M>Train. In 2002, M>Train was placed into receivership and the state government regained ownership of the line, with KPMG appointed as receivers to operate M>Train on behalf of the state government. Two years later, rival train operator Connex Melbourne took over the M>Train operations including the Frankston line. Metro Trains Melbourne, the current private operator, then took over the operations in 2009. The private operators have had a combined operational period of 27 years.

Past and present operators of the Upfield line:
Operator	Assumed operations	Ceased operations	Length of operations
Victorian Railways	1884	1983	105 years
Metropolitan Transit Authority	1983	1989	6 years
Public Transport Corporation	1989	1998	9 years
Bayside Trains (government operator)	1998	1999	1 year
M>Train	1999	2004	5 years
Connex Melbourne	2004	2009	5 years
Metro Trains Melbourne	2009	incumbent	16 years (ongoing)

=== Route ===
Interactive map of the Upfield line in northern Melbourne.

Upfield (physical track)

Overview
- Status: Operational with passenger services from Flinders Street to Upfield
- Owner: Victorian Railways (VR) (1884–1974); VR as VicRail (1974–1983); MTA (The Met) (1983–1989); PTC (The Met) (1989–1997); VicTrack (1997–Current)
- Locale: Melbourne, Victoria, Australia
- Termini: Flinders Street; Upfield
- Connecting lines: All metropolitan, regional, and interstate
- Former connections: Inner Circle
- Stations: 19 current stations; 2 former station; 2 siding; 6 former sidings

Service
- Services: Upfield

History
- Work began: 9 September 1884
- Opened: Southern Cross to North Melbourne on 17 January 1859; To Coburg on 9 September 1884; To Somerton on 8 October 1889; Flinders Street to Southern Cross on 29 November 1891
- Completed: 29 November 1891
- Reopened: Coburg to Fawkner (Cemetery traffic only) on 10 December 1906; Coburg to Fawkner on 1 October 1914; Fawkner to Somerton on 5 March 1928; Upfield to Somerton on 19 July 1959; Fawkner to Upfield on 17 August 1959
- Electrified: Flinders Street to North Melbourne on 28 May 1919; North Melbourne to Fawkner on 2 December 1920; Fawkner to Upfield on 17 August 1959
- Closed: Coburg to Somerton on 13 July 1903; Fawkner to Somerton on 5 May 1956

Technical
- Line length: 23.289 km (14.47 mi)
- Num of tracks: Six tracks: Flinders Street to North Melbourne; Double track: North Melbourne to Gowrie; Single track: Gowrie to Somerton
- Track gauge: 1,600 mm (5 ft 3 in)
- Electrification: 1500 V DC overhead
- Operating speed: 80 km/h (50 mph) – Electric; 65 km/h (40 mph) – Diesel
- Signalling: Automatic block signalling
- Maximum incline: 1 in 50 (2%)

The Upfield line forms a linear route from the Melbourne central business district to its terminus in Upfield. The route is 20.1 kilometres (12.5 mi) long, making it the fifth shortest line on the Melbourne metropolitan network. The line is double track from the city to Gowrie with the remainder of the line to Upfield being single tack. The only underground section of the Upfield line is in the City Loop, where the service stops at three underground stations. Exiting the city, the Upfield line traverses mainly flat country with few curves and fairly minimal earthworks for most of the line. Some sections of the line have been elevated or lowered into a cutting to eliminate level crossings. Despite some removals, there are a number of level crossings still present with no current plans to remove them. Rare in Melbourne, the line travels underneath the CityLink tollway beside the Moonee Ponds Creek for a portion of the line, before rising up a lengthy hill and winding through Royal Park until it reaches Jewell railway station.

The line follows the same alignment as multiple lines with the Upfield line splitting off at North Melbourne. The Upfield line continues on its northern alignment, whereas the other lines continue onto a western or south-western alignment. Most of the rail line goes through built-up suburbs and some industrial areas.

=== Stations ===
The line serves 19 stations across 20.1 kilometres (12.5 mi) of track. The stations are a mix of elevated, lowered, underground, and ground level designs. Underground stations are present only in the City Loop, with the majority of elevated and lowered stations being constructed as part of level crossing removals. Notably, the line has one of the lowest proportion of premium stations amongst Melbourne's railway lines, with only three stations past the North Melbourne junction classified as premium stations.

Station	Image	Accessibility	Opened	Terrain	Train connections	Other connections
Flinders Street		Yes—step free access	1854	Lowered	13 connections: * Alamein line; Belgrave line; Craigieburn line; Flemington Racecourse line; Frankston line; Gippsland line; Glen Waverley line; Hurstbridge line; Lilydale line; Mernda line; Sandringham line; Werribee line; Williamstown line	Trams Buses
Southern Cross		Yes—step free access	1859	Ground level	25 connections: * Alamein line; Albury line; Ararat line; Ballarat line; Belgrave line; Bendigo line; Craigieburn line; Echuca line; Flemington Racecourse line; Frankston line; Geelong line; Gippsland line; Glen Waverley line; Hurstbridge line; Lilydale line; Maryborough line; Mernda line; NSW TrainLink Southern; Seymour line; Shepparton line; Swan Hill line; The Overland; Warrnambool line; Werribee line; Williamstown line	Trams Buses Coaches SkyBus
Parliament		Yes—step free access	1983	Underground	8 connections: * Alamein line; Belgrave line; Craigieburn line; Frankston line; Glen Waverley line; Hurstbridge line; Lilydale line; Mernda line	Trams
Melbourne Central		Yes—step free access	1981	Underground	8 connections: * Alamein line; Belgrave line; Craigieburn line; Frankston line; Glen Waverley line; Hurstbridge line; Lilydale line; Mernda line	Trams Buses
Flagstaff		Yes—step free access	1985	Underground	8 connections: * Alamein line; Belgrave line; Craigieburn line; Frankston line; Glen Waverley line; Hurstbridge line; Lilydale line; Mernda line	Trams
North Melbourne		Yes—step free access	1859	Ground level	6 connections: * Craigieburn line; Flemington Racecourse line; Seymour line; Shepparton line; Werribee line; Williamstown line	Buses
Macaulay		Yes—step free access	1887	Ground level		Buses
Flemington Bridge		No—steep ramp	1885	Elevated		Trams Buses
Royal Park		Yes—step free access	1884	Ground level		Trams Buses
Jewell		No—steep ramp	1884	Ground level		Trams Buses
Brunswick		Yes—step free access	1884	Ground level		Trams Buses
Anstey		Yes—step free access	1926	Ground level		Trams Buses
Moreland		Yes—step free access	1884	Elevated		Trams Buses
Coburg		Yes—step free access	1884	Elevated		Trams Buses Coaches
Batman		Yes—step free access	1889	Ground level		Trams Buses
Merlynston		Yes—step free access	1889	Ground level		Buses
Fawkner		Yes—step free access	1889	Ground level		Buses
Gowrie		Yes—step free access	1928	Ground level		Buses
Upfield		Yes—step free access	1889	Ground level		Buses

Station histories
Station	Opened	Closed	Age	Notes
Flagstaff	27 May 1985		41 years	
Melbourne Central	26 January 1981		45 years	Formerly Museum
Parliament	22 January 1983		43 years	
Flinders Street	12 September 1854		172 years	Formerly Melbourne Terminus
Southern Cross	17 January 1859		167 years	Formerly Batman's Hill; Formerly Spencer Street
North Melbourne	6 October 1859		167 years	
Macaulay Stabling Sidings and Light Repair Centre	?			
Arden Street Sidings	?	?		
Macaulay	1 December 1887		138 years	Formerly Macaulay Road; Located under CityLink
Flemington Bridge	10 April 1885		141 years	Formerly Flemington
Royal Park	9 September 1884		142 years	
Jewell	9 September 1884		142 years	Formerly South Brunswick
Brunswick	9 September 1884		142 years	
Anstey	13 December 1926		99 years	Formerly North Brunswick
Moreland	9 September 1884		142 years	
Coburg	9 September 1884		142 years	
Batman	8 October 1889	13 July 1903	13 years	Was originally Bell Park
Batman	1 October 1914		112 years	Reopened as Batman
Merlynston	8 October 1889	13 July 1903	13 years	Formerly North Coburg
Merlynston	1 October 1914		112 years	Formerly North Coburg
Fawkner	8 October 1889	13 July 1903	13 years	
Fawkner	12 December 1906		119 years	Reopened as Fawkner Cemetery
RMSP 13	5 March 1928	5 May 1956	28 years	Approx. near Box Forest Road
Gowrie	c. 16 October 1928	5 May 1956	Approx. 27 years	Formerly RMSP 21
Gowrie	16 May 1965		61 years	
RMSP 23	c. 16 July 1929	5 May 1956	Approx. 26 years	Approx. near Camp Road
Campbellfield	8 October 1889	13 July 1903	13 years	
Campbellfield	5 March 1928	5 May 1956	28 years	Reopened as Campbellfield RMSP
RMSP 18	c. 24 April 1928	5 May 1956	Approx. 28 years	Incorrectly numbered RMSP 15 in 1928; Approx. near Sunshine Street
RMSP 14	5 March 1928	5 May 1956	28 years	Approx. near Herbert Street
Upfield	8 October 1889	13 July 1903	13 years	Was originally North Campbellfield
Upfield	5 March 1928	5 May 1956	28 years	Reopened as North Campbellfield RMSP
Upfield	17 August 1959		67 years	Reopened as Upfield
Tubemakers of Australia Ltd. Sidings	28 August 1962	?		Formerly Metters Clow Siding; Formerly Station Pipes Australia Siding
Ford Sidings (broad gauge)	19 July 1959	2 May 1997	37 years	Dual gauge
Ford Sidings (standard gauge)	11 January 1963	?		
Union Steel Pty. Ltd. Sidings	21 January 1975	2 May 1997	22 years	Standard gauge only
Kauri Timber Co. Ltd. Siding	18 September 1969	2 May 1997	27 years	Dual gauge; Formerly Shaw's Siding
Clyde Industries Ltd. Siding	10 December 1959	?		Broad gauge only; Formerly Martin & King's Siding
Somerton	15 May 1881	24 September 1963	82 years	Between 1889 and 1903 connected to platform.; Between 1928 and 1956 railmotor stop near platform (not connected to platform)
Somerton Yard	8 October 1889	5 October 1903	13 years	
Somerton Yard	24 January 1912		114 years	

== Infrastructure ==
=== Rolling stock ===
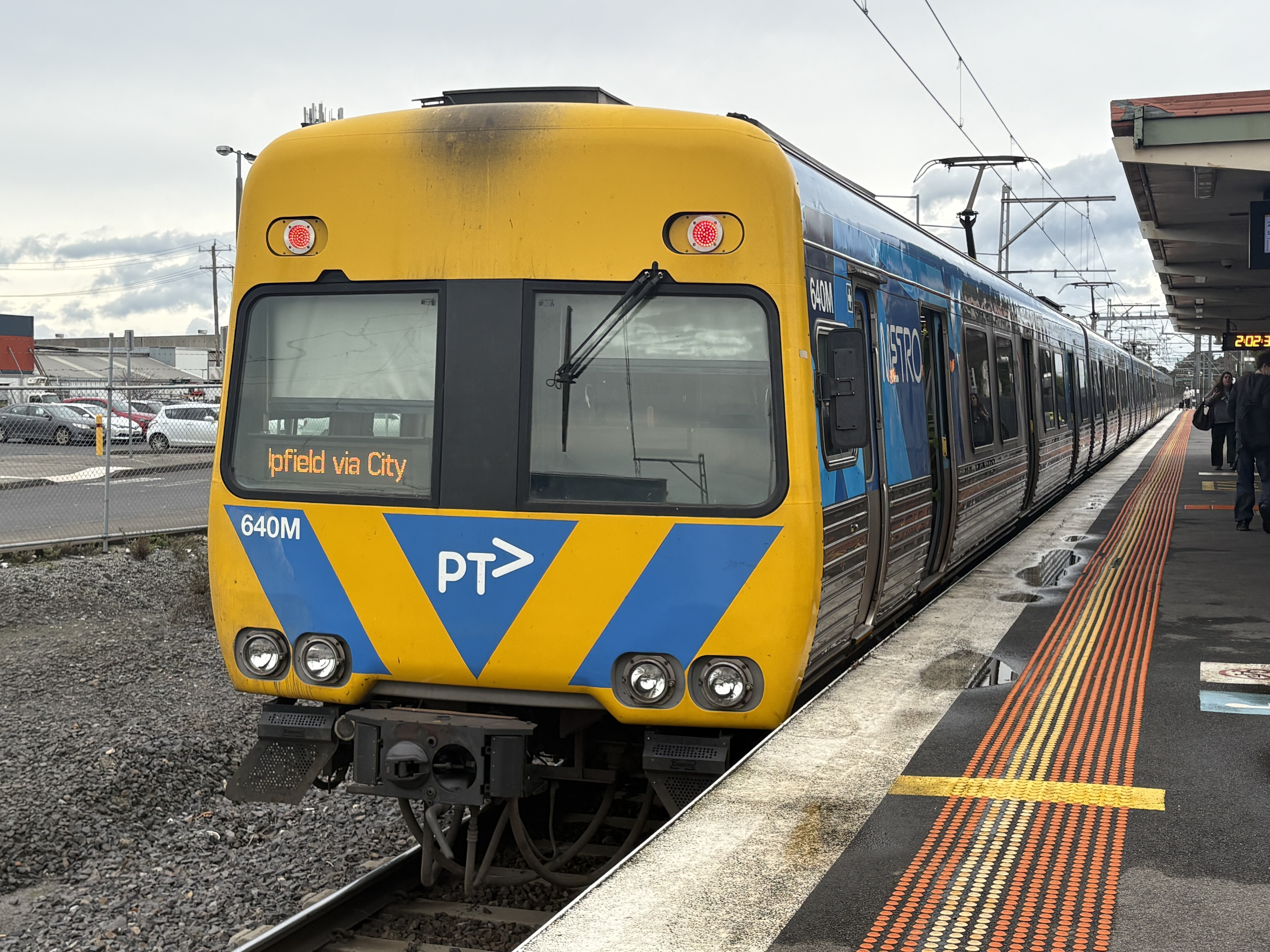
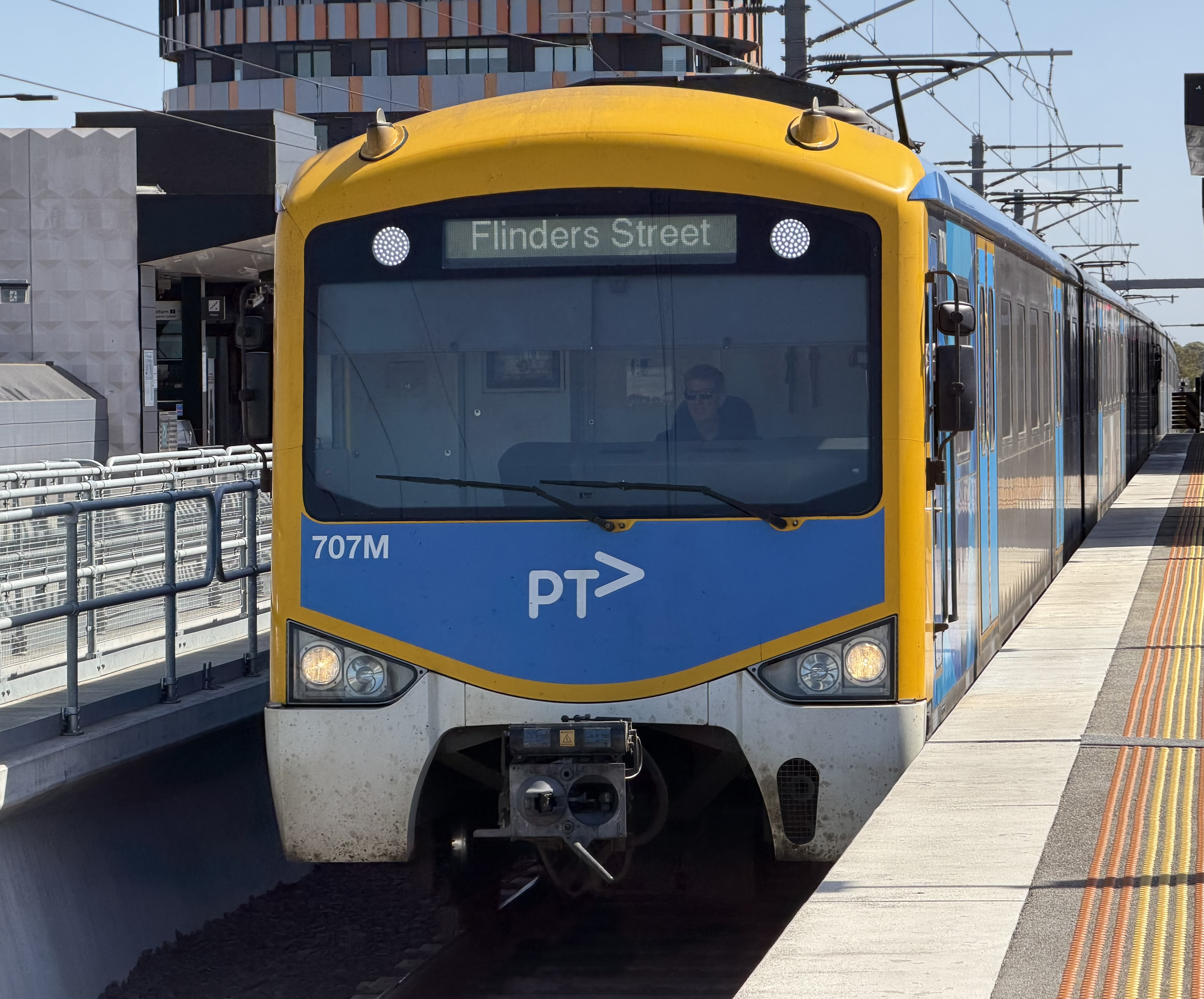
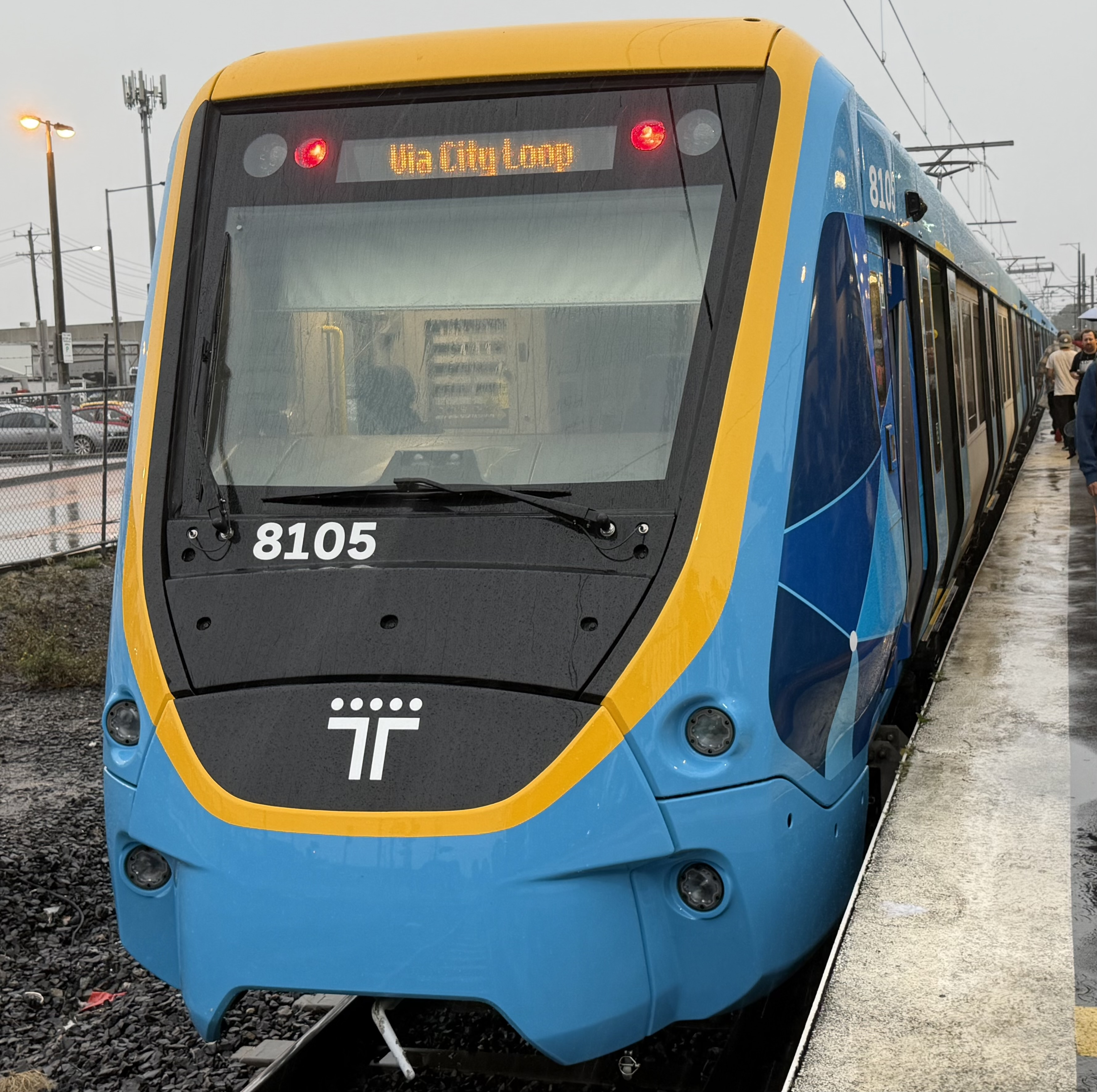
The Comeng, Siemens Nexas and X'Trapolis 2.0 trains are the current types of trains used on the Upfield line

The Upfield line uses three different types of electric multiple unit (EMU) trains that are operated in a split six-car configuration. The rarer rolling stock featured on the line is the Comeng EMUs, built by Commonwealth Engineering between 1981 and 1988. These train sets are the oldest on the Melbourne rail network and subsequently are planned to be replaced by 2026. The more common of rolling stock is the Siemens Nexas EMUs which are widely featured on the line, originally built between 2002 and 2005 these train sets feature more modern technology than the Comeng trains.

The X'Trapolis 2.0 EMUs, built from 2024 onwards are starting to roll out on the Upfield line to replace the existing aging Comeng fleet and started entering service on the Upfield line in May 2026. The X'Trapolis 2.0 trains are fixed 6 car sets with fully walk through carriages and are new, modern and technologically advanced. The features of the X'Trapolis 2.0 trains include wide and modernised doors to reduce the boarding times at stations to under 40 seconds, Passenger information systems to display the train's journey in real time, higher energy efficiency to work with a lower network voltage, to fit in with modern rail systems overseas, designated bicycle storage areas and passenger operated automatic wheelchair ramps located behind the drivers cabs.

Alongside the passenger trains, Upfield line tracks and equipment are maintained by a fleet of engineering trains. The four types of engineering trains are: the shunting train; designed for moving trains along non-electrified corridors and for transporting other maintenance locomotives, for track evaluation; designed for evaluating track and its condition, the overhead inspection train; designed for overhead wiring inspection, and the infrastructure evaluation carriage designed for general infrastructure evaluation. Most of these trains are repurposed locomotives previously used by V/Line, Metro Trains, and the Southern Shorthaul Railroad.

=== Accessibility ===
In compliance with the Disability Discrimination Act of 1992, all stations that are new-built or rebuilt are fully accessible and comply with these guidelines. The majority of the stations on the corridor are fully accessible, however, there are some stations that haven't been upgraded to meet these guidelines. These stations do feature ramps, however, they have a gradient greater than 1 in 14. Stations that are fully accessible feature ramps that have a gradient less than 1 in 14, have at-grade paths, or feature lifts. These stations typically also feature tactile boarding indicators, independent boarding ramps, wheelchair accessible myki barriers, hearing loops, and widened paths.

Projects improving station accessibility have included the Level Crossing Removal Project, which involves station rebuilds and upgrades, and individual station upgrade projects. More than 90% of Upfield line stations are now classed as fully accessible. Future station upgrade projects are planned to increase the number of fully accessible stations over time.

=== Signalling ===
The Upfield line uses three-position signalling which is widely used across the Melbourne train network. Three-position signalling was first introduced in 1928, with the final section of the line converted to the new type of signalling in 1972.

== See also ==
- List of places on the Victorian Heritage Register in the City of Melbourne
- List of places on the Victorian Heritage Register in the City of Merri-bek
