= Anstey railway station =

Railway station in Melbourne, Australia

Anstey
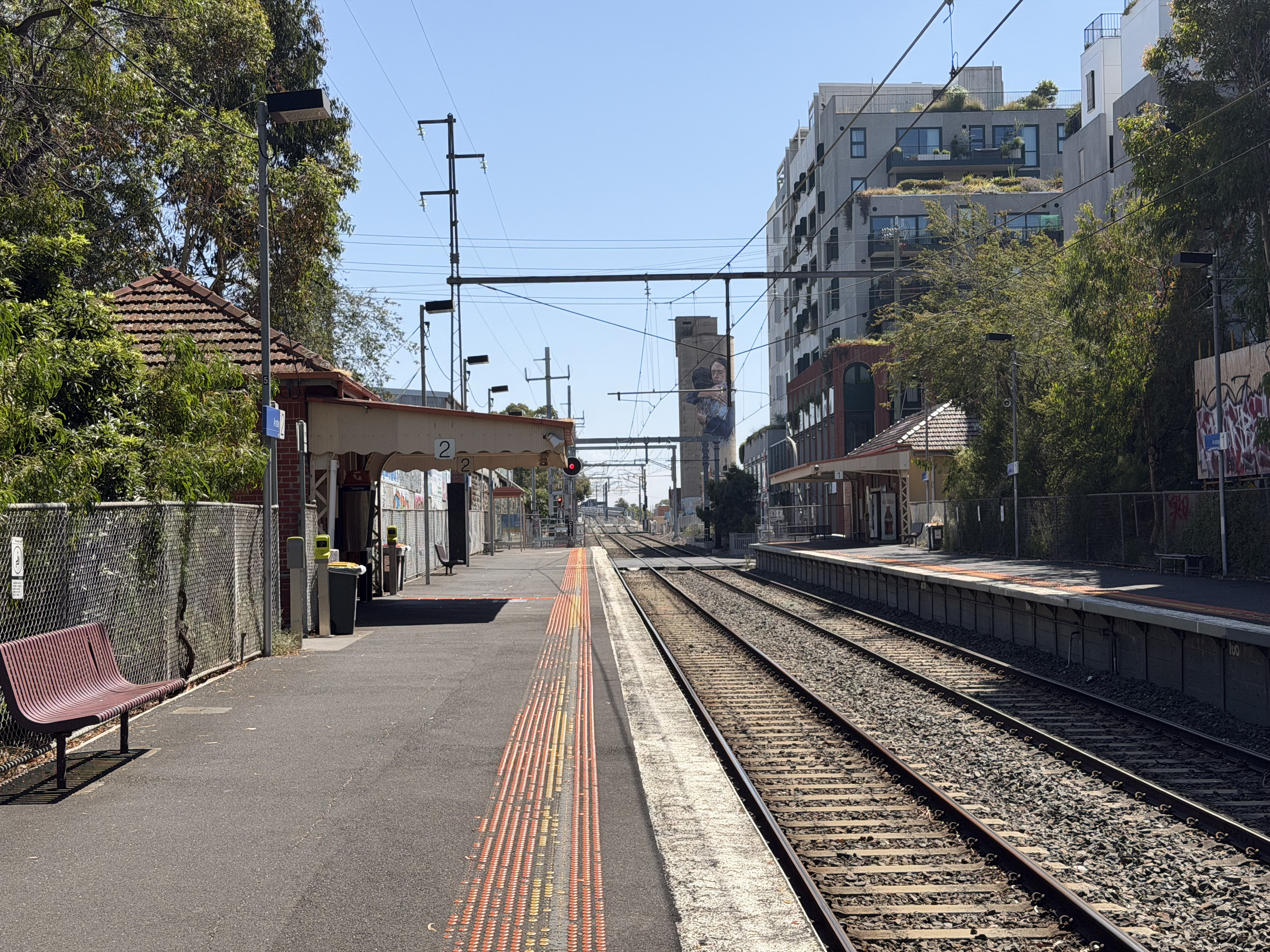
- Northbound view from Platform 2, February 2026

General information
- Location: Albion Street, Brunswick, Victoria 3056; City of Merri-bek; Australia
- Coordinates: 37°45′40″S 144°57′38″E
- System: PTV commuter rail station
- Owner: VicTrack
- Operator: Metro Trains
- Line: Upfield
- Distance: 8.04 kilometres from Southern Cross
- Platforms: 2 side
- Tracks: 2
- Connections: Bus; Tram

Construction
- Structure type: Ground
- Parking: Yes
- Accessible: Yes—step-free access

Other information
- Status: Operational, unstaffed
- Station code: ASY
- Fare zone: Myki zone 1
- Website: Public Transport Victoria

History
- Opened: 15 December 1926; 99 years ago
- Electrified: December 1920 (1500 V DC overhead)
- Former names: North Brunswick (1926–1942)

Passengers
- 2005–2006: 241,907
- 2006–2007: 275,590 ▲13.92%
- 2007–2008: 302,529 ▲9.77%
- 2008–2009: 353,803 ▲16.94%
- 2009–2010: 379,469 ▲7.25%
- 2010–2011: 376,610 ▼0.75%
- 2011–2012: 361,545 ▼4%
- 2012–2013: Not measured
- 2013–2014: 371,192 ▲2.67%
- 2014–2015: 396,224 ▲6.74%
- 2015–2016: 406,596 ▲2.61%
- 2016–2017: 433,444 ▲6.6%
- 2017–2018: 460,890 ▲6.33%
- 2018–2019: 468,600 ▲1.67%
- 2019–2020: 357,050 ▼23.8%
- 2020–2021: 159,900 ▼55.2%
- 2021–2022: 187,400 ▲17.19%
- 2022–2023: 263,200 ▲40.45%
- 2023–2024: 358,900 ▲36.36%
- 2024–2025: 365,100 ▲1.72%

Services
Preceding station	Metro Trains	Following station
Brunswick towards Flinders Street	Upfield line	Moreland towards Upfield
Track layout
Location

Anstey station is a railway station operated by Metro Trains Melbourne on the Upfield line, part of the Melbourne rail network. It serves the northern suburb of Brunswick in Melbourne, Victoria, Australia. Anstey station is a ground-level unstaffed station, featuring two side platforms. It opened on 15 December 1926.

Initially opened as North Brunswick, the station was given its current name of Anstey on 1 December 1942.

== History ==
Anstey station was renamed in honour of former member of parliament, Frank Anstey, who represented the local area in the seats of East Bourke Boroughs and Brunswick in the state parliament, and Burke in the federal parliament, between 1902 and 1934.

In 1971, the station platforms were lengthened. In 1998, boom barriers replaced interlocked gates at the Albion Street level crossing, at the down end of the station. The signal box controlling the level crossing was also abolished during that time.

In 2020, the station became a temporary terminus while level crossing removals occurred at Coburg and Moreland. A temporary turnout was provided at the up end of the station, to allow trains to terminate and return to Flinders Street. The turnout was removed upon the completion of works.

=== Future ===
The station is slated for closure or relocation under the Level Crossing Removal Project. The project intends to remove the adjacent Albion Street level crossing, as well as seven other level crossings in Brunswick, by grade separation to become an elevated. Under the plan, announced in 2024 and expected to be completed in 2030 the three nearby stations of Jewell, Brunswick and Anstey will be replaced by two new stations, each within 200 metres (660 ft) to 450 metres (1,480 ft) of one of the existing stations: the new northern station nearer Anstey is planned to be located next to Hope Street. Some heritage listed interlocking hand gates at some closed level crossings will be kept and located at their current spots.

The decision to build two stations in different locations instead of rebuilding Jewell, Brunswick and Anstey generated criticism from residents and the local council. Local newspaper Brunswick Voice reported that the Minister for Transport Infrastructure, Danny Pearson, claimed "the decision to build two stations followed 18 months of technical and engineering assessments which found fewer stations would boost capacity on the line in the future and deliver more open space", noting that "the government claimed the plan would also minimise the impact to heritage in the area, but the politician provided no detail about whether the three station buildings and the historic boom gate operators' cabins would be preserved".

== Platforms and services ==
Anstey has two side platforms. It is served by Upfield line trains.

Anstey platform arrangement
Platform	Line	Destination	Via	Service Type	Notes	Source
1	Upfield line	Flinders Street	City Loop	All stations	See City Loop for operating patterns	
2	Upfield line	Upfield		All stations		

== Transport links ==
Kinetic Melbourne operates one route via Anstey station:

- 503 : Essendon station – Brunswick East

Yarra Trams operates one route via Anstey station:

- : North Coburg – Flinders Street station (via Elizabeth Street)

== Gallery ==
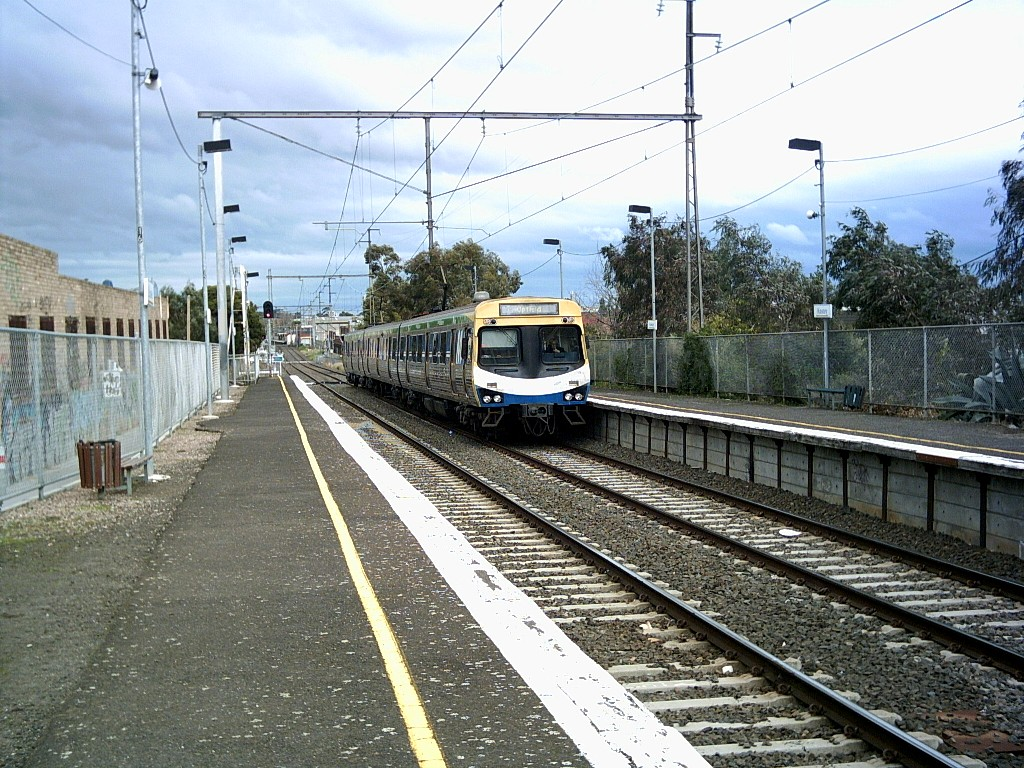
Southbound view from Platform 1, with an Upfield bound Comeng train arriving on Platform 2,
June 2004

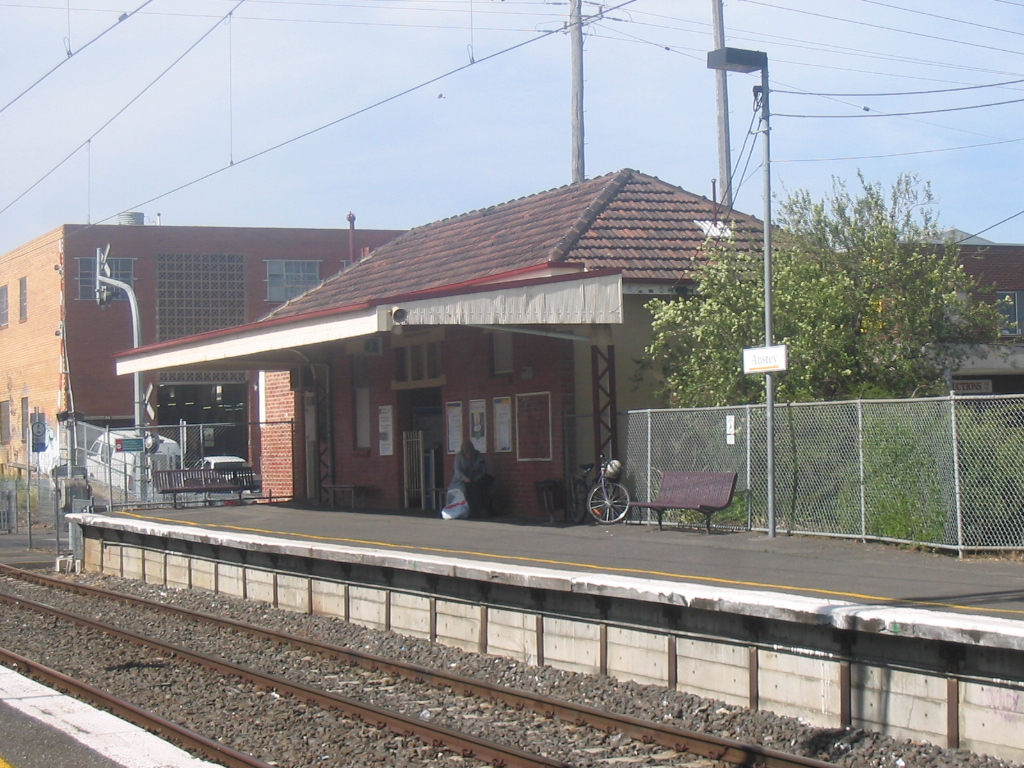
Northbound view of Platform 1 and station building, December 2005
