= Fawkner railway station =

Railway station in Melbourne, Australia

Fawkner
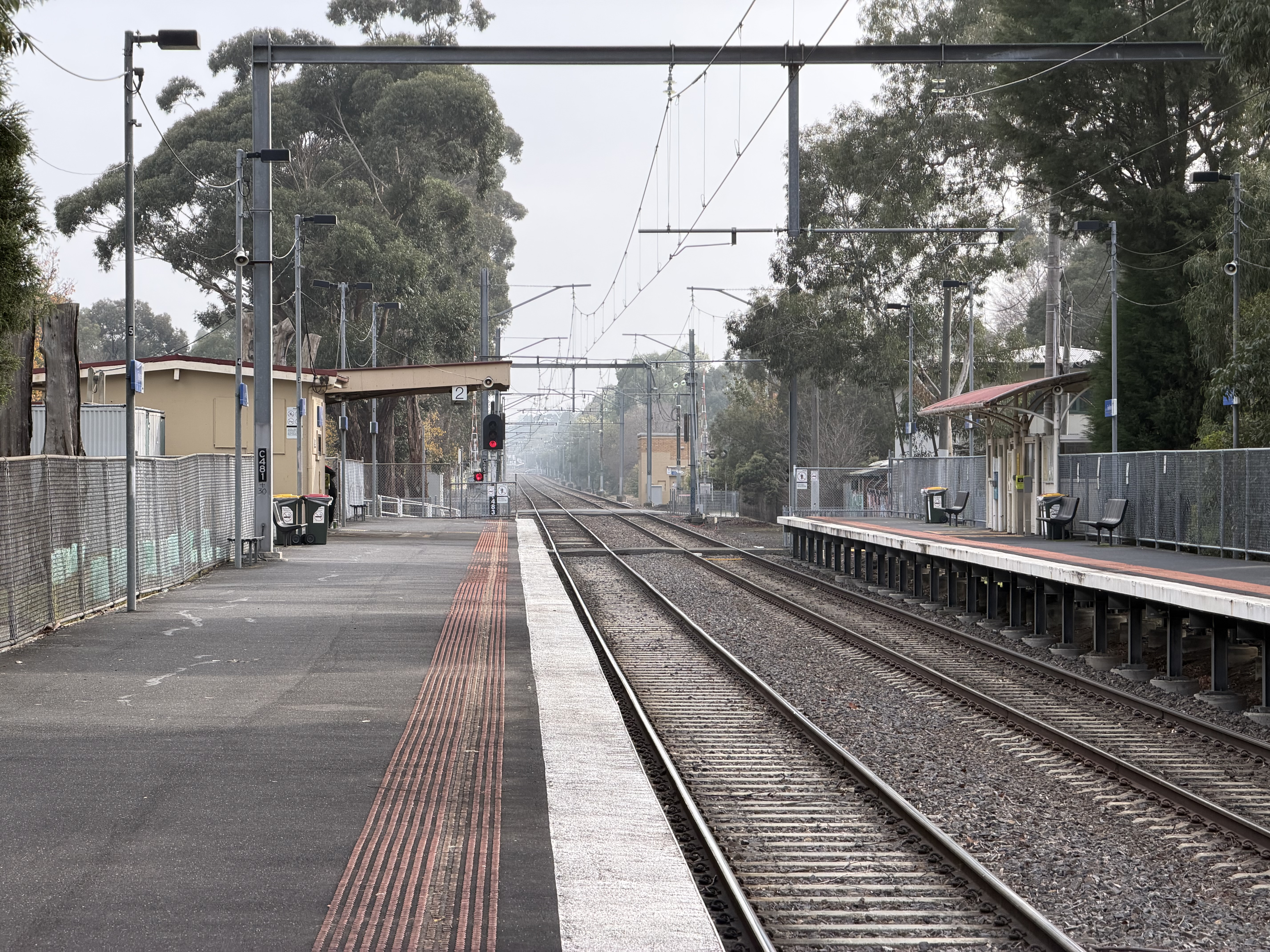
- Northbound view from Platform 2, June 2026

General information
- Location: Sydney Road, Hadfield, Victoria 3046; City of Merri-bek; Australia
- Coordinates: 37°42′53″S 144°57′38″E
- System: PTV commuter rail station
- Owner: VicTrack
- Operator: Metro Trains
- Line: Upfield
- Distance: 13.23 kilometres from Southern Cross
- Platforms: 2 side
- Tracks: 2
- Connections: Bus

Construction
- Structure type: Ground
- Parking: 80
- Cycle facilities: Yes
- Accessible: Yes—step free access

Other information
- Status: Operational, unstaffed
- Station code: FAK
- Fare zone: Myki zone 1/2
- Website: Public Transport Victoria

History
- Opened: 8 October 1889; 136 years ago
- Closed: 13 July 1903
- Rebuilt: 12 December 1906; 16 November 1998
- Electrified: December 1920 (1500 V DC overhead)
- Former names: Fawkner Cemetery (1906–1914)

Passengers
- 2005–2006: 131,392
- 2006–2007: 151,250 ▲15.11%
- 2007–2008: 179,541 ▲18.7%
- 2008–2009: 207,991 ▲15.84%
- 2009–2010: 218,950 ▲5.27%
- 2010–2011: 189,029 ▼13.67%
- 2011–2012: 171,260 ▼9.4%
- 2012–2013: Not measured
- 2013–2014: 192,126 ▲12.18%
- 2014–2015: 183,341 ▼4.57%
- 2015–2016: 180,751 ▼5.92%
- 2016–2017: 176,391 ▼2.41%
- 2017–2018: 176,420 ▲0.01%
- 2018–2019: 215,100 ▲21.92%
- 2019–2020: 165,300 ▼23.15%
- 2020–2021: 66,600 ▼59.7%
- 2021–2022: 86,400 ▲29.73%
- 2022–2023: 124,050 ▲43.58%
- 2023–2024: 147,500 ▲18.9%
- 2024–2025: 146,600 ▼0.61%

Services
| Preceding station | Metro Trains | Following station |
|---|---|---|
| Merlynston towards Flinders Street | Upfield line | Gowrie towards Upfield |
Former Services
| Preceding station | VicRail | Following station |
|---|---|---|
| Terminus | Fawkner-Somerton line | Campbellfield towards Somerton |
List of closed railway stations in Melbourne
Track layout
Location

Fawkner station is a railway station operated by Metro Trains Melbourne on the Upfield line, part of the Melbourne rail network. It serves the northern suburb of Hadfield in Melbourne, Victoria, Australia. Fawkner station is a ground-level unstaffed station, featuring two side platforms. It opened on 8 October 1889, with the current station provided in 1998. It initially closed on 13 July 1903, then reopened on 12 December 1906.

Initially opened as Fawkner, the station was renamed two times. It was renamed to Fawkner Cemetery upon its reopening on 12 December 1906, then was given its current name of Fawkner in 1914.

== History ==
Fawkner station originally opened on 8 October 1889, when the railway line from Coburg was extended to Somerton. Like the suburb itself, the station was named after John Pascoe Fawkner, one of the founders of Melbourne.

It is located adjacent to the Fawkner Crematorium and Memorial Park, which opened in 1906, and from then until 1939, special mortuary trains operated. From October 1914, only seven trains operated to Fawkner daily, as well as the daily mortuary train to the cemetery. A former mortuary van is located near the entrance to Platform 2.

From 1920, Fawkner was the extent of suburban electrified services. In 1928, the line beyond Fawkner was reopened, and an AEC railmotor was used to provide a connecting service north to the end of the line at Somerton. That service lasted until 1956, when the line beyond Fawkner was closed for the second time. But three years later in 1959, the line reopened again and electrified services were extended to Upfield.

Also in 1959, flashing light signals were provided at the Cemetery Entrance level crossing, located nearby in the down direction of the station, and the line from Coburg was duplicated. However, the duplicated line converged at the up end of the station and, until 1998, the station had one platform (present day Platform 2). The second track and Platform 1 were added as part of the duplication of the line to Gowrie. Also in that year, boom barriers were provided at the Cemetery Entrance level crossing.

== Platforms and services ==
Fawkner has two side platforms. It is serviced by Metro Trains' Upfield line services.

Fawkner platform arrangement
| Platform | Line | Destination | Via | Service Type | Notes | Source |
|---|---|---|---|---|---|---|
| 1 | Upfield line | Flinders Street | City Loop | All stations | See City Loop for operating patterns | |
| 2 | Upfield line | Upfield | | All stations | | |

== Transport links ==
CDC Melbourne operates two routes via Fawkner station, under contract to Public Transport Victoria:

- 530 : Campbellfield Plaza Shopping Centre – Coburg
- 531 : Upfield station – North Coburg
