= 2003 Melbourne runaway train =

Rail accident

- Location within Melbourne

Details
- Date: 3 February 2003
- Location: Spencer Street station, Melbourne
- Coordinates: 37°49′06″S 144°57′10″E
- Line: Broadmeadows line
- Operator: M>Train
- Incident type: Runaway train
- Cause: Driver error

Statistics
- Trains: 2
- Passengers: 22 (on stationary train)
- Crew: 1 (on stationary train)
- Injured: 8

At around 9:15 pm AEDT, on 3 February 2003, a Comeng electric multiple unit train rolled away from Broadmeadows station in Melbourne, Australia, before it ran for nearly 17 kilometres (11 mi) out of control without a driver and eventually crashed into another train about to depart Spencer Street station. (Note: Spencer Street station has since been renamed Southern Cross.) Train controllers attempted several times to stop or redirect the train, but were limited in their ability to intervene, instead being forced to alter the route of other trains to avert a more serious collision.

Eleven people on board the stationary train were injured; authorities did not know until after the crash if any passengers were on board the runaway. An investigation identified driver error as the cause of the accident, but the runaway event prompted significant debate about the role of government authorities and private operators in ensuring safety and reliability on the Melbourne rail network.

== Background ==
Three days prior to the Melbourne crash, the Waterfall rail accident in New South Wales had killed seven people as a result of the train entering a curve too quickly due to incapacitation of the train's driver. The trains deadman's system was revealed to be faulty thus not automatically stopping the train when the driver became unresponsive.

The Broadmeadows railway line (Note: The electrified line was later extended to Craigieburn.) is an electrified line on the Melbourne rail network, running from the city centre to the northern suburbs. In February 2003, electric train services on the line were operated by M>Train, a subsidiary of British transport company National Express, under a franchise arrangement with the Victorian Government. The line was shared with diesel-hauled country train services operated by V/Line (then also a subsidiary of National Express) and Hoys Roadlines, and occasional freight services.

Spencer Street station (now Southern Cross) is one of the two main terminal stations on the Victorian rail network, and, in 2003, was the interchange for trains run by a number of operators, including M>Train, its fellow suburban operator Connex Melbourne, and country and interstate train operators V/Line, Hoys, West Coast Rail, CountryLink and Great Southern Rail. The station consisted of 14 platforms including dead-end platforms 1 to 8.

Given the number of operators on the Broadmeadows line (now the Craigieburn line) and in the central area, a complex control and signalling system was in place. Most of the Broadmeadows line was controlled by Metrol, the main suburban control centre managed by Connex, either directly or through local signal boxes along the route. Metrol was responsible for trains up to the station boundary, from where it was possible to access all 8 dead-end platforms. However, final access to platforms 1 through 6 at Spencer Street was controlled by V/Line staff at Spencer Street No.1 signal box, and platforms 7 and 8 were jointly managed by the two control centres.

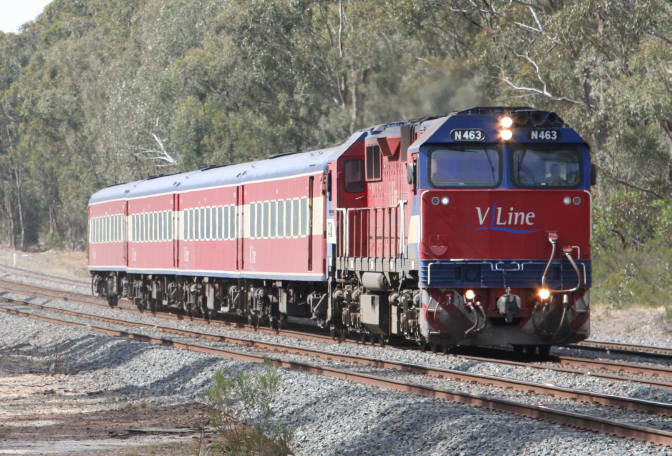
N463, the locomotive struck by the runaway train, pictured in 2007 after returning to service

The electric train involved in the accident was a 3-carriage Comeng electric multiple unit, and consisted of motor car 393M, unpowered trailer 1048T, and second motor car 394M. The country train was 4 H type carriages hauled by diesel-powered N class locomotive 463.

== Accident ==
=== Initial runaway ===
The electric train 393M-1048T-394M arrived at Broadmeadows station as train number 5859 (Note: The train describer number, or train number, uniquely identifies scheduled and unscheduled services on the Victorian railway system. It is used by Metrol and signallers to track and manage services, especially where multiple services are operating on the same line simultaneously.) from Flinders Street around 9.14 pm, where the service terminated. The driver of 5859 was rostered to also drive the return service to Flinders Street as train number 5264. After a short delay where he left the driving cab of 393M due to confusion about whether the train needed to be clear of the platform for a V/Line service towards Seymour, the driver re-entered the cab to enter the new train number into the train's computer terminal, in order to display the correct onboard passenger information. At the same time, the signaller at Broadmeadows set the train's route for its return journey and cleared the necessary signals. The driver then isolated the train's air brake, but did not apply the park brake before once again leaving the cab of 393M to change ends.

The driver walked into the station building, intending to use the staff toilet facilities before returning to the train. As he did so, the train began to roll down the very slight slope at the Broadmeadows platform back towards the city, passing the end of the platform at around 3 km/h (1.9 mph) undetected by the driver or station staff. The doors to the passenger area were open, interior lights remained on and the trains headlights were not set with the train only having its red tail lights illuminated. While the driver was inside the station building, a passenger complained to the Broadmeadows stationmaster that 5264 had departed early. The stationmaster attempted to contact the driver via the Broadmeadows signaller, but was not able to work out why the train had departed early. As he returned to the station building, the stationmaster saw the driver coming out and warned him that the train had left.

The driver ran out onto the platform where another passenger told him it’s in the direction of the city, the driver jumped onto the track and began to chase the train down the line on foot but, as the train had now been rolling for some 3 minutes, he was unable to catch it, and rang the Broadmeadows signaller from a phone box on a signal post raising the alarm. The signaller made an emergency call to Metrol and advised them of the runaway at 9:21 p.m. Metrol immediately contacted the Broadmeadows stationmaster and asked him to monitor the closed-circuit television feed at stations under his control to provide updates on the train's progress. Next, the controllers rang the stationmaster at Essendon and asked him to switch his station from Metrol operation to local control, and to provide updates from his own CCTV feed. The train was by now travelling at a speed of more than 102 km/h (63 mph).

At 9:26 p.m., Metrol made two calls to other control centres. The first was to Electrol, the electricity control centre for the suburban railway network, asking officers to turn off power to the overhead lines in the hope that this might help slow the train but this did not work. However, another stopping-all-stations train, number 5262, was ahead of the runaway and unaware of the danger; after a minute's discussion, Electrol isolated a section of power behind 5262 and ahead of the runaway. The second call was made to signallers at Spencer Street No. 1 Box, warning them that Metrol was considering routing the runaway 5264 into the station precinct on an empty platform. The signallers advised Metrol that all the dead-end platforms at Spencer Street were occupied, but Metrol ended the call abruptly without any clear plan of action. The later report into the accident found that the contents of the call suggested neither Metrol nor the Spencer Street staff understood the gravity of the situation at this point in time.

Seconds later, the Essendon stationmaster reported that the train had passed through his station at speed, making it clear that the lack of power was not going to stop the train. Metrol officers began to realise that a rear-end collision with 5262 was likely unless immediate action was taken. Consequently, the route set for 5262 was cancelled at 9:28 p.m., causing the driver to pull up at a red signal just outside North Melbourne station.

=== Near miss ===
By the time 5264 arrived at Kensington at 9:30 p.m. it was only 113 seconds behind 5262, putting both trains in grave danger. Asking the driver of 5262 to attempt to outrun the runaway would have placed the passenger-carrying train at great risk of a derailment, meaning Metrol's only option was to divert the runaway before it could collide with 5262. Even then, the options open to the controllers were limited: one possible route would have sent the speeding train onto a flying junction, with the possibility of it falling onto other active lines below; another route into goods sidings was blocked by a train in the opposite direction; and diversion into the underground City Loop was prevented by both oncoming trains from the loop and the arrangement of tracks near the entrance at North Melbourne.

Metrol officers opted to reroute 5262 from the "up east suburban line" across a pair of crossovers to the "up main suburban line", with the intention of immediately switching back the points so that 5264 continued on the east suburban line towards Spencer Street. The driver of 5262 was informed of the emergency and told to run through North Melbourne station as quickly as possible when the signal cleared. Had the driver of 5262 attempted to pass the red signal, the train stop device would have applied the emergency brake, trapping his train in the path of the runaway.

At 9:30 p.m. the points were set and the signal cleared for 5262; at the same moment, the driver saw 5264 in his rear-view mirror and accelerated rapidly through the points, far beyond their design speed of 40kph. As soon as officers at Metrol received an indication that the rear of the train had cleared the junction, the points were reversed for 5264 to continue along the up east suburban line. Briefly, however, it appeared that the diversion had been unsuccessful and a major collision had occurred: the signallers' indications showed the two trains on the same path, and controllers could not raise the driver of 5262 on the radio. Eventually, the driver of 5262 contacted Metrol and told the controllers the runaway had sped past him and continued into North Melbourne station. Later calculations showed that disaster had been averted by less than a second.

=== Collision at Spencer Street ===
Meanwhile, Metrol officers had again contacted the Spencer Street signallers to confirm their intention to route the runaway into the dead-end platforms. Allowing the train to continue on Metrol-operated tracks was not a desirable option. The East Suburban line led to a number of routes which presented the risk of catastrophic outcomes: the empty dead-end platform 8, which had only short stop blocks that could have allowed the body of the derailed train to "spear" over the top and into the passenger area of the station; sidings beyond platform 8 which were too complicated to access in the short time-frame available; and through tracks 10, 10A and 11, which would have directed the runaway into the extremely busy area around Flinders Street station, the main suburban terminus. Dead-end platform 7 was also accessible from the East Suburban line, and was occupied only by empty carriages stabled overnight for a service the following morning, but Metrol officers did not come to know this in the short decision-making time available.

A hasty agreement had been reached at 9:29 p.m. between Metrol and the Spencer Street staff that the runaway would thus be routed off the East Suburban line and onto the Country line in order to access the remainder of the dead-end platform area. All six platforms controlled by the No. 1 Box were occupied, some by empty services and others by services preparing to depart the station. The signallers had pre-set points and signals for the trains which were nearing their departure time. In order of departure, these trains were: a V/Line service to Bacchus Marsh, in platform 2; a service to Geelong in platform 4; a service to Kyneton in platform 6; and lastly The Overland, waiting in platform 1. The signallers were hopeful that The Overland would depart before the arrival of the runaway, because it was set to use the Country line out of the station. At 9:30 p.m. however, Metrol advised the No. 1 Box that the runaway was extremely close; in response, the signallers told Metrol to route it onto the East Country line instead. The points on the East Country line had been set for the departure of the Bacchus Marsh train. At 9.31, a Spencer Street signaller spotted the runaway and told Metrol "I've got him, I see him, fucking hell he's coming up hard", and urgently tried to force the points away from the Bacchus Marsh train, but was prevented by a safety timer on the signal box equipment.

About 45 seconds prior to the impact, Metrol desperately attempted to contact platform staff at the station to warn them of the impending collision. However, platform staff were confused by the simultaneous arrival of a train on platform 14 and incorrectly assumed this was the runaway. As a result, no warning was made to passengers on or near the Bacchus Marsh train. The driver of the Bacchus Marsh train, Michael McCormack, did not initially realise the severity of the situation when the runaway approached, assuming that it was performing a normal shunting move; he jumped clear only at the last second when he realised that the train was well over normal speed and not going to stop.

Finally, at 9:33 p.m., the runaway collided with the locomotive of the Bacchus Marsh train, at a speed of approximately 75 km/h (47 mph).

== Aftermath ==
Eight passengers on the Bacchus Marsh train suffered minor injuries. Four required hospitalisation and were treated at Footscray Hospital, but all had been discharged by the following morning.

Victoria Police Air Wing helicopters equipped with infrared cameras were deployed throughout the night along the Broadmeadows line to search for bodies of potential victims struck by the train, but none were found.

Within a few days of the accident, investigations had been launched by M>Train and V/Line, the Australian Transport Safety Bureau (ATSB), Victoria Police and WorkSafe Victoria. Meanwhile, media speculation focused on the inability of controllers to stop the train, and the possibility that a brake fault reported on 31 January had contributed to the accident. The police investigation quickly ruled out any criminal involvement in the accident, and the Rail Safety Regulator, an independent government body, issued immediate instructions to drivers to ensure trains were properly secured with the park brake when left unattended or during a change of ends. As questions were raised about the failure of authorities to warn passengers and staff at Spencer Street, opposition parties criticised the state government for failing to act on recommendations made following previous accidents caused by communications failures.

Some months after the accident, with the ATSB report and other investigations not finalised, Victorian authorities were criticised for their apparent lack of transparency, and compared unfavourably to NSW regulators responding to the Waterfall accident. Then, in mid-November, when a shunting accident at Spencer Street injured 13 people in circumstances compared by passengers and media organisations to the runaway, concerns were repeated that no findings had been made.

The ATSB report was released in December 2003, with the driver's failure to apply the park brake identified as the major cause of the accident. Transport Minister Peter Batchelor praised the signal and control staff who had managed to avert a collision with 5262 at North Melbourne, and said that disciplinary action against the driver of 5264 would be considered. The state government promised to implement all 22 recommendations made by the report, including the implementation of an automatic park brake activated by the isolation of the driver's controls, and improvements to Metrol systems that would provide controllers with visual indications of trains across the network.

The runaway train again received media coverage in 2007 when Connex – by then the sole franchisee for the metropolitan rail network and thus the operator of Metrol – conceded that no improvements had been made since the accident to Metrol's train monitoring ability. Public transport advocates and Rail, Tram and Bus Union representatives argued that the accident could have been dealt with more swiftly had Metrol been able to access more information on the train's position. In May 2007, Minister for Public Transport Lynne Kosky and Director of Public Transport Jim Betts gave evidence at the Public Accounts and Estimates Committee of the Victorian Parliament that the automatic park brake had been installed across the metropolitan train fleet. However, they stated that further indications for Metrol officers would not be possible until the underlying architecture of the Metrol system was replaced.

In the following years, a National Transport Commission report observed that the runaway, along with the Waterfall accident, had focused political attention on the regulatory frameworks intended to govern safety on the disaggregated and privatised rail transport system. The NTC report found that the runaway incident highlighted the need for a legislation demanding independent investigation of major rail safety incidents and accidents. The Rail Safety Act 2006, which implemented a complete rail safety framework in Victoria for the first time, was prioritised and passed in direct response to the incident.

Ten years later, with the ageing train control systems at Metrol still overdue for replacement, the accident was again cited as an example of the significant limitations of the existing arrangement.

== See also ==
- 1890 Bathurst railway collision — Involved the collision of a goods train with the runaway carriages of a mixed train that rolled down a hill.
- Railway accidents in Victoria

== Bibliography ==
- Runaway of Suburban Electric Passenger Train 5264 and collision with Diesel Locomotive Hauled Passenger Train 8141 (PDF). Canberra: Australian Transport Safety Bureau. October 2003.
