= Z28 =

Z28 may refer to:

- German destroyer Z28, one of fifteen Type 1936A destroyers built for the Kriegsmarine
- New South Wales Z28 class locomotive, an amalgamation under one class of two former classes
- Z28, a model of the mid-size American automobile Chevrolet Camaro
- "Z28", a song from the 2009 Static-X album Cult of Static
