= 1890 Bathurst rail collision =

1890 train collision in Bathurst, Australia

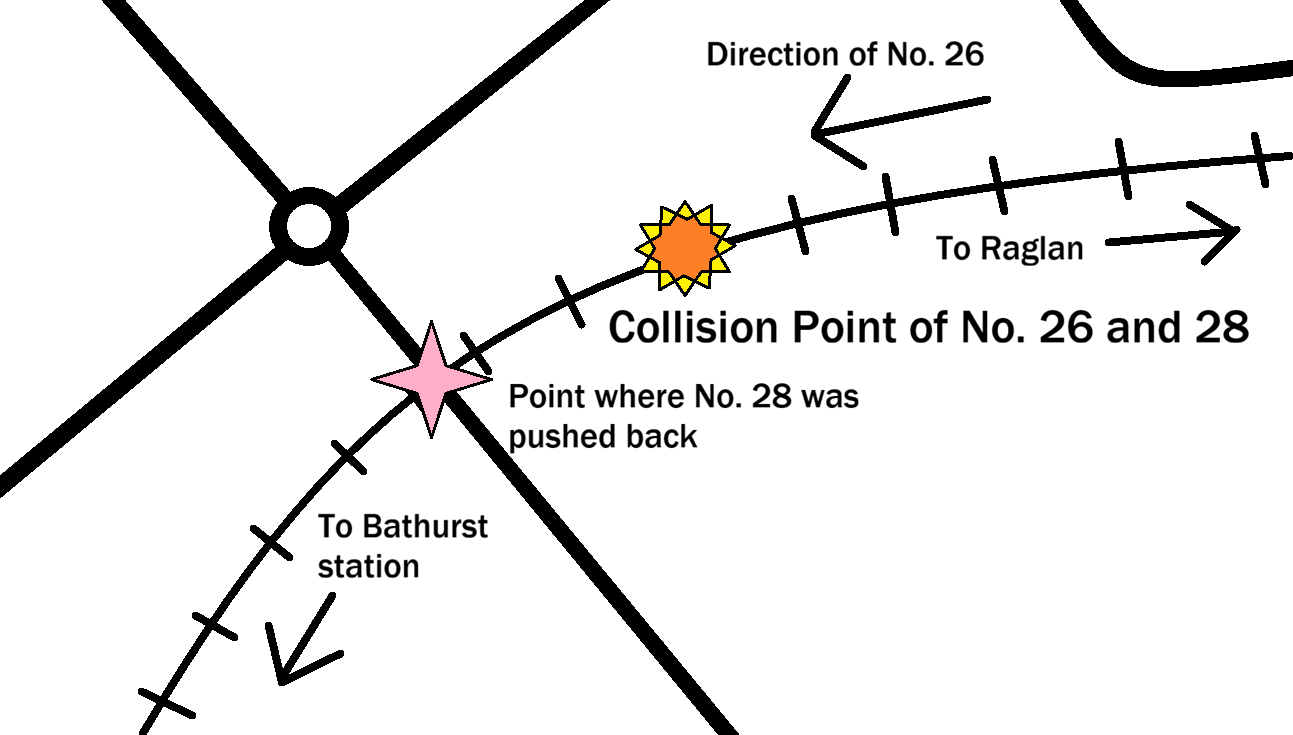
- Diagram of the accident

Details
- Date: 25 April 1890 approx. 7:00 pm
- Location: Bathurst, New South Wales
- Coordinates: 33°25′25″S 149°35′9″E
- Country: Australia
- Incident type: Collision, runaway train and mechanical failure
- Cause: Faulty coupling system which led to carriages breaking off and colliding with following train

Statistics
- Trains: 2
- Vehicles: 2
- Deaths: 4
- Injured: 3

Between 6 and 7 pm AEST, on 25 April 1890, sixteen carriages of a mixed-use train detached from the leading carriages and rolled down a steep grade east of Bathurst, New South Wales, Australia. The runaway carriages then collided with the front of a following goods train at the Russell Street level crossing. Four passengers who were still in the rear carriages died as well as hundreds of sheep. Three others were injured in the collision.

== Pre-incident ==
On 25 April 1890, a sixteen-carriage mixed train led by a J131 class steam locomotive was scheduled to depart Bathurst for Sydney at 4:50 pm. However, it ran 50 minutes late and left at 5:40 pm. This mixed train consisted of passenger carriages, sheep trucks, an empty horse truck, a guard's van and several mail trucks. The service was designated Number 26.

== Departure ==
Number 26 departed Bathurst station at exactly 5:41 pm and continued heading east. The train arrived at Kelso at 5:46 pm, where four goods carriages were detached and replaced with eight new carriages, each filled with 100 sheep. Number 26 then left Kelso at 6:30 pm with nineteen carriages, being delayed by waiting for another goods train down the track.

After departing Kelso, the train climbed a very steep 1 in 50 or 2% gradient leading up to its next stop, Raglan station. Nothing unusual was reported during the climb.

At 6:23 pm, Number 26 had arrived at Raglan station, where the brake van came to a stop at the wooden columns that helped support the awning at the end of the platform.

== Coupling failure ==
Immediately after Number 26 stopped, the whole vehicle jerked as it halted, and the drawbar between cars three and four snapped. Due to the rebound after the sudden halt and lack of side couplings or side chains, it gave the now-detached sixteen carriages weighing 154 tonnes (152 long tons; 170 short tons) enough energy to begin moving back down the incline.

The guard, after failing the attempt to halt the runaway carriages using the brakes, had jumped out of his carriage to try and activate the sprag clutch on the wheels, but that again failed, and within a few seconds, the runaway carriages had begun rolling downwards at an alarming speed.

The three remaining carriages left at Raglan station were placed into a siding by the station master.

== Descent and collision ==
Immediately after the sixteen carriages had broken off, the guard sent telegraph messages to both Kelso and Bathurst stations warning of the runaway carriages. Because of the sheer weight of the sixteen carriages, they rapidly gained speed and were reportedly travelling at 96 kilometres per hour (60 mph) when they were last seen at Raglan.

At 6:30 pm in Bathurst, the station master dispatched goods train number 28, also led by a J131 class steam locomotive, moments before they received the telegraph message, but it was too late to stop Number 28. The runaway carriages of Number 26 passed by Kelso at an alarming speed of 128 kilometres per hour (80 mph).

Number 28 failed to move out of the way of Number 26 and crossed the Russel Street level crossing. The runaway carriages came into sight as the goods train was 70 yards (64 m) east of the crossing.

At approximately 7 pm, the rearmost carriage of Number 26 collided with the front of Number 28 at 128 kilometres per hour (80 mph), completely reducing the wooden carriages to splinters. Number 28 was pushed back a whole 70 yards (64 m) to the level crossing due to the immense impact. Number 28's steam engine exploded, and the sound was heard all across Bathurst.

Four people were instantly killed due to the impact and 300 of the 800 sheep were killed. The crew of the number 28 goods train escaped injured, but alive.

== Post-incident ==
After the collision, around 1,000 people took part in the three-hour cleanup operation, which included taking the injured and dead to the hospitals, and clearing the line for the upcoming 10:20 passenger train going to Sydney.

At 9 pm, a steam engine was hooked to all the remaining carriages of the runaway to be taken away.

=== Coronial inquiry ===
A coronial inquiry was announced following the incident in accordance with Section 51 of the 1868 Government Railways Act and was presented to the parliament on 14 May. Evidence from the station masters of Raglan and Kelso were taken as well as evidence from the train crew and eyewitnesses.

The inquiry board concluded that the cause of the accident was due to the breaking of the drawbar that connected the third and fourth carriages, which found to have fractured from the strain it underwent during the train's violent rebound at Raglan. It also found that if the side chains had been utilized, the incident would have been prevented.

=== Aftermath ===
After the incident, goods trains were fitted with automatic air brakes, which would automatically apply the brakes if a part of the train detached.

Raglan station was moved further east, where there was a gentler grade, as part of a request from the inquiry board.

== See also ==
- 2003 Melbourne runaway train — Involved a Comeng train rolling down a steep grade from Broadmeadows and crashing into a train at Spencer Street.
- 1976 Glenbrook collision — Involved a 46 class locomotive colliding with a broken-down PTC V set at Glenbrook.
- Railway accidents in New South Wales — List of accidents.
