= Raglan railway station, New South Wales =

Raglan railway station
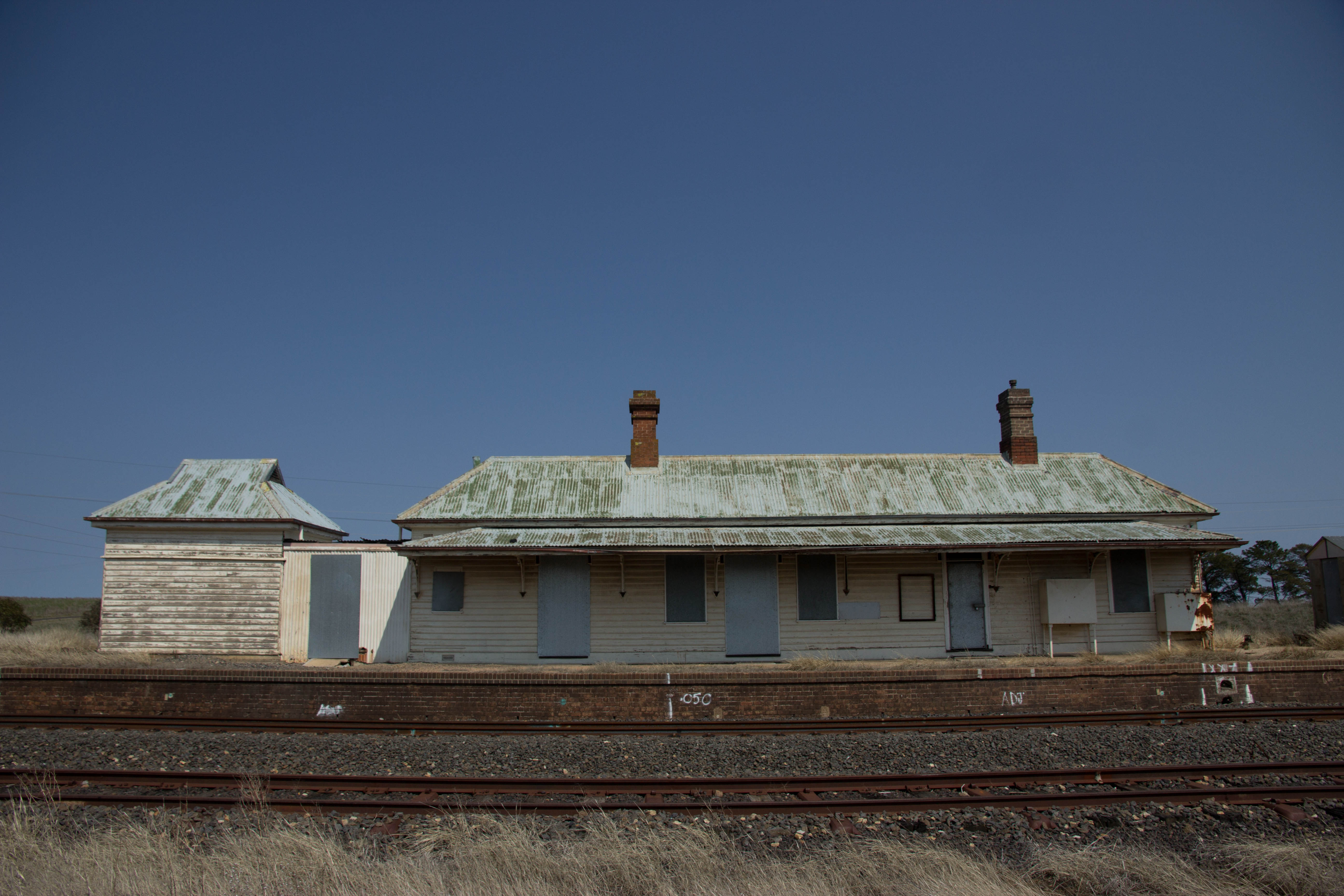
- The disused Raglan railway station, pictured in 2018.

- Location within New South Wales Location within Australia
- 33°26′00″S 149°39′05″E
- Location: Main Western railway, Raglan, Bathurst Region, New South Wales, Australia

Site notes
- Owner: Transport Asset Manager of New South Wales

New South Wales Heritage Register
- Official name: Raglan Railway Station group
- Type: State heritage (complex / group)
- Designated: 2 April 1999
- Reference no.: 1228
- Type: Railway Platform/Station
- Category: Transport – Rail

Raglan railway station is a heritage-listed disused railway station located on the Main Western railway at Raglan in the Bathurst Region local government area of New South Wales, Australia. The former station was added to the New South Wales State Heritage Register on 2 April 1999.

== History ==
The line to Raglan, then the terminus of the line, opened for passenger traffic on 4 March 1873 and for goods traffic on 4 August. The station was originally built on the top of a steep incline. Following a severe train crash in early 1890, which could have been prevented had there been runaway points at Raglan station, there were also calls to remove the station to more level ground.

The colonial government acted quickly after the inquiry into the accident, and the new station on a site on level ground opened on 20 October 1890. The current station dates from this time.

== Description ==
The station building is a type 9, non-standard timber building with brackets and a tin roof.

The station has an island platform made from brick.

== Heritage listing ==
Raglan is an interesting site as it is non-standard and built at a time when the railway administration was radically changing and the first use of standard buildings was being introduced. It is important illustrating the change of design and policy.

Raglan railway station was listed on the New South Wales State Heritage Register on 2 April 1999 having satisfied the following criteria.

The place possesses uncommon, rare or endangered aspects of the cultural or natural history of New South Wales.

This item is assessed as historically rare. This item is assessed as arch. rare. This item is assessed as socially rare.

== See also ==
- List of disused regional railway stations in New South Wales
