= Martin Merton =

Australian public transport mascot

Cover of the "There's no 'I' in Carriage" book

Martin M. Merton PhD is a fictional character that was created by Connex Melbourne in 2007 to increase the politeness and consideration of other passengers on the public transport system in Melbourne, Australia.

The campaign was criticised by some commuters, with many mX newspaper letter writers commenting that the money spent on this campaign could have been better spent elsewhere.

A book, There's no 'I' in Carriage, and a website were created (the website is no longer active); the title of the book is a parody of the saying "There's no 'I' in team". Both were intended to be humorous and were designed to imply lessons of passenger consideration rather than to state them directly.

The character of Martin Merton was portrayed by Jim Knobeloch.
