= Connex Melbourne =

Melbourne Australian train operator (1998–2009)

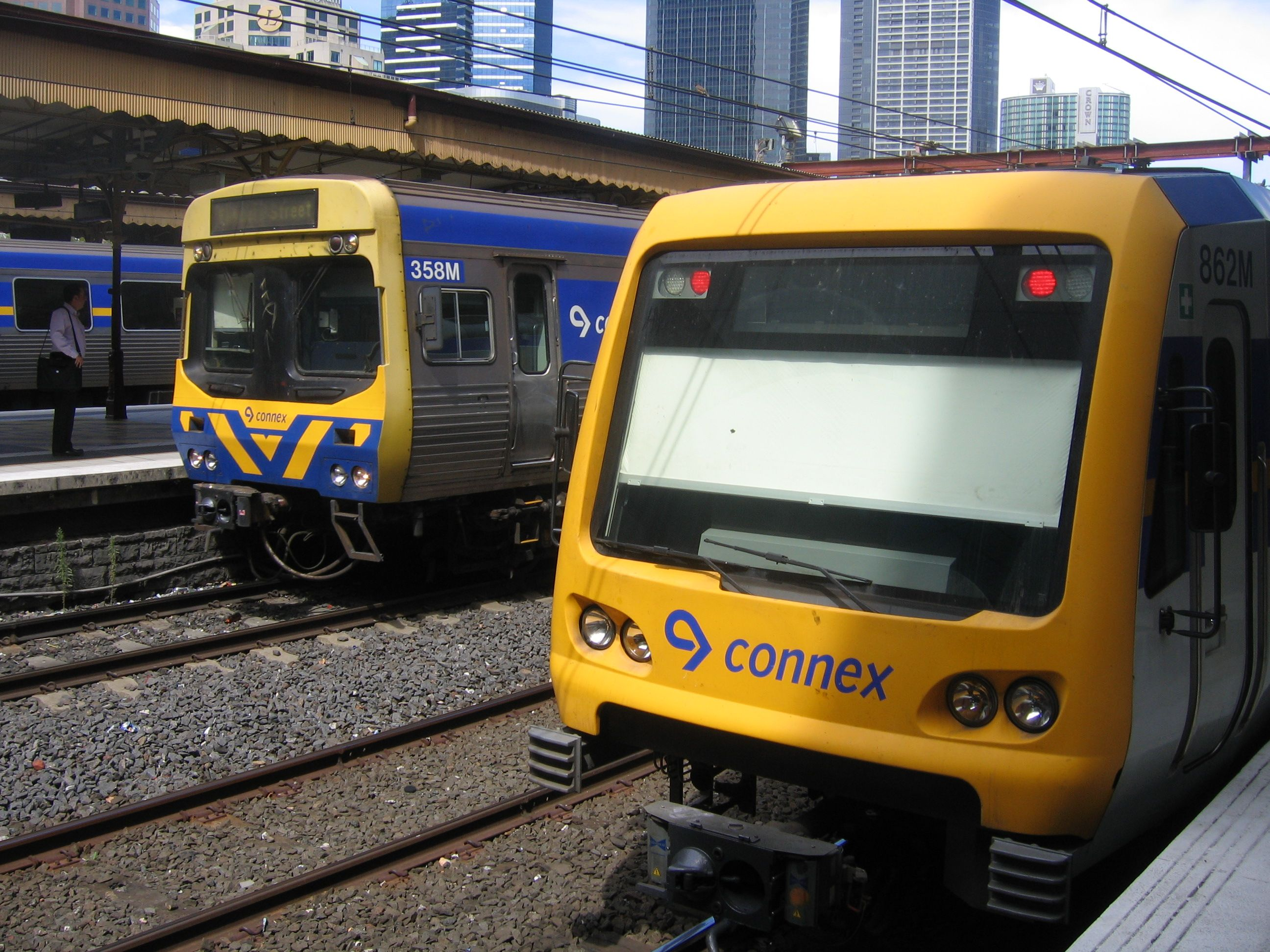
- Comeng and X'Trapolis trains at Flinders Street station, February 2009
- Industry: Public transport
- Predecessor: Public Transport Corporation, M>Train (Merged in 2004)
- Founded: 1 July 1998 (as Hillside Trains)
- Defunct: 29 November 2009
- Successor: Metro Trains Melbourne
- Headquarters: Melbourne, Australia
- Area served: Hillside Network
- Products: Train operator
- Net income: $22.5 million (2008/09)
- Number of employees: 2,501 (August 2009)
- Parent: Veolia Transport (formerly known as Connex, now Transdev Australia)
- Website: www.connexmelbourne.com.au

Connex Melbourne was a train operator in Melbourne, Australia. Formed in July 1998 as Hillside Trains, a business unit of the Public Transport Corporation, it was privatised in August 1999 becoming a subsidiary of Connex.

In April 2004, it became the sole operator of Melbourne suburban rail services, taking over the services of M>Train. When the franchise was re-tendered, it was awarded to Metro Trains Melbourne from November 2009.

== History ==
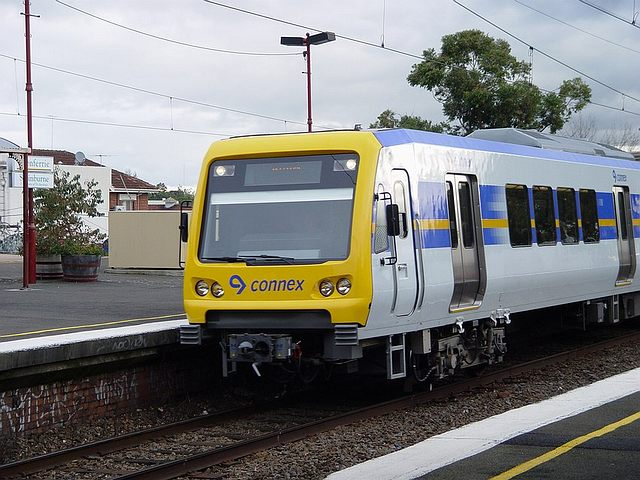
Connex train at Glenferrie railway station

In October 1997, in preparation for privatisation, it was announced the Public Transport Corporation's suburban rail operations would be split into two business units, Bayside Trains and Hillside Trains. PTC's tram operations was also split in preparation for privatisation. The Melbourne Transport Enterprises consortium, consisting of CGEA Transport Asia Pacific Holdings (CTAP) (a subsidiary of CGEA, later known as Connex), GEC Alsthom Australia Ltd (later known as Alstom) and Banque Nationale de Paris, was formed following the announcement to bid on PTC's rail and tram operations.

Hillside Trains, formed on 1 July 1998, took over operation of the Lilydale, Belgrave, Alamein, Glen Waverley, Epping (now Mernda) and Hurstbridge line services. Melbourne Transport Enterprises successfully bid to take over the Hillside Trains services from 29 August 1999 beating competition from GB Railways and National Express. As a partner of the consortium, Alstom would supply and deliver new trains, later known as X'Trapolis 100, to the Hillside Trains network. Alstom would also maintain the existing train fleet. Connex would be in charge of train operations, with Hillside Trains rebranded as Connex Melbourne in July 2000.

In December 2002, National Express withdrew from its operations in Victoria, and the State Government took control of the M>Train franchise. Early in 2003, the government began negotiations with Connex to assume responsibility for all Melbourne's metropolitan train network. An agreement was reached in February 2004 that awarded Connex the exclusive right to operate the entire metropolitan train network from 18 April 2004.

In August 2007, Connex's contract was extended until 29 November 2009. Veolia Transport was short listed to bid for the new franchise but lost to Metro Trains Melbourne and ceased operations on 29 November 2009.

As at August 2009, Connex Melbourne operated 15 train lines, 331 trains, 12,909 weekly services, and carried about 720,000 passengers each weekday. In 2008/09, 214 million passenger trips were made.

== Branding ==
After initially retaining the Hillside Trains name, in July 2000, the Connex Melbourne name was introduced. Following Veolia's rebranding of its transport operations from Connex to Veolia Transport on all other transport systems worldwide in late 2005 and early 2006, Connex Melbourne was one of the very few Veolia Transport operations^{a} to retain the Connex name. It was not until May 2008 that Connex Melbourne began to publicly acknowledge its connection with the parent company, using the "Connex: A Veolia Transport Company" phrase in publicity material and using the Veolia Transport and Connex brands together. Branding on staff uniforms, trains and station signage was not altered.

== Operations ==
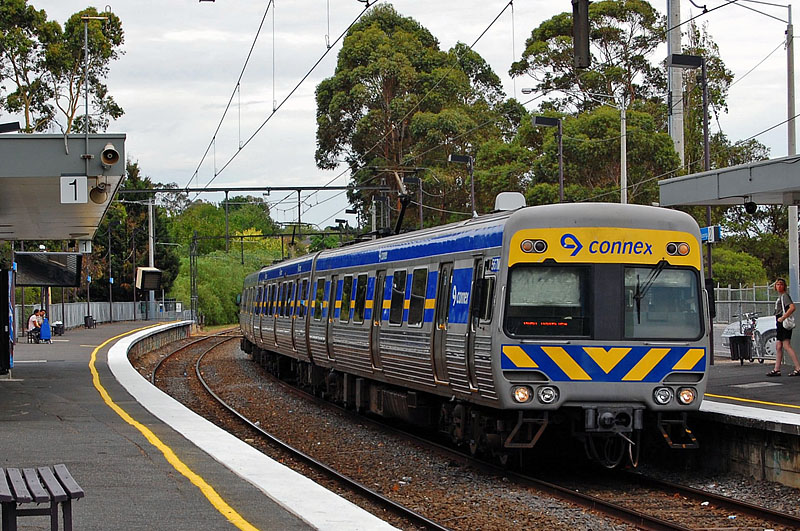
Connex liveried Comeng train at Tooronga in January 2007

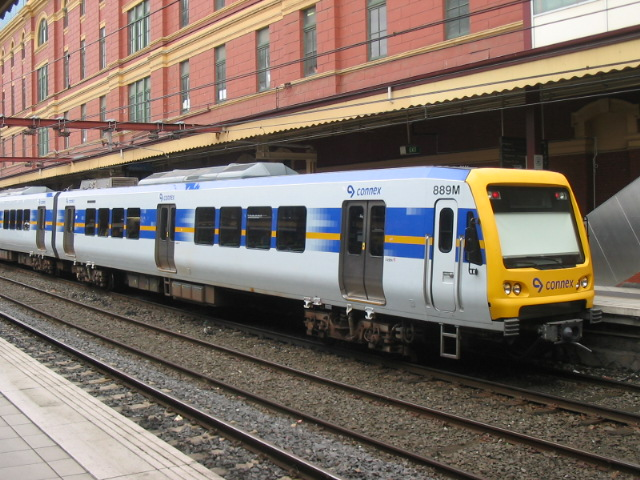
Connex X'Trapolis train at Flinders Street in December 2005

When the Public Transport Corporation fleet was split, Hillside Trains were allocated 58 three-car Hitachi and 91 three-car Comeng sets, as well as the single prototype 4-car 4D.

To replace the Hitachis, 58 three-car X'Trapolis were ordered with the first entering service in December 2002. The Comengs were refurbished between 2000 and 2003 by Alstom at Ballarat North Workshops.

When Connex Melbourne took over the M>Train franchise in April 2004, it took over all of its rolling stock including the remaining Hitachi and Comeng sets as well as the Siemens Nexas fleet. A class locomotives and MTH carriages were hired from V/Line for services on the unelectrified Stony Point line. These were replaced in April 2008 by Sprinters.

Because the modifications made by both operators had made the Comeng fleets incompatible with each other, Innovonics Limited modified the sets from both operators to enable them on the entire system again, along with a CCTV upgrade.

The majority of rolling stock was owned by the Victorian Government business enterprise VicTrack.

Maintenance of the Hitachi and Comeng sets was outsourced to United Group, while Siemens maintained the Siemens Nexas fleet. In October 2004, Alstom were contracted maintain the Hitachi, Comeng and X'Trapolis fleets. The maintenance contract was included in the sale of Alstom's Australian operations to United Group.

Connex was also responsible for the maintenance of the electrified metro network, which was contracted out to Mainco, a subsidiary of the United Group. The Department of Transport also had input into infrastructure related issues and major rail projects.

== 2009 heatwave issues ==
During January 2009, Melbourne experienced several days of extreme heat with temperatures in excess of 43 °C – the hottest heatwave since records were kept from the mid-1880s – with a maximum temperature reached of 45.1 °C (113.2 °F) in the Melbourne central business district. Prior to this, the ambient temperature was between 38 and 40 °C (100 and 104 °F). Connex was unable to guarantee services across the network. This was highly controversial as, in previous years, 'heatwaves' did not cause train cancellations. The heat-distortion of tracks has been attributed to the lack of expansion joints within newly replaced rail. Figures based on Connex media releases for the same period show the numbers of cancelled services exceeded one third of total services.

On 29 January 2009, over 500 services were cancelled. Next day services on eight lines were cancelled and the City Loop closed in the afternoon owing to the extreme weather (at the height of the heatwave) and knock-on effects, and the loss of power at the South Morang transmission station. By Connex's own estimates in the Melbourne media, over 750 services were cancelled out of 2,400. In response to the loss of services, the State Government made 30 January a day of free travel on trains, trams and buses.

== Government subsidy ==
Between 2004 and 2009, Connex Melbourne was paid an average of $345 million per annum by the Victorian government to operate the metro network. At the end of the 2004–2009 franchise agreement, Connex was paid well over $2 billion by the state government. In addition to the base contract payments, other payments from the state government to Connex included farebox, concession top-ups, maintenance, rollingstock adjustments, incentives and capital projects.

== Reliability benchmarks ==
Under the terms of its contract with the state government, Connex Melbourne was required to deliver on-time (no more than 59 seconds early, and no more than 4:59 minutes late, formerly 5:59 minutes) performance, system-wide, of no less than 92%. It was also required to deliver not less than 98% of scheduled train services, and significantly reduce any time spent by passengers waiting due to a delay, over a 1998 benchmark.

Fines for failure to meet service obligations were deducted from contract fees paid by the government to Connex. As of July 2006, the most recent fine imposed on Connex by the government was $5.1 million. Connex paid almost $70 million in penalty payments for poor performance over the life of the franchise. Connex released performance data on a monthly basis, usually put on view at railway stations. Fines and customer satisfaction levels are detailed in the quarterly 'Track Record' report released by the Department of Transport.

For every month that Connex failed to meet the performance benchmarks, a free daily Metcard was offered to holders of monthly or yearly tickets valid during that month. No compensation was offered to passengers using weekly, daily or other tickets.

== Marketing ==
Despite the formation of Metlink to deliver co-ordinated marketing initiatives across the entire Melbourne public transport network, Connex undertook its own marketing campaigns.

In July 2000, an advertising campaign featuring Harry Connick Jr publicised the name change from Hillside Trains to Connex. The campaign produced by Melbourne advertising agency Cummins & Partners played on the similar sound of Connex and Connick's name. A television commercial aired with Harry explaining; "I heard Hillside Trains was going to change its name and I was honoured to hear they were going to name it after me. Connicks. Well they could have consulted me on the spelling." Billboards on station platforms had Connick stating in a voice bubble; "Welcome to my train company – Connick's. That's OK, they'll fix the spelling..."

Television advertisements featuring Sheena Easton and a trainload of passengers singing her 1980 hit Morning Train (9 to 5) screened during April and May 2004.

Its most recent campaigns generally focused on commuter behaviour and etiquette. In mid-2005, Connex launched a print and TV advertising campaign featuring Humpty Dumpty and focusing on safety initiatives; the Don't Hold Others Back campaign of 2006 featured imagery of commuters struggling to board a train; and a 'train etiquette' campaign featuring fictitious character Martin Merton PhD, "the worlds No. 1 expert on train etiquette" offered advice to passengers on such topics as mobile phone use, flatulence and other low-level behavioural annoyances of train travel.

== Controversies ==
On 23 February 2007, a computer hacker broke into the gateway used by the SMS system and sent threatening messages to over 10,000 commuters who had subscribed to the service. A Connex spokesman said that the messages were clearly a hoax and the hackers were able only to send the message and could not get access to the customer database.

Melbourne artist Van Thanh Rudd made an artwork attacking Connex's parent company Veolia Environment's building of a light rail system in Jerusalem, including in East Jerusalem which is considered to be occupied by Israel.

== Rolling stock ==
Type	Image	Top Speed (km/h)	Built	Number	In Service	Notes
Hitachi		116	1972–1981	116 3 car sets	1972–2014	
Comeng		115	1981–1989	190 3 car sets	1981–present	
4D		130	1992	1 4-car set	1992–2002	Was a prototype unit, Retired in 2002, Scrapped in 2006
X'trapolis 100		143 (130 in service)	2002–2020	58 3 car sets	2002–present	
Siemens Nexas		147 (115 in service)	2002–2005	72 3 car sets	2003–present	

== Notes ==
a.One of the other operations to retain the Connex name is Connex Transport Jersey which operated MyBus until December 2012.

Preceded by Public Transport Corporation (as Hillside Trains)	Railways in Melbourne (Burnley & Clifton Hill groups); 1997–2009	Succeeded by Metro Trains Melbourne
Preceded by M>Train	(Caulfield & Northern groups); 2004–2009	Succeeded by Metro Trains Melbourne
