= M-Train =

Former railway operator in Melbourne, Australia

M>Train (Bayside Trains)

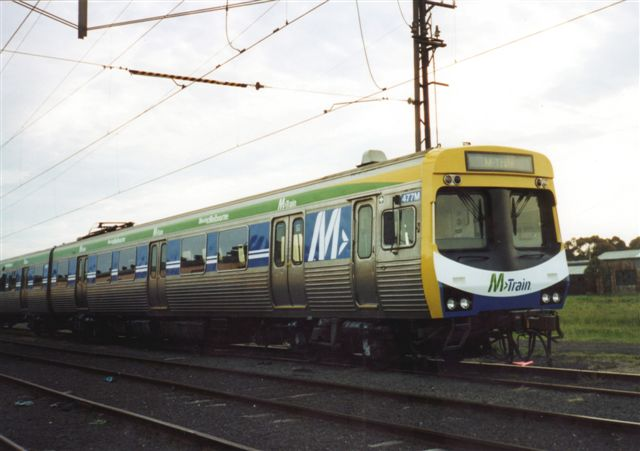
- Comeng after refurbishment by EDi Rail in October 2002
- Formerly: Bayside Trains
- Industry: Railway operator
- Predecessor: Public Transport Corporation
- Founded: 1 July 1998
- Defunct: 18 April 2004
- Successor: Connex Melbourne
- Headquarters: Melbourne
- Area served: Melbourne
- Parent: National Express Group
- Website: mtrain.com.au

M>Train (pronounced as "M train") was a train operator in Melbourne, Australia, which operated roughly half of the city's suburban rail operations. Formed in July 1998 as Bayside Trains, a business unit of the Public Transport Corporation, it was privatised in August 1999 and became a subsidiary of National Express as one of the two operators of the suburban rail network, the other being Connex Melbourne.

In December 2002, National Express handed the franchise in, with the Victorian state government taking over until negotiations were concluded for Connex Melbourne to take over in April 2004.

== History ==
In October 1997, in preparation for privatisation, it was announced that the Public Transport Corporation's suburban rail operations were split into two business units, Bayside Trains and Hillside Trains. On 1 July 1998, the former took over operation of the Frankston, Cranbourne, Pakenham, Sandringham, Williamstown, Werribee, St Albans (now Sunbury), Broadmeadows (now Craigieburn) and Upfield line services.

Bayside Trains initially operated service on the Orbost line as far as Warragul under contract to V/Line until electric services ceased beyond Pakenham. On 1 July 1998, operation of the Stony Point line was transferred from V/Line.

National Express successfully bid to take over the Bayside Trains services from 29 August 1999 beating competition from Connex, GB Railways and a Singapore MRT led consortium. National Express were also awarded the Swanston Trams franchise and V/Line concession.

In October 2000, National Express rebranded Bayside Trains as M>Train.

In December 2002, National Express handed in its Victorian rail and tram franchises having been unable to renegotiate financial terms with the State Government who took over operations.

KPMG were appointed to operate the business on behalf of the State Government. In May 2003, the State Government announced it would establish a single company to operate both networks, and was negotiating with Connex Melbourne (who operated the other half of the network) to operate this entity. In February 2004, an agreement was reached, and the networks were reunited on 18 April 2004.

== Operations ==
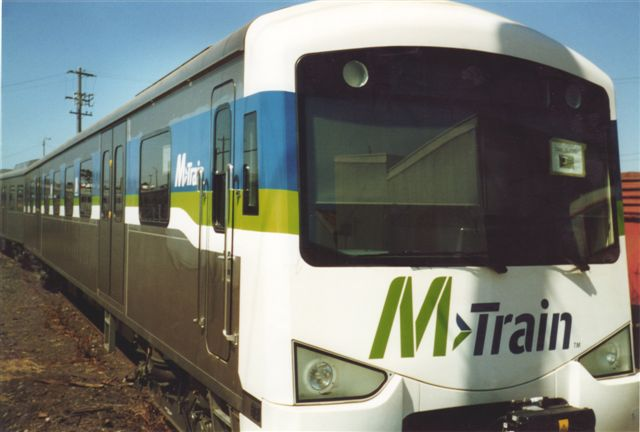
Siemens Nexas in a trial M>Train livery

M>Train operated the suburban rail services in the western, north-western, south-eastern, and southern suburbs running through North Melbourne and South Yarra stations. These were the Werribee, Williamstown, Sydenham (now Sunbury), Broadmeadows (now Craigieburn), Upfield, Pakenham, Cranbourne, Frankston, Sandringham and Stony Point lines, in addition to maintaining the three underground City Loop stations.

When the Public Transport Corporation fleet was split, Bayside Trains were allocated 58 three-car Hitachi and 97 three-car Comeng sets. A class locomotives and MTH carriages were hired from V/Line for services on the unelectrified Stony Point line.

To replace the Hitachis, 62 three-car Siemens Nexas were ordered.

Until November 2003, M>Train also issued its own annual railway tickets, running in parallel and sold at a discount to those Metcard system, but only permitting travel on their half of the network.

== Rolling stock ==
Electric Trains
Type	Image	Top Speed (km/h)	Built	Number	In Service	Notes
Hitachi		116	1972–1981	58 3-car sets	1972–2014	
Comeng		115	1981–1989	97 3-car sets	1981–present	
Siemens Nexas		147 (115 in service)	2002–2005	62 3-car sets	2003–present	

Locomotives and Carriages
Type	Image	Top Speed (km/h)	Built	Number	In Service	Notes
A Class		133 (95 on line)	1984–1985	1	1998–2008	Were used on the Stony Point Line, leased from V/Line, Retired from Stony Point line in 2008 and were replaced by Sprinters
MTH sets		115 (95 on line)	1984	2 or 3	1984–2008	Were mostly used on the Stony Point Line, leased from V/Line, Retired from service in 2008 and were Replaced By Sprinters

Preceded by Public Transport Corporation	Railways in Melbourne; Caulfield & Northern groups 1999–2002	Succeeded by State Government then Connex Melbourne
