= New South Wales Z28 class locomotive =

Class of Australian 2-6-0 locomotives

New South Wales Z28 class
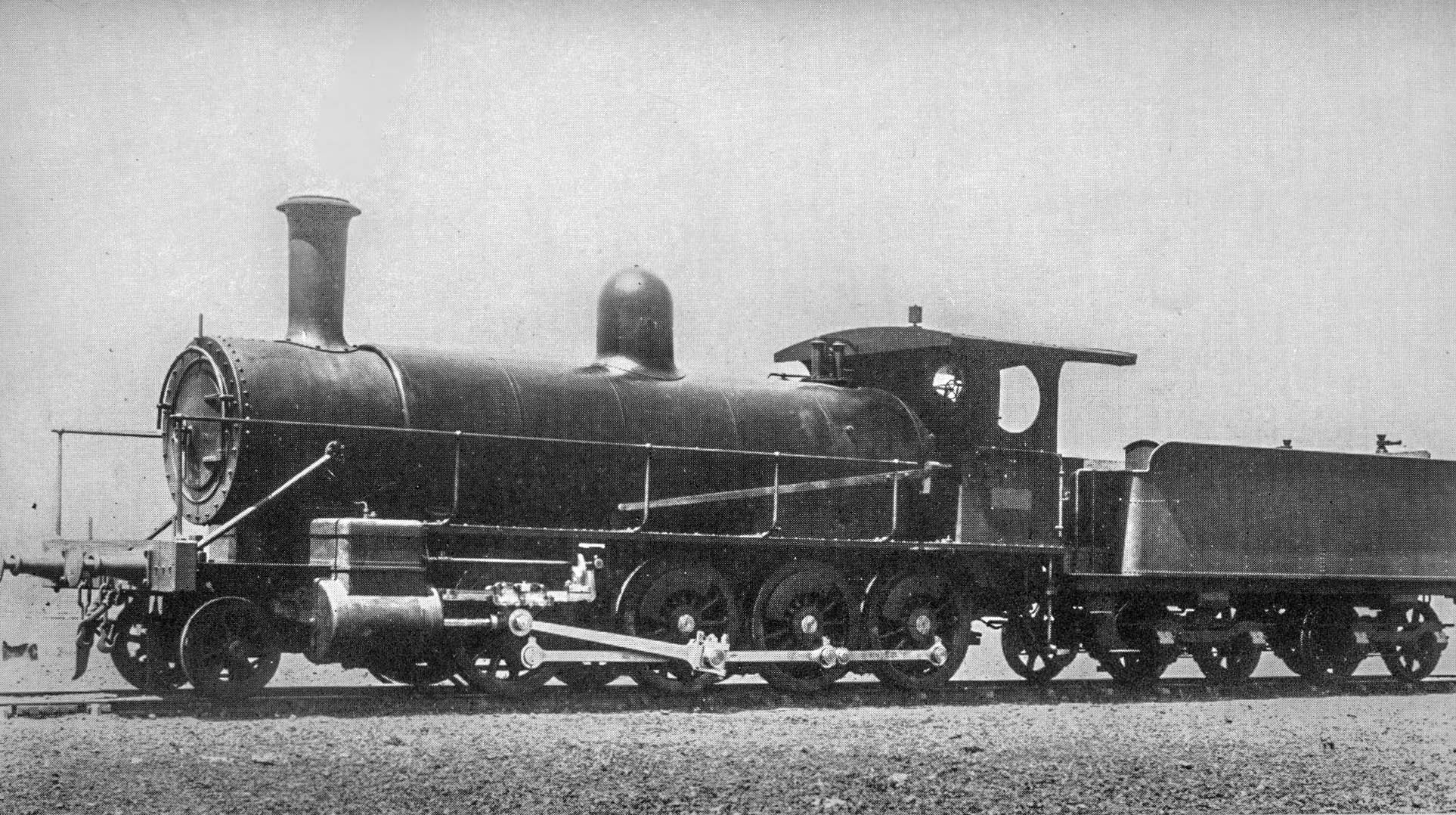
- J.522 (Z28) 'Native Bears'
Type and origin
- Power type: Steam
- Builder: Eveleigh Railway Workshops
- Total produced: 4
Specifications
- Configuration
  - Whyte: 2-8-0
- Gauge: 4 ft 8 1/2 in (1,435 mm) standard gauge

The Z28 class locomotive was an amalgamation of two classes; the Baldwin J.131 class, and the Eveleigh J.522 class. The Baldwin J.131 class was first delivered in 1887, and the locally made J.522 class was delivered in 1893.

== Accidents ==
On 25 April 1890, a J.131 locomotive was damaged after it was hit by a runaway train in the Bathurst collision.

== Gallery ==
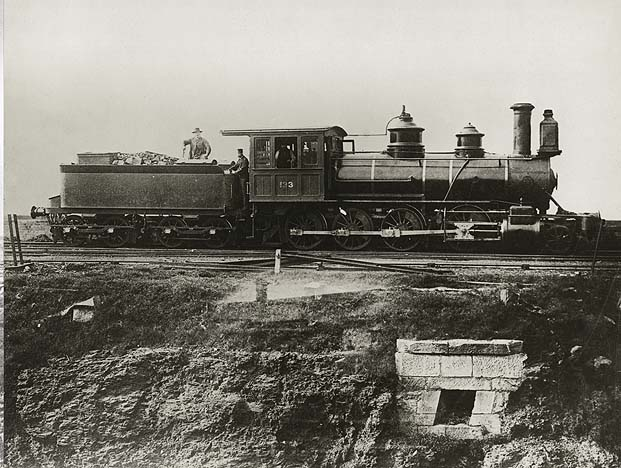
Class Z2802 (J131) locomotive

== See also ==
- NSWGR steam locomotive classification
