= Comeng (train) =

Electric multiple unit operating on the Melbourne rail network

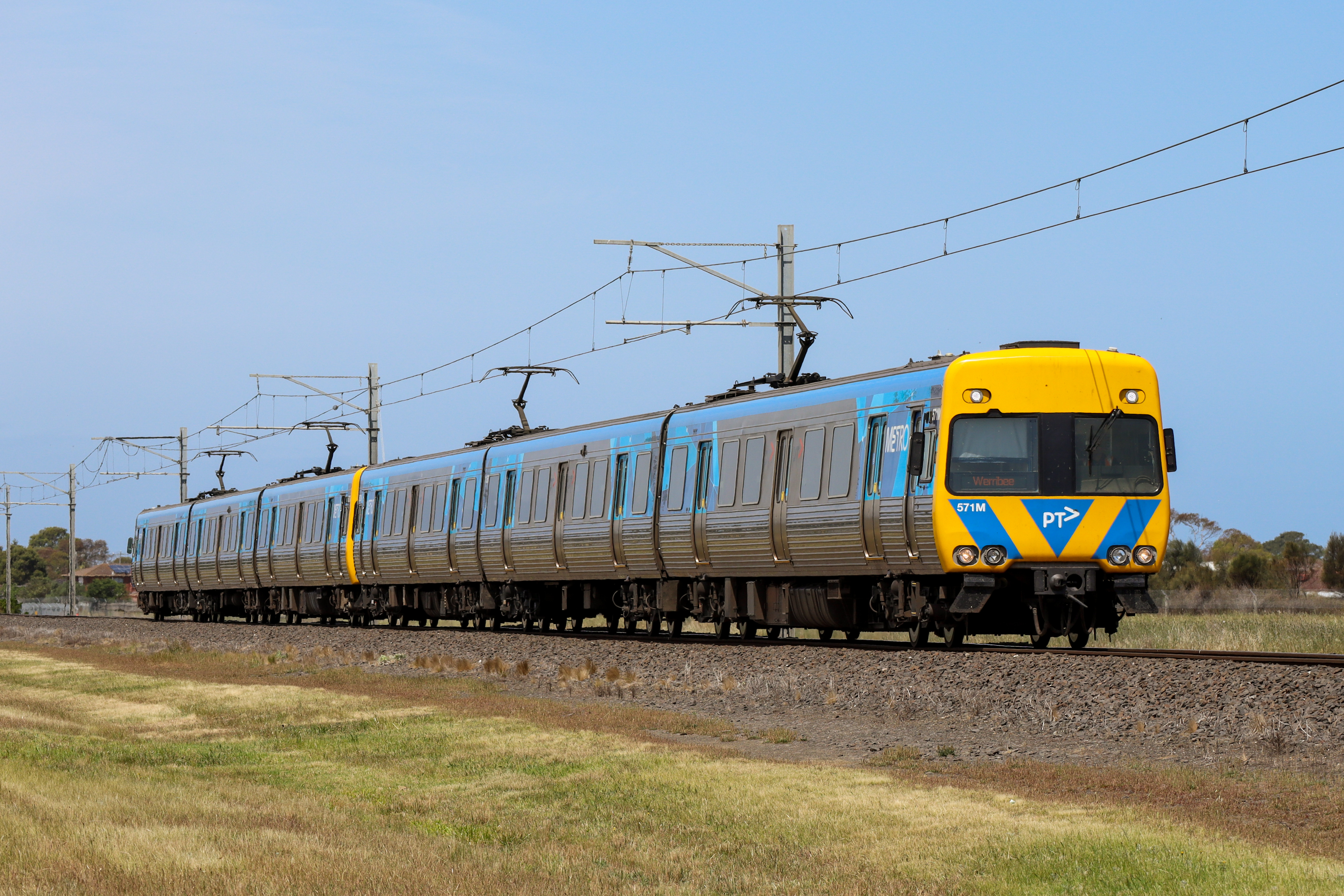
- Alstom-refurbished Comeng 571M on a Werribee-bound service near Westona station, November 2023

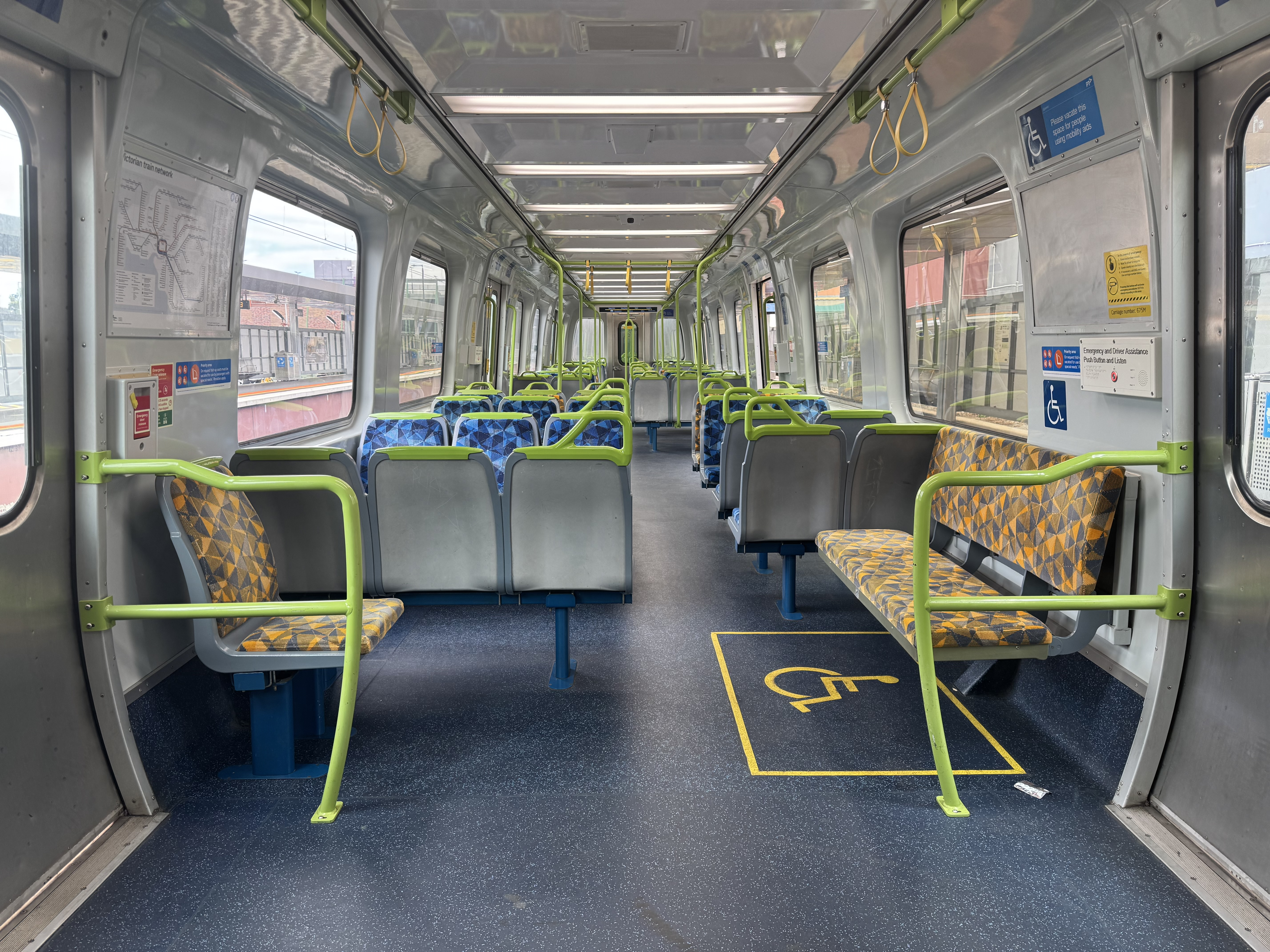
- Interior of an Alstom-refurbished Comeng with life extension upgrades
- Stock type: Electric Multiple Unit
- In service: 28 September 1981 – present
- Manufacturer: Commonwealth Engineering
- Built at: Dandenong, Victoria
- Replaced: Tait; Harris
- Constructed: 1981–1988
- Refurbished: Alstom & EDi Rail (2000–2003); UGL Rail (2017–2021)
- Scrapped: 2021–present
- Number built: 570 carriages (190 sets)
- Number in service: 288 carriages (96 sets)
- Number scrapped: 265 carriages
- Successor: High Capacity Metro Train; X'Trapolis 2.0
- Formation: 3-car sets (M–T–M)
- Fleet numbers: 301M–468M, 471M–554M, 561M–680M, 691M–698M; 1001T–1084T, 1086T–1127T, 1131T–1190T, 1196T–1199T
- Capacity: 210 seated, 765 crush load per 3-car unit
- Operators: Metro Trains Melbourne (2009–present) Previous: VicRail (1981–1983); The Met/MTA (1983–1989); The Met/PTC (1989–1999); M>Train (1999–2004); Connex (1999–2009)
- Depots: Craigieburn; Kananook; Newport
- Lines served: Craigieburn Upfield; Frankston; Sandringham Werribee Williamstown; Flemington Racecourse

Specifications
- Car body construction: Stainless steel
- Train length: 71.2 m (233 ft 7 1/8 in)
- Car length: 24 m (78 ft 8 7/8 in) (motor carriages); 23.2 m (76 ft 1 3/8 in) (trailer carriages)
- Width: 3.05 m (10 ft 1/16 in)
- Height: 3,835 mm (12 ft 7 in)
- Doors: 3 per side
- Maximum speed: 115 km/h (71 mph)
- Weight: 141 t (139 long tons; 155 short tons) (max)
- Traction system: Resistance control (301M–468M, 471M–554M, 561M–680M); Chopper control (691M–698M)
- Traction motors: 8 × GEC G317AZ 124 kW (166 hp) (continuous) series-wound DC motor
- Power output: 992 kW (1,330 hp) (continuous)
- Acceleration: 0.8 m/s^{2} (2.6 ft/s^{2})
- Deceleration: 0.85 m/s^{2} (2.8 ft/s^{2}) (service); 0.95 m/s^{2} (3.1 ft/s^{2}) (emergency)
- Electric systems: 1,500 V DC (nominal) from overhead catenary
- Current collection: Pantograph
- UIC classification: Bo′Bo′+2′2′+Bo′Bo′
- Bogies: Bradford Kendall B.K.12390 (tread brake, motor cars); Bradford Kendall B.K.12391 (tread brake, trailer cars); Linke-Hofmann-Busch (disc brake); Alstom (disc brake replacement)
- Braking systems: Electro-pneumatic and rheostatic: Westinghouse Westcode tread brakes (first order); Knorr-Bremse disc brakes (second order)
- Coupling system: Scharfenberg
- Track gauge: 1,600 mm (5 ft 3 in) broad gauge

The Comeng (/ˈkɒmɛndʒ/ KOM-enj) is a class of electric multiple unit (EMU) operating on the suburban railway network of Melbourne. Built by their namesake Commonwealth Engineering (abbreviated as Comeng), the trains were introduced in 1981 as a replacement for the Tait and Harris trains. In total, 190 three-car trainsets were built, although 96 three-car sets remain in service and are expected to be retired by 2032.

The fleet underwent two major refurbishments. The first, a mid-life refurbishment, was carried out from 2000 to 2003 by Alstom and EDi Rail. The second, named the Comeng Life Extension Project, completed between 2017 and 2021, aimed to extend the trains' lifespan to at the very least meet their successors entry to service High Capacity Metro Trains and the X'Trapolis 2.0 trains. Alongside these upgrades, a number of minor improvement programs were also conducted on the trains to further enhance their efficiency, safety, and reliability.

With the withdrawal of the Hitachi trains in 2014, the Comeng trains are currently the oldest active in the Melbourne suburban fleet.

== Description ==
Comeng trains are single deck and are semi-permanently coupled as M-T-M (motor-trailer-motor) sets. Most frequently, they are coupled as M-T-M-M-T-M (six-car) sets. Comeng trains have power operated doors that must be pulled open manually by hand but are closed by the driver. The trains were the first suburban trains in Melbourne to have air-conditioning in the passenger saloon. (The older Hitachi trains had driver only air-conditioning fitted more recently.) The design of Melbourne's Comeng trains is closely related to that of Adelaide Metro's diesel-electric 3000 class railcars.

They operate in larger numbers on the Northern, Cross City and Frankston group lines. Since 2017, the Comeng trains have discontinued regular operations on the Burnley and Clifton Hill group lines which are now served exclusively by newer X'Trapolis 100 trains most of the time. The Comeng trains had previously served on the Cranbourne and Pakenham lines until December 2022 and the Sunbury line until February 2026. Since then, the Cranbourne, Pakenham and Sunbury lines were replaced and exclusively served by the High Capacity Metro Trains due to the opening of the Metro Tunnel. As of 10 March 2026, those lines are now operated exclusively by High Capacity Metro Trains.

The Comeng fleet has begun retirement, with many sets being transferred to North Shore and Tottenham to be stored. The stored sets eventually being transferred to Laverton, North Bendigo or McIntyre for scrapping. The fleet will eventually be replaced by the High Capacity Metro Trains (HCMT) and X'Trapolis 2.0 fleet.

== History ==
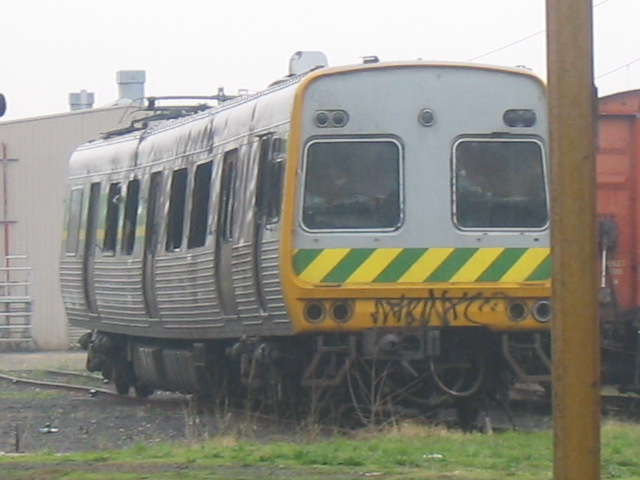
A now-scrapped unrefurbished Comeng carriage in its original Metropolitan Transit Authority livery

In late 1977 the Victorian Railways, trading as VicRail, called tenders for 300 new suburban carriages to operate on the Melbourne metropolitan network, arranged as 100 sets of motor-trailer-motor sets, forming the largest passenger rolling stock contract called for an Australian railway at the time. The intent was to replace the remaining timber-bodied Tait and a significant proportion of the Harris sets, particularly in the lead up to the opening of Melbourne's City Loop. The Dandenong factory employed about 450 people during the contract.

=== Design ===
Experience with the previous Hitachi sets had shown their electrical equipment was reliable, but the combination of a stainless steel car-body combined with a carbon steel framework had caused serious corrosion issues, so an all-stainless steel design was preferred. This placed Commonwealth Engineering, and their Dandenong rolling stock factory, in a prime position to tender, as they held the Australian license for the Budd Company's stainless steel rolling stock construction techniques. Comeng submitted their tender on 10 April 1978, and the contract was awarded in April 1979.

The original carriage design used a stainless steel structure with glass-reinforced plastic (GRP) trimmings, but manufacturing constraints resulted in a whole front panel for each motor car being made with the GRP material, hiding the stainless steel structure.

A full-size, half-length mock-up of a Comeng motor car was constructed at the Dandenong factory to help VicRail staff visualise the final concept. Photos of the mock-up show a dark blue outline around the front of the carriage, stretching down to a pilot just above the rails, and fittings on the exposed stainless steel motor car front including the final marker lights, but also a taildisc on the centre pillar and a destination disc below the driver's window. This design originally included luggage racks above the windows, but these were not provided in the final model. The window surrounds were also GRP, and the internal ceilings were formed with pressed aluminium sheets with recesses for light fittings, derived from a previous Comeng contract for the Hong Kong MTA.

The underframes followed the normal Budd/Comeng technique of 350-grade carbon steel end units, combined with stainless steel side sills and transoms, but with Corten-steel corrugated floor sheets spot-welded to the underframe structure along the whole length of each carriage. This was necessary to achieve VicRail's stated requirement for end-loading strength, which was specified at three times that of the existing rolling stock. The first body shell was railed from Dandenong to Comeng's Granville plant for testing, and passed all tests.

Electrical systems were all centralised to a common control panel, rather than being located with each piece of equipment spread around the carriage underframes.

From a passenger comfort perspective, the carriage design was the extremely large window panes. Previously, all suburban air conditioned rolling stock in Australia had been designed as carriages first, and then handed to air conditioning manufacturers to design and provide the necessary equipment to achieve specified climate control requirements. The Comeng design flipped that script, instead bringing the air conditioning manufacturers onboard much earlier and this allowed a design with a lower profile, avoiding significant projection above the carriage roofs. The air conditioning units were designed to be lowered onto the carbody, automatically connecting to the air ducts and with only a single electrical connection, isolated from the drainage system. This design principle allowed the modules to be exchanged in as little as ten minutes.

Cast-steel bogies were provided by Bradford-Kendall, which led to some internal political issues between them, Comeng, and Australian National Industries.

An unusual but useful feature of the trains was a switch provided in the guard's compartment, which would enable single car operation. When in use, this system would switch off the lights and lock the doors of the leading and middle carriage, leaving only the trailing carriage for passenger use under observation of the guard. This feature was rendered obsolete when two-person crews were abolished on the Melbourne suburban system, and abandoned when the early 2000s refurbishments of the Comeng fleet introduced inter-carriage walkways.

=== Construction and delivery ===
Stainless steel sheets were seam-welded together, then placed in jigs and rolled to shape to form the carriage bodies, while underframes were inverted for equipment and piping attachment then flipped and mated to the car shells before final fit-out.

A limited 1,500V power supply was provided at the Comeng factory to allow testing of the trains' internal systems before leaving the compound, then as each set of carriages was completed they were tested on a short siding parallel to what is now the Cranbourne railway line, running south-east from the Comeng factory.

=== Entry to service ===
The first Comeng set, 301M-1001T-302M, entered service on 28 September 1981. By the middle of 1984, 76 sets had been delivered, and some of the older trains, including the last of the Tait rolling stock, had begun to be phased out. Following the operational problems and subsequent failed refurbishment of the Harris fleet, the initial order was increased from 100 to 190 3-car sets, with the aim of completely replacing both the Tait and Harris sets by 1988.

The first sets experienced issues with the GEC traction equipment that had originally been suggested by VicRail, as it had proven successful in Ireland and Hong Kong but was not suited to Melbourne's climate, including higher ambient temperatures and dust issues, particularly affecting the camshafts. These issues were magnified by late component delivery from GEC's factory in England, and discussions between the Comeng team and GEC's chairman led to some sets of equipment being airfreighted over to Dandenong to avoid production line delays.

Electric train drivers were rostered and trained en-masse for use of the new trains, which led to some drivers being taught how to operate the new equipment but then not using that knowledge for months; to overcome the issue Comeng provided electricians in the driving cabins to remind the train drivers how to operate the new equipment.

Set 381M-1041T-382M was the first delivered in the Metropolitan Transit green and yellow scheme, though the sets including 27T and 28T had been repainted (with those cars renumbered 1027T and 1028T respectively) before then. Notably, when the 41st set was delivered the front panels of the motor carriages were grey or silver-framed rather than the earlier orange or later yellow.

Due to the ongoing issues with GEC's traction equipment, set 469M-1085T-470M was fitted with AEG camshaft control equipment instead. It performed admirably but due to no further decisions being made, it remained an orphan set.

In parallel with the development of the Comeng fleet, a separate contract had been won by Comeng in early 1981 to refurbish the Harris fleet. This project ended up being more costly and less successful than originally anticipated, and Comeng and the Railways eventually agreed to terminate that project with the fourth four-carriage set and use those resources to extend the new train contract in lieu. The contract extension signed in late 1982 for the Comeng trains saw the total number increase from 100 to 190 three-car trains. The additional trains provided an opportunity for Comeng to introduce a new fabricated bolsterless type of bogie, manufactured by Salzgitter in Germany to the design of Linke-Hoffman Busch (LHB), and fitted with Chopper equipment, which overcame the weight issues of the cast steel Bradford-Kendall bogies and the electrical issues with the GEC traction equipment, while also allowing recycling of the Mitsubishi traction gear originally intended for the Refurbished Harris train project. The new bogies also use Knorr disc brakes rather than traditional tread brakes. The first batch of bogies were provided from Germany, with the balance of manufacturing work split between Comeng and the Railways' Newport Workshops. The disc brake equipment was tested on set 433M-1067T-434M-435M-1068T-436M in the workshops, before that set was converted to the normal configuration on release to VicRail.

As of 15 July 1985, all sets in service except 321M-11T-322M, 317M-9T-318M, and 339M-20T-340M, were converted from the orange livery to the green livery.

The 45th set delivered had custom decals applied to the sides celebrating the halfway point through the order. On the side (above each door) was the quote "45th Super Train from The Met", and the sides also displayed the number 45 in large Numerals below the windows. This was found on two sets, 477M-1089T-478M and 479M-1090T-480M. These had been removed by 1 February 1991. 477M-1089T-478M still remains in service, but 479M-1090T-480M was stored at North Shore before being scrapped in early 2022.

The July 1987 MetRail working timetable listed 221 tread-brake, 76 disc brake and 2 tread/chopper motor cars in service, along with 112 tread brake and 38 disc brake trailers. Notably, 1196T, the trailer car in the chopper set between 691M-692M, was grouped with the rest of the tread brake cars. This indicates that it was identical to the other trailers, with the chopper modifications only applying to 691M-692M and the trailer car renumbering only having been applied for convenience.

The final Comeng set to enter service was 697M-1199T-698M, being delivered on 2 June 1989 and entering service on 24 July 1989.

=== Refurbishment ===
2000–2003

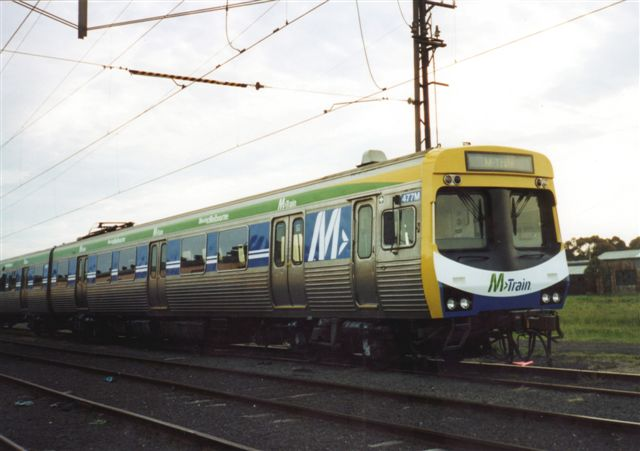
An M>Train liveried Comeng 477M as delivered after refurbishment by EDi Rail. The brand went defunct in 2004, leaving Connex to take over all Comeng operations.

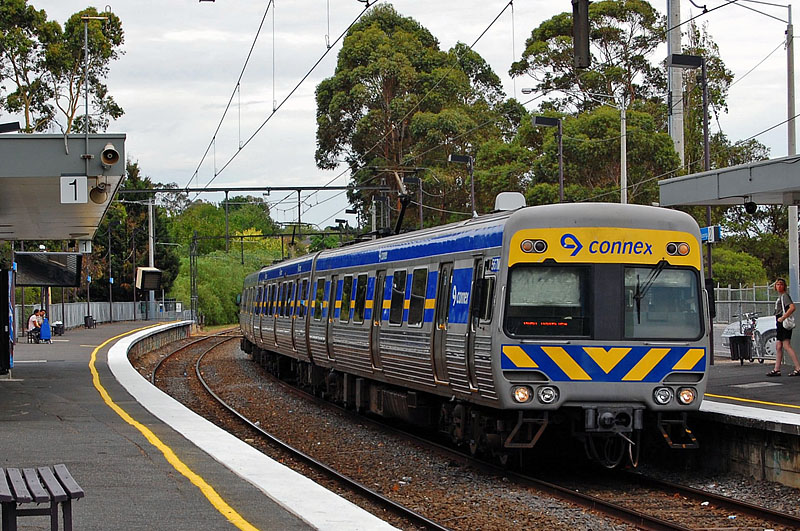
A Connex liveried Comeng set, likely 568M-1134T-567M, as refurbished by Alstom between 2000 and 2003, arrives into Tooronga station.

Between 2000 and 2003, the two train operators at the time, Connex and M>Train, had Alstom and EDi Rail respectively refurbish the trains.

The Alstom and EDi Rail sets have a number of differences, including:

- Interior arrangement – The interior LED displays on the M>Train trains were in the middle, as opposed to being at both ends of the carriage on Connex sets.
- Upholstery – Seats in M>Train trains were given a blue texture, while Connex opted for rainbow-textured seats, with scattered letters spelling out "Connex".
- Seating arrangement – Both operators designed their carriages different seating layouts.
- Exterior front panels – Information on the train's terminus is displayed on top of the window on M>Train fleets, while Connex trains have them displaying on the right window (in pre-refurbishment style).
- Cab layout – The EDI Rail refurbished trains retained a second full-size seat on the right-hand side of the cab, originally used for the guard, whereas the Alstom sets only have a small seat, the same size as the passenger ones.
- Cab fittings – The EDi Rail trains also have a windscreen-wiper on both sides, the Alstom sets only having one on the driver's side.
- Light fittings – The Alstom refurbished trains have grated light coverings, while the EDi type retained the original flat coverings.
- And Early on the electric systems were incompatible between the 2 types, thus they could never run coupled. But then in the later years they were modified to be able to run together.

Former horn of an EDI refurbished Comeng, a Roy Victor Butler (RVB) 3 Chime Horn. This was replaced with the newer Zöllner Makrofon 370 in late March 2024

Both sets had CCTV and emergency assistance panels introduced and installed as part of the refurbishment program.

After Connex assumed responsibility for all of Melbourne's suburban train network in 2004, the EDI refurbished trains (from M>Train) had the M>Train exterior logos removed with a new Connex logo in its place alongside a repainted front panel. The trains also later received Connex blue and yellow side stripes, new seat fabric with the Connex branding.

=== Concorde program ===
2006–2007

From December 2006 both fleets were allowed to run system wide. The electronics of both Comeng types were altered to make them electronically compatible with each other, with both the PID voices and display formatting altered. Both types of Comeng can run system wide and can run in multiple unit with trains of the same or different type.

=== Interior rearrangements ===
2009

From the beginning of March 2009, Connex ran a test set of carriages with new seating arrangement on city lines. The new arrangements removed 44 seats, making room for more standing on the train. The changes were made to accommodate the increased patronage on the Melbourne rail network.

=== Door upgrades ===
2014–2015

Comeng trains require passengers to manually open saloon doors to enter and exit the trains. Pneumatic air pressure keeps the doors closed whilst the trains are in motion, and is released by the driver when the carriages stop at station platforms. Prior to 2014, the doors were fitted with large "door knob" style handles. These made it relatively easy for unruly passengers to force the doors open, including while the train was in motion. All carriages were retrofitted with a new flat slim handle designed to make doors more difficult to force open. This followed an incident at Watergardens railway station where teenagers forced open a door on a moving train and one jumped out, injuring himself. Alan Osbourne, then director of Transport Safety Victoria (TSV), informed Metro that the Comeng trains would be taken out of service if their doors were not made impossible to force open by 2017.

=== Life extension ===
2017–2021

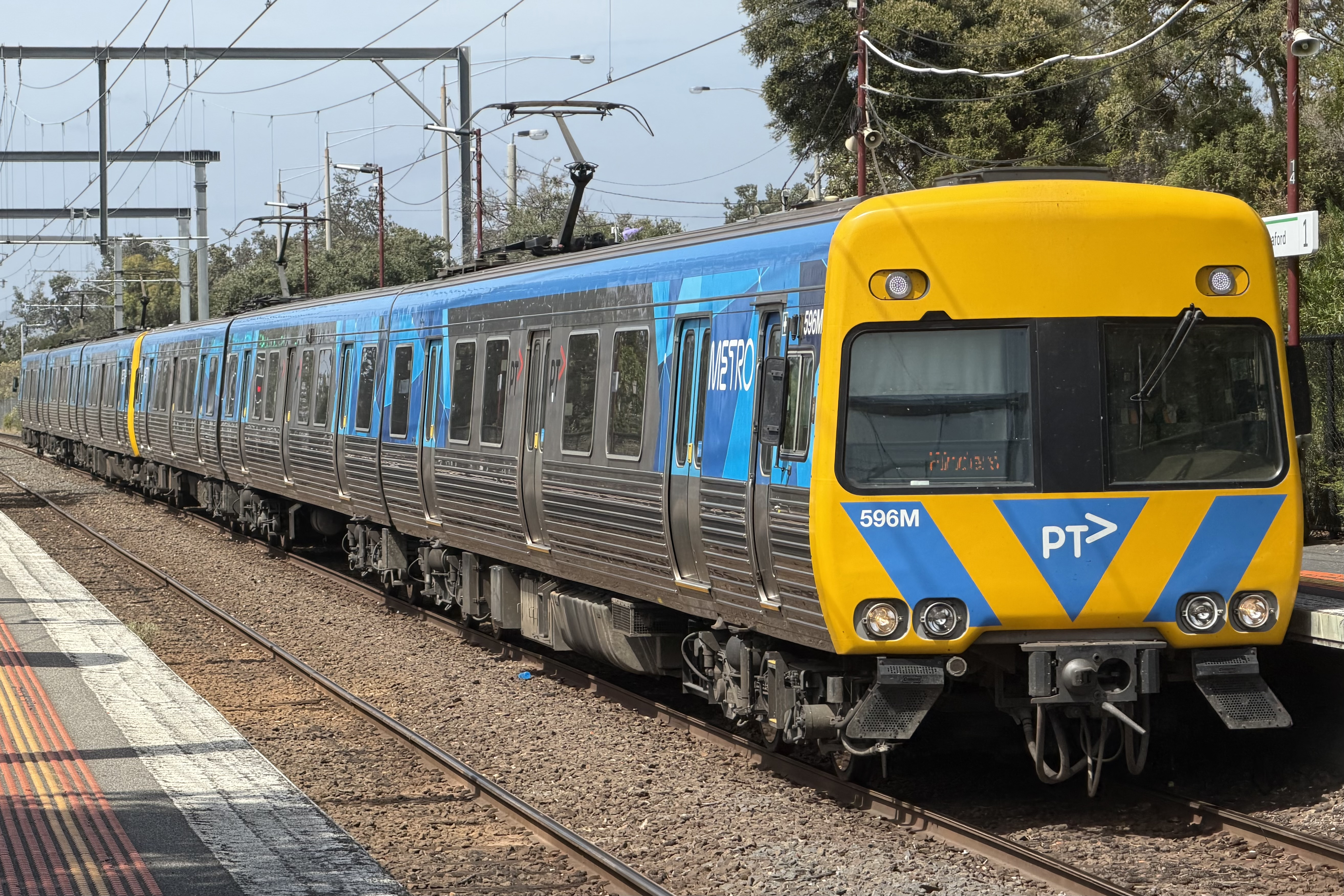
Alstom Comeng

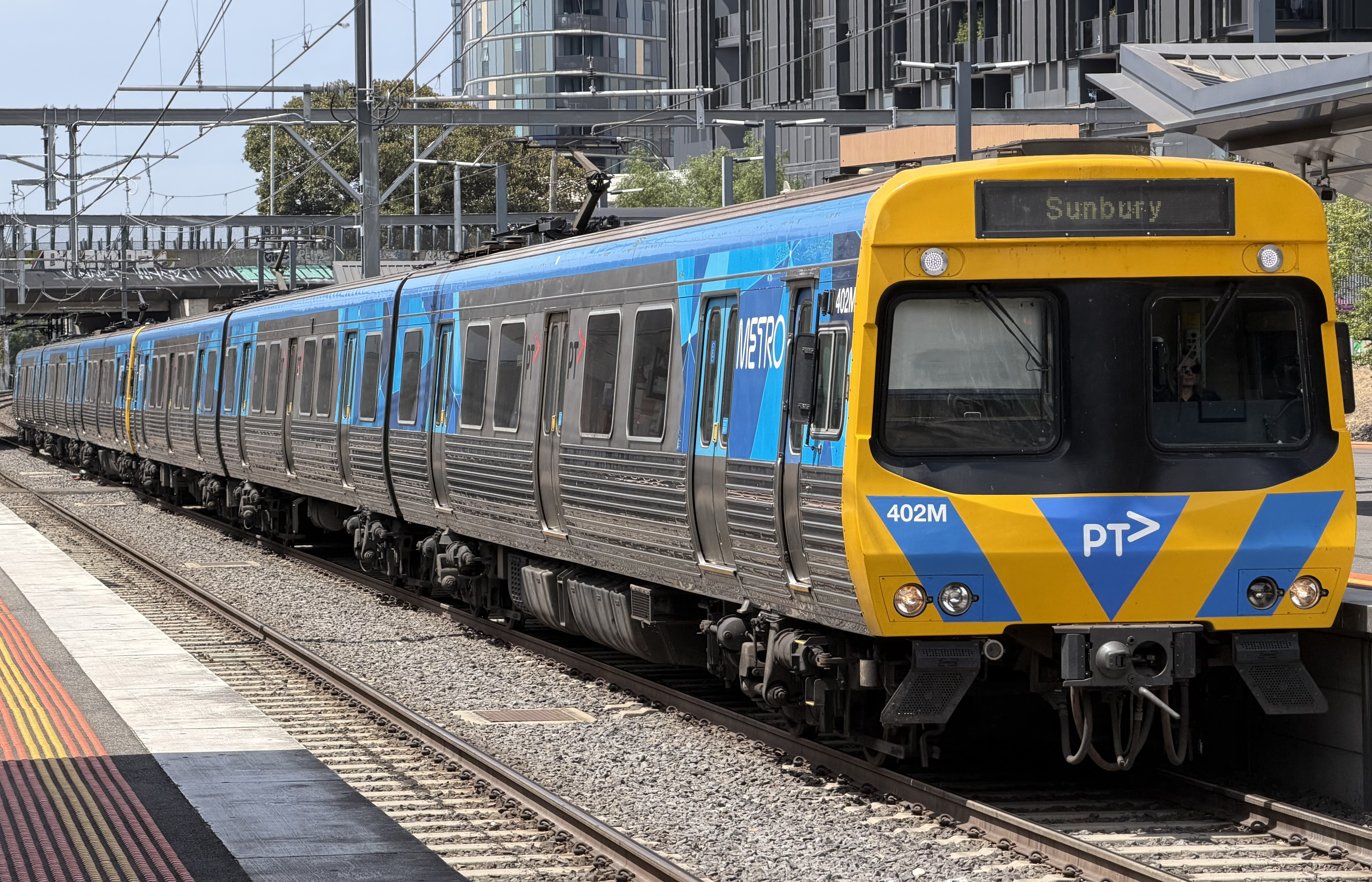
EDI Comeng

Life extension refurbishments were carried out between 2017 and 2021

From 2017 to 2021, the entirety of the existing Comeng fleet undertook a $75 million life extension refurbishment program with a number of upgrades taking place in order to allow the fleet to operate reliably and safely for at least another decade prior to their retirement. These upgrades were carried out in stages (1, 2 & 3), focusing on external, internal, mechanical and safety system upgrades.

Stage 1 of the life extension refurbishment works revolved only on exterior modifications, with much of the mechanical and safety systems remaining the same and their interiors largely unaltered from their 2014/2015 modifications. 25% of the existing Comeng fleet undertook only the stage 1 life extension refurbishment. The stage 1 upgrades include:

- LED marker lights
- New vinyl stickering with PTV branding identity livery on the exterior fibreglass front panels.
- Removal of external handles and step ladders at the leading end of all motor cars to reduce instances of train surfing.

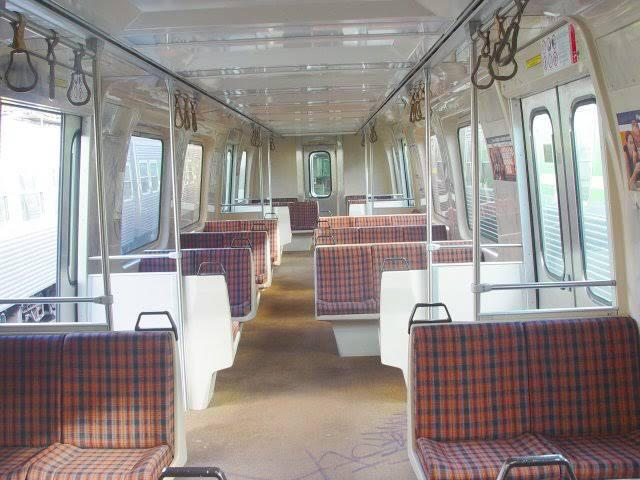
Original (pre 2000s)

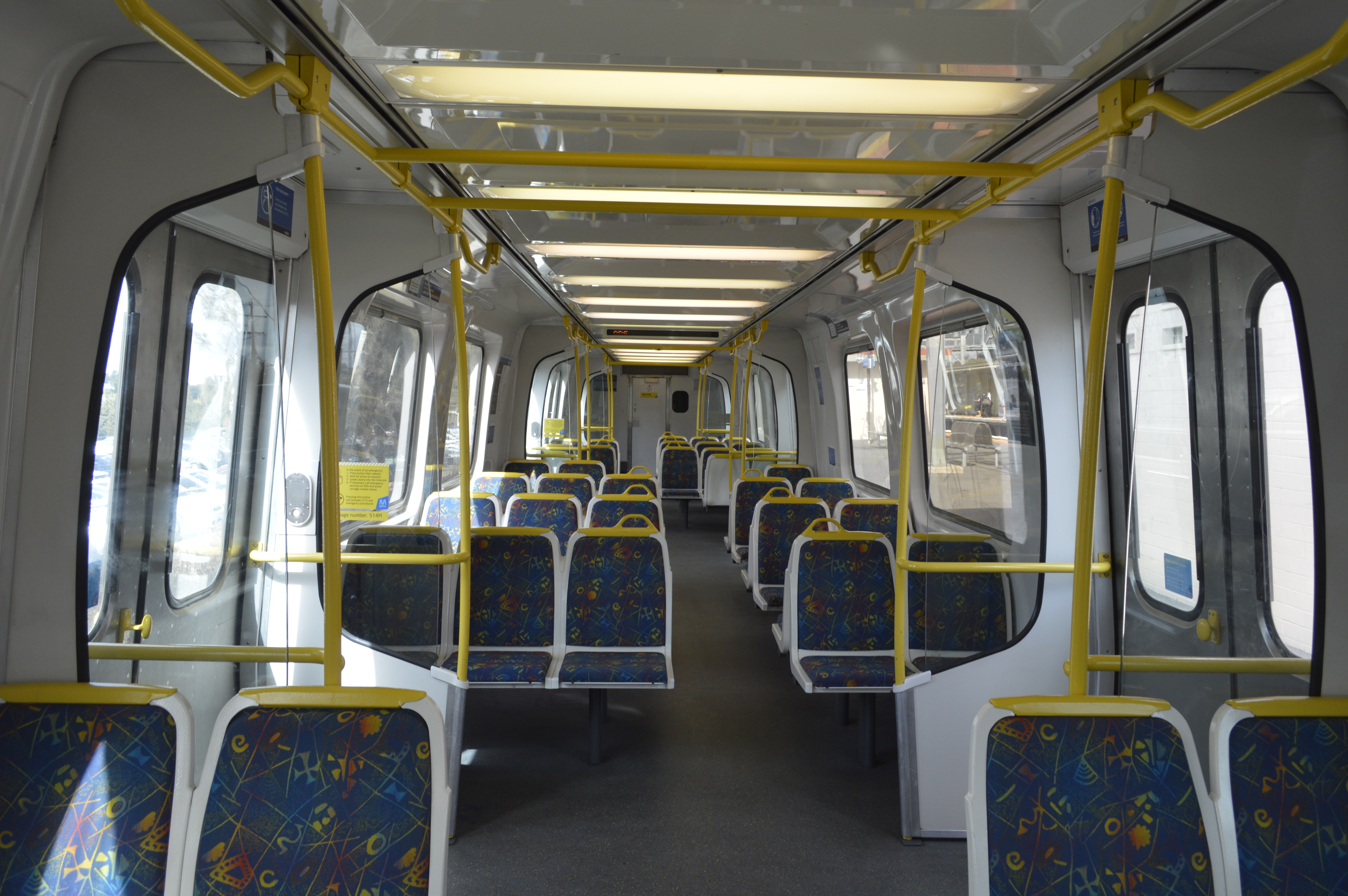
EDI Comeng with Connex interior after transfer from M>Train

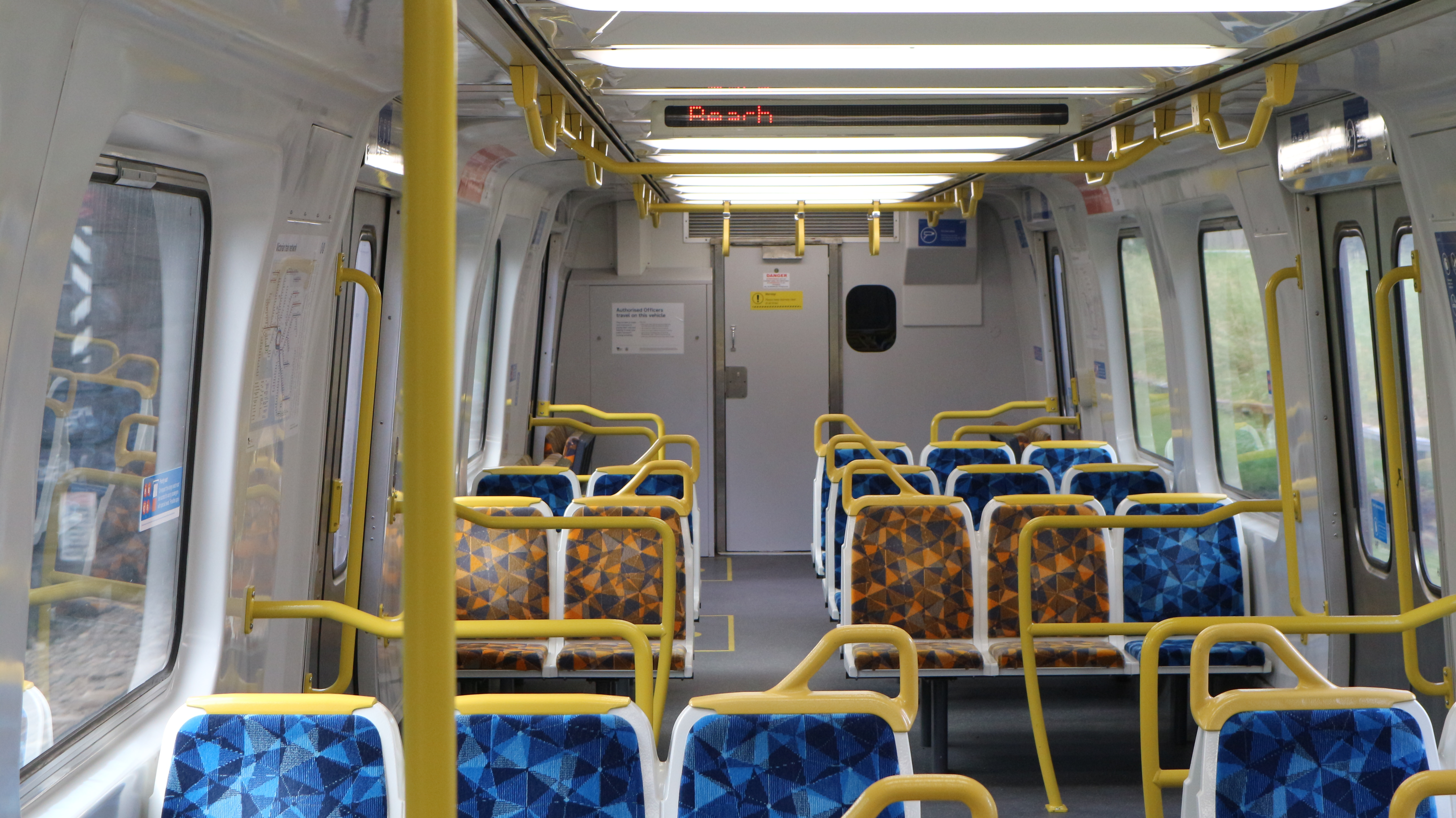
EDI Comeng – Stage 2 upgrades

Stage 1 upgrades did not affect the interior of the trains as they were only external changes.

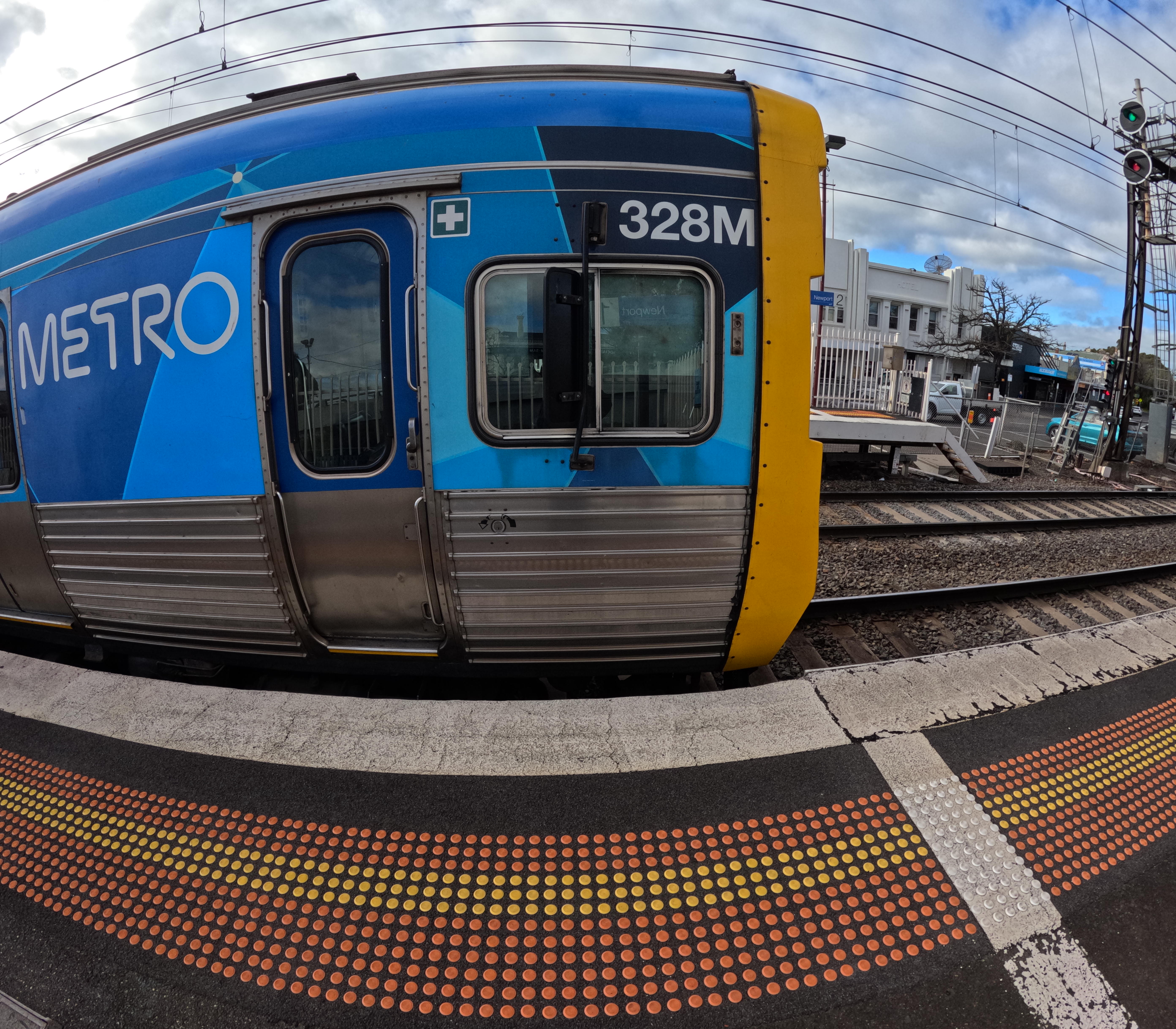
Side view of a Metro EDI Comeng 328M at Newport bound for Werribee

Stage 2 of the life extension refurbishment works concentrated on both interior and mechanical upgrades, with 75% of the existing Comeng fleet undertaking the stage 2 refurbishment. In addition to the stage 1 upgrades, the stage 2 upgrades include:

- Updated upholstery – Seats in Connex rainbow-textured pattern were updated to Public Transport Victoria's corporate identity in either blue or orange (priority seating) geometric design.
- Additional and upgraded grab handles and poles.
- Concertina style enclosed gangways between carriages.
- Improved saloon lighting and additional handholds.
- Door upgrades.
- Improvements to the driver's panel.

Stage 3 of the life extension refurbishment works focused on communications and additional mechanical upgrades, with 31% of the Comeng fleet, namely the disc brake units, having been further enhanced with these upgrades. These sets will more than likely be the last Comeng sets to remain in service when they will be eventually retired. In addition to the stage 2 upgrades, the stage 3 upgrades include:

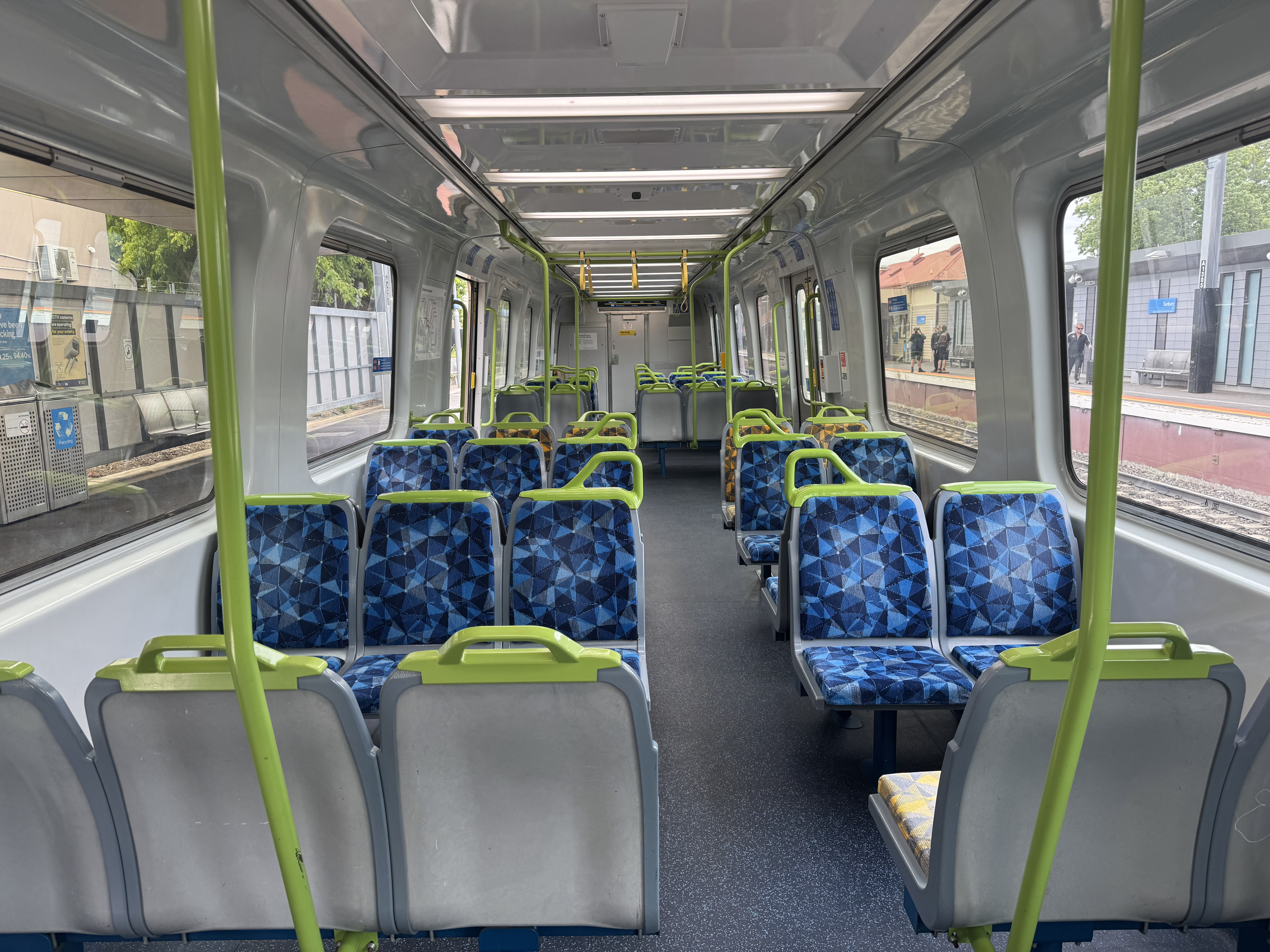
The interior of a Stage 3 life extension upgraded Alstom Comeng, November 2025

- New external LED destination signs.
- New dynamic Passenger Information Screens which displays real time data.
- Improved safety enhancements, including an upgrade to high definition CCTV cameras with better clarity and a wider field of view, and new emergency help points.
- Improvements to hearing aid links with a new and upgraded speaker and onboard announcement system.
- Improvements to the overall air compression system powering the brakes, doors, pantographs and traction systems.

The life extension refurbishment program was completed by the end of 2021 with 75% of the Comeng units having undergone the stages 2/3 upgrades. As of June 2023, all stage 1 sets, along with some stage 2 sets have been scrapped, having since been replaced by the High Capacity Metro Trains.

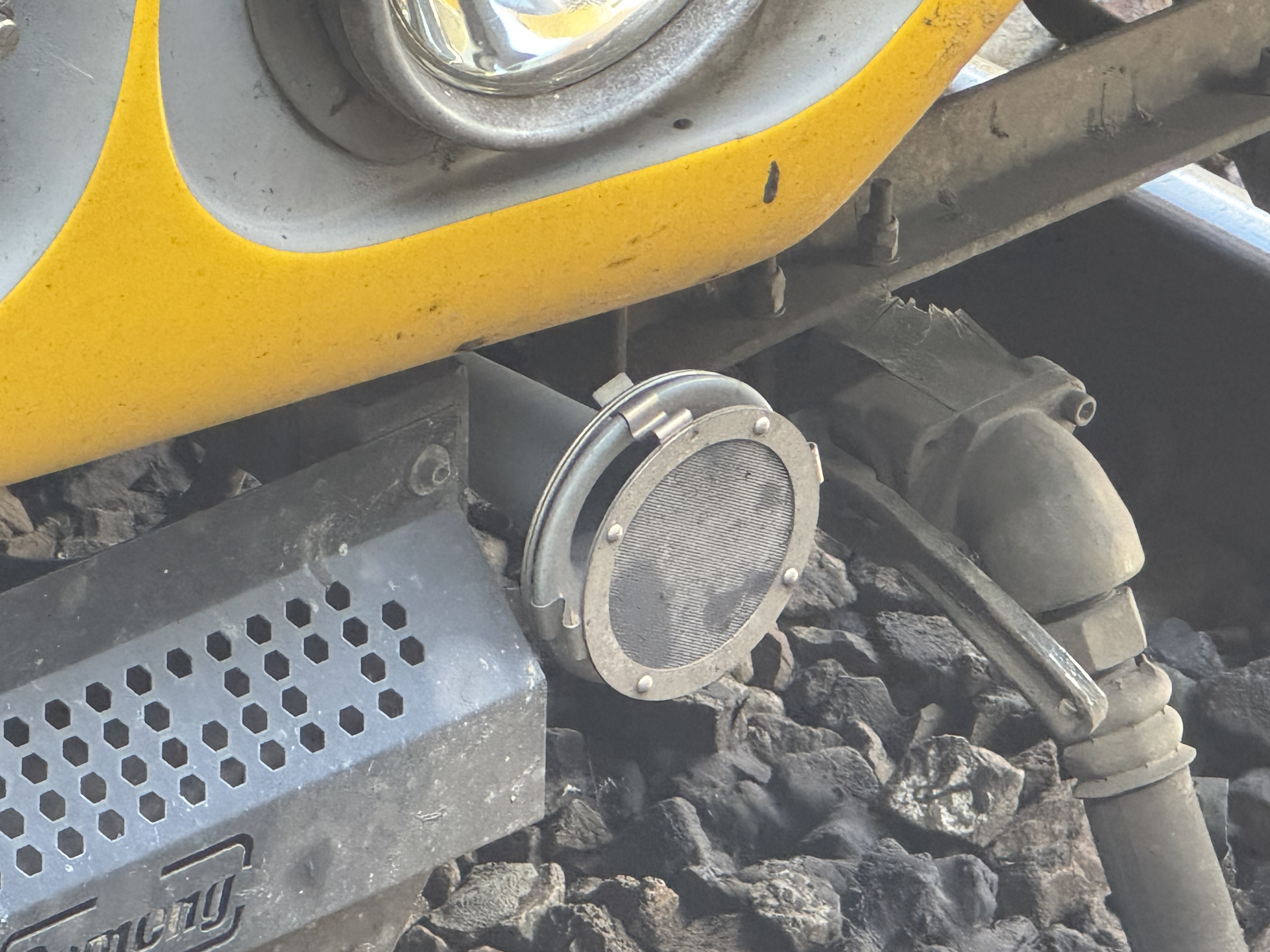
The Zollner Makrofon 370 horn on Comeng 678M

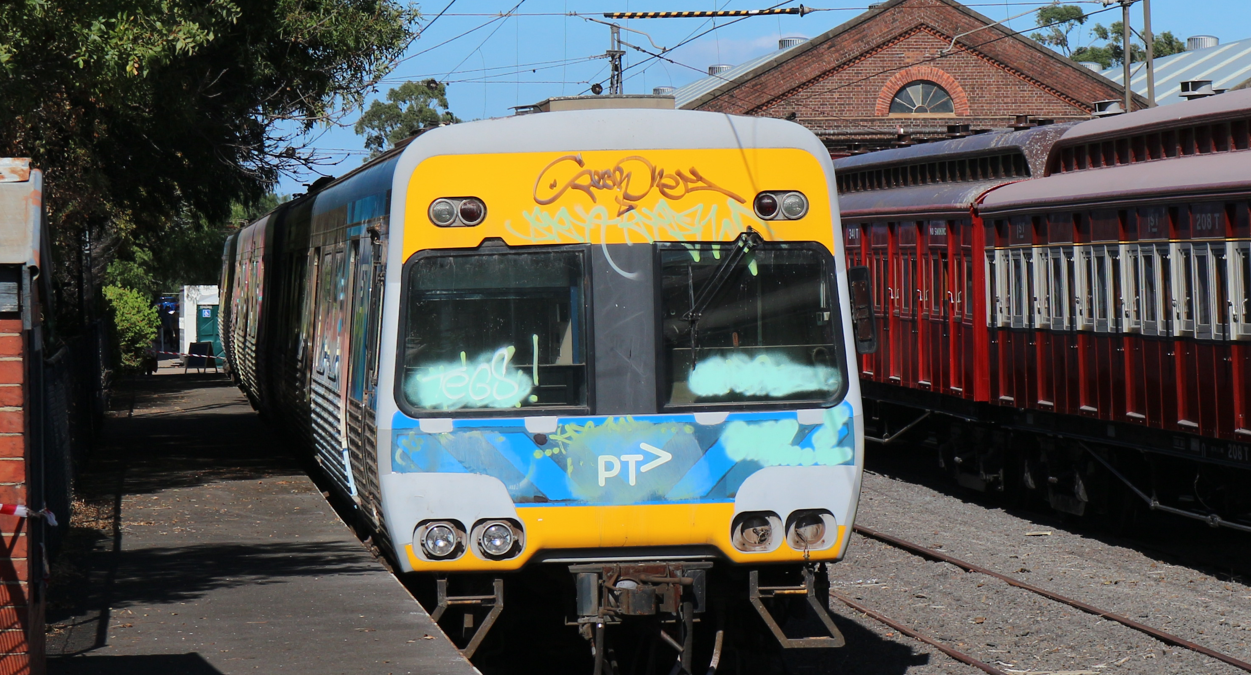
Chopper Comeng carriage 694M stored at Newport Workshops

=== Horn upgrades ===
2023–2024

In May 2023, 12 Comeng sets were trialled with a new Zöllner Makrofon 370 single tone horn, sounding similar to an X'Trapolis 100 horn, to replace the Roy Victor Butler (RVB) three chime horn. After it was deemed successful, from November 2023, the rest of the Comeng fleet started to receive the new horns, and was completed in late March 2024.

== Retirement ==
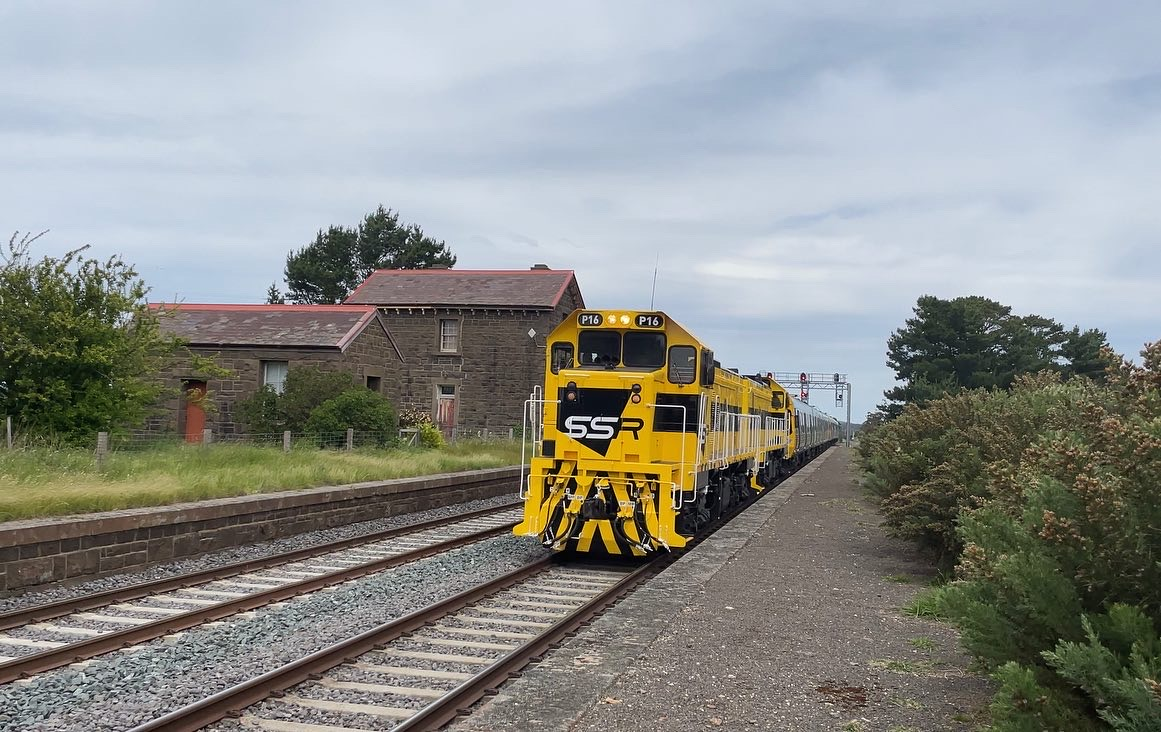
Two P classes haul two 3 car Comeng units to North Bendigo for scrapping.

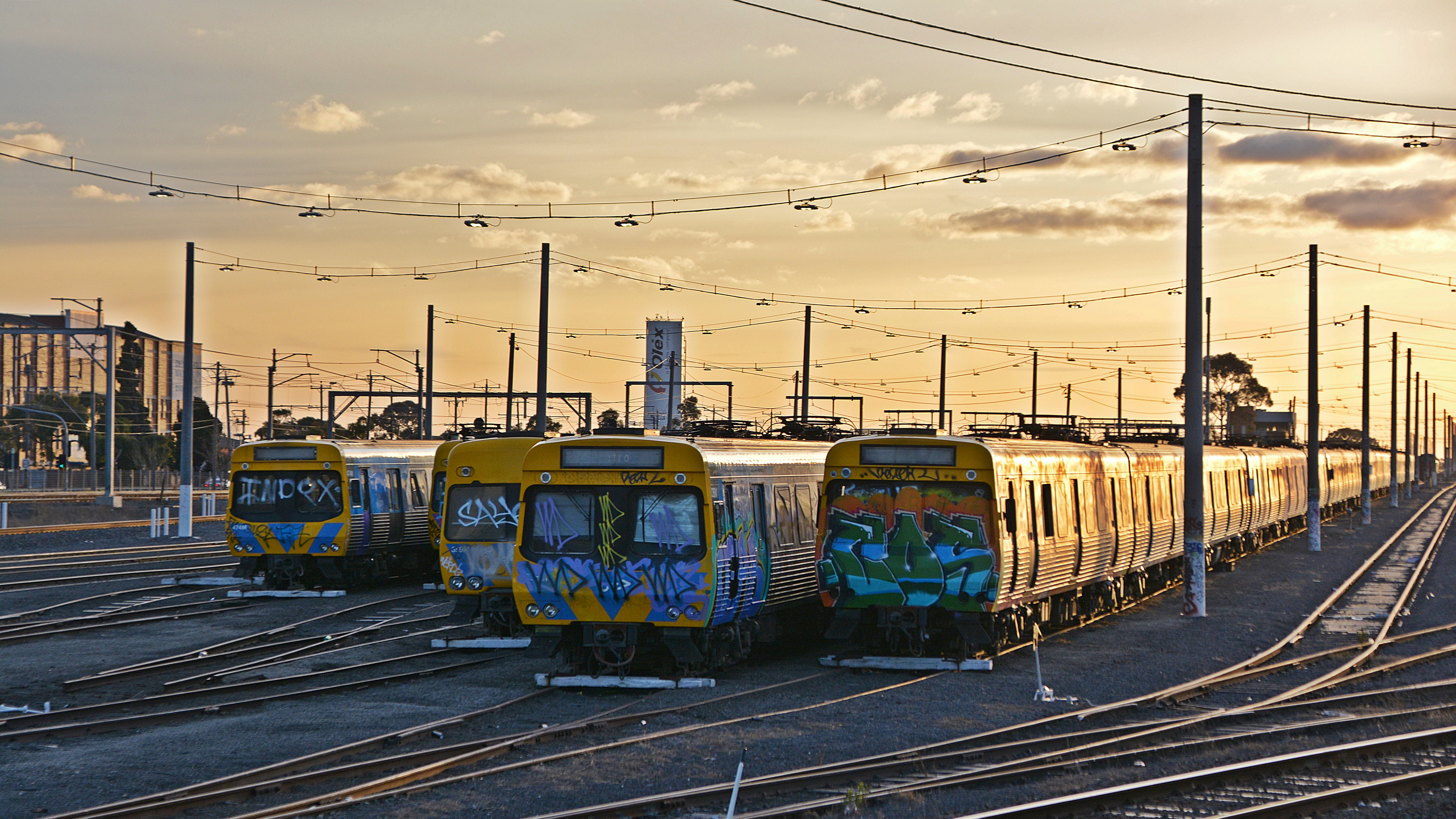
Stored Comeng Trains in Tottenham Yard

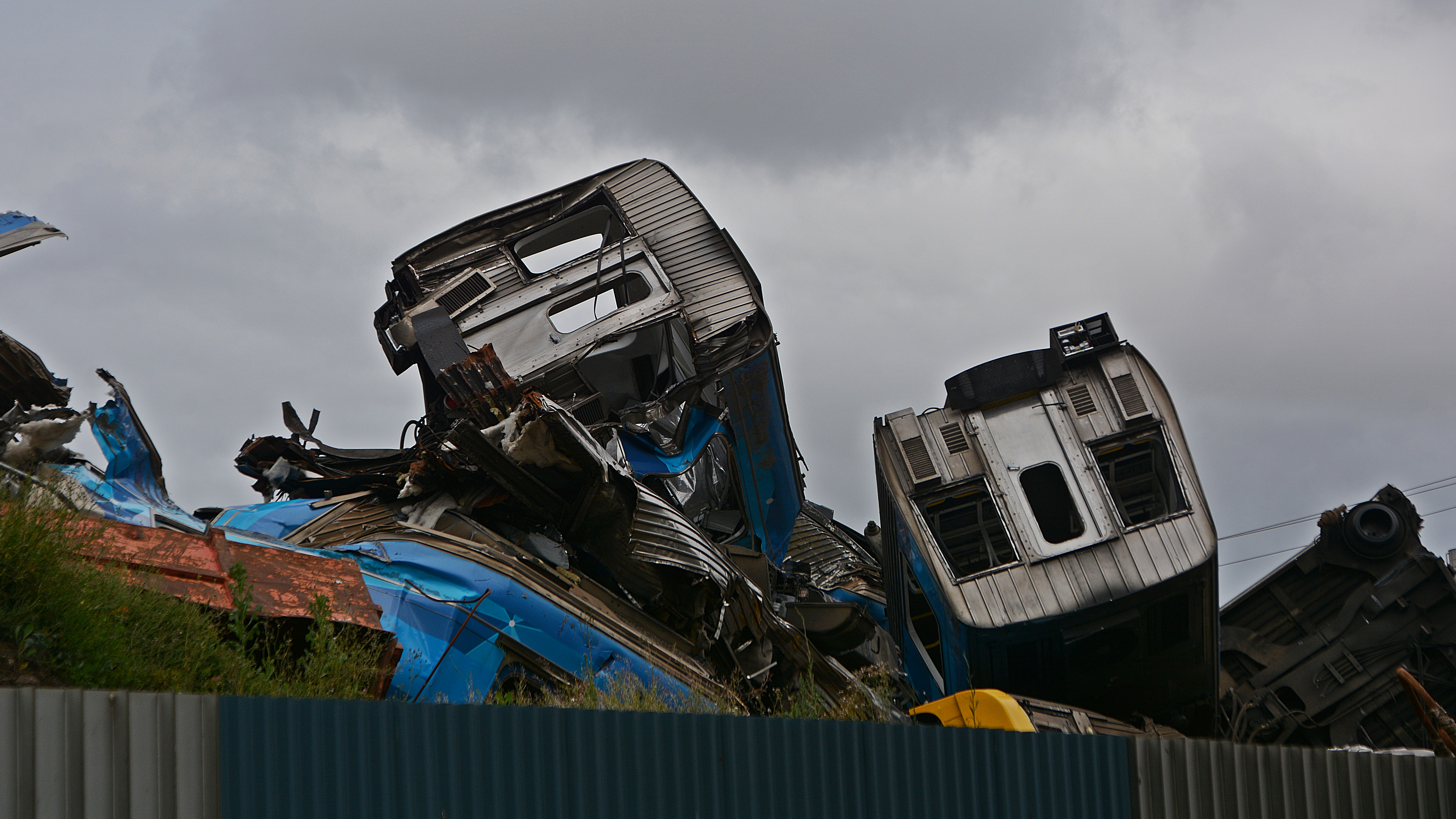
Scrapped carriages piled up at InfraBuild Recycling in Laverton North

In November 2017, none of the remaining Comeng chopper carriages including the (691M–698M) motors and (1196T–1199T) trailers were included in the new Metro contract, which saw them retired out of service. Half of these units were stored at Newport Workshops, while the other half have been supplying parts to the remaining Comeng units in service.

In 2018, Comeng set 313M-1007T-314M and 367M-1034T-368M were withdrawn from service and stored at Newport Workshops.

In 2019, it was revealed that if the X'Trapolis 2.0 was made, the Comengs could be out of service as early as 2026. However, it is most likely that the final Comeng set will be withdrawn closer to 2030.

On 21 August 2021, retired Comeng sets 321M-1107T-320M and 363M-1032T-364M were transferred to North Shore. These sets were replaced with the High Capacity Metro Trains, starting a long process of the retirement of Comeng sets, likely to take most of the decade. As of 1 June 2026, 87 3-car Comeng sets have been retired out of 187 three-car sets in service as of the formation of Metro Trains Melbourne.

On 9 February 2022, the first Comeng unit was scrapped since 2014. This saw the scrapping of set 338M-1092T-484M at Dandenong South. Subsequently, there have been 76 three-car Comeng sets scrapped as of 21 April 2026.

On 12 June 2022, the last of the Stage 1 Comengs (331M-1050T-400M & 393M-1048T-394M) were transferred to Newport Workshops to be decommissioned.

All remaining Comeng sets of the earlier 'tread brake' variety are now EDI refurbishments. These are internally referred to as 'Westcode' sets, while the disc brake variety is known as 'Knorr'. As of September 2022, all Alstom refurbished sets in the Westcode group had been withdrawn. As by this date, one chopper set (693M-1197T-694M) has been scrapped.

In June 2023, all Alstom tread brake Comeng sets have been scrapped, having only receiving the stage 1 life extension upgrades. 359M-1030T-360M was the final stage 1 Alstom refurbished set to be scrapped. By this date, the remaining chopper sets have all been scrapped.

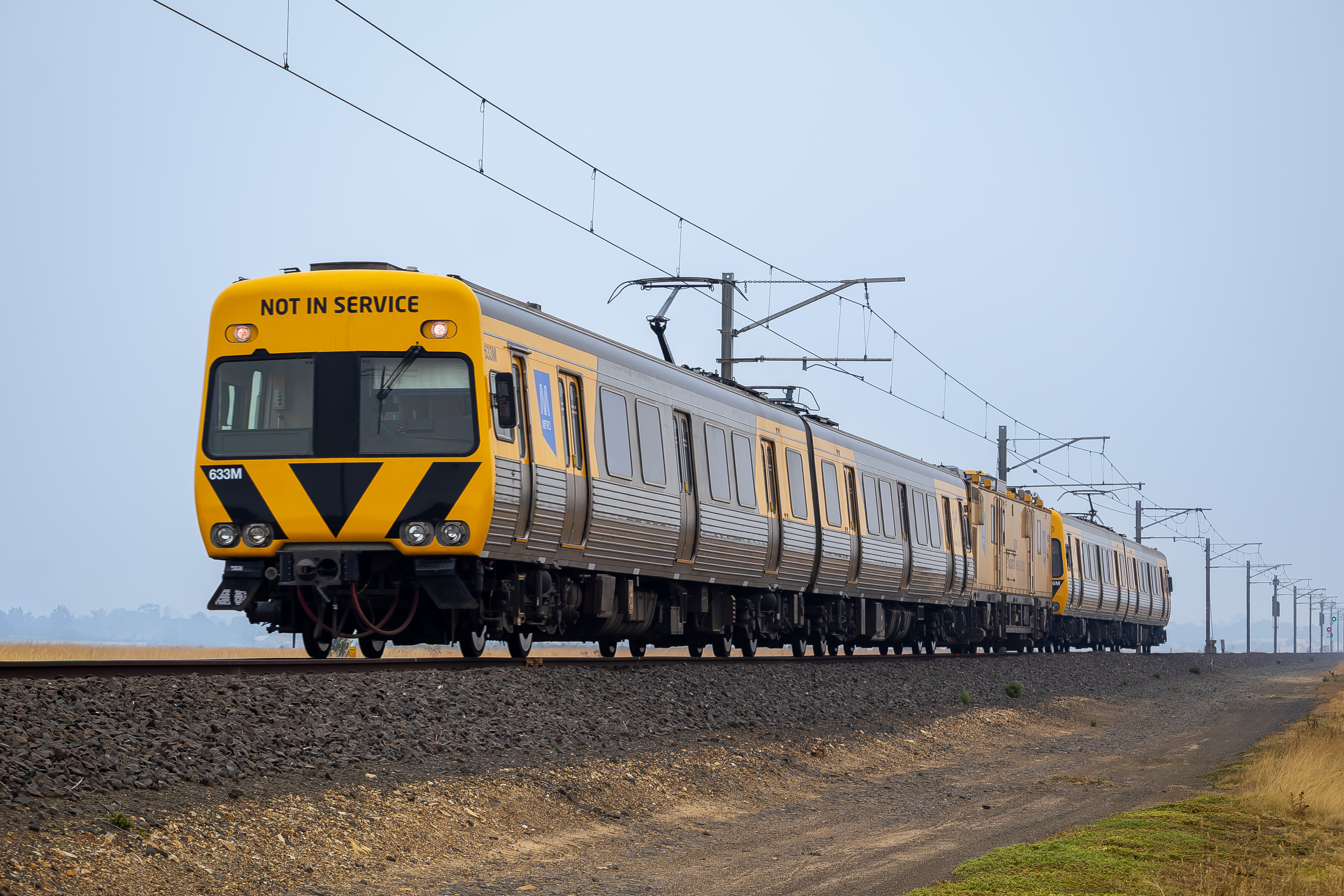
Evette (633M-634M-EV120-586M-585M) heading to Werribee near Westona

On 7 May 2025, 633M-1167T-634M and 585M-1143T-586M were withdrawn from service, and 1167T and 1143T were scrapped, while the motor carriages, 633M-634M and 585M-586M were converted as two car sets and were retained for use on infrastructure evaluation trains on the suburban network. The two motor carriages on 633M-634M and 585M-586M are both expected to remain in some form of service far longer than other members of the class.

From 1 February 2026, following the full opening of the Metro Tunnel, 12 3-car Comeng sets were placed in storage at Calder Park Sidings. This involved six 3-car Westcode EDI Rail Refurbished Comeng and six 3-car Alstom-refurbished Comeng sets. Since the placement of these sets in storage, one Westcode EDI Rail Refurbished Comeng and four Alstom Refurbished Comeng sets were retired and consequentially scrapped, however, five EDI Refurbished Comeng sets and four Alstom Refurbished Comeng sets have been returned to full revenue service. However, five other 3-car EDI Refurbished Comeng sets, and three other 3-car Alstom Refurbished Comeng sets were scrapped. As of November 2026, this renders 47 Knorr-Bremse Alstom Refurbished Comeng and 49 Westcode EDI Rail Refurbished Comeng sets in full revenue service, a total of 96 three car sets.

== Stored carriages ==
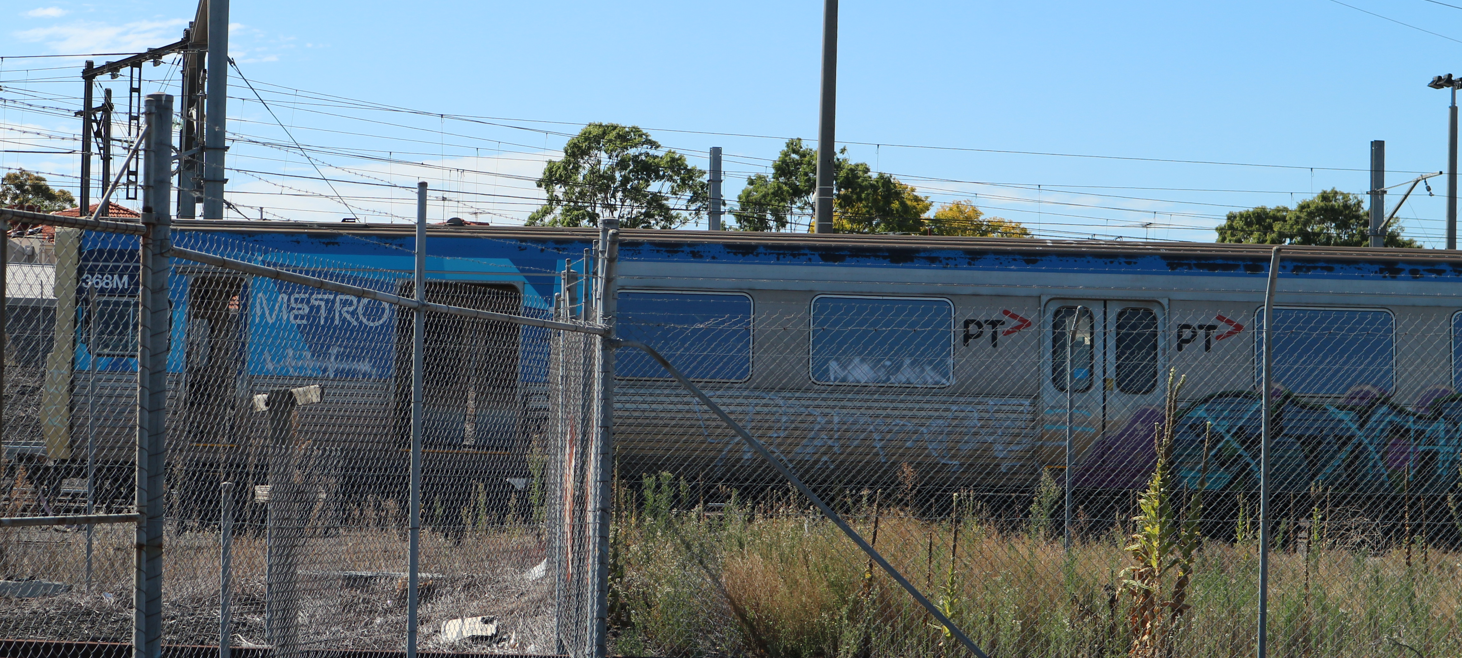
Car 368M stored at Newport Workshops awaiting scrapping

70 Comeng carriages have been scrapped or removed from service.

Eight carriages have been scrapped prior to the major withdrawals (from 2021 onwards): 315M, 388M, 1165T, 1109T, 533M, 305M, 1003T and 306M. 315M was burnt out at Hurstbridge on 9 April 1983, along with Tait 472M, 388M was hit by V/Line locomotive N457 at Officer, 1165T was burnt out at Northcote, 1109T was damaged in a collision with Comeng 634M at Epping, while 533M was burnt out by vandals at Merlynston in April 2002. Both 1109T and 533M were stored at the Ballarat Workshops and were scrapped in August 2010. In November 2012, 305M-1003T-306M crashed into a truck at Abbotts Road in Dandenong South. These cars were stored in Dandenong South near the crash site, visible from the Cranbourne Line until May 2014, when they were scrapped.

Following the Dandenong South collision, set 583M-1022T-589M was withdrawn and stored at Newport Workshops. This set was trailing 305M-1003T-306M but received significantly less damage. It never re-entered service and was later scrapped during the major withdrawals, being the first disc brake series set to be scrapped.

Another four carriages have been stored: 500M, 671M, 672M, and 1186T. 500M was burnt out at Sandringham in 2002 and can be seen in a yard close to the North Williamstown station side of the Newport railway workshops. 671M was partly burnt out at Gowrie in 1994. Spare cars 672M and 1186T, which were made redundant after 671M was burnt, underwent a prototype refurbishment before being stored. 671M is currently in use by Fire Rescue Victoria for firefighter training.

In late 2024, Alstom set 649M-1175T-650M, and 571M-1136T-572M were withdrawn from service and stored at Craigieburn Workshops, being the first Stage 3 life extended Comeng set to be withdrawn. In late 2025, 575M-1138T-576M was also removed from passenger service and stored at Craigieburn Workshops. These sets were stripped off parts compatible with the rest of the remaining fleet. On 3 March 2026, 575M-1138T-576M, and 649M-1175T-650M were eventually transferred to McIntyre for scrapping, while 571M-1136T-572M remained in storage before it was transferred to McIntyre on 22 May 2026 for scrapping.

== Incidents ==
In February 2003, EDI Comeng set 393M-1048T-394M rolled away from Broadmeadows and collided with a V/Line N class locomotive going to Bacchus Marsh. No one was killed, but eight were injured.

In November 2012, EDI Comeng set 305M-1003T-306M coupled with Alstom set 583M-1022T-589M crashed into a truck at Abbotts Road in Dandenong South. 305M-1003T-306M were stored in Dandenong South before being scrapped in 2014. while 583M-1022T-589M received significantly less damage, the set was also withdrawn from service and was scrapped in early 2023.

On 25 February 2019, EDI Comeng 333M collided with a buffer stop at the end of a stabling siding at Newport. The train was withdrawn from service, previously stored and eventually scrapped. EDI Comeng 314M was modified to run with 1017T and 334M. 333M was coupled with existing retired cars 313M and 1007T and was scrapped in late 2022.

On 10 October 2021, set 593M-1147T-594M, and 375M-1094T-488M collided with a vehicle at Dandenong south on an up Cranbourne service, the set underwent assessment at Macaulay, with 593M-1147T-594M undergoing repairs and re-entered service on 1 July 2022.

On 14 April 2022, Comeng set 445M-1073T-446M collided with a motor vehicle near Broadmeadows whilst running the 16:35 up Craigieburn service. This set was withdrawn from service shortly afterwards and was transferred to Bendigo Workshops on 2 June 2022 for scrapping.

On 25 February 2026, set 519M-1110T-520M collided with a motor vehicle at Victoria Street level crossing in Brunswick, just north of Brunswick station whilst running an up Upfield service. This set was withdrawn from service and was transferred to McIntyre for recycling on 27 March 2026.
