= Kensington railway station, Melbourne =

Railway station in Melbourne, Australia

Kensington
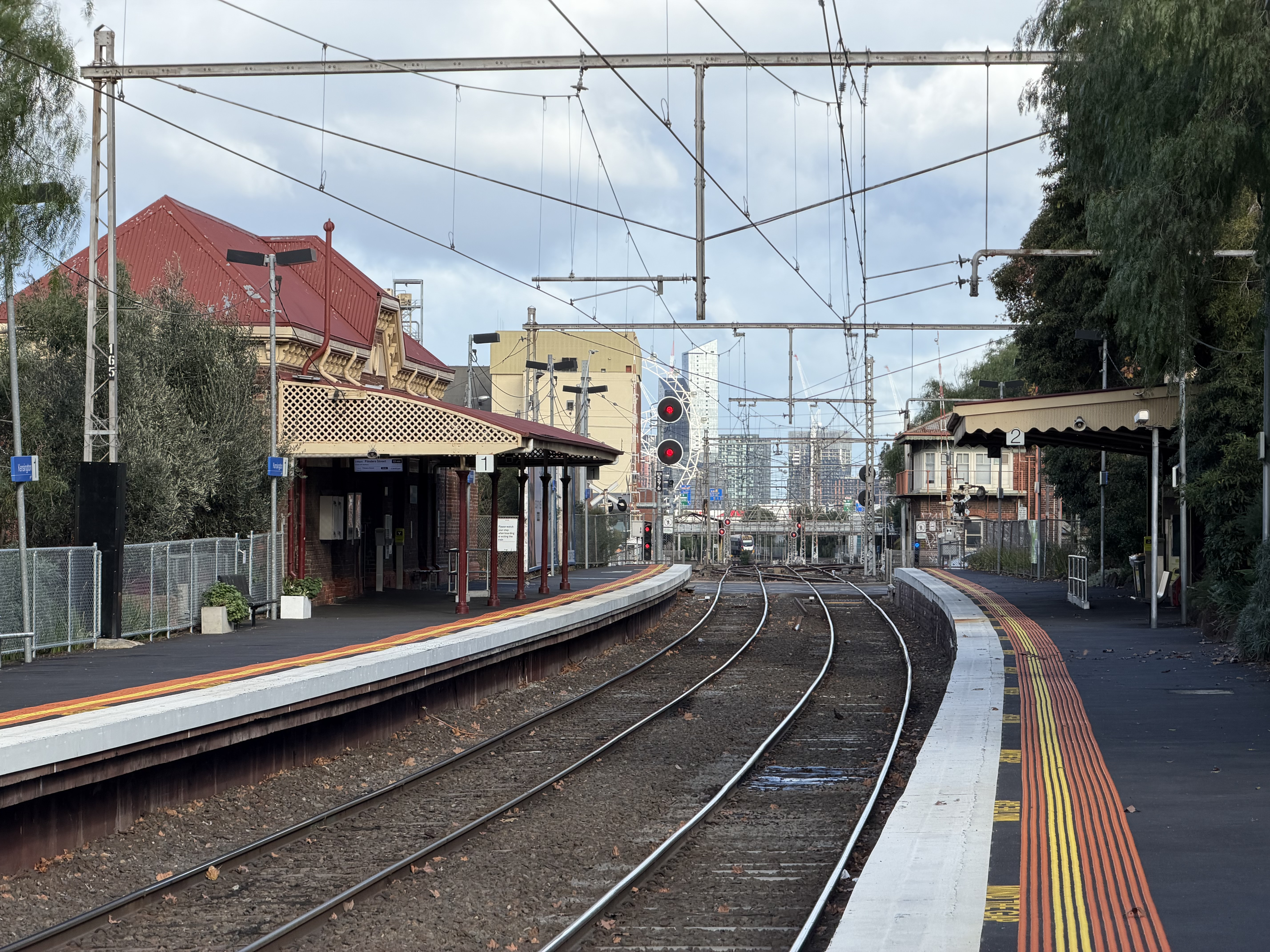
- Southbound view from Platform 2, July 2026

General information
- Location: Belair Street, Kensington, Victoria 3031; City of Melbourne; Australia
- Coordinates: 37°47′38″S 144°55′51″E
- System: PTV commuter rail station
- Owner: VicTrack
- Operator: Metro Trains
- Line: Craigieburn
- Distance: 3.58 kilometres from Southern Cross
- Platforms: 2 side
- Tracks: 2
- Connections: Bus

Construction
- Structure type: Ground
- Accessible: No – steep ramp

Other information
- Status: Operational, unstaffed
- Station code: KEN
- Fare zone: Myki zone 1
- Website: Public Transport Victoria

History
- Opened: 1 November 1860; 165 years ago
- Closed: 1 July 1864
- Rebuilt: 9 October 1871
- Electrified: May 1919 (1500 V DC overhead)

Passengers
2005–2018 numbers
2005–2006	453,280
2006–2007	489,745 ▲8.04%
2007–2008	515,166 ▲5.19%
2008–2009	556,954 ▲8.11%
2009–2010	566,692 ▲1.74%
2010–2011	577,507 ▲1.9%
2011–2012	526,695 ▼8.79%
2012–2013	Not measured
2013–2014	553,078 ▲5%
2014–2015	540,515 ▼2.27%
2015–2016	563,789 ▲4.3%
2016–2017	550,677 ▼2.32%
2017–2018	546,510 ▼0.75%
- 2018–2019: 533,050 ▼2.46%
- 2019–2020: 424,600 ▼20.34%
- 2020–2021: 211,900 ▼50.09%
- 2021–2022: 242,300 ▲14.34%
- 2022–2023: 368,400 ▲52.04%
- 2023–2024: 435,300 ▲18.16%

Services
Preceding station	Metro Trains	Following station
North Melbourne towards Flinders Street	Craigieburn line	Newmarket towards Craigieburn
Flemington Racecourse line does not stop here
Track layout
Location

Kensington station is a railway station operated by Metro Trains Melbourne on the Craigieburn line, part of the Melbourne rail network. It serves the northern suburb of Kensington in Melbourne, Victoria, Australia. Kensington station is a ground-level unstaffed station, featuring two side platforms. It opened on 1 November 1860, with the current station provided in 1871. The station originally closed on 1 July 1864, but was later reopened on 9 October 1871.

Special services to Flemington Racecourse and Showgrounds pass through the station, but do not stop, with signs on Platform 2 advising passengers of this.

== History ==
Kensington station opened on 1 November 1860, just over a week after the railway line to Essendon opened as part of the private Melbourne and Essendon Railway Company. The station closed with the line on 1 July 1864, due to failure to make a profit. The needs of the Newmarket Saleyards and Racecourse, and the increasing difficulties in driving cattle mustered in the north and west of the Colony overland from North Melbourne, inspired the line's purchase by the Government and its reopening on 9 October 1871. Like the suburb itself, the station was named after Kensington, in central London.

Increasing population in the Flemington-Kensington area resulted in new station facilities being built on the up (Melbourne-bound) side in 1888. Campbell and Gray were the contractors for the station, while A. Challingsworth built the down (west) side in 1905, together with improvements at Moonee Ponds and Essendon in 1908. This also was the first line to run electric trains in Australia. Presumably as a mark of the increasing traffic on the now duplicated line, contractor A. T. Taylor built the signal box in 1887 during the reign of R. Watson as Engineer in Chief of the railways. In 1965, the interlocked gates at the Macaulay Road level crossing were replaced with boom barriers. The signal box is located at the up end of the station, just past the level crossing. A siding is also located at the up end, used for the nearby grain silos.

On 5 November 1986, a collision between a Broadmeadows-bound Comeng train and locomotives H4, T413 and Y119 occurred near the station. Also in that year, a number of goods lines to the south of the station were booked out of use. The overhead wires for these lines were also removed around this time.

== Description ==
The most obvious difference between the two station buildings is the cantilever verandah, with its scalloped ripple-iron valance and the elegant post-supported one opposite. Similar to Moonee Ponds and Ascot Vale, the station has a hipped roof profile, convex verandah with trellis end filling and numerous eaves brackets completing the Italian influence here and in most other station buildings in the state. Coloured brickwork and the pointed arch at openings lend a medieval time scale. Elevated siting has provided scope for an extensive wall and a piered iron fence to face the plantation reserve below; this appears to be from the 1905 improvements to the complex. The down side station building is simply a deep masonry wall, with stone quoining, similar fenestration and domed pylons at each end, injecting the contemporary Edwardian Free-Style element into what was otherwise a matching design to the 1889 station. Basalt rubble garden borders, pepper trees, pittosporum and acanthus are plantings probably synonymous with the 1905 improvements. Similar landscaped track margins occur to the south. The up platform is likely to be the original 1860 basalt coping and walls, whilst the down side probably dates from the 1880s. The signal box has an unusual design and is built in the manner of the nearby station buildings, with polychrome brickwork and a hipped roof form. Three sides of glazing at the upper level are accessed by a cantilevered wrought-iron walkway cum terrace, linked with ground by a timber stair. Detail includes a scalloped eaves valance and saltire-cross panels above the windows. Nearby, a pepper tree adds period to the site. The upside, downside and signal box buildings all form a group and collectively complement the Victorian era buildings in the Bellair Street shopping precinct.

== Platforms and services ==
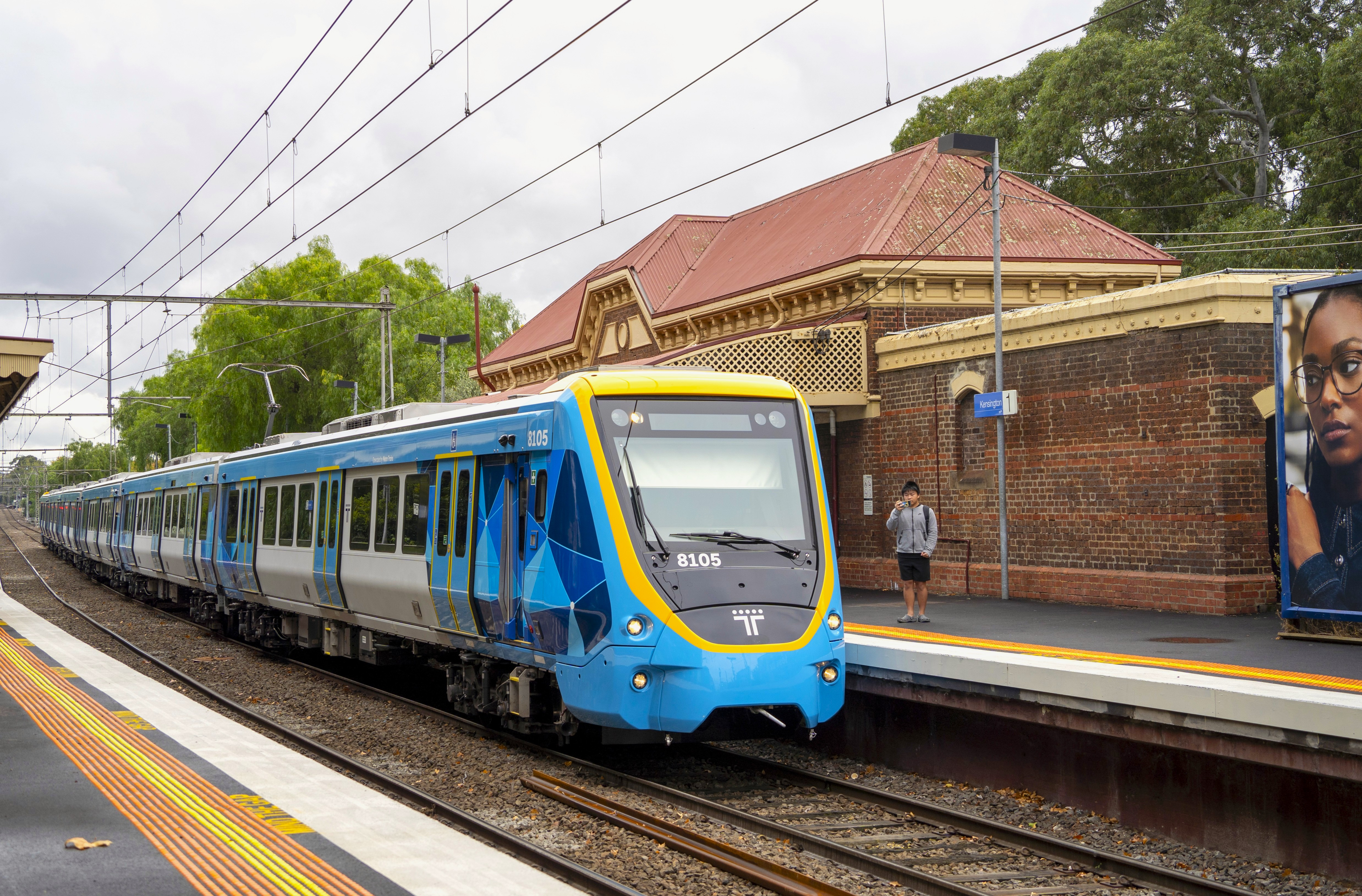
An X'Trapolis 2.0 running an up Craigieburn service City-bound at Platform 1 and overall features of the station, May 2026

Kensington has two side platforms. It is serviced by Metro Trains' Craigieburn line services.

Kensington platform arrangement
Platform	Line	Destination	Via	Service Type	Notes	Source
1	Craigieburn line	Flinders Street	City Loop	All stations	See City Loop for operating patterns	
2	Craigieburn line	Craigieburn		All stations		

== Transport links ==
One bus route operates via Kensington station, under contract to Public Transport Victoria:

- 402 : Footscray station – East Melbourne (operated by Transit Systems Victoria)
