= Oak Park railway station, Melbourne =

Railway station in Melbourne, Australia

Oak Park
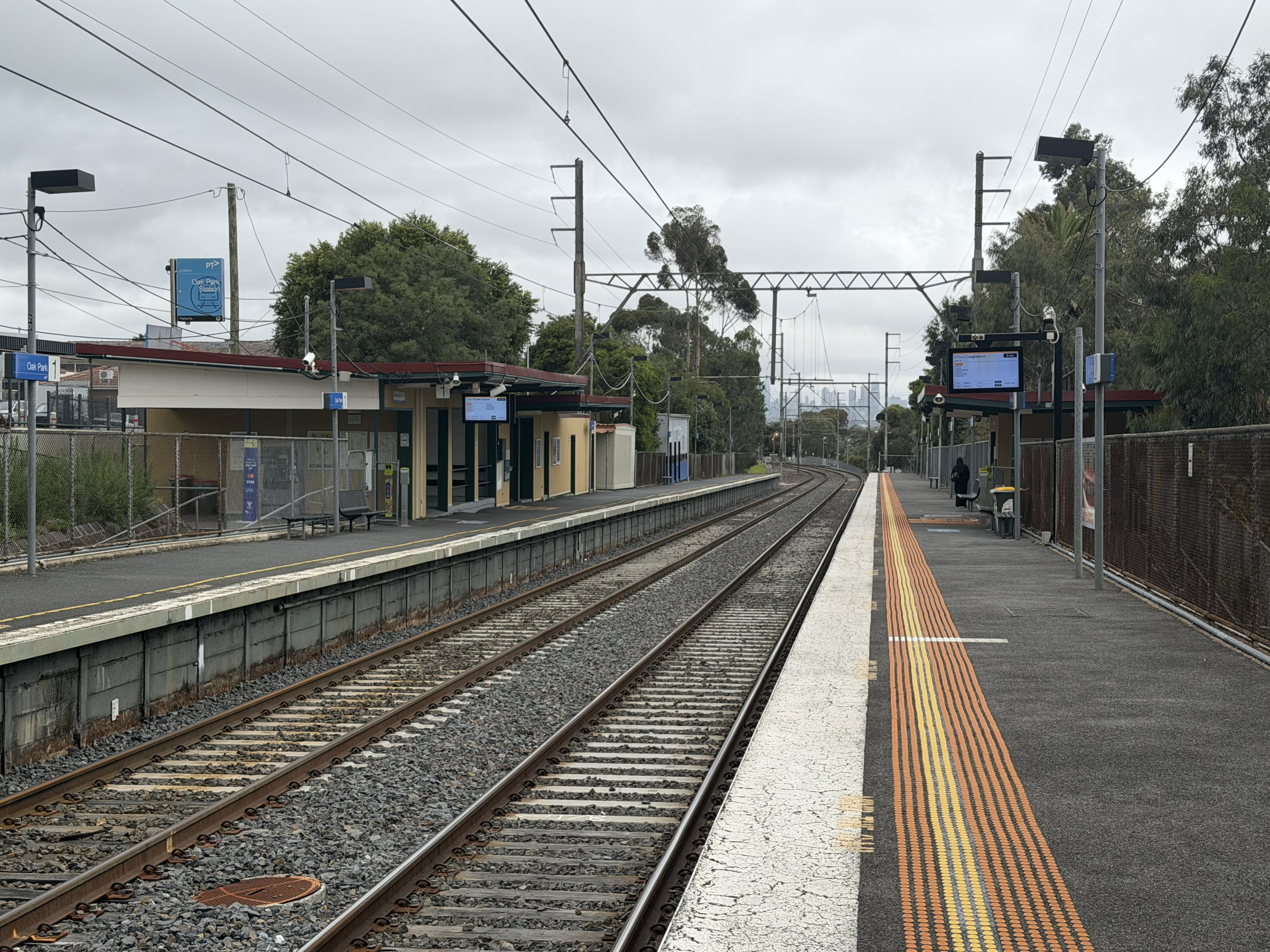
- Southbound view from Platform 2, April 2026

General information
- Location: Waterloo Road, Oak Park, Victoria 3046; City of Merri-bek; Australia
- Coordinates: 37°43′04″S 144°55′18″E
- System: PTV commuter rail station
- Owner: VicTrack
- Operator: Metro Trains
- Line: Craigieburn
- Distance: 12.88 kilometres from Southern Cross
- Platforms: 2 side
- Tracks: 2

Construction
- Structure type: Ground
- Parking: 37
- Accessible: No – steep ramp

Other information
- Status: Operational, unstaffed
- Station code: OPK
- Fare zone: Myki zone 1/2
- Website: Public Transport Victoria

History
- Opened: 13 August 1956; 70 years ago
- Electrified: September 1921 (1500 V DC overhead)

Passengers
2005–2018 numbers
2005–2006	314,041
2006–2007	356,451 ▲13.5%
2007–2008	419,816 ▲17.77%
2008–2009	472,403 ▲12.52%
2009–2010	489,858 ▲3.69%
2010–2011	440,328 ▼10.11%
2011–2012	412,666 ▼6.28%
2012–2013	Not measured
2013–2014	448,982 ▲8.8%
2014–2015	438,253 ▼2.38%
2015–2016	493,811 ▲12.67%
2016–2017	521,908 ▲5.68%
2017–2018	534,513 ▲2.41%
- 2018–2019: 555,523 ▲3.93%
- 2019–2020: 479,050 ▼13.76%
- 2020–2021: 218,300 ▼54.43%
- 2021–2022: 237,100 ▲8.61%
- 2022–2023: 368,050 ▲55.23%
- 2023–2024: 437,000 ▲18.73%

Services
Preceding station	Metro Trains	Following station
Pascoe Vale towards Flinders Street	Craigieburn line	Glenroy towards Craigieburn
Track layout
Location

Oak Park station is a railway station operated by Metro Trains Melbourne on the Craigieburn line, part of the Melbourne rail network. It serves the northern suburb of Oak Park in Melbourne, Victoria, Australia. Oak Park station is a ground-level unstaffed station, featuring two side platforms. It opened on 13 August 1956.

== History ==
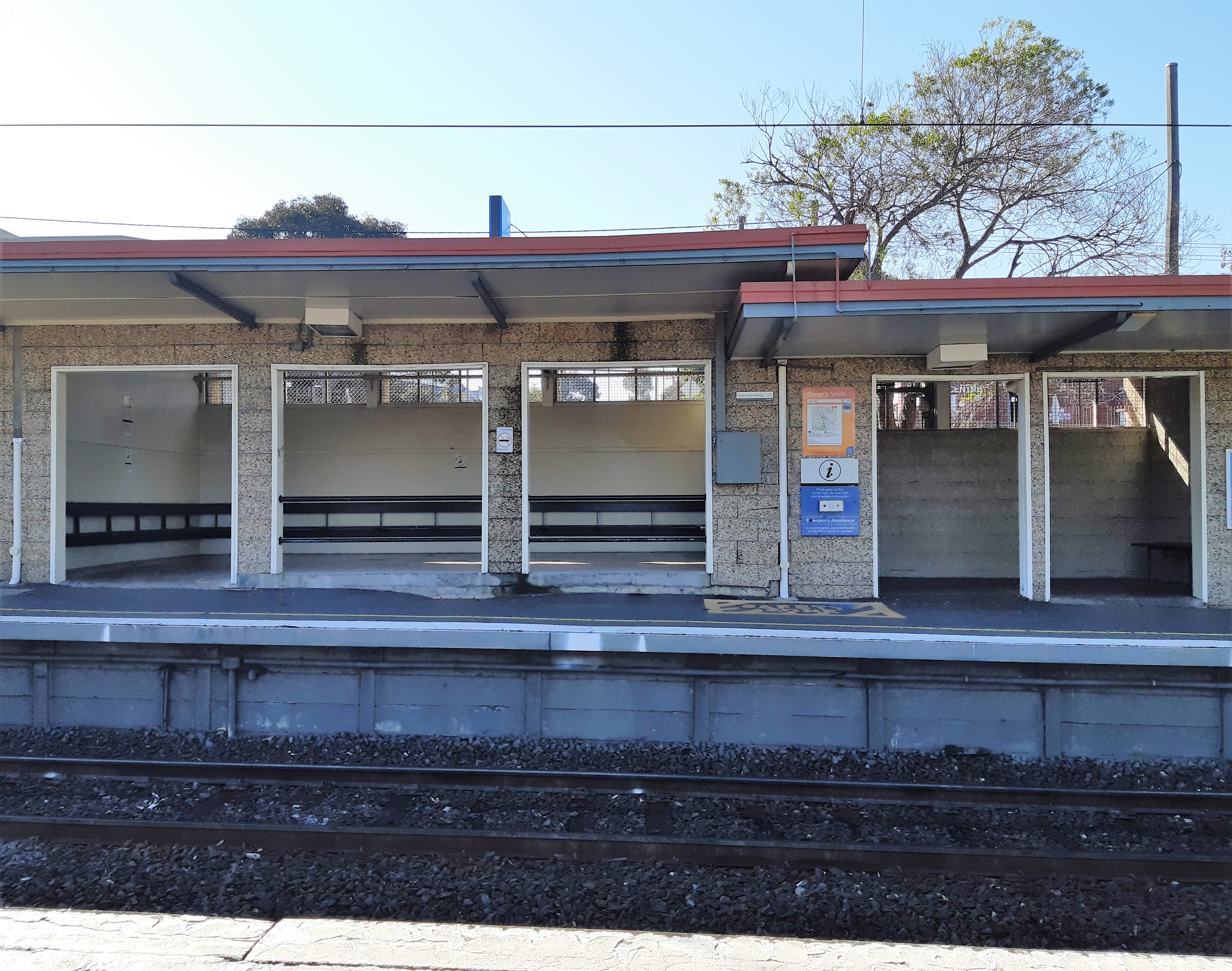
Station building on Platform 1, May 2019

Oak Park station opened on 13 August 1956, with the railway line past the site of the station originally opening in 1872, as part of the North East line to School House Lane. Like the suburb itself, the station was named after a property that was renamed after it was purchased from the widow of John Pascoe Fawkner in 1879. Fawkner originally purchased 316 hectares of land, including the area now known as Oak Park, in 1839.

In 1962, boom barriers replaced hand-operated gates at the Devon Road level crossing, located nearby in the up direction of the station. In 1965, a number of signals at the station were abolished, in conjunction with the replacement of double line block signalling with three-position signalling between Broadmeadows and Essendon.

In 1989, the station was damaged by fire. In 1994, it was provided with CCTV.

== Platforms and services ==
Oak Park has two side platforms. It is served by Craigieburn line trains.

Oak Park platform arrangement
Platform	Line	Destination	Via	Service Type	Notes	Source
1	Craigieburn line	Flinders Street	City Loop	All stations	See City Loop for operating patterns	
2	Craigieburn line	Craigieburn		All stations		
