= Newmarket railway station, Melbourne =

Railway station in Melbourne, Australia

Newmarket
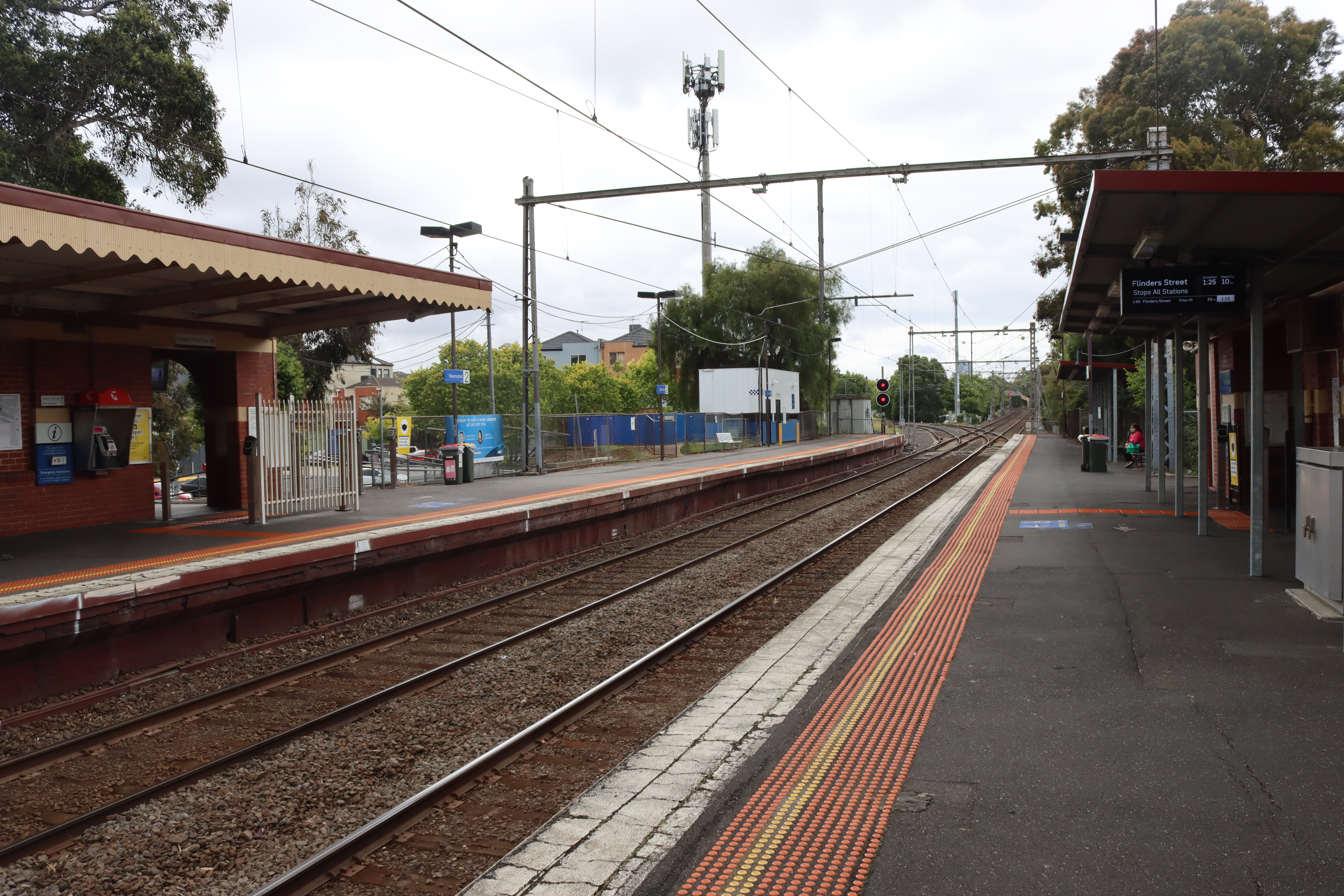
- Northbound view from Platform 1, December 2021

General information
- Location: Pin Oak Crescent, Flemington, Victoria 3031; City of Moonee Valley; Australia
- Coordinates: 37°47′14″S 144°55′44″E
- System: PTV commuter rail station
- Owner: VicTrack
- Operator: Metro Trains
- Line: Craigieburn
- Distance: 4.30 kilometres from Southern Cross
- Platforms: 2 side
- Tracks: 2
- Connections: Tram

Construction
- Structure type: Ground
- Cycle facilities: Yes
- Accessible: No – steep ramp

Other information
- Status: Operational, host station
- Station code: NKT
- Fare zone: Myki zone 1
- Website: Public Transport Victoria

History
- Opened: 1 November 1860; 166 years ago
- Closed: 1 July 1864
- Rebuilt: 9 October 1871
- Electrified: May 1919 (1500 V DC overhead)

Passengers
2005–2018 numbers
2005–2006	634,775
2006–2007	702,528 ▲10.67%
2007–2008	772,748 ▲9.99%
2008–2009	854,899 ▲10.63%
2009–2010	839,559 ▼1.79%
2010–2011	849,886 ▲1.23%
2011–2012	785,223 ▼7.61%
2012–2013	Not measured
2013–2014	854,579 ▲8.83%
2014–2015	840,857 ▼1.6%
2015–2016	814,041 ▼3.18%
2016–2017	903,968 ▲11.05%
2017–2018	913,241 ▲1.02%
- 2018–2019: 893,850 ▼2.12%
- 2019–2020: 675,600 ▼24.4%
- 2020–2021: 302,600 ▼55.2%
- 2021–2022: 339,600 ▲12.22%
- 2022–2023: 496,250 ▲46.13%
- 2023–2024: 598,050 ▲20.51%

Services
Preceding station	Metro Trains	Following station
Kensington towards Flinders Street	Craigieburn line	Ascot Vale towards Craigieburn
Flemington Racecourse line does not stop here
Track layout
Location

Newmarket station is a railway station operated by Metro Trains Melbourne on the Craigieburn line, part of the Melbourne rail network. It serves the northern suburb of Flemington in Melbourne, Victoria, Australia.

Newmarket station is an elevated host station, featuring two side platforms. It opened on 1 November 1860, with the current station provided in 1871. The station originally closed on 1 July 1864, but was later reopened on 9 October 1871.

Special services to Flemington Racecourse and Showgrounds pass through the station, but do not stop, with signs on Platform 2 advising passengers of this. The junction for the Flemington Racecourse line is located immediately north of the station.

== History ==
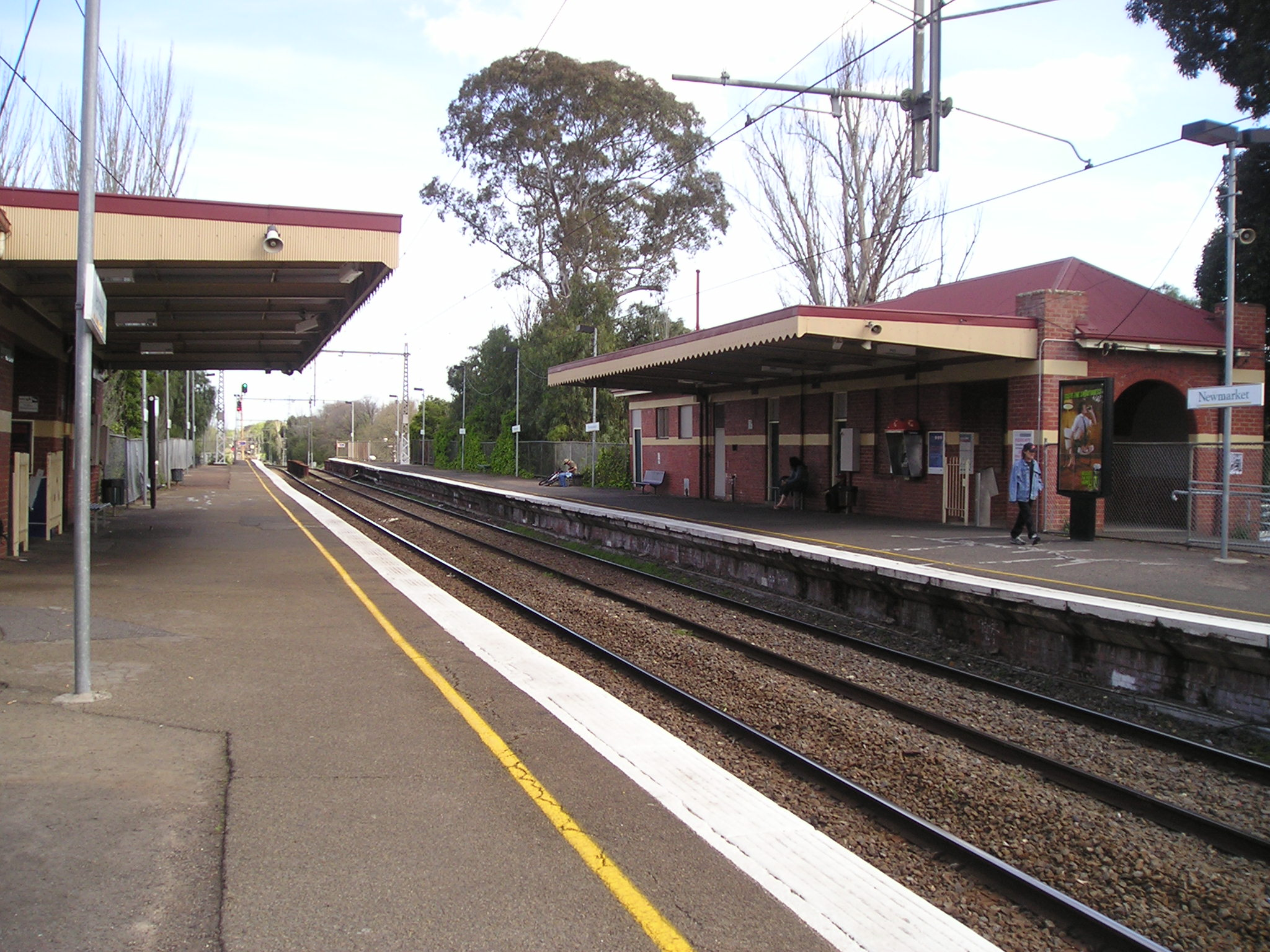
Southbound view from Platform 1, October 2005

Newmarket station opened on 1 November 1860, just over a week after the railway line to Essendon opened as part of the private Melbourne and Essendon Railway Company. The station closed with the line on 1 July 1864, but was reopened on 9 October 1871, under government ownership. The name of the station comes from the fact that land was granted in 1858 for the establishment of the Newmarket Saleyards and the Melbourne City Abattoir. Both the abattoir and saleyards opened in 1861, with livestock relocating from the "old market" on the corner of Elizabeth and Victoria Streets, near the Melbourne CBD.

In 1886, a permanent station building was built and, in 1925, the present buildings were provided. In 1880, interlocking and a signal box, for the Flemington Racecourse line junction, were brought into use and, in 1969, became remotely controlled from Kensington.

During April and May 1994, the timber decking across Racecourse Road was replaced, with the tracks laid on concrete, and new concrete abutments on both sides of the bridge being laid. The current bridge over Racecourse Road is the third bridge on site.

During construction of CityLink in 1997–1998, the station was used for passengers to shuttle to and from Flemington Bridge on the Upfield line, due to services not operating between Flemington Bridge and North Melbourne, and the temporary closure of Macaulay. This was to allow elevated roads, linking the West Gate and Tullamarine Freeways, to be constructed.

On 4 May 2010, as part of the 2010/2011 State Budget, $83.7 million was allocated to upgrade Newmarket to a premium station, along with nineteen others. However, in March 2011, this was scrapped by the Baillieu Government.

In 2014, it became obvious that structural problems were affecting the building on Platform 1, which is elevated and on concrete piers, on which cracks and concrete cancer were evident. The retaining wall at the back of the platform was also exhibiting extensive concrete cancer. Metal props were inserted to shore up the piers, and the cantilevered awning over the platform was demolished, and replaced by a temporary timber structure. Half of the large ramp from street level to the station entrance was removed, partly to allow three steel straps to be bolted to the outside of the building, to support the wall. Parts of the building were eventually demolished in that year.

== Platforms and services ==
Newmarket has two side platforms. It is serviced by Metro Trains' Craigieburn line services.

Newmarket platform arrangement
Platform	Line	Destination	Via	Service Type	Notes	Source
1	Craigieburn line	Flinders Street	City Loop	All stations	See City Loop for operating patterns	
2	Craigieburn line	Craigieburn		All stations		

== Transport links ==
One tram route operates via Newmarket station:

- : West Maribyrnong – Flinders Street station (via Elizabeth Street) (operated by Yarra Trams)
