= Craigieburn line =

Passenger rail service in metropolitan Melbourne, Victoria, Australia

Craigieburn

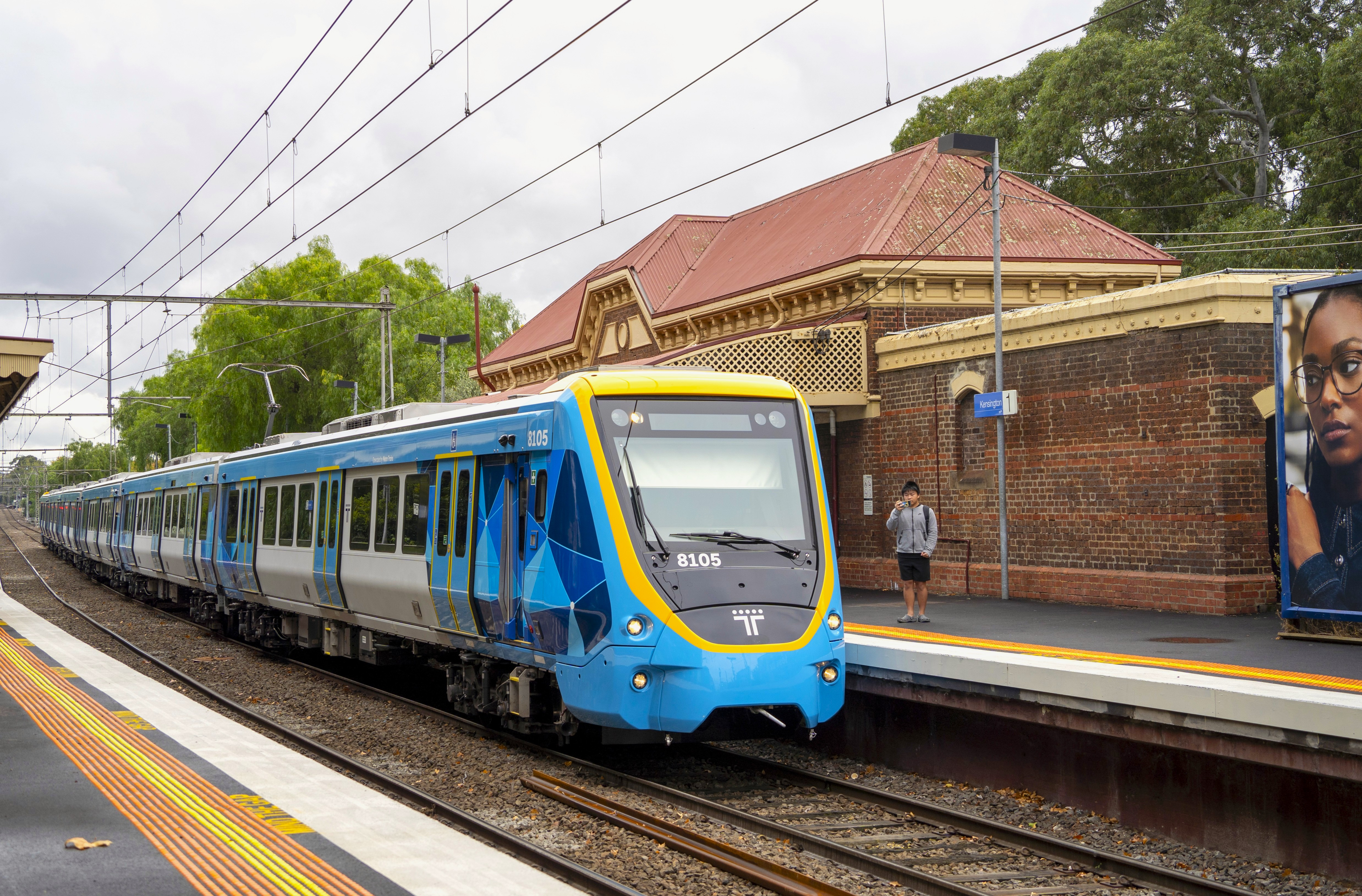
- An X'Trapolis 2.0 train at Kensington station, May 2026

Overview
- Service type: Commuter rail
- System: Melbourne railway network
- Status: Operational
- Locale: Melbourne, Victoria, Australia
- Predecessor: Essendon (1860–1864); Essendon (1871–1872); Seymour (1872–2007); Essendon ^ (1919–1921); Broadmeadows ^ (1921–2007)^ are electric services
- First service: 21 October 1860; 166 years ago
- Current operator: Metro Trains
- Former operators: M&ER (1860–1864); Victorian Railways (VR) (1871–1974); VR as VicRail (1974–1983); MTA (The Met) (1983–1989); PTC (The Met) (1989–1998); Bayside Trains (1998–2000); M>Train (2000–2004); Connex Melbourne (2004–2009)

Route
- Termini: Flinders Street; Craigieburn
- Stops: 21 (including City Loop stations)
- Distance travelled: 27.0 km (16.8 mi)
- Average journey time: 44 minutes (not via City Loop)
- Service frequency: 5–20 minutes weekdays peak; 20 minutes weekdays off-peak; 20 minutes weekend daytime; 30 minutes nights; 60 minutes early weekend mornings
- Line used: Albury

Technical
- Rolling stock: Comeng, Siemens, X'Trapolis 2.0
- Track gauge: 1,600 mm (5 ft 3 in)
- Electrification: 1500 V DC overhead
- Track owner: VicTrack

The Craigieburn line is a commuter railway line in the city of Melbourne, Victoria, Australia. Operated by Metro Trains Melbourne, it is the city's seventh shortest metropolitan railway line at 27.0 kilometres (16.8 mi). The line runs from Flinders Street station in central Melbourne to Craigieburn station in the north, serving 21 stations via North Melbourne, Essendon, and Broadmeadows. The line operates for approximately 19 hours a day (from approximately 5:00 am to around 12:00 am) with 24 hour service available on Friday and Saturday nights. During peak hour, headways of up to 5 minutes are operated with services every 20–30 minutes during off-peak hours. Trains on the Craigieburn line run with a two three-car formations of Comeng, Siemens Nexas or X'Trapolis 2.0 trainsets.

Services on the line began from North Melbourne to Essendon by the Melbourne & Essendon Railway Company in November 1860. It was closed shortly after, however, the Victorian Railways reopened the Flemington Racecourse line (including the Essendon line as far as Newmarket) in November 1867, and in January 1871, to Essendon. The line was progressively electrified and, in 1921, the line was electrified to Broadmeadows, where it remained until the extension of electrification in 2007.

Since the 2000s, due to the heavily utilised infrastructure of the Craigieburn line, improvements and upgrades have been made. Works have included replacing sleepers, upgrading signalling technology, the extension of the line to Craigieburn, the construction of new stations, the removal of level crossings, the introduction of new rolling stock, and station accessibility upgrades.

== History ==
=== 19th century ===
The line from North Melbourne to Essendon was opened by the Melbourne & Essendon Railway Company in November 1860. Soon after, the company opened a branch from Newmarket to Flemington Racecourse. Both lines were closed shortly after, in July 1864. The Victorian Railways reopened the Flemington Racecourse line (including the Essendon line as far as Newmarket) in November 1867, and in January 1871, to Essendon. In April 1872, the line was extended to a temporary terminus outside Seymour, awaiting completion of a bridge over the Goulburn River. In December 1894, through services were provided from Essendon to Brighton Beach on the Sandringham line.

=== 20th century ===
Automatic Block Signalling was introduced on the line in 1918, with Kensington to Essendon being converted in June of that year, and North Melbourne to Kensington in October. In May 1919, Flinders Street to Essendon and the Sandringham line were the first lines to be electrified in Melbourne, apart from a test installation on the Flemington Racecourse line. In 1921, the line was electrified to Broadmeadows, where it remained until the extension of electrification in 2007.

In January 1924, an extra pair of tracks, including a flying junction, opened between North Melbourne and Kensington, enabling the separation of passenger and goods traffic in the busy section. Further works were carried out in 1929, when the double tracked Albion–Jacana freight line opened, permitting freight trains to avoid the line via Essendon.

A branch line was opened during the Second World War to Broadstore, designed to connect Broadmeadows station with the Maygar Barracks. The line opened on 12 October 1942 and remaining in operation until 1982, when usage of the base began to cease.

Automatic Block Signalling was extended to Broadmeadows in November 1965.

=== 21st century ===
In 2003, an unmanned suburban train rolled the length of the line from Broadmeadows station for nearly 17 kilometres (11 mi), eventually crashing into another stationary train at Spencer Street station (now Southern Cross station). 11 people sustained minor injuries, however, nobody was seriously injured or killed from the accident.

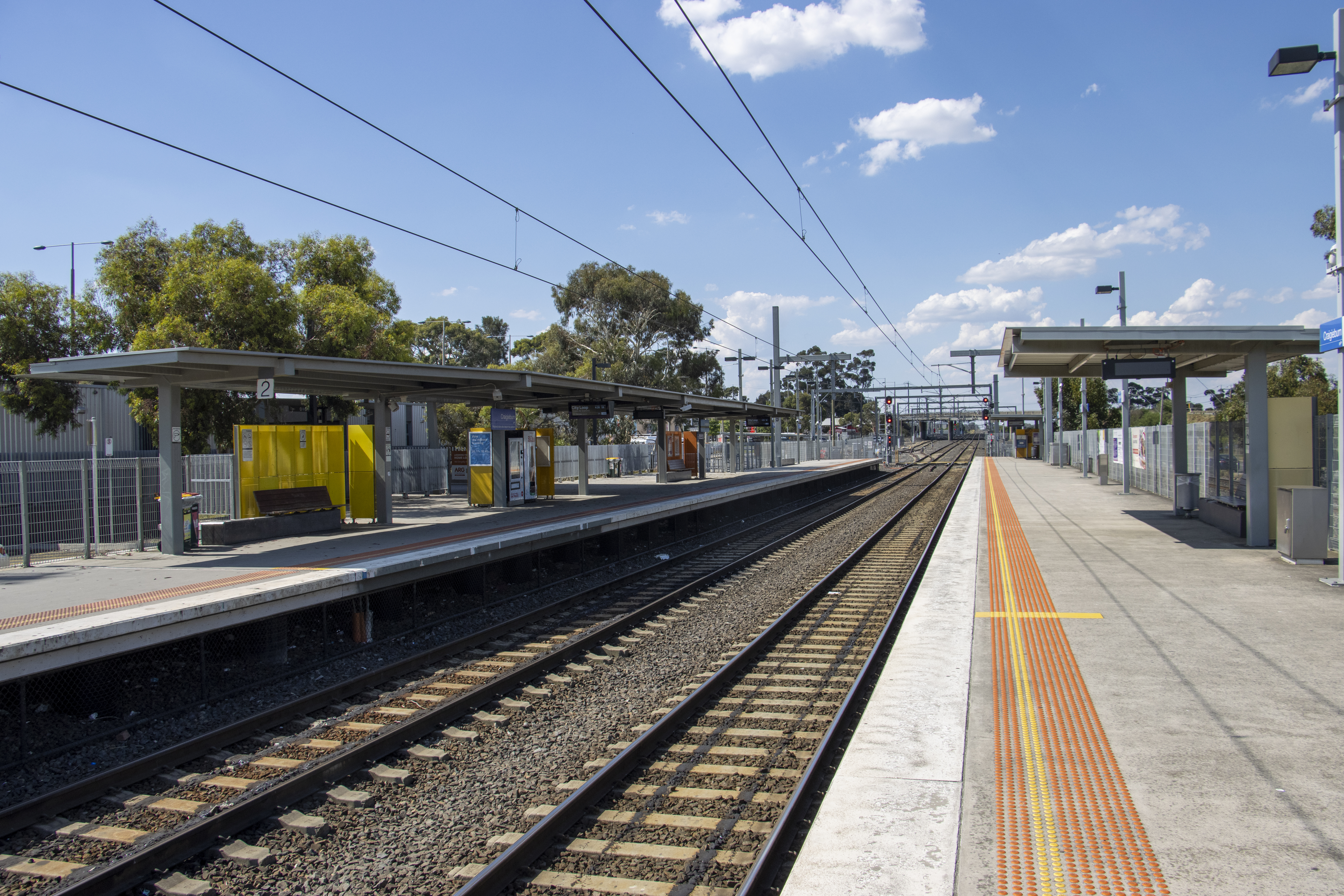
Craigieburn station was rebuilt as part of the extension.

On 30 September 2007, electrification of the Broadmeadows line was extended along the regional V/Line tracks to Craigieburn. The Craigieburn rail project delivered projects including:

- Upgrading Craigieburn station to premium station status
- A new station at Roxburgh Park
- New train stabling facilities at Craigieburn
- Construction of overhead wiring system with new sub-stations
- Installation of new signalling systems along the Broadmeadows—Craigieburn corridor
- The provision for a new station at Coolaroo (this ended up being built under another government)

The Craigieburn Rail project started construction in May 2005 and was completed in late September 2007. An additional set of projects were delivered later on, with a new station at Coolaroo opened in 2010 and the construction of a fully-fledged train maintenance facility under the Brumby government.

On 9 April 2012, a train maintenance facility, located north of the station, was opened by then Minister for Public Transport, Terry Mulder.

In 2026, the Craigieburn Train Maintenance Facility was upgraded to accommodate the housing of the X'Trapolis 2.0 trains. The upgrades included more space accommodated for the X'Trapolis 2.0 trains, extended maintenance pits, new roof platforms and improved train maintenance activities.

In May 2026, the X'Trapolis 2.0 trains was introduced to the Craigieburn line to replace the existing ageing Comeng fleet, which currently serves the Craigieburn line.

=== Level Crossing Removals ===
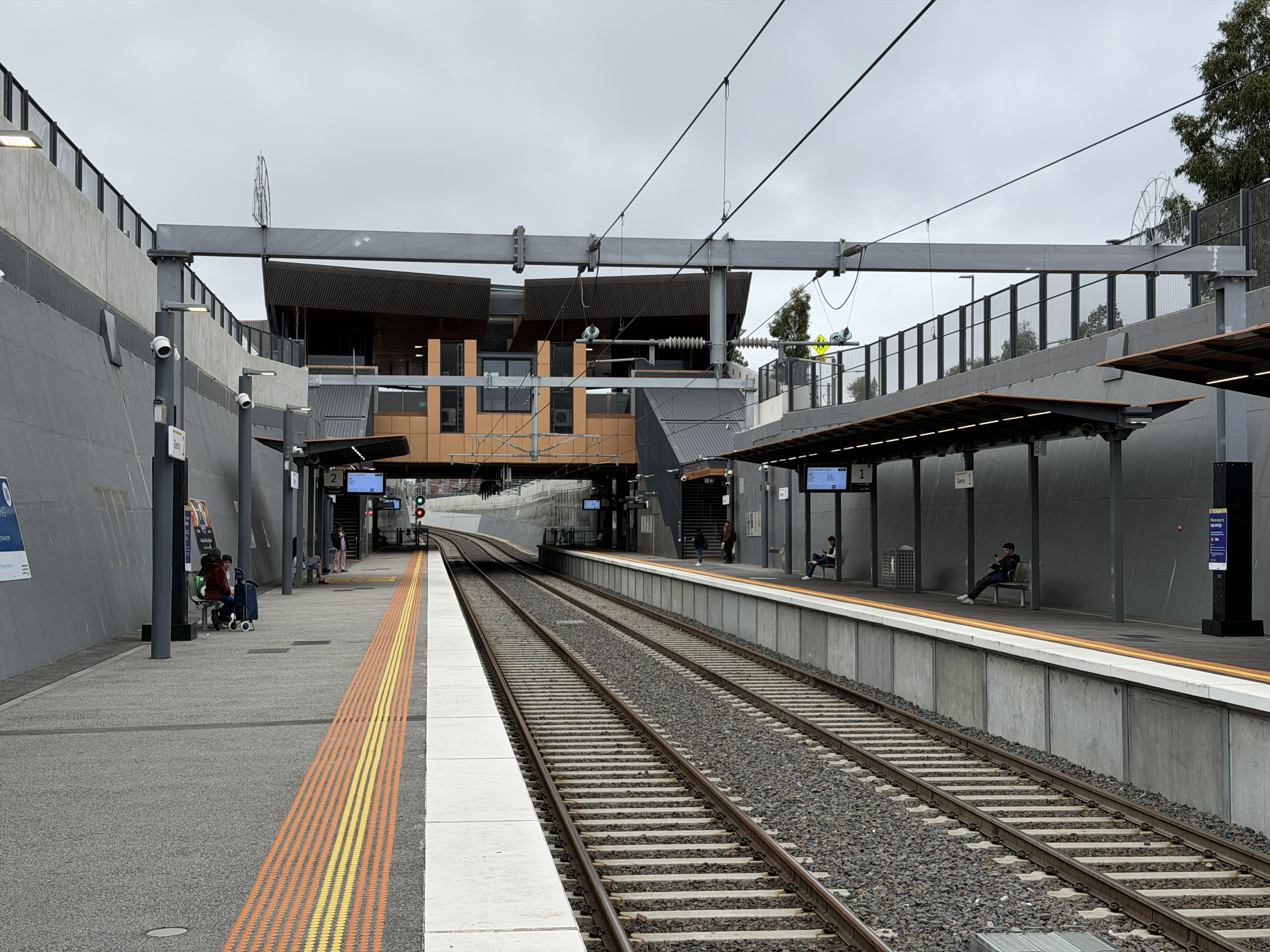
Glenroy station was rebuilt as part of the adjacent level crossing removal.

The Level Crossing Removal Project announced the removal of 2 level crossings on the line, which were completed in stages between 2018 and 2022. In 2018, one level crossing was removed at Buckley Street, Essendon. The crossing was removed by lowering the road line underneath the rail line. The second crossing to be removed was the one at Glenroy Road, Glenroy, by lowering the rail line underneath the road. In addition, Glenroy station was rebuilt with a modern, wheelchair accessible, lowered design. As a result of these removals, the Craigieburn line now has a number of remaining crossings on the corridor that have not been slated for removal since the project's announcement.

== Future ==
=== Wallan extension ===
Highlighted in the 2018 Victorian Rail Plan, a proposal exists for the Craigieburn line to be connected to the Upfield line, via the construction of a rail link along the Somerton rail corridor. In addition, the Upfield line would be extended to Wallan. The 2018 Victorian Rail Plan has proposed the following projects take place as part of the Wallan extension:

Stage	Project	Notes
Stage 2 (Metro Tunnel Day One)	Rerouting of Seymour and Shepparton services via the Upfield line instead of the Craigieburn line	This project was meant to be completed by the opening of the Metro Tunnel in 2025, however, there has not been any recent progress and this has not happened.
Stage 3	Somerton to Craigieburn quadruplication	No recent progress.
Stage 4	Extension of the Upfield line to Wallan: Electrifying the Somerton link; Electrifying the regional track between Craigieburn and Wallan; Upgrading Wallan and Donnybrook stations; Constructing a new station at Lockerbie; Reopening Beveridge station	The Craigieburn line would remain terminating at Craigieburn station, with the Upfield line continuing past Craigieburn, stopping at 3 other stations before terminating at Wallan. There has not been any recent progress.

In 2018, the government announced that a business case would be completed for to further investigate the positivity for these series of projects to commence. A business case was completed, however, it was not released to the public. Since the business case in 2018, there has been little developments despite the 'Metro Tunnel Day One' milestone of the 2018 Plan fast approaching. Only a small amount of attention has been given by local residents, council, an action group and some political parties.

== Network and operations ==
=== Services ===
Services on the Craigieburn line operates from approximately 5:00 am to around 12:00 daily. In general, during peak hours, train frequency is 5–10 minutes in the AM peak on the Craigieburn line while during non-peak hours the frequency is reduced to 20–30 minutes throughout the entire route. On Friday nights and weekends, services run 24 hours a day, with 60 minute frequencies available outside of normal operating hours.

Train services on the Craigieburn line are also subjected to maintenance and renewal works, usually on selected Fridays and Saturdays. Shuttle bus services are provided throughout the duration of works for affected commuters.

==== Stopping patterns ====
Legend — Station status

- ◼ Premium Station – Station staffed from first to last train
- ◻ Host Station – Usually staffed during morning peak, however this can vary for different stations on the network.

Legend — Stopping patterns
Some services do not operate via the City Loop

- ● – All trains stop
- ◐ – Some services do not stop
- ▼ – Only outbound trains stop
- | – Trains pass and do not stop

Craigieburn Services
Station	Zone	Local	Broadmeadows
◼ Flagstaff	1	◐	▼
◼ Melbourne Central	1	◐	▼
◼ Parliament	1	◐	▼
◼ Flinders Street	1	●	●
◼ Southern Cross	1	◐	●
◼ North Melbourne	1	●	●
Kensington	1	●	◐
◻ Newmarket	1	●	◐
◻ Ascot Vale	1	●	◐
◻ Moonee Ponds	1	●	◐
◼ Essendon	1	●	●
Glenbervie	1	●	●
Strathmore	1	●	●
Pascoe Vale	1/2	●	●
Oak Park	1/2	●	●
◼ Glenroy	1/2	●	●
Jacana	2	●	●
◼ Broadmeadows	2	●	●
Coolaroo	2	●	
Roxburgh Park	2	●	
◼ Craigieburn	2	●	

=== Operators ===
The Craigieburn line has had a total of 8 operators since its opening in 1860. The majority of operations throughout its history have been government run: from the acquisition of the service from private operator the Melbourne and Essendon Railway Company in 1871 until the 1999 privatisation of Melbourne's rail network, four different government operators have run the line. These operators, Victorian Railways, the Metropolitan Transit Authority, the Public Transport Corporation, and Bayside Trains have a combined operational length of 129 years.

Bayside Trains was privatised in August 1998 and later rebranded M>Train. In 2002, M>Train was placed into receivership and the state government regained ownership of the line, with KPMG appointed as receivers to operate M>Train on behalf of the state government. Two years later, rival train operator Connex Melbourne took over the M>Train operations including the Frankston line. Metro Trains Melbourne, the current private operator, then took over the operations in 2009. The private operators have had a combined operational period of 32 years.

Past and present operators of the Craigieburn line:
Operator	Assumed operations	Ceased operations	Length of operations
Melbourne and Essendon Railway Company	1860	1864	4 years
Victorian Railways	1871	1983	112 years
Metropolitan Transit Authority	1983	1989	6 years
Public Transport Corporation	1989	1998	9 years
Bayside Trains (government operator)	1998	2000	2 years
M>Train	2000	2004	4 years
Connex Melbourne	2004	2009	5 years
Metro Trains Melbourne	2009	incumbent	16 years (ongoing)

=== Route ===
Interactive map of the Craigieburn line in northern Melbourne.

The Craigieburn line forms a somewhat linear route from the Melbourne central business district to its terminus in Craigieburn. The route is 27.0 kilometres (16.8 mi) long and is fully double tracked. The only underground section of the Craigieburn line is in the City Loop, where the service stops at 3 underground stations. Exiting the city, the line steadily rises after leaving North Melbourne until after Essendon, when it then drops slightly to cross Moonee Ponds Creek. Soon after the line encounters the Glenroy Bank, a continuous rising gradient of 1 in 50 for almost 3 kilometres (1.9 mi). After Glenroy, it continues to rise to the end of the suburban line (and beyond). Some sections of the line has been elevated or lowered into a cutting to eliminate level crossings. Despite some removals, there are a number of level crossings still present with no current plans to remove them.

The line follows the same alignment as multiple lines with the Craigieburn line splitting off at North Melbourne. The Craigieburn line continues on its north western alignment, whereas the other lines continue onto a northern, western, or south-western alignment. Most of the rail line goes through built-up suburbs and some industrial areas.

=== Stations ===
The line serves 21 stations across 27.0 kilometres (16.8 mi) of track. The stations are a mix of elevated, lowered, underground, and ground level designs. Underground stations are present only in the City Loop, with the majority of elevated and lowered stations being constructed as part of level crossing removals.

Station	Image	Accessibility	Opened	Terrain	Train connections	Other connections
Flinders Street		Yes—step free access	1854	Lowered	13 connections: * Alamein line; Belgrave line; Flemington Racecourse line; Frankston line; Gippsland line; Glen Waverley line; Hurstbridge line; Lilydale line; Mernda line; Sandringham line; Upfield line; Werribee line; Williamstown line	Trams Buses
Southern Cross		Yes—step free access	1859	Ground level	25 connections: * Alamein line; Albury line; Ararat line; Ballarat line; Belgrave line; Bendigo line; Echuca line; Flemington Racecourse line; Frankston line; Geelong line; Gippsland line; Glen Waverley line; Hurstbridge line; Lilydale line; Maryborough line; Mernda line; NSW TrainLink Southern; Seymour line; Shepparton line; Swan Hill line; The Overland; Upfield line; Warrnambool line; Werribee line; Williamstown line	Trams Buses Coaches SkyBus
Parliament		Yes—step free access	1983	Underground	8 connections: * Alamein line; Belgrave line; Frankston line; Glen Waverley line; Hurstbridge line; Lilydale line; Mernda line; Upfield line	Trams
Melbourne Central		Yes—step free access	1981	Underground	8 connections: * Alamein line; Belgrave line; Frankston line; Glen Waverley line; Hurstbridge line; Lilydale line; Mernda line; Upfield line	Trams Buses
Flagstaff		Yes—step free access	1985	Underground	8 connections: * Alamein line; Belgrave line; Frankston line; Glen Waverley line; Hurstbridge line; Lilydale line; Mernda line; Upfield line	Trams
North Melbourne		Yes—step free access	1859	Ground level	7 connections: * Flemington Racecourse line; Seymour line; Shepparton line; Upfield line; Werribee line; Williamstown line	Buses
Kensington		No—steep ramp	1860	Ground level		Buses
Newmarket		No—steep ramp	1860	Ground level		Trams
Ascot Vale		No—steep ramp	1860	Ground level		Trams Buses
Moonee Ponds		No—steep ramp	1860	Ground level		Trams Buses
Essendon		No—steep ramp	1860	Ground level	2 connections: Seymour line; Shepparton line	Trams Buses
Glenbervie		No—steep ramp	1922	Ground level		Buses
Strathmore		No—steep ramp	1890	Ground level		Buses
Pascoe Vale		Yes—step free access	1885	Ground level		Buses
Oak Park		No—steep ramp	1956	Ground level		
Glenroy		Yes—step free access	1887	Lowered		Buses
Jacana		No—steep ramp	1959	Ground level		
Broadmeadows		Yes—step free access	1873	Ground level	4 connections: Albury line; NSW TrainLink Southern; Seymour line; Shepparton line	Buses
Coolaroo		Yes—step free access	2010	Ground level		Buses
Roxburgh Park		Yes—step free access	2007	Ground level		Buses
Craigieburn		Yes—step free access	1872	Ground level	2 connections: Seymour line; Shepparton line	Buses

Station histories
Station	Opened	Closed	Age	Notes
Flagstaff	27 May 1985		41 years	
Melbourne Central	26 January 1981		45 years	Formerly Museum
Parliament	22 January 1983		43 years	
Flinders Street	12 September 1854		172 years	Formerly Melbourne Terminus
Southern Cross	17 January 1859		167 years	Formerly Batman's Hill; Formerly Spencer Street
North Melbourne	6 October 1859		167 years	
Kensington	1 November 1860	1 July 1864	3 years	Melbourne and Essendon Railway Company
Kensington	9 October 1871		155 years	
Newmarket	1 November 1860	1 July 1864	3 years	Melbourne and Essendon Railway Company
Newmarket	9 October 1871		155 years	
Ascot Vale	1 November 1860	1 July 1864	3 years	Melbourne and Essendon Railway Company
Ascot Vale	9 October 1871		155 years	
Moonee Ponds	1 November 1860	1 July 1864	3 years	Melbourne and Essendon Railway Company
Moonee Ponds	9 October 1871		155 years	
Essendon	1 November 1860	1 July 1864	3 years	Melbourne and Essendon Railway Company
Essendon	9 October 1871		155 years	
Glenbervie	11 September 1922		104 years	
Strathmore	28 October 1890		136 years	Formerly North Essendon
Pascoe Vale	10 November 1885		140 years	
Oak Park	13 August 1956		70 years	Formerly Gowanbrae
Glenroy	24 January 1887		139 years	
Jacana	15 February 1959		67 years	
Broadmeadows	1 February 1873		153 years	
Coolaroo	6 June 2010		16 years	
Roxburgh Park	18 April 1872	24 September 1963	91 years	Was originally Somerton
Roxburgh Park	1 October 2007		19 years	Reopened as Roxburgh Park
Craigieburn	18 April 1872		154 years	

== Infrastructure ==
=== Rolling stock ===
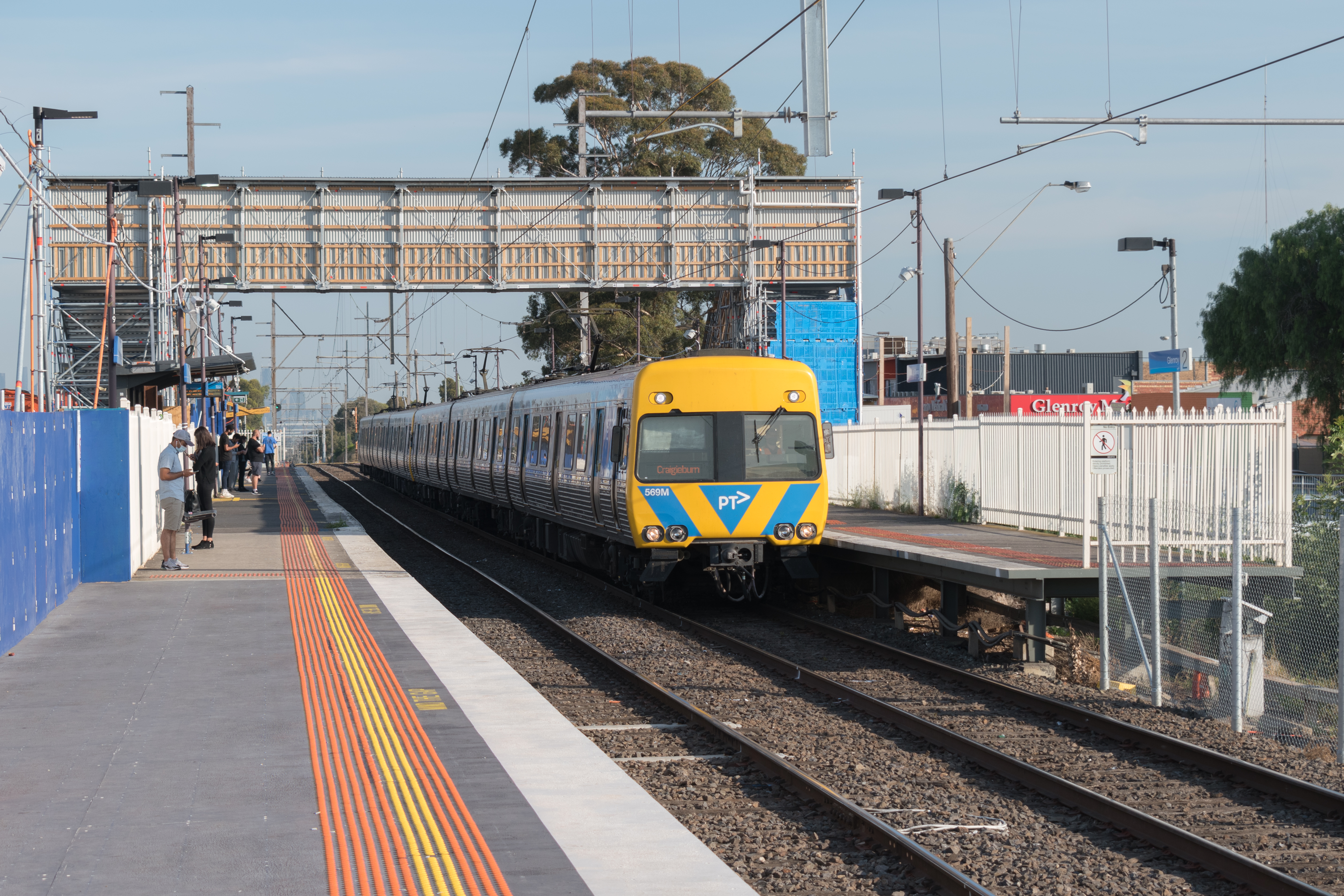
A Comeng EMU at the old Glenroy station prior to its 2022 rebuild.

The Craigieburn line uses two different types of electric multiple unit (EMU) trains that are operated in a split six-car configuration. The primary rolling stock featured on the line is the Comeng EMUs, built by Commonwealth Engineering between 1981 and 1988. These train sets are the oldest on the Melbourne rail network and subsequently will be replaced by the mid 2030s. The second type of rolling stock is the Siemens Nexas EMUs which are also widely featured on the line, originally built between 2002 and 2005, these train sets feature more modern technology than the Comeng trains.

The X'Trapolis 2.0 EMUs, built from 2024 onwards are starting to roll out on the Craigieburn line to replace the existing ageing Comeng fleet and started entering service on the Craigieburn line in May 2026. The X'Trapolis 2.0 trains are fixed 6 car sets with fully walk through carriages and are new, modern and technologically advanced. The features of the X'Trapolis 2.0 trains include wide and modernised doors to reduce the boarding times at stations to under 40 seconds, Passenger information systems to display the train's journey in real time, higher energy efficiency to work with a lower network voltage, to fit in with modern rail systems overseas, designated bicycle storage areas and passenger operated automatic wheelchair ramps located behind the drivers cabs.

Alongside the passenger trains, Craigieburn line tracks and equipment are maintained by a fleet of engineering trains. The four types of engineering trains are: the shunting train; designed for moving trains along non-electrified corridors and for transporting other maintenance locomotives, for track evaluation; designed for evaluating track and its condition, the overhead inspection train; designed for overhead wiring inspection, and the infrastructure evaluation carriage designed for general infrastructure evaluation. Most of these trains are repurposed locomotives previously used by V/Line, Metro Trains, and the Southern Shorthaul Railroad.

=== Accessibility ===
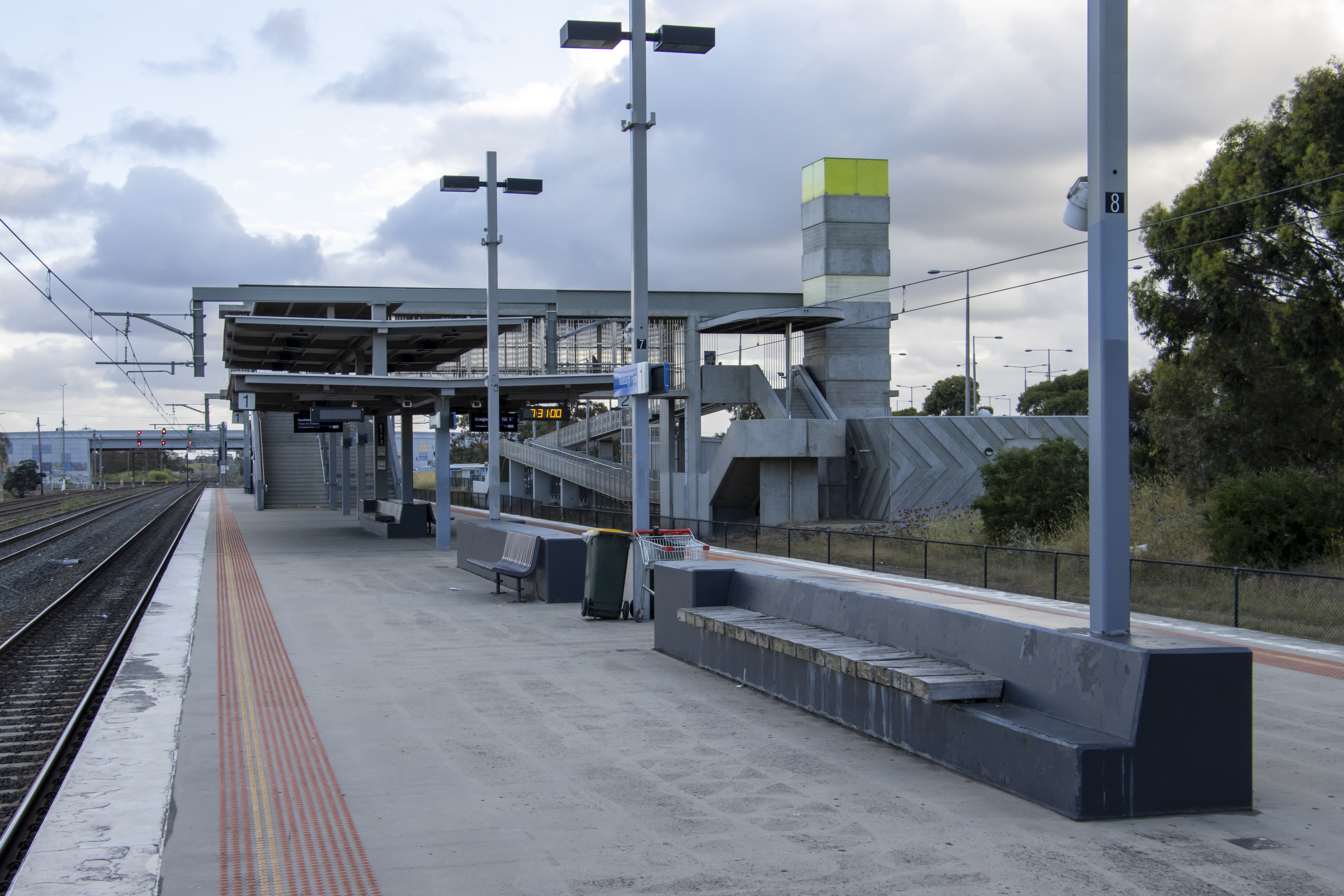
Roxburgh Park station features accessible elevators and ramps.

In compliance with the Disability Discrimination Act of 1992, all stations that are new-built or rebuilt are fully accessible and comply with these guidelines. Just over half of the stations on the corridor are fully accessible, however, there are some stations that haven't been upgraded to meet these guidelines. These stations do feature ramps, however, they have a gradient greater than 1 in 14. Stations that are fully accessible feature ramps that have a gradient less than 1 in 14, have at-grade paths, or feature lifts. These stations typically also feature tactile boarding indicators, independent boarding ramps, wheelchair accessible myki barriers, hearing loops, and widened paths.

Projects improving station accessibility have included the Level Crossing Removal Project, which involves station rebuilds and upgrades, and individual station upgrade projects. These works have made significant strides in improving network accessibility, with more than 57% of Craigieburn line stations classed as fully accessible. Future station upgrade projects will continue to increase the number of fully accessible stations over time.

=== Signalling ===
The Craigieburn line uses three position signalling which is widely used across the Melbourne train network. Three position signalling was first introduced in 1918, with the final section of the line converted to the new type of signalling in 2007.
