= Ascot Vale railway station =

Railway station in Melbourne, Australia

Ascot Vale
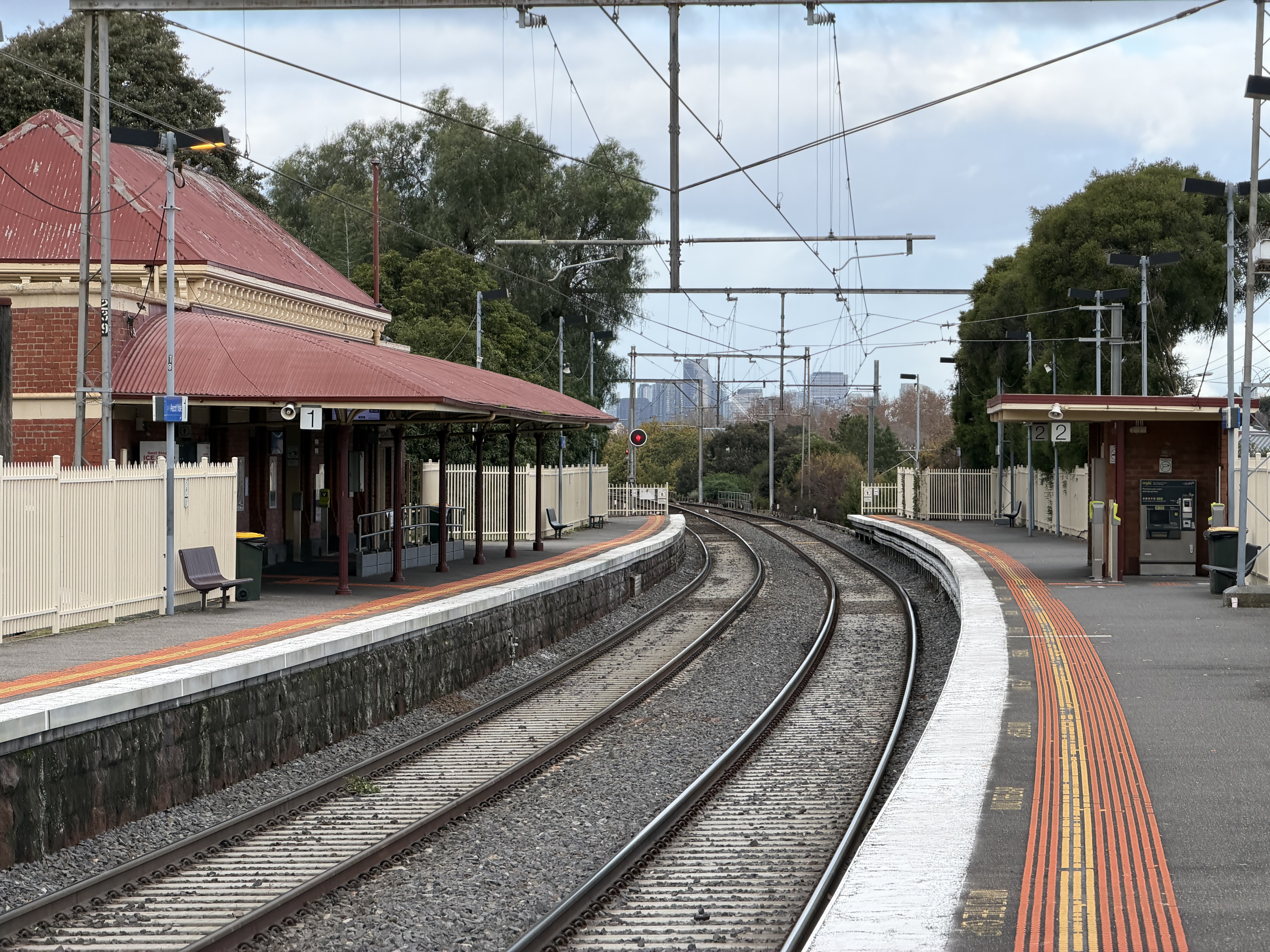
- Southbound view from Platform 2, July 2026

General information
- Location: The Crescent, Ascot Vale, Victoria 3032; City of Moonee Valley; Australia
- Coordinates: 37°46′31″S 144°55′19″E
- System: PTV commuter rail station
- Owner: VicTrack
- Operator: Metro Trains
- Line: Craigieburn
- Distance: 5.81 kilometres from Southern Cross
- Platforms: 2 side
- Tracks: 2
- Connections: Bus; Tram

Construction
- Structure type: Ground
- Parking: Yes
- Accessible: No – steep ramp

Other information
- Status: Operational, host station
- Station code: ASV
- Fare zone: Myki zone 1
- Website: Public Transport Victoria

History
- Opened: 1 November 1860; 165 years ago
- Closed: 1 July 1864
- Rebuilt: 9 October 1871
- Electrified: May 1919 (1500 V DC overhead)

Passengers
2005–2018 numbers
2005–2006	444,804
2006–2007	474,958 ▲6.77%
2007–2008	519,740 ▲9.42%
2008–2009	570,532 ▲9.77%
2009–2010	587,112 ▲2.9%
2010–2011	548,968 ▼6.5%
2011–2012	544,282 ▼0.85%
2012–2013	Not measured
2013–2014	556,453 ▲2.23%
2014–2015	556,387 ▼0.01%
2015–2016	602,822 ▲8.34%
2016–2017	621,809 ▲3.15%
2017–2018	630,411 ▲1.38%
- 2018–2019: 594,300 ▼5.73%
- 2019–2020: 488,800 ▼17.75%
- 2020–2021: 202,200 ▼58.7%
- 2021–2022: 241,200 ▲19.28%
- 2022–2023: 383,400 ▲58.96%
- 2023–2024: 474,300 ▲23.71%
- 2024–2025: 491,400 ▲3.61%

Services
Preceding station	Metro Trains	Following station
Newmarket towards Flinders Street	Craigieburn line	Moonee Ponds towards Craigieburn
Track layout
Location

Ascot Vale station is a railway station operated by Metro Trains Melbourne on the Craigieburn line, part of the Melbourne rail network. It serves the northern suburb of Ascot Vale in Melbourne, Victoria, Australia. Ascot Vale station is a ground-level host station, featuring two side platforms. It opened on 1 November 1860, with the current station provided in 1871. The station originally closed on 1 July 1864, but was later reopened on 9 October 1871.

== History ==
Ascot Vale station opened on 1 November 1860, just over a week after the railway line to Essendon opened as part of the private Melbourne and Essendon Railway Company. The station closed with the line on 1 July 1864, but was reopened on 9 October 1871, under government ownership. Like the suburb itself, the station was named after Ascot Racecourse in England, given its proximity to Flemington Racecourse.

In 1882, a temporary station building was provided, after duplication of the line, with the present building on Platform 1 dating from 1889. A signal box was provided in the same year, but was closed with the abolition of mechanical signalling in 1918.

== Platforms and services ==
Ascot Vale has two side platforms. It is serviced by Metro Trains' Craigieburn line services.

Ascot Vale platform arrangement
Platform	Line	Destination	Via	Service Type	Notes	Source
1	Craigieburn line	Flinders Street	City Loop	All stations	See City Loop for operating patterns	
2	Craigieburn line	Craigieburn		All stations		

== Transport links ==
Two bus routes operate via Ascot Vale station, under contract to Public Transport Victoria:

- 404 : Footscray station – Moonee Ponds Junction (operated by Transit Systems Victoria)
- 472 : Williamstown – Moonee Ponds Junction (operated by Transit Systems Victoria)

One tram route operates via Ascot Vale station:

- : Moonee Ponds Junction – Footscray station (operated by Yarra Trams)
