= Moonee Ponds railway station =

Railway station in Melbourne, Australia

Moonee Ponds
- Southbound view from Platform 2, September 2026

General information
- Location: Norwood Crescent, Moonee Ponds, Victoria 3039; City of Moonee Valley; Australia
- Coordinates: 37°45′57″S 144°55′10″E
- System: PTV commuter rail station
- Owner: VicTrack
- Operator: Metro Trains
- Line: Craigieburn
- Distance: 6.89 kilometres from Southern Cross
- Platforms: 2 side
- Tracks: 2
- Connections: Bus; Tram

Construction
- Structure type: Ground
- Parking: 107
- Cycle facilities: Yes
- Accessible: No – steep ramp

Other information
- Status: Operational, host station
- Station code: MPD
- Fare zone: Myki zone 1
- Website: Public Transport Victoria

History
- Opened: 1 November 1860; 165 years ago
- Closed: 1 July 1864
- Rebuilt: 9 October 1871
- Electrified: May 1919 (1500 V DC overhead)

Passengers
2005–2018 numbers
| 2005–2006 | 614,106 |
| 2006–2007 | 675,538 ▲10% |
| 2007–2008 | 817,206 ▲20.97% |
| 2008–2009 | 823,669 ▲0.79% |
| 2009–2010 | 852,833 ▲3.54% |
| 2010–2011 | 810,650 ▼4.95% |
| 2011–2012 | 812,272 ▲0.2% |
| 2012–2013 | Not measured |
| 2013–2014 | 782,344 ▼3.68% |
| 2014–2015 | 764,452 ▼2.28% |
| 2015–2016 | 853,784 ▲11.68% |
| 2016–2017 | 860,108 ▲0.74% |
| 2017–2018 | 861,193 ▲0.12% |
- 2018–2019: 858,700 ▼0.28%
- 2019–2020: 776,300 ▼9.6%
- 2020–2021: 362,450 ▼53.3%
- 2021–2022: 436,200 ▲20.34%
- 2022–2023: 648,000 ▲48.56%
- 2023–2024: 759,550 ▲17.21%

Services
| Preceding station | Metro Trains | Following station |
|---|---|---|
| Ascot Vale towards Flinders Street | Craigieburn line | Essendon towards Craigieburn |
Track layout
Location

Moonee Ponds station is a railway station operated by Metro Trains Melbourne on the Craigieburn line, part of the Melbourne rail network. It serves the northern suburb of Moonee Ponds in Melbourne, Victoria, Australia. Moonee Ponds station is a ground level host station, featuring two side platforms. It opened on 1 November 1860, with the current station provided in 1882. The station originally closed on 1 July 1864, but was later reopened on 9 October 1871.

== History ==
Moonee Ponds station opened on 1 November 1860, just over a week after the railway line opened as part of the private Melbourne and Essendon Railway Company line to Essendon. The station closed with the line on 1 July 1864, but was reopened on 9 October 1871, under government ownership. Like the suburb itself, the station is believed to have gotten its name from either the Moonee Ponds Creek, which resembled a chain of ponds in dry weather (the creek was noted as "Mone Mone Creek" in 1837 by government surveyor Robert Hoddle, during a survey of the area), an Indigenous Australian who was attached to the mounted police, or John Moonee, who had land near the present day Moonee Valley Racecourse.

In 1882, the station building on Platform 1 was provided, with a signal box provided in 1889 to control interlocked gates at the Puckle Street level crossing. In 1969, these gates were replaced with boom barriers.

On 4 May 2010, as part of the 2010/2011 State Budget, $83.7 million was allocated to upgrade Moonee Ponds to a premium station, along with nineteen others. However, in March 2011, this was scrapped by the Baillieu Government.

== Platforms and services ==
Moonee Ponds has two side platforms. It is serviced by Metro Trains' Craigieburn line services.

Moonee Ponds platform arrangement
| Platform | Line | Destination | Via | Service Type | Notes | Source |
|---|---|---|---|---|---|---|
| 1 | Craigieburn line | Flinders Street | City Loop | All stations | See City Loop for operating patterns | |
| 2 | Craigieburn line | Craigieburn | | All stations | | |

== Transport links ==
One bus route operates to and from Moonee Ponds station, under contract to Public Transport Victoria:

- 467 : to Aberfeldie (operated by CDC Melbourne)

Moonee Ponds Junction is located 400 metres east of the station, and is the terminus for routes operated by CDC Melbourne, Kinetic Melbourne, Sunbury Bus Service and Transit Systems Victoria. It is also served by Yarra Trams routes and.
