= Ballarat North Workshops =

Railway engineering facility in Ballarat, Victoria, Australia

Coordinates: 37.5461°S 143.8520°E

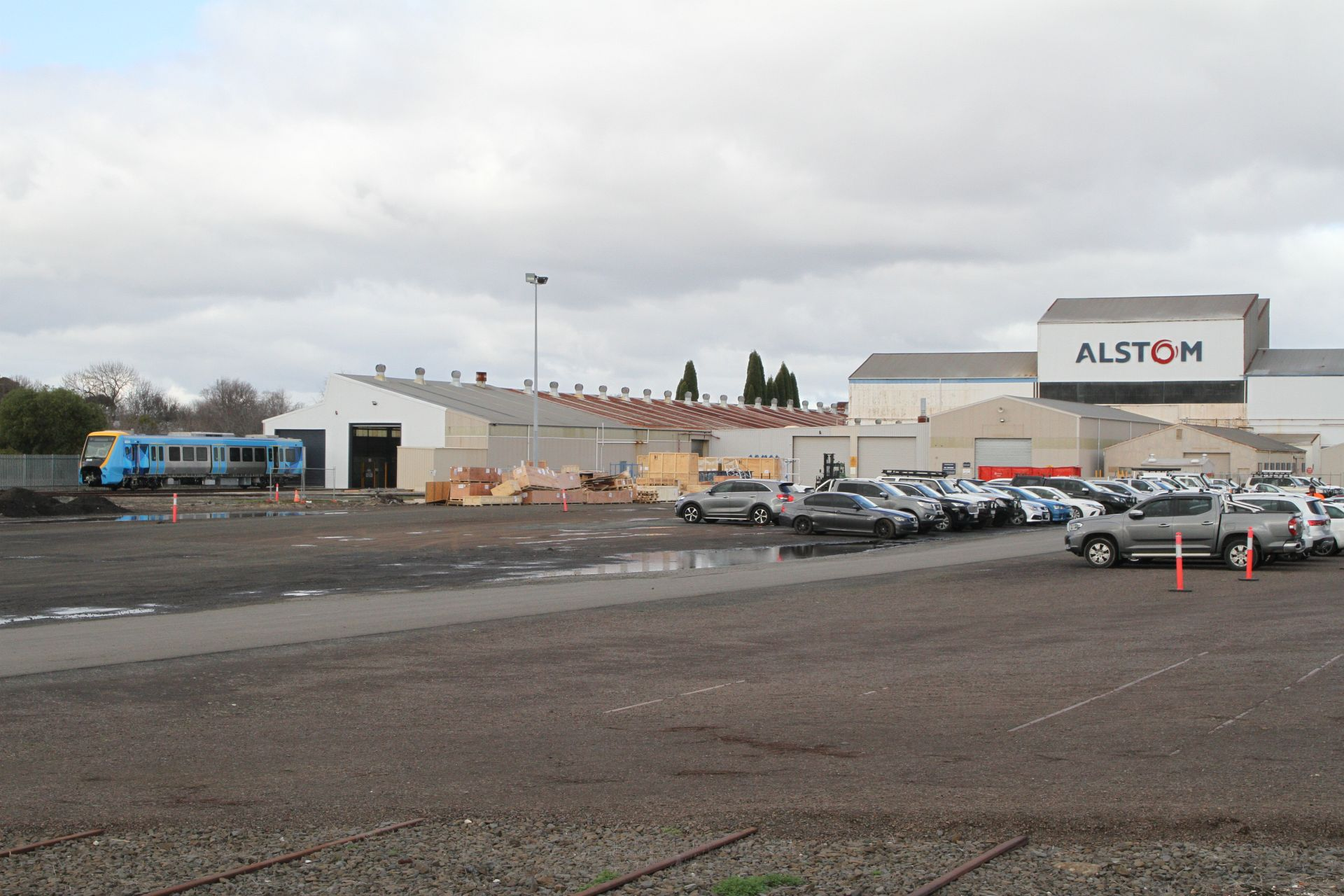
- X'Trapolis 2.0 carriage outside the Alstom Ballarat Workshops
- Built: April 1917
- Location: Creswick Road, Ballarat, Australia
- Products: Trains
- Area: 5.5 ha (14 acres)
- Owner: Alstom

Ballarat North Workshops is a railway engineering facility owned by Alstom in Ballarat, Victoria, Australia. It occupies 5.5 hectares of land beside the junction of the Mildura and Serviceton railway lines.

== History ==
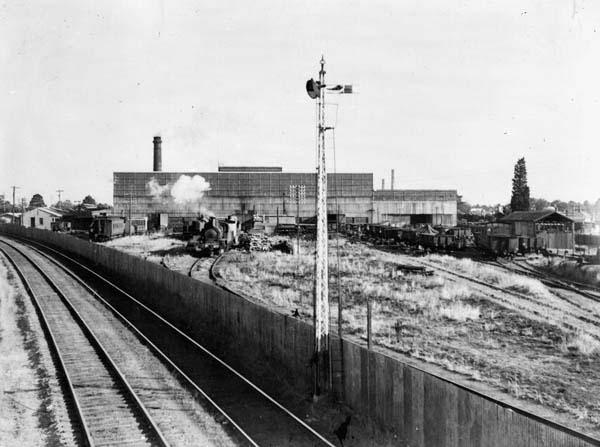
Exterior of the workshops

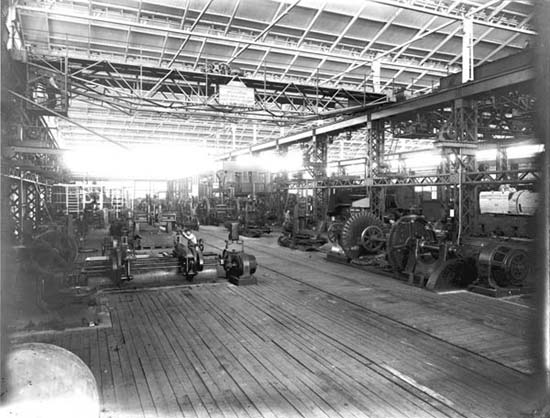
The turning and fitting shop, circa 1922

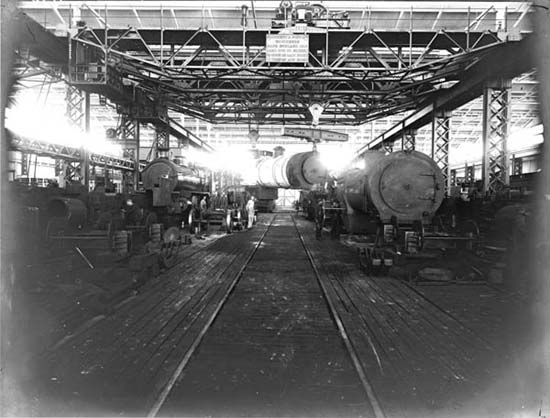
Locomotive under construction in the erecting shop, circa 1922

The workshops were opened in April 1917 by the Victorian Railways. It opened in response to political pressures from provincial groups for decentralisation, with the Victorian Railways preferring the cheaper option of expanding the existing Newport Workshops in suburban Melbourne. The main work carried out was repairs and maintenance of existing wagons and locomotives, but from 1919-22 thirteen new steam locomotives were also built - eight D^{D} class (1038 - 1042, 1050 - 1052) and five A^{2} class (1073 - 1077) steam locomotives were also built. By the 1960s goods wagons were also being built, and by the 1980s work was also being carried out on Melbourne suburban electric multiple units.

The 1980s were also a time of restructuring, with run down facilities replaced and modernised, but a large number of the 540 employees were made redundant. With the breakup of the Victorian Railways the workshops passed to the State Transport Authority and then the Public Transport Corporation. With privatisation the workshops were sold to Alstom in 1999.

In 2005, Alstom sold its Australian and New Zealand operations to United Group (and its subsidiary UGL Rail) which included a lease on the workshops. After UGL’s lease concluded in 2012, Alstom re-occupied the site.

== Operations ==
The workshops provide maintenance services to a number of Victorian Railway operators and employ 150 staff. Work includes manufacturing, reconditioning and component overhaul work for Melbourne's train and tram networks, V/Line, Pacific National and Rail First Asset Management.

Some of work undertaken that the workshops had included refurbishment of Comeng and Hitachi trains for Connex Melbourne. It had also fitted Train Protection & Warning System equipment to the V/Line fleet, and constructed 61 new 100-tonne bulk grain hoppers for Chicago Freight Car Leasing Australia. The fitout of X'Trapolis 100 imported from France were also undertaken at Ballarat, as well as the manufacturing of the successor X'Trapolis 2.0 trains from 2024.

Alstom has a separate site in Ballarat East inherited from Bombardier Transportation, which will be one of Alstom's sites to maintain the V/Line's VLocity and classic train fleets for ten years.
