= Glenbervie railway station =

Railway station in Melbourne, Australia

Glenbervie
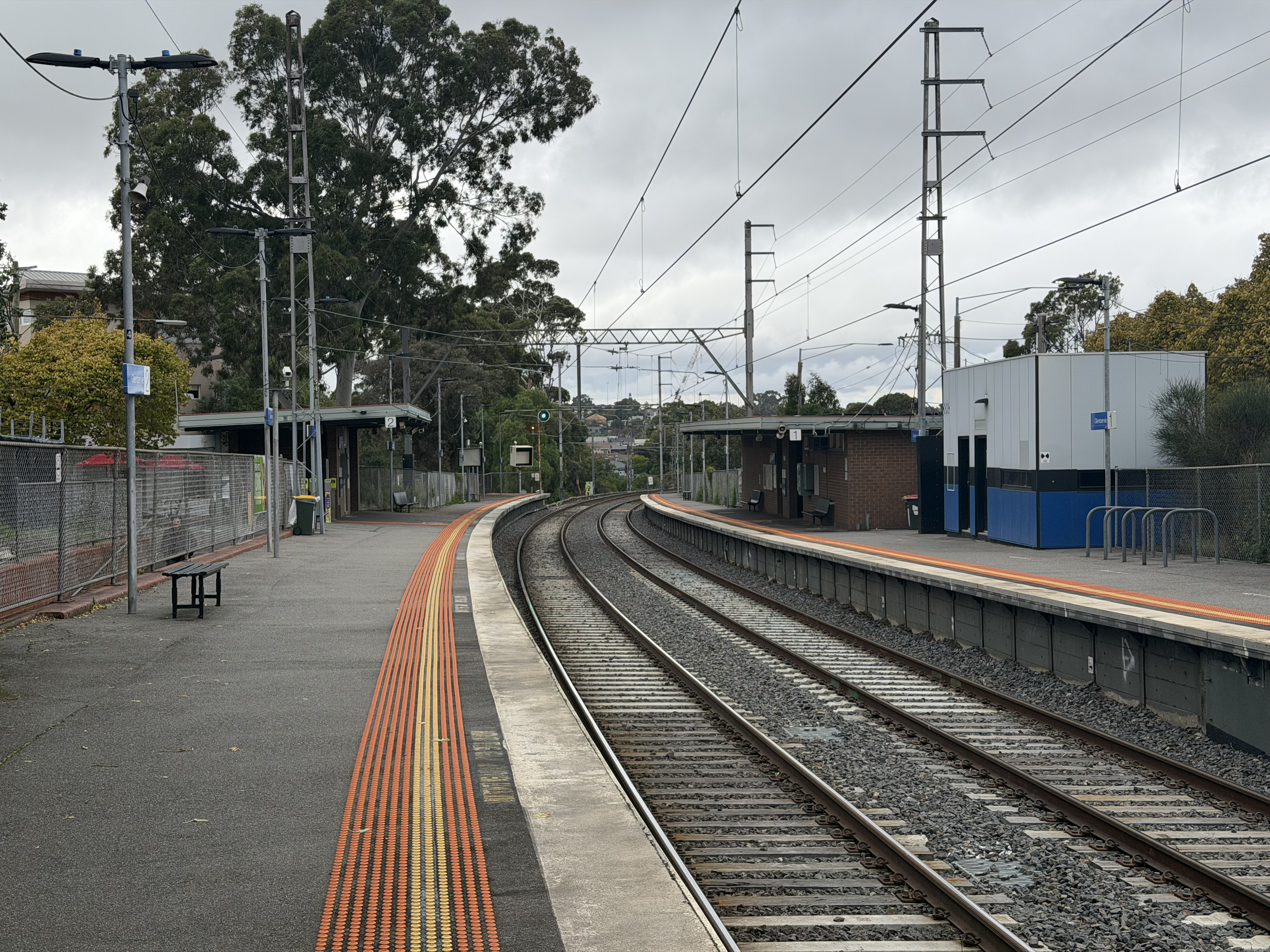
- Northbound view from Platform 2, April 2026

General information
- Location: Glass Street, Essendon, Victoria 3040; City of Moonee Valley; Australia
- Coordinates: 37°44′50″S 144°55′15″E
- System: PTV commuter rail station
- Owner: VicTrack
- Operator: Metro Trains
- Line: Craigieburn
- Distance: 9.13 kilometres from Southern Cross
- Platforms: 2 side
- Tracks: 2
- Connections: Bus

Construction
- Structure type: Ground
- Parking: 65
- Cycle facilities: 5
- Accessible: No – steep ramp

Other information
- Status: Operational, unstaffed
- Station code: GBV
- Fare zone: Myki zone 1
- Website: Public Transport Victoria

History
- Opened: 11 September 1922; 104 years ago
- Rebuilt: 1976
- Electrified: September 1921 (1500 V DC overhead)

Passengers
2005–2018 numbers
2005–2006	268,706
2006–2007	295,366 ▲9.92%
2007–2008	336,544 ▲13.94%
2008–2009	345,979 ▲2.8%
2009–2010	350,656 ▲1.35%
2010–2011	347,931 ▼0.77%
2011–2012	315,886 ▼9.21%
2012–2013	Not measured
2013–2014	337,101 ▲6.71%
2014–2015	344,879 ▲2.3%
2015–2016	366,179 ▲6.17%
2016–2017	368,501 ▲0.63%
2017–2018	367,174 ▼0.36%
- 2018–2019: 380,824 ▲3.71%
- 2019–2020: 301,950 ▼20.71%
- 2020–2021: 109,700 ▼63.66%
- 2021–2022: 131,350 ▲19.73%
- 2022–2023: 216,300 ▲64.67%
- 2023–2024: 263,100 ▲21.63%
- 2024–2025: 272,200 ▲3.34%

Services
Preceding station	Metro Trains	Following station
Essendon towards Flinders Street	Craigieburn line	Strathmore towards Craigieburn
Track layout
Location

Glenbervie station is a railway station operated by Metro Trains Melbourne on the Craigieburn line, part of the Melbourne rail network. It serves the northern suburb of Essendon in Melbourne, Victoria, Australia. Glenbervie station is a ground-level unstaffed station, featuring two side platforms. It opened on 11 September 1922, with the current station buildings provided in 1976.

== History ==
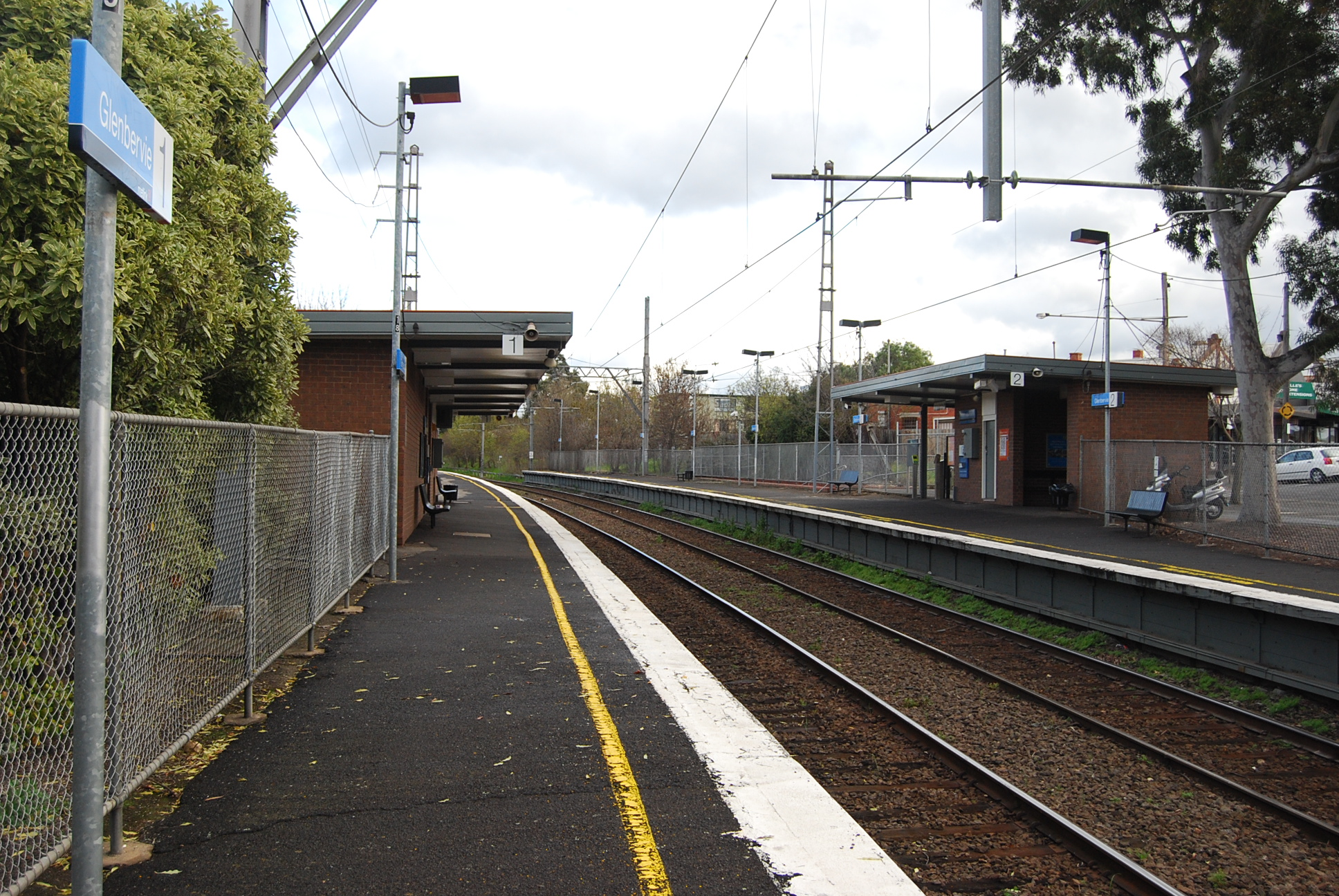
Southbound view from Platform 1, July 2011

The railway line past the site of Glenbervie originally opened in 1872, as part of the North East line to School House Lane. The station itself opened on 11 September 1922, a year after the line was electrified. It was named in honour of local settler Thomas Napier, who was originally from Scotland. Glenbervie, in Aberdeenshire, was the ancestral birthplace of Napier's father, grandfather, and great grandfather.

The station was initially provided with small timber station buildings. In 1976, they were replaced by the current buildings. A timber footbridge originally linked the two platforms.

== Platforms and services ==
Glenbervie has two side platforms. It is served by Craigieburn line trains.

Glenbervie platform arrangement
Platform	Line	Destination	Via	Service Type	Notes	Source
1	Craigieburn line	Flinders Street	City Loop	All stations	See City Loop for operating patterns	
2	Craigieburn line	Craigieburn		All stations		

== Transport links ==
One bus route operates via Glenbervie station, under contract to Public Transport Victoria:

- 469 : Moonee Ponds Junction – Keilor East (operated by CDC Melbourne)
