= South Australian Railways E class =

Class of Australian 2-4-0T locomotives

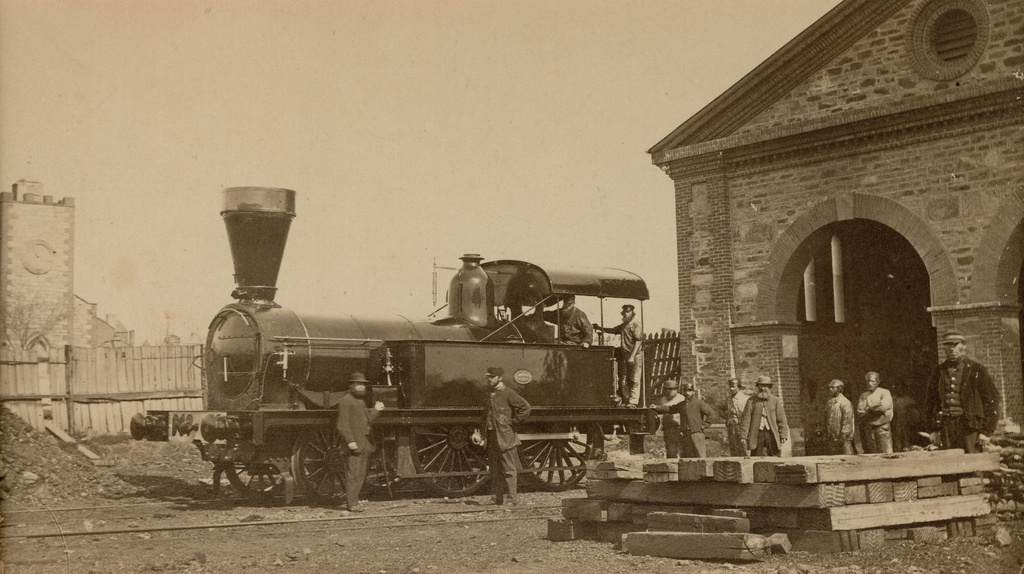
- E class locomotive no. 14 in August 1865
Type and origin
- Power type: Steam
- Builder: Slaughter Grüning & Co, Bristol; Avonside Engine Company, Bristol; Adelaide Locomotive Works
- Build date: 1862–1882
- Total produced: 7
- Rebuild date: 1864–1889
- Number rebuilt: 7
Specifications
- Configuration
  - Whyte: 2-4-0T; 2-4-0
- Gauge: 5 ft 3 in (1600 mm)
- Length: 26 ft 4 in (8.026 m) (original); 42 ft 4 1/4 in (12.910 m) (rebuild)
- Height: 12 ft 11 1/2 in (3.950 m)
- Axle load: 9 long tons 7 cwt (20,900 lb or 9.5 t) (original); 11 long tons 14 cwt (26,200 lb or 11.9 t) (rebuild)
- Loco weight: 32 long tons 10 cwt (72,800 lb or 33 t)
- Total weight: 44 long tons 12 cwt (99,900 lb or 45.3 t)
- Fuel type: Coal
- Fuel capacity: 0 long tons 12 cwt (1,300 lb or 0.6 t) (tank version); 4 long tons 3 cwt 1 qr (9,320 lb or 4.23 t) (Tender)
- Water cap.: 600 imp gal (720 US gal; 2,700 L) (Tank); 1,500 imp gal (1,800 US gal; 6,800 L) (tender version)
- Boiler pressure: 130 psi (896 kPa)
- Heating surface
  - Firebox: 89.5 sq ft (8.31 m^{2})
  - Tubes: 805.2 sq ft (74.81 m^{2})
- Cylinders: 2
Performance figures
- Tractive effort: 7450 lbf (33.1 kN) (original); 7910 lbf (35.2 kN) (rebuild)
Career
- Operators: South Australian Railways
- Class: E
- Numbers: 10, 13, 14, 42 (49), 50, 51, 56
- Withdrawn: 1886–1929
- Scrapped: 1886–1929
- Disposition: All scrapped

The South Australian Railways E class was a class of 2-4-0 steam locomotives acquired to work passenger and goods train services on the South Australian Railways broad-gauge system.

== History ==
In January 1862, Slaughter Gruning & Co, Bristol delivered two locomotives of 2-4-0 wheel arrangement to the Melbourne and Essendon Railway Company. Only one was required, so the second was sold to the South Australian Railways in April 1862, entering service numbered 10. It was joined by the other locomotive in January 1865, numbered 13. A third example was delivered by the Avonside Engine Company, Bristol in September 1865 and numbered 14.

In 1878, a further three that had been made redundant by a track gauge conversion project were purchased from the Canterbury Railway of New Zealand. All were aboard the ship Hyderabad, which ran aground on 24 June 1878 on Waitarere Beach between Ōtaki and Foxton. They eventually arrived at Port Adelaide on other ships. The first entered traffic in April 1880.

In September 1881, no. 13 was converted to a tender locomotive for use on the Kapunda to Adelaide line. A seventh was built in 1882 by the Adelaide Locomotive Works using parts from other locomotives. Number 13 was the first withdrawn, in September 1896; the last, nos. 49 and 51, were withdrawn in April 1929.

== Class list ==
Road number	Builder	Builder's number	In service	Withdrawn	Notes
10	Slaughter, Grüning & Co	459	April 1862	December 1904	Was Melbourne and Essendon Railway Company no. 2
13	Slaughter, Grüning & Co	458	January 1865	September 1896	Was Melbourne and Essendon Railway Company no. 1
14	Avonside Engine Company	587	September 1865	August 1899	Purchased new from successor company to Slaughter, Grüning
42	Avonside Engine Company	742	April 1880	April 1929	Was Canterbury Railway no. 4; renumbered no. 49 by SAR in 1889
50	Avonside Engine Company	699	January 1882	October 1900	Was Canterbury Railway no. 3
51	Slaughter Gruning & Co	532	December 1881	April 1929	Was Canterbury Railway no. 2
56	Adelaide Locomotive Works	1	May 1882	December 1904	Frame and wheels from Canterbury Railway no. 1 via Melbourne and Essendon Railway Company; assembled with parts from SAR no. 2
