= X'Trapolis 2.0 =

Rolling stock being constructed for use and is currently used on Melbourne's rail network

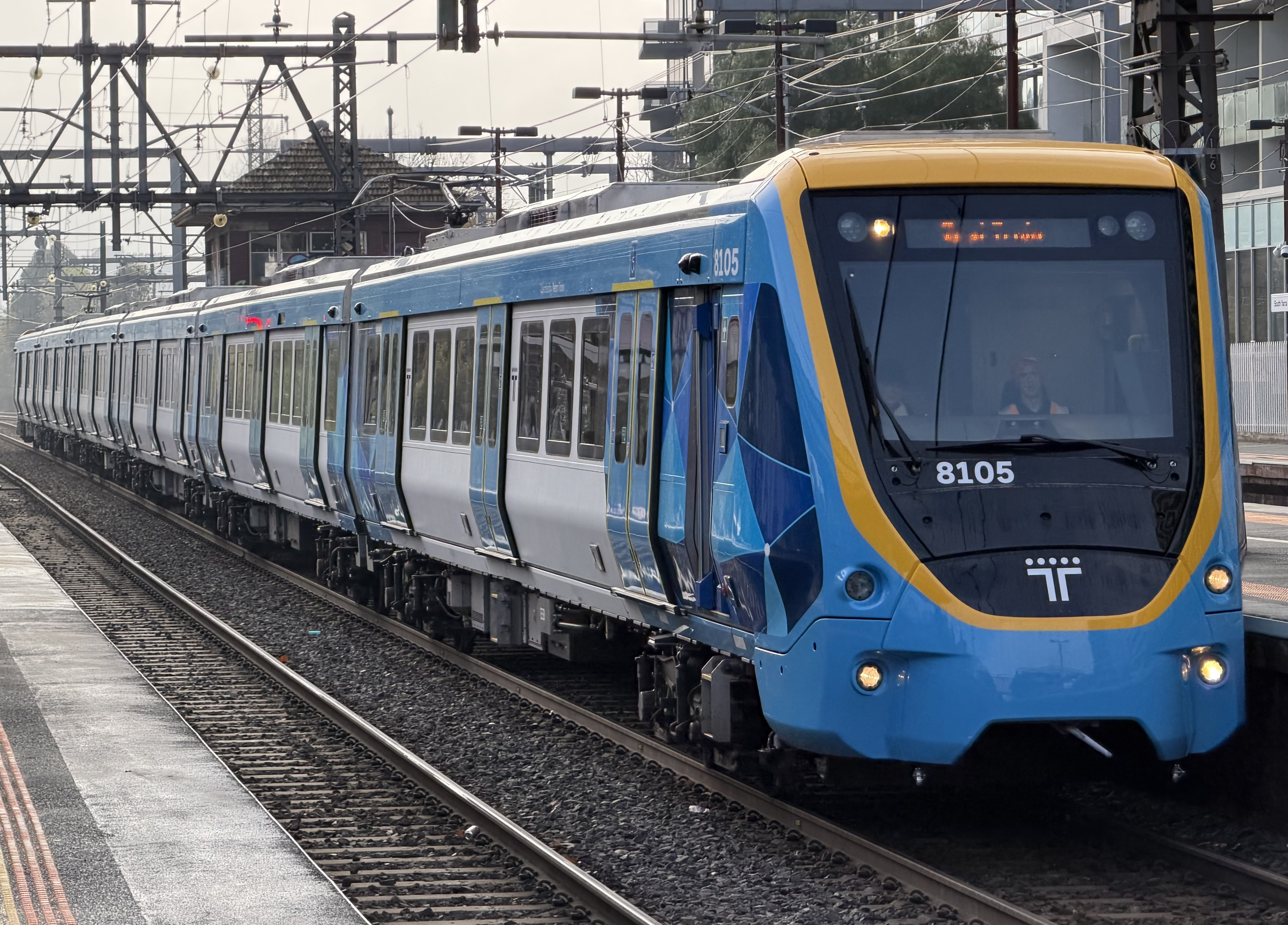
- X'Trapolis 2.0 set 5 at South Yarra station, June 2026

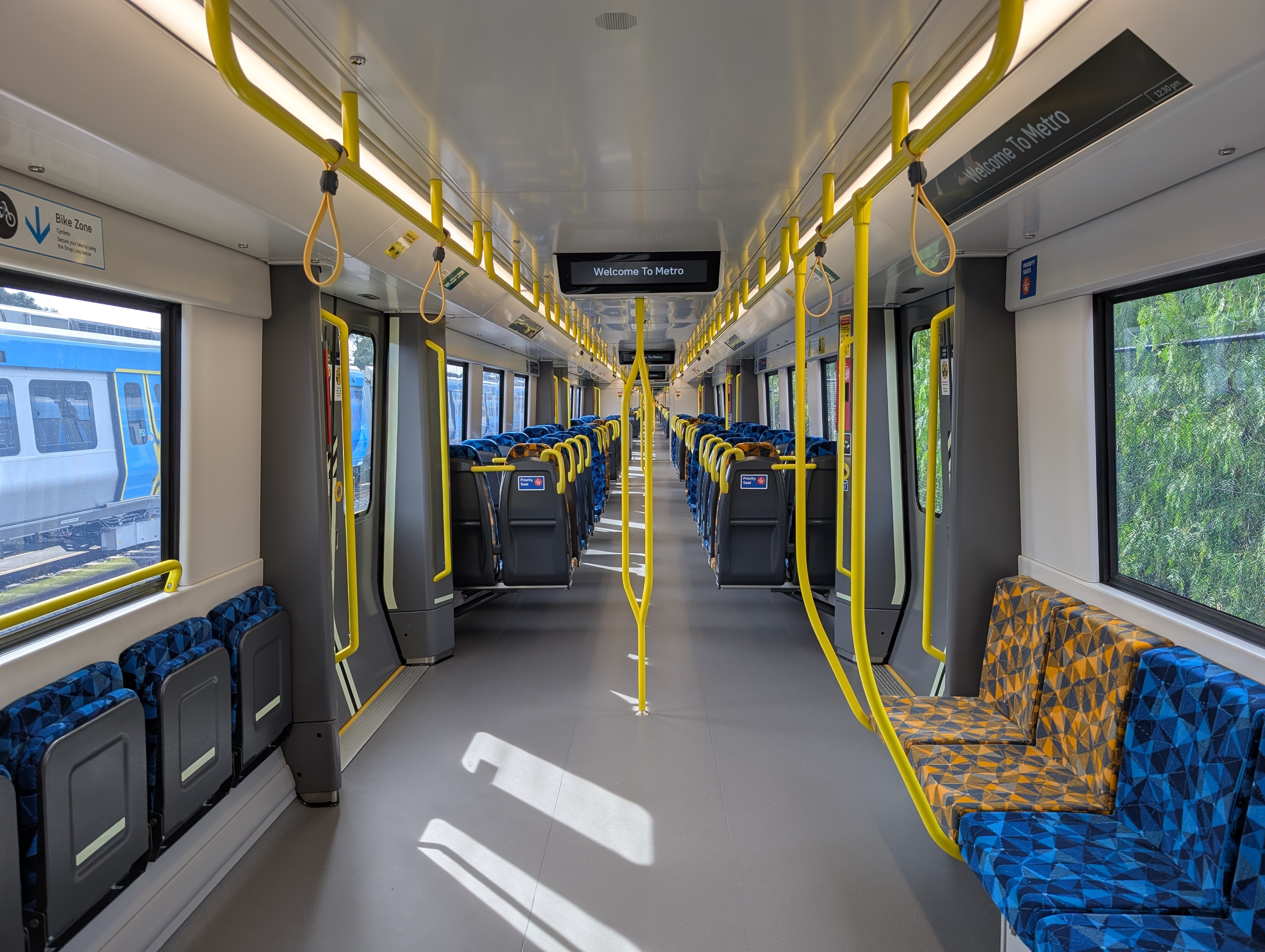
- Interior of the X'Trapolis 2.0, April 2026
- Stock type: Electric multiple unit
- Manufacturer: Alstom
- Assembly: Ballarat, Australia
- Built at: Ballarat North Workshops
- Family name: X'Trapolis
- Constructed: 2024–present
- Entered service: 3 May 2026
- Number under construction: 234 carriages (39 sets)
- Number built: 66 carriages (11 sets)
- Number in service: 12 carriages (2 sets)
- Predecessor: Comeng
- Formation: 6-car sets Mc–Tp–M1–M2–Tp–Mc
- Fleet numbers: 01–50
- Capacity: 1241 (443 seated, 798 standing)
- Operator: Metro Trains Melbourne
- Depots: Craigieburn; Kananook
- Line served: Craigieburn Upfield Frankston

Specifications
- Train length: 144.35 m (473 ft 7 1/16 in)
- Car length: 24,935 mm (81 ft 9 11/16 in) (Mc); 23.62 m (77 ft 5 15/16 in) (Tp/M)
- Width: 3.03 m (9 ft 11 5/16 in)
- Height: 3.7 m (12 ft 1 11/16 in) (excluding roof equipment)
- Floor height: 1.17 m (3 ft 10 in)
- Maximum speed: 130 km/h (81 mph)
- Weight: 243,522 kg (536,874 lb)
- Traction motors: 16
- Acceleration: 1.2 m/s^{2} (3.9 ft/s^{2})
- Deceleration: 1.15 m/s^{2} (3.8 ft/s^{2}) (service); 1.35 m/s^{2} (4.4 ft/s^{2}) (emergency)
- Electric systems: 1,500 V DC (nominal) from overhead catenary
- Current collection: Pantograph
- UIC classification: Bo′Bo′+2′2′+Bo′Bo′+Bo′Bo′+2′2′+Bo′Bo′
- Coupling system: Dellner
- Track gauge: 1,600 mm (5 ft 3 in) broad gauge

The X'Trapolis 2.0 is a series of electric multiple unit (EMU) trains produced for the suburban rail network of Melbourne, the capital city of Victoria, Australia. The trains are part of Alstom's X'Trapolis family. Construction of the trains started in 2024 at Alstom's Ballarat North Workshops, and testing began in March 2025. The first train set of this fleet entered service on 3 May 2026.

The X'Trapolis 2.0 will replace the Comeng fleet on the Craigieburn, Upfield, and Frankston lines.

== History ==
=== Testing and commissioning (2025–present) ===
Testing of the trains began on 7 March 2025 on the Werribee line, between Newport and Laverton stations. The trains will eventually replace the Comeng fleet on the Craigieburn, Upfield and Frankston lines. The Comeng trains are the oldest trains currently in operation on Melbourne's suburban rail network, having been first introduced in 1982.

=== Revenue service (2026–present) ===
X'Trapolis 2.0 Set 5 after running its first public services at Flinders Street, May 2026

On 3 May 2026, Set 5 became the first train of the X'Trapolis 2.0 fleet to enter service, running the 9:06am Flinders Street to Upfield and back on the 9:53am service to the city.

=== Order batches ===
In the 2021–22 state budget, the Victorian Government announced $986 million in funding for an initial order of 25 new X'Trapolis 2.0 trains to be built by rolling stock manufacturer Alstom, which built the X'Trapolis 100 trains used on much of the Melbourne rail network. The $986 million funding also included an upgrade to the Craigieburn train maintenance facility, to support maintaining and storing the new fleet.

On 20 April 2026, the Victorian Government announced that an additional 25 X'Trapolis 2.0 sets were ordered as part of the $673.6 million 2026–27 state budget, bringing the fleet into a total of 50 6-car trains. The total order is enough to replace the remaining Comeng train sets in-service.

== Construction ==
In 2023, a life-size mock-up of the train was put on display to receive feedback on its design and accessibility features.

The X'Trapolis 2.0 trains are being built at Alstom's Dandenong and Ballarat North Workshops with a 60% local content quota to support local manufacturing jobs. The government claims the project will support 750 jobs and ensure continued operation of the Ballarat North Workshops, following concern by Alstom and trade unions about the facility's future. On 19 November 2024, the first X'Trapolis 2.0 train was completed.

== Design ==
The X'Trapolis 2.0 trains are a six-car electric multiple unit design, similar to the seven-car High Capacity Metro Train, compared to the Comeng, X'Trapolis 100 and Siemens Nexas trains which are three-car sets run in tandem. Much like the High Capacity Metro Train and the Siemens Nexas, the X'Trapolis 2.0 uses a continuous walk-through design. The trains are designed for a maximum capacity of 1241 people, a slight improvement over the 1127-person capacity of a six-car Comeng train.

Features of the X'Trapolis 2.0 also include:

- Wide doors to reduce boarding and alighting times to under 40 seconds
- Passenger information systems that display journey information in real time
- 20 wheelchairs-designated spaces, and seating designed for bicycle and pram storage
- Semi-automatic wheelchair ramps located behind driver cabs
