= Essendon railway station =

Railway station in Melbourne, Australia

Essendon
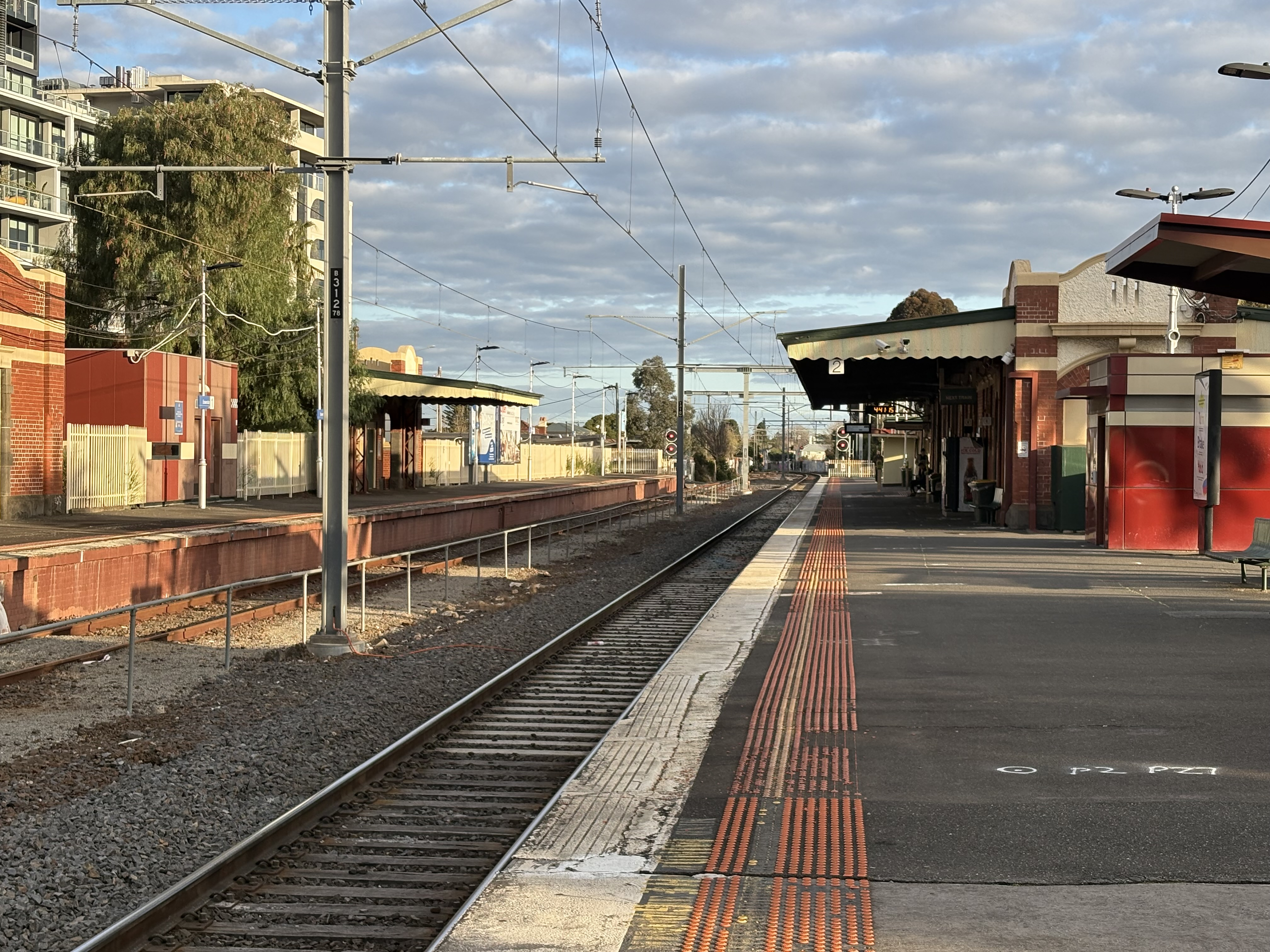
- Southbound view from Platform 2, August 2026

General information
- Location: Russell Street, Essendon, Victoria 3040; City of Moonee Valley; Australia
- Coordinates: 37°45′22″S 144°54′58″E
- System: PTV commuter and regional rail station
- Owner: VicTrack
- Operator: Metro Trains; V/Line
- Lines: Craigieburn; Seymour Shepparton (Tocumwal)
- Distance: 8.01 kilometres from Southern Cross
- Platforms: 3 (1 side, 1 island)
- Tracks: 3
- Connections: Bus; Tram

Construction
- Structure type: Ground
- Parking: 499
- Cycle facilities: Yes
- Accessible: No – steep ramp

Other information
- Status: Operational, premium station
- Station code: ESD
- Fare zone: Myki zone 1
- Website: Public Transport Victoria

History
- Opened: 1 November 1860; 165 years ago
- Closed: 1 July 1864
- Rebuilt: 9 October 1871
- Electrified: May 1919 (1500 V DC overhead)

Passengers
2005–2018 numbers
2005–2006	1,453,109
2006–2007	1,494,586 ▲2.85%
2007–2008	1,673,602 ▲11.97%
2008–2009	1,680,211 ▲0.39%
2009–2010	1,736,588 ▲3.35%
2010–2011	1,702,189 ▼1.98%
2011–2012	1,670,551 ▼1.86%
2012–2013	Not measured
2013–2014	1,599,832 ▼4.23%
2014–2015	1,570,121 ▼1.85%
2015–2016	1,597,247 ▲1.72%
2016–2017	1,750,538 ▲9.59%
2017–2018	1,688,377 ▼3.55%
- 2018–2019: 1,480,050 ▼12.34%
- 2019–2020: 1,298,700 ▼12.25%
- 2020–2021: 579,150 ▼55.4%
- 2021–2022: 723,050 ▲24.84%
- 2022–2023: 1,160,200 ▲60.46%
- 2023–2024: 1,312,800 ▲13.15%
- 2024–2025: 1,437,950 ▲2.68%

Services
Preceding station	Metro Trains	Following station
Moonee Ponds towards Flinders Street	Craigieburn line	Glenbervie towards Craigieburn
Preceding station	V/Line	Following station
North Melbourne towards Southern Cross	Seymour line Weekday peak only	Broadmeadows towards Seymour
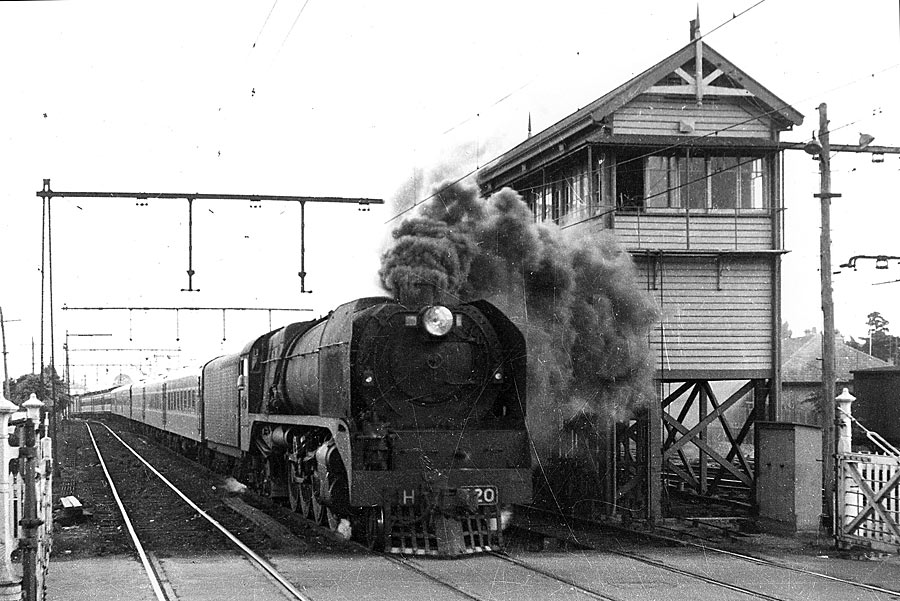
- H 220 leads the northbound Albury Express past the signal box, c. 1949

History
- Built: 1878–1922 (heritage structures)

Site notes
- Architectural style: Federation Free Classical

Victorian Heritage Register
- Official name: Essendon Railway Station Complex
- Type: Registered place
- Designated: 20 August 1982
- Reference no.: H1562
- Heritage overlay no.: HO51
- Category: Transport - Rail
Track layout
Location

Essendon station is a railway station operated by Metro Trains Melbourne on the Craigieburn and Seymour lines, part of the Melbourne and Victorian railway networks. It serves the northern suburb of Essendon in Melbourne, Victoria, Australia. Essendon station is a ground level premium station, featuring three platforms, an island platform with two faces and one side platform. It opened on 1 November 1860, with the current station provided in 1871. The station originally closed on 1 July 1864, but was later reopened on 9 October 1871.

The railway station complex was added to the Victorian Heritage Register on 20 August 1982 in recognition of its architectural, aesthetic, social and historical importance.

== History ==
Essendon station opened on 1 November 1860 as the terminus of the private Melbourne and Essendon Railway Company line. The station closed with the line on 1 July 1864, but was reopened on 9 October 1871, under government ownership. The line to the north was opened in 1872, as part of the North East line to School House Lane. Like the suburb itself, the station was named after Essendon in Hertfordshire, England.

In 1878, a completely new station, with a single platform, was provided, on the site of the present island platform, with passenger subways and footbridges added in 1886, along with conversion of the island platform to the current layout. It was also at that time that a rail overpass was provided at Mount Alexander Road, in what was one of the first grade separation projects to be carried out in the state. In 1909, the present buildings were provided, along with a centre track between Platforms 1 and 2.

In 1919, electric train services between the city and Essendon were inaugurated, with electrification extended to Broadmeadows in 1921. However, Essendon remained the terminus of most suburban services, with a shuttle service operating beyond until 1925, and all-day through services to Broadmeadows not provided until 1941.

In 1965, the double line block signalling between Broadmeadows and Essendon was abolished, and was replaced with three position signalling. In 1969, the station took the layout it has today, with the abolition of the centre track, the closure of the stand-alone signal box, the provision of automatic signalling along the line, and the replacement of the interlocked gates with boom barriers at the former Buckley Street level crossing. A signal panel was provided within the station office in that same year.

On 7 March 1974, Harris motor 518M and Tait motor 368M were destroyed by fire whilst stabled at the station. Tait trailer 85G was also damaged in the fire.

On 8 June 1987, stabling of suburban trains at Essendon ceased, with the overhead wiring of all sidings removed just over a year later. On 1 September 1988, the former sidings near Rose Street were removed.

On 16 August 1996, Essendon was upgraded to a premium station. Also in that year, siding "B" was taken out of service. On 7 June 2014, the signal panel was abolished.

In 2018, the adjacent Buckley Street level crossing was grade separated, the street reopening on 28 September of that year after construction. Buckley Street now passes under the railway line in a trench.

As part of the Melbourne Metro Rail Tunnel, it was expected that the turnback facilities at the station would be upgraded, to allow services to start at Essendon when the tunnel opens in 2025, but this was ultimately cut from the project.

=== Heritage structures ===
Parts of the station complex were added to the Victoria Heritage Register in 1982 and include the initial single-faced platform (1878)—now island platform (1886),—subways and footbridges (1886), the centre platform, station building, and the lamp room/store complex (1909), and the parcels office (1922), completed in the Federation Free Classical style. The majority of the buildings are in red brick with rough cast stucco above door and window height. Details include ornate parapets and cantilever verandahs to the platforms, and bluestone quoin work around the openings. The cantilever verandahs are clad in corrugated iron sheet and faced with a ripple iron valance.

== Platforms and services ==
Essendon has one island platform with two faces and one side platform. Platform 1 is only used by V/Line services to overtake Metro Trains' services, or when three-car trains are terminating, as it is unable to accommodate a six-car train.

The station is served by Craigieburn line trains and some V/Line Seymour line services.

=== Metropolitan ===
Essendon platform arrangement
Platform	Line	Destination	Via	Service Type	Notes	Source
1	No scheduled services.					
2	Craigieburn line	Flinders Street	City Loop	All stations	See City Loop for operating patterns	
3	Craigieburn line	Craigieburn		All stations		

=== Regional ===
Essendon platform arrangement
Platform	Line	Destination	Service Type	Notes
2	Seymour line Shepparton line	Southern Cross	Three weekday morning peak-hour V/Line services (Seymour), one weekday morning peak-hour V/Line service (Shepparton)	Set down only
3	Seymour line Shepparton line	Seymour, Shepparton	Four weekday evening peak-hour V/Line services (Seymour), one weekday evening peak-hour V/Line service (Shepparton)	Pick up only

== Transport links ==
Ten bus routes operate via Essendon station, under contract to Public Transport Victoria:

- 465 : to Keilor Park (operated by CDC Melbourne)
- 468 : to Highpoint Shopping Centre (operated by CDC Melbourne)
- 469 : Moonee Ponds Junction – Keilor East (operated by CDC Melbourne)
- 476 : Watergardens station – Moonee Ponds Junction (operated by CDC Melbourne)
- 477 : Moonee Ponds Junction – Broadmeadows station (operated by CDC Melbourne)
- 483 : Sunbury station – Moonee Ponds Junction (operated by Sunbury Bus Service)
- 503 : to Brunswick East (operated by Kinetic Melbourne)
- 510 : to Ivanhoe station (operated by Kinetic Melbourne)
- SmartBus 903 : Altona station – Mordialloc (operated by Kinetic Melbourne)
- Night Bus 959 : Queen Street City – Broadmeadows station (Saturday and Sunday mornings only) (operated by Ventura Bus Lines)

One tram route operates via Essendon station:

- : Airport West – Flinders Street station (via Elizabeth Street) (operated by Yarra Trams)
