= Melbourne and Essendon Railway Company =

Australian company

The Melbourne and Essendon Railway Company was formed in 1858 and was authorised by the Victorian Parliament to build a railway line from North Melbourne to Essendon. The single track railway was opened in October 1860. The company immediately commenced construction of a branch line from Newmarket to Flemington Racecourse, which opened in February 1861.

The operation was barely profitable and, in early 1864, the company asked the Government of Victoria buy the railway. The request was refused and the line was closed in July 1864. For the next three years, determined efforts were made to get the government to change its decision. In August 1867, the government paid £22,500 for the company's assets, and they became part of Victorian Railways. The racecourse branch was reopened in November 1867, and the section from Newmarket to Essendon was reopened in January 1871.

== Rolling stock ==
One steam locomotive built for the Melbourne and Essendon Railway Company in 1862 was sold unused to New Zealand's Canterbury Provincial Railways. Upon arrival in New Zealand, it became the country's first locomotive to operate in revenue service. Withdrawn in 1876, its frame subsequently returned to Australia when it was purchased by the South Australian Railways and was used as part of the SAR's locomotive No. 54, which operated until 1904.

=== Locomotives ===
| Class | Wheel arrangement | Fleet number(s) | Manufacturer Serial numbers | Year introduced | Total | Total preserved | Year(s) withdrawn | Comments |
|---|---|---|---|---|---|---|---|---|
| M&ER 2-4-0T | 2-4-0T | Essendon, #459* | Slaughter, Gruning & Co. 458, 459* | 1862 | 2* | 0 | 1864 | To SAR to become E 13 *#459 not used and sold to SAR to become E 10 |

Companies
| First | Melbourne and Essendon Railway Company; 24 February 1859 – 27 August 1867 | Succeeded by Victorian Railways |
