= Seaholme railway station =

Railway station in Melbourne, Australia

Seaholme
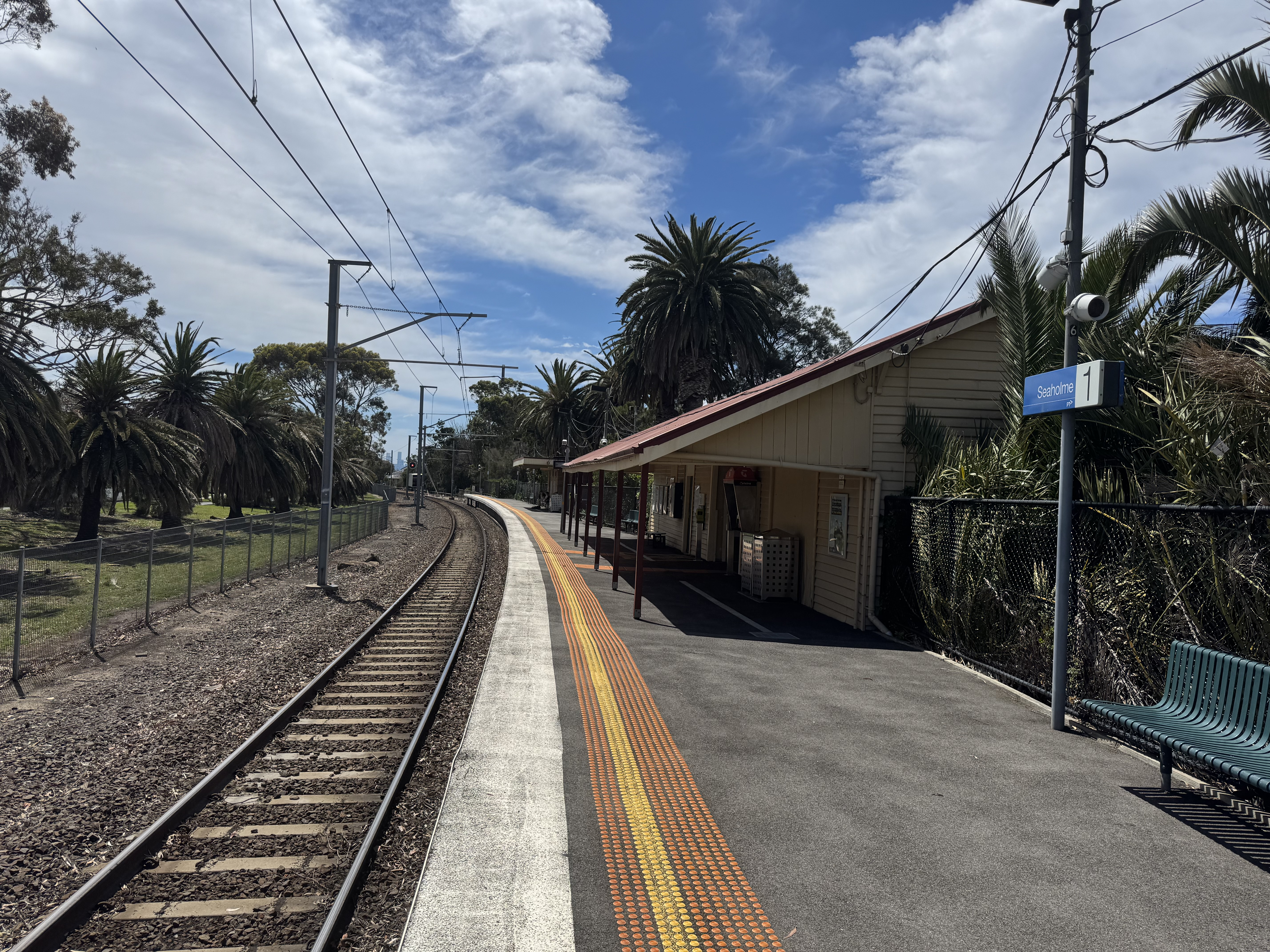
- Eastbound view from station platform and building, November 2025

General information
- Location: Station Street, Seaholme, Victoria 3018; City of Hobsons Bay; Australia
- Coordinates: 37°52′04″S 144°50′28″E
- System: PTV commuter rail station
- Owner: VicTrack
- Operator: Metro Trains
- Line: Werribee
- Distance: 16.13 kilometres from Southern Cross
- Platforms: 1
- Tracks: 1
- Connections: Bus

Construction
- Structure type: Ground
- Parking: Yes, 10 spaces
- Cycle facilities: Yes
- Accessible: No—steep ramp

Other information
- Status: Operational, unstaffed
- Station code: SHE
- Fare zone: Myki zone 1
- Website: Public Transport Victoria

History
- Opened: 26 January 1920; 106 years ago
- Electrified: 2 October 1926 (1500 V DC overhead)

Passengers
- 2005–2006: 114,947
- 2006–2007: 126,436 ▲9.99%
- 2007–2008: 146,291 ▲15.7%
- 2008–2009: 158,886 ▲8.6%
- 2009–2010: 150,744 ▼5.12%
- 2010–2011: 146,040 ▼3.12%
- 2011–2012: 116,346 ▼20.33%
- 2012–2013: Not measured
- 2013–2014: 101,559 ▼12.71%
- 2014–2015: 96,372 ▼5.1%
- 2015–2016: 98,431 ▲2.13%
- 2016–2017: 103,446 ▲5.09%
- 2017–2018: 110,143 ▲6.47%
- 2018–2019: 106,850 ▼2.98%
- 2019–2020: 89,300 ▼16.42%
- 2020–2021: 39,300 ▼55.99%
- 2021–2022: 49,550 ▲26.08%

Services
Preceding station	Metro Trains	Following station
Newport towards Sandringham via Flinders Street	Werribee line Weekdays	Altona towards Laverton
Newport towards Sandringham via Flinders Street	Werribee line Weekends	Altona towards Werribee
Former services
Preceding station	MetRail	Following station
Mobiltown towards Flinders Street	Altona line	Altona Terminus
Track layout
Location

Seaholme station is a railway station operated by Metro Trains Melbourne on the Werribee line, part of Melbourne's rail network. It serves the western suburb of Seaholme in Melbourne, Victoria, Australia.

Opened on 26 January 1920, Seaholme station is a ground level unstaffed station, featuring one side platform. The station is only partially accessible due to a steep access ramp. The station also connects to bus routes 411 and 412. The journey to Southern Cross railway station is approximately 16.13 kilometres (10.02 mi).

== Description ==
Looking westbound with an arriving eastbound train

Seaholme railway station is located in Seaholme, a suburb of Melbourne, Victoria. Operated by VicTrack, the station is owned by Metro Trains Melbourne. The station is approximately 16.13 kilometres (10.02 mi) away from Southern Cross station. The adjacent stations are Newport up towards Melbourne and Altona down towards Werribee.

The station consists of one side platform with a total of one platform edge. The station has a gabled weatherboard building with a timber verandah. The platform edge is made of timber.

== History ==
On 9 November 1888, the line from Williamstown Racecourse to Altona Beach (now Altona) was opened. Seaholme station opened on the line on 26 January 1920. Like the suburb itself, the station was named after a housing estate that opened in the early 1920s. Electrification was provided on 2 October 1926.

In 1954, flashing light signals were provided at the Millers Road level crossing, located at the down end of the station, with boom barriers provided in 1985.

During the 2016/2017 financial year, Seaholme was the fifth-least-used station on Melbourne's metropolitan network, with 103,446 passenger movements recorded.

There used to be two stations, Mobiltown and Williamstown Racecourse, between Seaholme and Newport, but they are now closed and demolished. The stations were closed on 18 January 1984 and 22 May 1950, respectively.

== Platforms and services ==
Seaholme has one side platform. It is served by Werribee line trains. The Werribee line runs from Flinders Street station to Werribee station via Southern Cross station, with services running through to Sandringham.

Seaholme platform arrangement
Platform	Line	Destination	Via	Service Type	Note	Source
1	Werribee line	Sandringham or Laverton	Newport and Flinders Street or Altona	All stations services	Weekdays: Services to Laverton serve the Altona Loop.	
1	Werribee line	Sandringham or Werribee	Newport and Flinders Street or Altona	All stations services	After 7pm & Weekends: All services to and from Werribee run via the Altona Loop.	

== Transport links ==
Seaholme station has two bus connections. These bus connections are routes 411 and 412, which both run from Laverton station to Footscray. Both services operate from a stop on Millers Road, which also serves as a rail replacement bus stop. CDC Melbourne operates these bus routes, under contract to Public Transport Victoria.

- 411 : Laverton station – Footscray
- 412 : Laverton station – Footscray
