= Aircraft railway station =

Railway station in Victoria, Australia

Aircraft
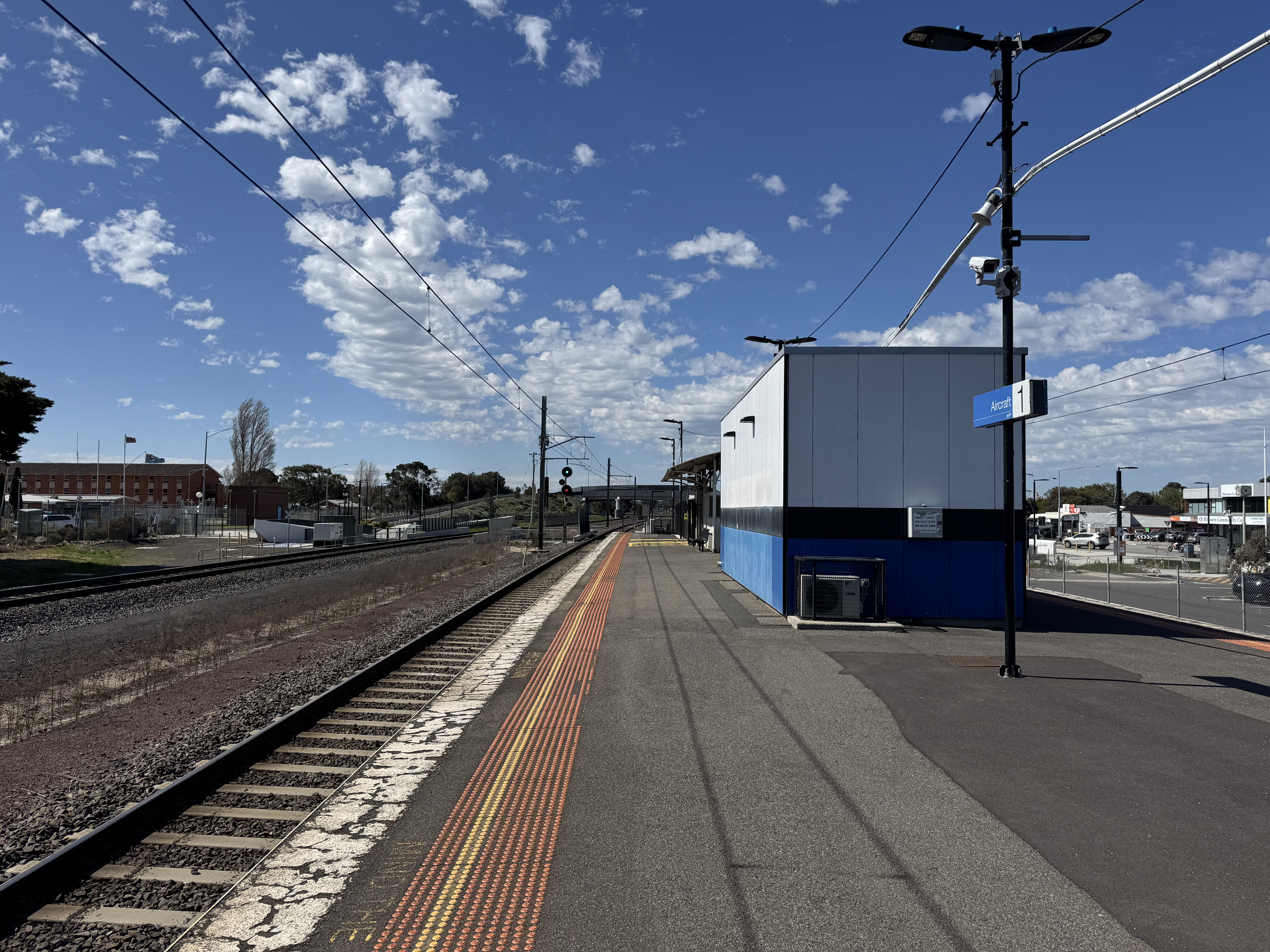
- North-east bound view from Platform 1, September 2025

General information
- Location: Triholm Avenue, Laverton, Victoria 3027; City of Hobsons Bay; Australia
- Coordinates: 37°52′00″S 144°45′39″E
- System: PTV commuter rail station
- Owner: VicTrack
- Operator: Metro Trains
- Line: Werribee
- Distance: 22.23 kilometres from Southern Cross
- Platforms: 2 (1 island)
- Tracks: 2
- Connections: Bus

Construction
- Structure type: Ground
- Parking: 140
- Cycle facilities: Yes
- Accessible: Yes—step free access

Other information
- Status: Operational, unstaffed
- Station code: ACF
- Fare zone: Myki zone 2
- Website: Public Transport Victoria

History
- Opened: 7 March 1925; 101 years ago
- Rebuilt: 10 May 1932; 1964
- Electrified: November 1983 (1500 V DC overhead)
- Former names: Aviation Siding (1925-1927); Aircraft Siding (1927-1963)

Passengers
- 2005–2006: 199,449
- 2006–2007: 250,016 ▲25.35%
- 2007–2008: 301,348 ▲20.53%
- 2008–2009: 313,692 ▲4.09%
- 2009–2010: 305,483 ▼2.61%
- 2010–2011: 324,742 ▲6.3%
- 2011–2012: 315,160 ▼2.95%
- 2012–2013: Not measured
- 2013–2014: 203,161 ▼35.53%
- 2014–2015: 242,808 ▲19.51%
- 2015–2016: 293,098 ▲20.71%
- 2016–2017: 294,702 ▲0.54%
- 2017–2018: 309,828 ▲5.13%
- 2018–2019: 303,150 ▼2.15%
- 2019–2020: 248,950 ▼17.87%
- 2020–2021: 70,150 ▼71.82%
- 2021–2022: 73,150 ▲4.27%
- 2022–2023: 194,950 ▲165.41%
- 2023–2024: 234,300 ▲20.68%
- 2024–2025: 248,850 ▲6.21%

Services
Preceding station	Metro Trains	Following station
Laverton towards Sandringham via Flinders Street	Werribee line	Williams Landing towards Werribee
Track layout
Location

Aircraft station is a railway station operated by Metro Trains Melbourne on the Werribee line, part of the Melbourne rail network. It serves the western suburb of Laverton, in Melbourne, Victoria, Australia. It opened on 7 March 1925, with the current station being provided in 1964.

Initially opened as Aviation Siding, the station has been renamed twice: to Aircraft Siding on 10 May 1927 and then to Aircraft on 19 March 1963.

The Western standard gauge line passes to the north of platform 1.

== History ==
Originally a siding serving the then Royal Australian Air Force Laverton base, a platform for passengers was provided by 10 May 1927. On 10 May 1932, the station was relocated in the up direction.

In 1964, the station was rebuilt and relocated in the down direction, just beyond the former Aviation Road level crossing. In that year, flashing light signals were provided at the level crossing and, in 1968, in conjunction with the duplication of the railway line to Werribee, Aircraft was converted to an island platform. In 1979, boom barriers were provided at the level crossing.

In 2010, doubt was cast on the future of the station after the announcement that Williams Landing would be built just a kilometre down the line. In June 2010, a spokesman for then Public Transport Minister, Martin Pakula, said only that Aircraft would remain until 2012, the opening date of Williams Landing. At the same time, the construction of 100 new car-parking spaces was cancelled, and railway sources confirmed that the government's plans were to close Aircraft. However, in September 2010, the Public Transport Minister ended speculation by pledging that the station would not be closed.

In September 2019, the Level Crossing Removal Project grade separated the adjacent level crossing with a road-over-rail bridge, and the entrance of the station was reconstructed. In March 2022, a new pedestrian underpass opened at the up end of the station, replacing a pedestrian crossing. In April of that year, a new car-park opened to the south of the station.

== Platforms and services ==
Aircraft has one island platform with two faces and is served by Werribee line trains.

Aircraft platform arrangement
Platform	Line	Destination	Via	Service Type	Notes	Source
1	Werribee line	Flinders Street or Sandringham	Flinders Street	Limited Express services	Weekdays only	
1	Werribee line	Sandringham	Altona and Flinders Street	All stations		
2	Werribee line	Werribee		All stations		

== Transport links ==
CDC Melbourne operates three bus routes via Aircraft station, under contract to Public Transport Victoria:

- 415 : Laverton station – Williamstown
- 417 : Laverton station – Laverton station (loop service via Laverton North)
- 496 : Laverton station – Sanctuary Lakes (Point Cook)
