= Hampton railway station, Melbourne =

Railway station in Melbourne, Australia

Hampton
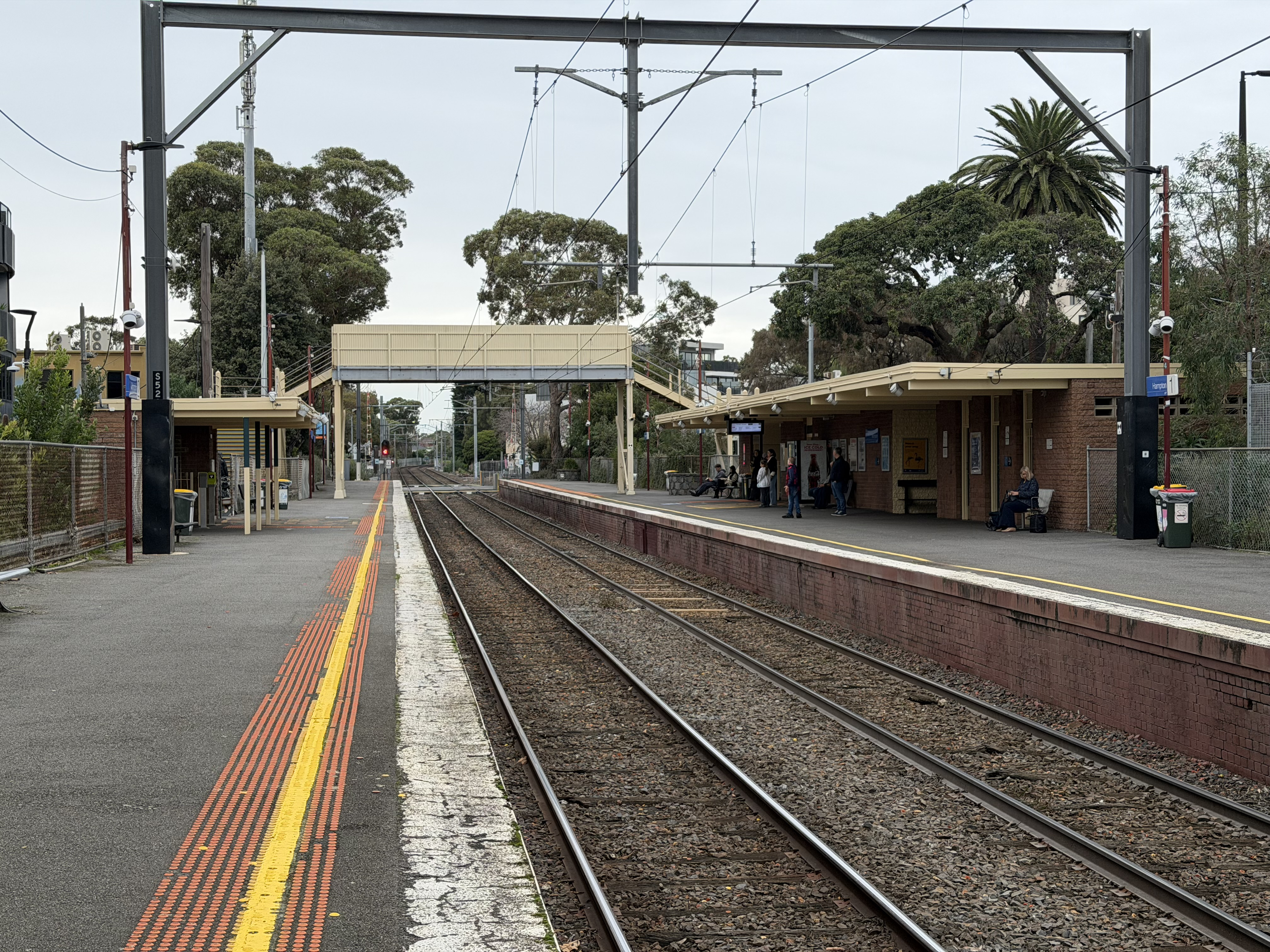
- Southbound view from Platform 2, June 2026

General information
- Location: Railway Crescent, Hampton, Victoria 3188; City of Bayside; Australia
- Coordinates: 37°56′18″S 145°00′05″E
- System: PTV commuter rail station
- Owner: VicTrack
- Operator: Metro Trains
- Line: Sandringham
- Distance: 17.70 kilometres from Southern Cross
- Platforms: 2 side
- Tracks: 2
- Connections: Bus

Construction
- Structure type: Ground
- Parking: 170
- Cycle facilities: Yes
- Accessible: Yes—step free access

Other information
- Status: Operational, unstaffed
- Station code: HAM
- Fare zone: Myki zone 2
- Website: Public Transport Victoria

History
- Opened: 2 September 1887; 138 years ago
- Rebuilt: 1975
- Electrified: May 1919 (1500 V DC overhead)
- Former names: Retreat (1887–1889)

Passengers
- 2017–2018: 604,944
- 2018–2019: 577,219 ▼4.58%
- 2019–2020: 501,150 ▼13.17%
- 2020–2021: 229,200 ▼54.26%
- 2021–2022: 269,050 ▲17.38%
- 2022–2023: 436,550 ▲62.26%
- 2023–2024: 493,950 ▲13.15%
- 2024–2025: 482,700 ▼2.28%

Services
Preceding station	Metro Trains	Following station
Brighton Beach towards Laverton, Werribee or Williamstown via Flinders Street	Sandringham line	Sandringham Terminus
Track layout
Location

Hampton station is a railway station operated by Metro Trains Melbourne on the Sandringham line, part of the Melbourne rail network. It serves the south-eastern Melbourne suburb of Hampton in Victoria, Australia. Hampton is a ground level unstaffed station, featuring two side platforms, connected by a disabled access footbridge and accessed through by brick station buildings provided in the platforms. It opened on 2 September 1887, with the current station buildings provided in 1975.

Initially opened as Hampton, the station was renamed two times. It was renamed to Retreat on 2 October 1887, then was given its original and current name of Hampton on 10 September 1889. The level crossing at Hampton Street is located on the south side of the station. The station has independent disabled access.

== History ==
Hampton station opened on 2 September 1887, when the railway line from Brighton Beach was extended to Sandringham. Like the suburb itself, the station was named after Dyas Hampton, an early local market gardener. Developers at the time also like the regal sounding name, which was akin to neighbouring suburb Sandringham.

In 1906, an 80 year old man got off of a train at night, and slipped between the train and the platform, suffering a broken thigh. The Shire of Moorabbin passed a resolution for the station to be lit up.

In 1924, the station building was broken into, with some parcels being rifled through. In 1930, a 33 year old man was sentenced to 12 months imprisonment for breaking into the station building around three weeks earlier. In 1936, there were requests to the City of Sandringham for "beautification" to occur around the station. The council, in 1920, had bought land around the station for the same purposes, however they found the land to be boggy and difficult to cultivate, and the title was handed back. Ward members from Hampton advised for the works not to go through.

In 1966, boom barriers replaced interlocked gates at the Hampton Street level crossing, located at the south (down) end of the station. The signal box which protected the level crossing was also abolished during this time. On 16 January 1968, a collision involving two Tait train sets occurred between Hampton and Sandringham.

In 1975, the present brick station buildings were provided.

On 30 August 2002, Comeng motor carriage 500M was destroyed by fire as it travelled between Hampton and Sandringham.

In November 2016, a proposed development near the station generated controversy, as it was seen as "bringing a white cruise ship" to Hampton.

== Platforms and services ==
Hampton has two side platforms. It is serviced by Metro Trains' Sandringham line services.

On rare occasions, extra services for major events may originate at Hampton instead of Sandringham. These services are formed by empty trains directly from the stabling yard at Sandringham.

Hampton platform arrangement
Platform	Line	Destination	Via	Service Type	Notes	Source
1	Sandringham line	Laverton, Werribee or Williamstown	Flinders Street	All stations	Services to Laverton and Williamstown only operate on weekdays.	
2	Sandringham line	Sandringham		All stations		

== Transport links ==
Kinetic Melbourne operates one bus route via Hampton station, under contract to Public Transport Victoria:

- 922 : Westfield Southland – St Kilda station

Ventura Bus Lines operates two routes to and from Hampton station, under contract to Public Transport Victoria:

- 708 : to Carrum station
- 828 : to Berwick station
