= Hoppers Crossing railway station =

Railway station in Melbourne, Australia

Hoppers Crossing
- Westbound view from Platform 1, November 2026

General information
- Location: Old Geelong Road, Hoppers Crossing, Victoria 3029; City of Wyndham; Australia
- Coordinates: 37°53′00″S 144°42′04″E
- System: PTV commuter rail station
- Owner: VicTrack
- Operator: Metro Trains
- Line: Werribee
- Distance: 27.67 kilometres from Southern Cross
- Platforms: 2 (1 island)
- Tracks: 2
- Connections: Bus

Construction
- Structure type: Ground
- Parking: 240
- Cycle facilities: 8
- Accessible: Yes—step free access

Other information
- Status: Operational, host station
- Station code: HCG
- Fare zone: Myki zone 2
- Website: Public Transport Victoria

History
- Opened: 16 November 1970; 55 years ago
- Rebuilt: 8 July 1983; February 2022
- Electrified: November 1983 (1500 V DC overhead)

Passengers
- 2005–2006: 829,716
- 2006–2007: 983,778 ▲18.56%
- 2007–2008: 1,133,838 ▲15.25%
- 2008–2009: 1,132,546 ▼0.11%
- 2009–2010: 1,148,015 ▲1.36%
- 2010–2011: 1,295,814 ▲12.87%
- 2011–2012: 1,334,919 ▲3.01%
- 2012–2013: Not measured
- 2013–2014: 1,357,369 ▲1.68%
- 2014–2015: 1,379,462 ▲1.62%
- 2015–2016: 1,157,496 ▼16.09%
- 2016–2017: 1,148,247 ▼0.79%
- 2017–2018: 1,179,409 ▲2.71%
- 2018–2019: 1,246,950 ▲5.72%
- 2019–2020: 1,079,900 ▼13.39%
- 2020–2021: 349,850 ▼67.6%
- 2021–2022: 436,400 ▲24.73%
- 2022–2023: 738,900 ▲69.32%
- 2023–2024: 897,300 ▲21.44%
- 2024–2025: 925,850 ▲3.18%

Services
Preceding station	Metro Trains	Following station
Williams Landing towards Sandringham via Flinders Street	Werribee line	Werribee Terminus
Track layout
Location

Hoppers Crossing station is a railway station operated by Metro Trains Melbourne on the Werribee line, part of the Melbourne rail network. It serves the western suburb of Hoppers Crossing, in Melbourne, Victoria, Australia. Hoppers Crossing station is a ground level host station, featuring an island platform, it opened on 16 November 1970, with the current platforms provided in 1983 and the footbridge in 2022.

The Western standard gauge line, which operates between Melbourne and Adelaide, passes to the north of Platform 1.

== History ==
The station's name matches that of the locality on which the suburb was built. Elizabeth Hopper was a gatekeeper, closing and re-opening a set of large timber level crossing gates whenever a train passed through. She and her husband, Stephen Hopper (1832-1908), a railway ganger, lived nearby with their eleven children.

The original station was located on the down (Werribee) side of the former Old Geelong Road level crossing. Problems with stationary trains blocking the level crossing led to the station being relocated to the up (Flinders Street) side of the crossing in July 1983, in conjunction with the electrification of the line to Werribee. Also in that year, boom barriers were provided at the former level crossing.

On 4 May 2010, as part of the 2010/2011 State Budget, $83.7 million was allocated to upgrade Hoppers Crossing to a premium station, along with nineteen others. However, in March 2011, this was scrapped by the Baillieu Government.

The crossing was removed as part of the Level Crossing Removal Project, and was replaced with a road overpass 800m to the east of the crossing, directly connecting Old Geelong Road with the Princes Highway. Construction began in February 2021 and, on 9 December of that year, the new road bridge opened to traffic. The level crossing was closed to road traffic on the same day, and was replaced with a pedestrian overpass, which opened in February 2022.

== Platforms and services ==
Hoppers Crossing has one island platform with two faces. It is served by Werribee line trains.

Hoppers Crossing platform arrangement
Platform	Line	Destination	Via	Service Type	Notes	Source
1	Werribee line	Flinders Street or Sandringham	Flinders Street	Limited Express services	Weekdays only	
1	Werribee line	Sandringham	Altona and Flinders Street	All stations		
2	Werribee line	Werribee		All stations		

== Transport links ==
CDC Melbourne operates seven bus routes via Hoppers Crossing station, under contract to Public Transport Victoria:

- 153 : Williams Landing station – Werribee station
- 160 : to Tarneit station
- 161 : to Werribee station
- 166 : to Wyndham Vale station
- 167 : to Tarneit station
- 181 : to Werribee station
- 498 : to Laverton station
