= Williams Landing railway station =

Railway station in Melbourne, Australia

Williams Landing
- Eastbound view from Platform 1, November 2026

General information
- Location: Palmers Road, Williams Landing, Victoria 3027; City of Wyndham; Australia
- Coordinates: 37°52′13″S 144°44′49″E
- System: PTV commuter rail station
- Owner: VicTrack
- Operator: Metro Trains
- Line: Werribee
- Distance: 23.20 kilometres from Southern Cross
- Platforms: 2 (1 island)
- Tracks: 2
- Connections: Bus

Construction
- Structure type: Ground
- Parking: Yes
- Cycle facilities: Yes (Parkiteer bicycle cage)
- Accessible: Yes

Other information
- Status: Operational, premium station
- Station code: WLD
- Fare zone: Myki zone 2
- Website: Public Transport Victoria

History
- Opened: 28 April 2013; 13 years ago
- Electrified: November 1983 (1500 V DC overhead)

Passengers
- 2013–2014: 808,525
- 2014–2015: 1,090,367 ▲34.85%
- 2015–2016: 1,345,743 ▲23.42%
- 2016–2017: 1,417,348 ▲5.32%
- 2017–2018: 1,568,181 ▲10.64%
- 2018–2019: 1,756,650 ▲12.01%
- 2019–2020: 1,419,700 ▼19.18%
- 2020–2021: 411,450 ▼71.01%
- 2021–2022: 633,400 ▲53.94%

Services
Preceding station	Metro Trains	Following station
Aircraft towards Sandringham via Flinders Street	Werribee line	Hoppers Crossing towards Werribee
Track layout
Location

Williams Landing station is a railway station operated by Metro Trains Melbourne on the Werribee line, part of the Melbourne rail network. It serves the western suburb of Williams Landing, in Melbourne, Victoria, Australia. Williams Landing station is a ground level premium station, featuring an island platform. It opened on 28 April 2013.

The Western standard gauge line passes to the north of Platform 1.

== History ==
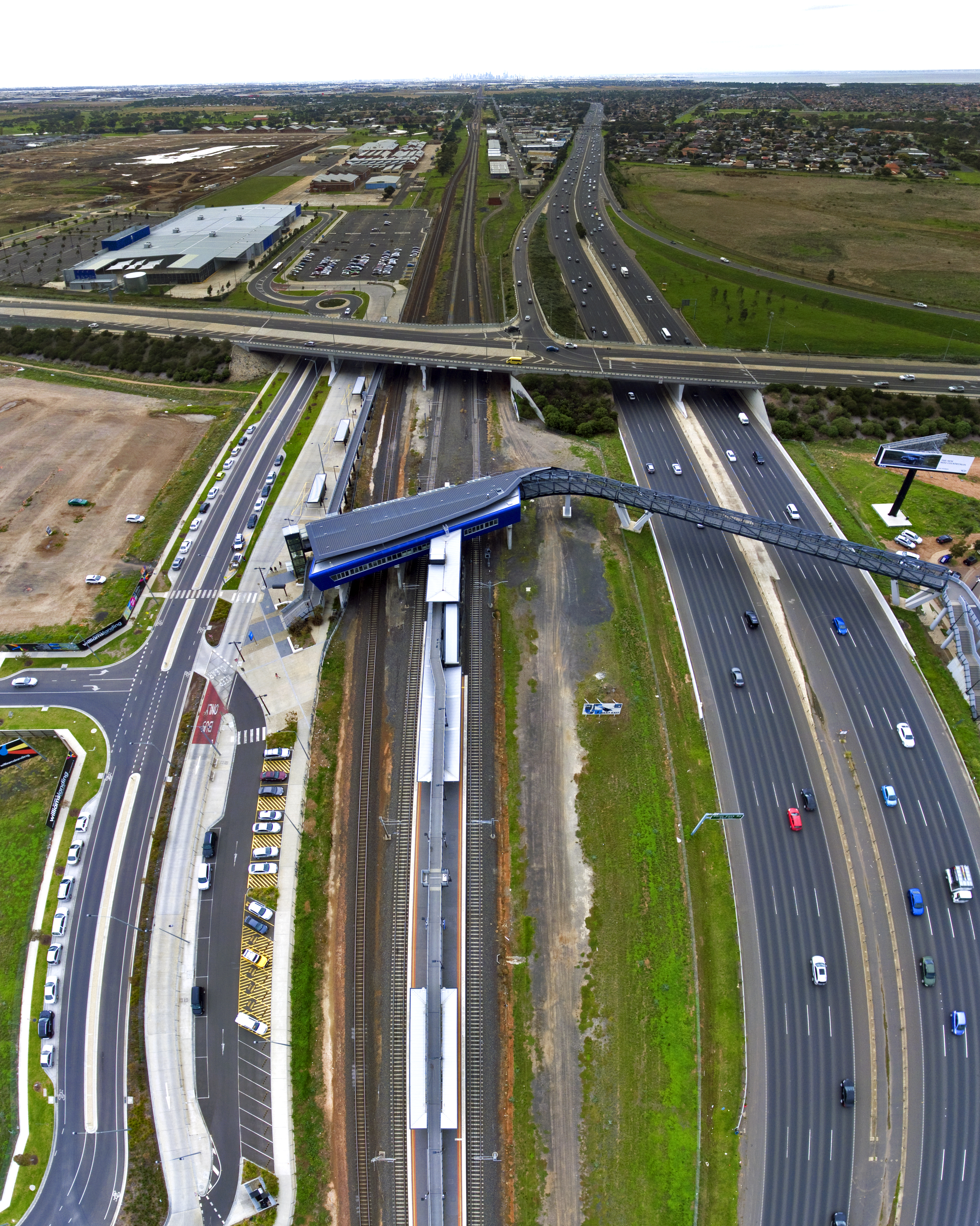
Aerial photo of Williams Landing station, May 2017

In 2008, the State Government announced the station in the Victorian Transport Plan. Construction was originally intended to commence during 2010, but eventually started in September 2011, with the station opening on 28 April 2013. Construction of the station required the slewing of the existing southern track to make room for the new island platform.

The cost of the station in 2011 was budgeted at $86 million for the station and $24 million for associated road works, including a road overpass over the line. The cost was criticised by the Public Transport Users Association as being too high.

Like the suburb itself, the station was named after the nearby RAAF Williams base, itself named after Sir Richard Williams, an RAAF Chief of Air Force, and the Director General of Civil Aviation between 1946 and 1955.

In late 2025, the State Government announced that a new elevator would be built on the Wallace Avenue side of the station overpass to improve passenger accessibility, with other minor upgrades around the station.

== Platforms and services ==
Williams Landing has one island platform with two faces. It is served by Werribee line trains.

Williams Landing platform arrangement
Platform	Line	Destination	Via	Service Type	Notes	Source
1	Werribee line	Flinders Street or Sandringham	Flinders Street	Limited Express services	Weekdays only	
1	Werribee line	Sandringham	Altona and Flinders Street	All stations		
2	Werribee line	Werribee		All stations		

== Transport links ==
CDC Melbourne operates seven bus routes to and from Williams Landing station, under contract to Public Transport Victoria:

- 150 : to Tarneit station
- 151 : to Tarneit station
- 152 : to Tarneit station
- 153 : to Werribee station
- 494 : to Point Cook South
- 495 : to Point Cook South
- 497 : to Saltwater Coast Estate (Point Cook)

Transit Systems Victoria operates one bus route to and from Williams Landing station, under contract to Public Transport Victoria:

- Night Bus 949 : to Altona Meadows (Saturday and Sunday mornings only)
