= Williamstown Racecourse railway station =

Railway station in Victoria, Australia

Williamstown Racecourse
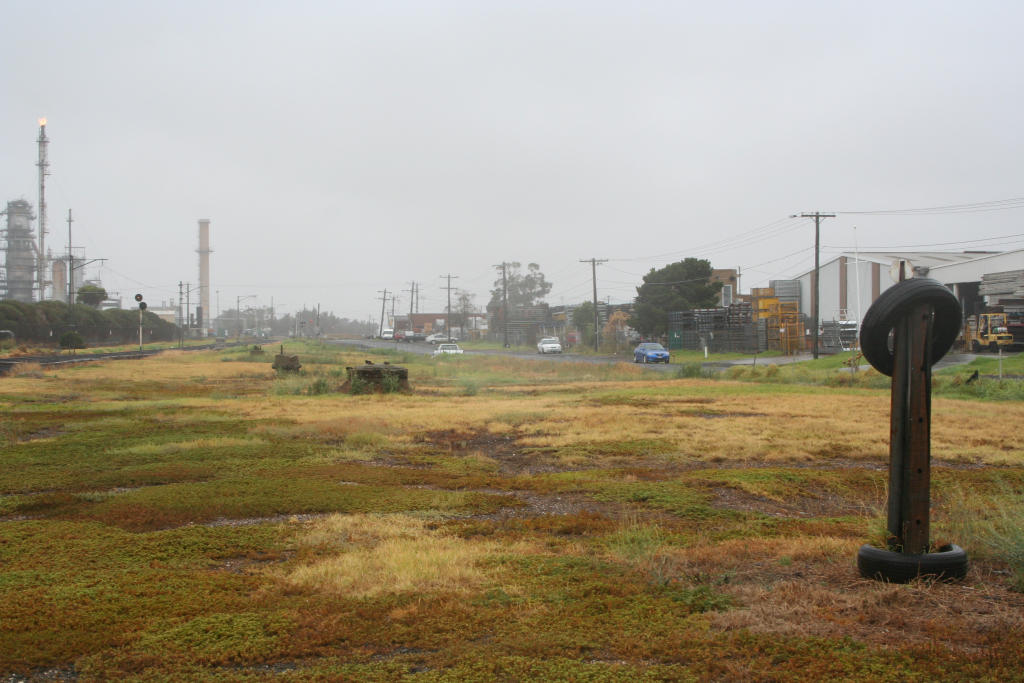
- Stanchion bases (since removed) at the station site in 2008

General information
- Coordinates: 37°51′20″S 144°51′7″E
- Line: Altona
- Distance: 14.3 kilometres from Southern Cross
- Platforms: 2 (1 island)
- Tracks: 2

Other information
- Status: Demolished

History
- Opened: 6 April 1885
- Closed: 22 May 1950
- Electrified: 27 August 1920

Former services
Preceding station	Disused railways	Following station
Newport towards Flinders Street	Altona line	Terminus
Location

Williamstown Racecourse is a demolished station on the Altona line (now part of the Werribee line) in Melbourne, Australia. It was located in the suburb of Altona, immediately south of the Kororoit Creek Road level crossing and north of Kororoit Creek.

== History ==
The station was opened in 1885 as the terminus of a 1.1 km branch from the main Geelong line, serving the adjacent Williamstown Racecourse. In 1888, the line was extended to Altona Beach by a private land development company, branching from the station yard on its western side.

The station was a terminus, and had no connection towards Altona. It consisted of an island platform, signal box, two run-around roads, and a number of sidings. The line to the station was electrified in 1920 as part of the Melbourne suburban electrification scheme. Shortly after the start of World War II, the racecourse was taken over by the government for military purposes and did not reopen after the war, although the overhead equipment at the station remained until 1950.

== See also ==
- "Rail Geelong - Williamstown Racecourse Station". railgeelong.com.
- "Rail Geelong - Altona Line Guide". railgeelong.com.
