= Werribee line =

Passenger rail service in metropolitan Melbourne, Victoria, Australia

Werribee

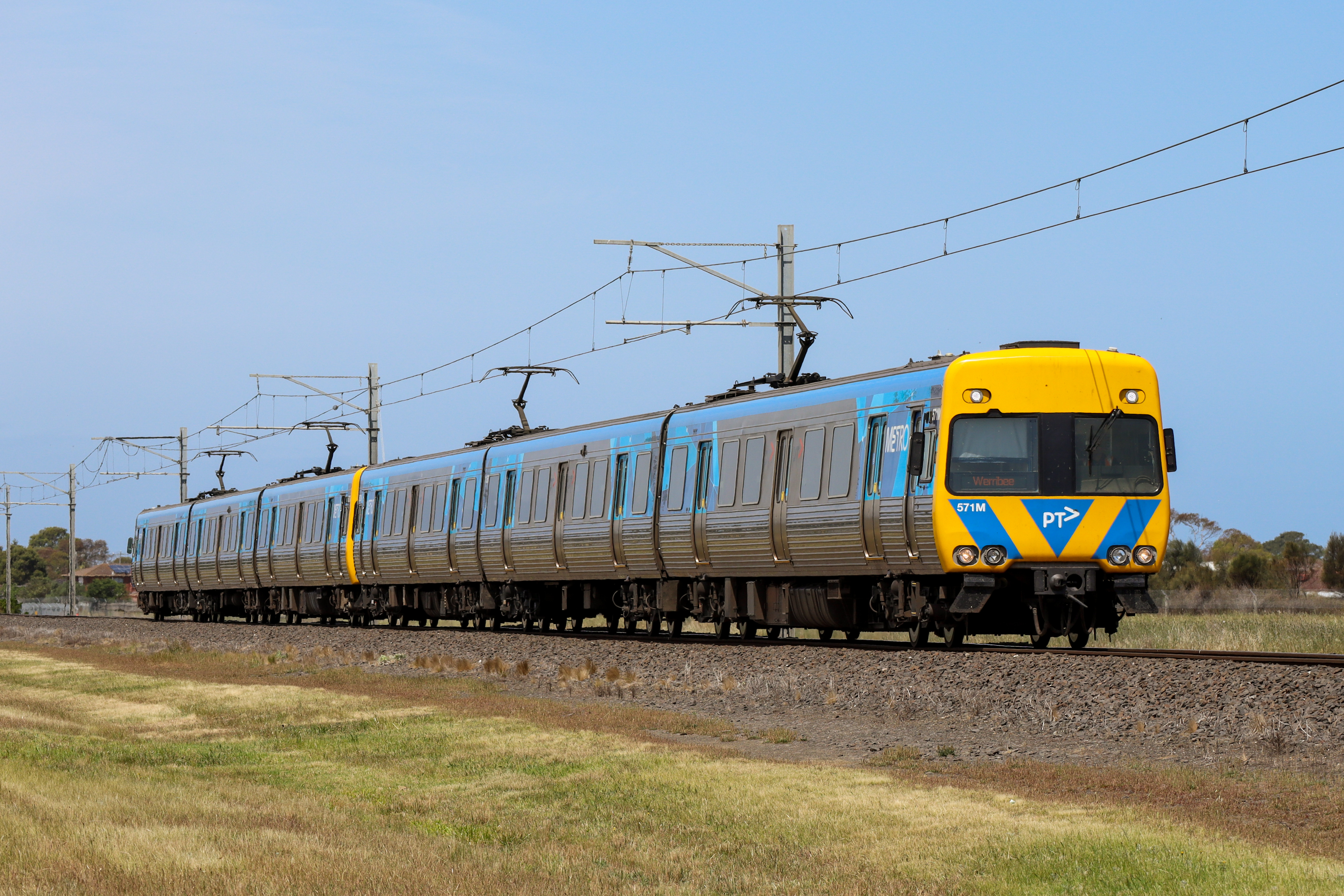
- An Alstom Comeng on the Werribee line between Westona and Laverton stations, November 2023

Overview
- Service type: Commuter rail
- System: Melbourne railway network
- Status: Operational
- Locale: Melbourne, Victoria, Australia
- Predecessor: Geelong (1857–1983); Williamstown Racecourse (1885–1920); Altona Beach (1888–1890); Altona Beach (1917–1926); Williamstown Racecourse ^ (1920–1940); Altona Beach ^ (1926–1938); Altona ^ (1938–1985)^ are electric services
- First service: 25 June 1857; 169 years ago
- Current operator: Metro Trains
- Former operators: Geelong and Melbourne Railway (G&MR) (1857–1860); Victorian Railways (VR) (1860–1974); Altona Beach Estates (1888–1890); VR as VicRail (1974–1983); MTA (The Met) (1983–1989); PTC (The Met) (1989–1998); Bayside Trains (1998–2000); M>Train (2000–2004); Connex Melbourne (2004–2009)

Route
- Termini: Flinders Street; Werribee
- Stops: 17
- Distance travelled: 32.9 km (20.4 mi) (via Altona)
- Average journey time: 39 minutes (direct); 49 minutes (via Altona)
- Service frequency: 20 minutes weekdays to Laverton via Altona; 4–15 minutes weekdays peak to Werribee direct; 20 minutes weekdays off-peak to Werribee direct; 20 minutes at nights and weekends to Werribee via Altona; 60 minutes early weekend mornings to Werribee via Altona; 10 minute frequency daytime between Flinders Street and Newport in combination with Williamstown line
- Lines used: Altona, Warrnambool

Technical
- Rolling stock: Comeng, Siemens, X'Trapolis 100
- Track gauge: 1,600 mm (5 ft 3 in)
- Electrification: 1500 V DC overhead
- Track owner: VicTrack

The Werribee line is a commuter railway line in the city of Melbourne, Victoria, Australia. Operated by Metro Trains Melbourne, it is the city's ninth longest metropolitan railway line at 32.9 kilometres (20.4 mi).

The line runs from Flinders Street station in central Melbourne to Werribee station in the south-west, serving 17 stations via Footscray, Newport and Laverton. Unusually amongst Melbourne's suburban lines, the Werribee line splits into two routes between Newport and Laverton: a single-track branch through Altona (known as the Altona loop or the Altona line), and a direct express route which bypasses Altona and has no intermediate stations. The line operates for approximately 19 hours a day (from approximately 5:00 am to around 12:00 am) with 24 hour service available on Friday and Saturday nights. During peak hour, headways of 10 minutes are operated with services every 20 minutes during off-peak hours. Trains on the Werribee line run with a two three-car formation of Comeng and Siemens Nexas trainsets.

Part of the line initially opened in 1857 by the Geelong and Melbourne Railway Company. The line was progressively finished within the next two years, allowing trains to travel from Melbourne to Geelong. In April 1885, a short branch was opened off the Werribee line just past Newport to Williamstown Racecourse, and in November 1888, a branch was opened off the Racecourse branch to Altona, terminating at a station named Altona Beach. The construction of these lines played important parts in the development of Geelong and Melbourne's west during the 19th and 20th centuries, with the line continuing to be an important asset in the 21st century.

Since the 2010s, due to the heavily utilised infrastructure of the Werribee line, improvements and upgrades have been made. Works have included replacing sleepers, upgrading signalling technology, the removal of level crossings, planning for new infrastructure, the introduction of new rolling stock, and station accessibility upgrades.

Until February 2026, the Werribee line (and Williamstown line) was through routed with the Frankston line and was coloured green. On 1 February 2026, Frankston line trains returned to the City Loop. As a result, the Werribee lines terminated at Flinders Street Station as a temporary arrangement, with no services continuing beyond Flinders Street. The colour of the line was also changed to pink, the same colour as the Sandringham line. Since 23 August 2026, the Werribee line is through routed with the Sandringham line.

== History ==
=== 19th century ===
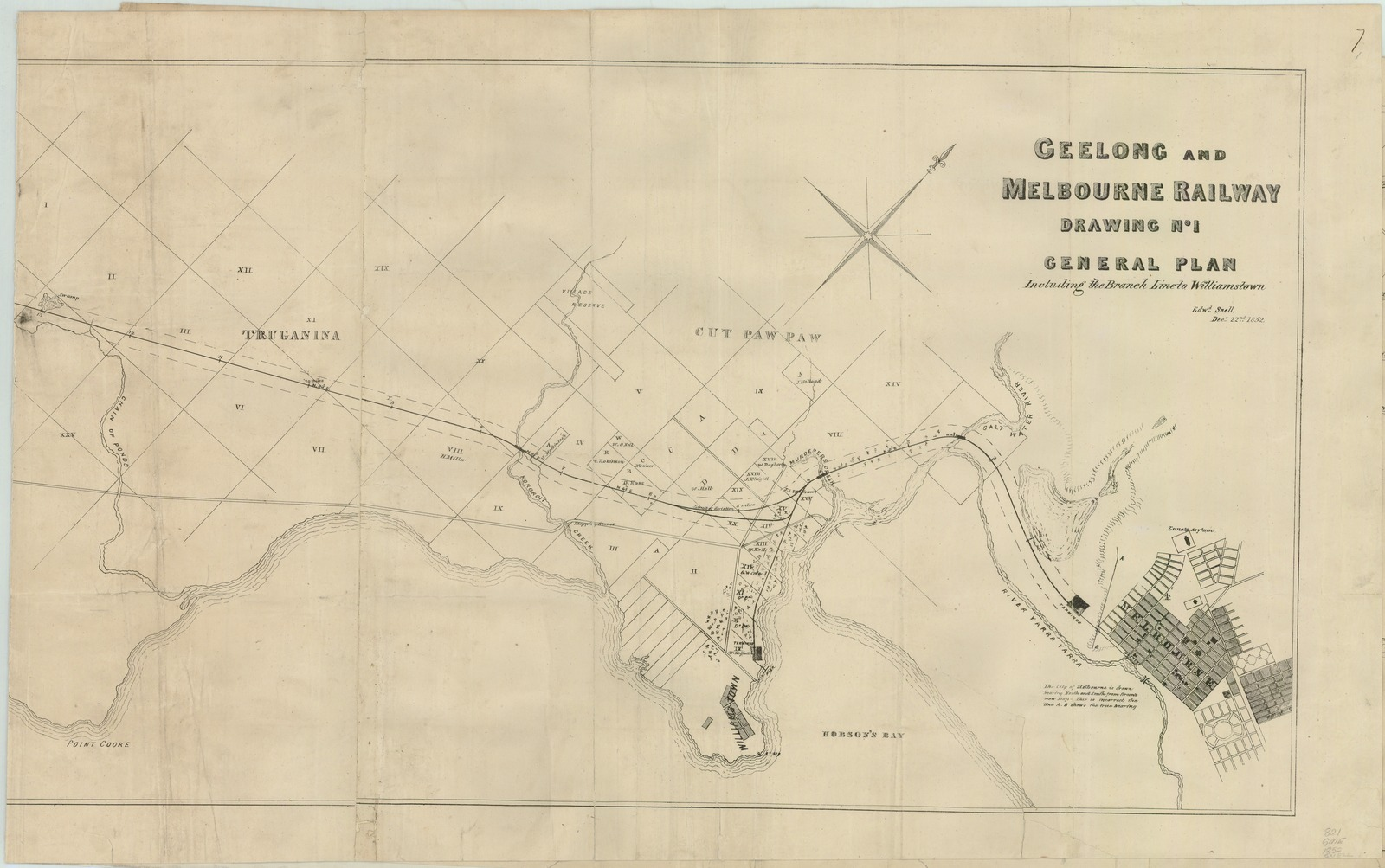
The original plans for the Geelong and Melbourne Railway Company's lines to Geelong/Werribee and Williamstown

In 1857, the Geelong and Melbourne Railway Company (G&MRC) opened the Werribee to Little River section of the line they were building between Newport and Geelong, then in June of that year, they opened the section between Werribee and a temporary station near Newport, known as Greenwich. The intention was to connect to the Williamstown line being built by the Melbourne, Mount Alexander and Murray River Railway Company, with whom they had arranged permission to run the former company's trains over the latter company's tracks to Melbourne, but the Williamstown line was not yet ready.

However, by October 1857, construction of the Williamstown line had sufficiently advanced to allow the Geelong trains to run to the terminus at Williamstown Pier, so Greenwich station was closed and a connection was made to the Williamstown line towards Williamstown. From Williamstown Pier, passengers could connect to a ferry across Hobsons Bay to Port Melbourne.

The Williamstown line fully opened in January 1859, so the connection near Newport towards Williamstown was removed and replaced with a connection to Newport, and the through running of Geelong trains to Melbourne commenced.

In April 1885, a short branch was opened off the Werribee line just past Newport to Williamstown Racecourse, and in November 1888, a branch was opened off the Racecourse branch to Altona, terminating at a station named Altona Beach. This branch was opened by the Altona and Laverton Bay Freehold and Investment Company to encourage people to buy their land in the area. However, the line closed less than two years later, in August 1890.

=== 20th century ===
A portion of the Altona Beach line near Williamstown Racecourse was leased by the Victorian Railways (VR) in 1906 to store race trains. Sometime between 1911 and 1919, the line reopened for goods trains with a siding built from Altona Beach to the Melbourne and Altona Colliery Company mine. From November 1917, the VR worked on the line on behalf of the then owners, Altona Beach Estates Ltd., but to a relocated Altona Beach station, short of the original terminus.

The VR electrified the Williamstown line and the branch to Williamstown Racecourse in August 1920. In October 1924, the VR took total control of the Altona Beach line, and electrified it in October 1926. Automatic Block Signalling was commissioned between South Kensington and Yarraville in August 1927, and then on to Newport. The Automatic and Track Control system was installed from Newport South towards Geelong, enabling bidirectional use of the then single track line.

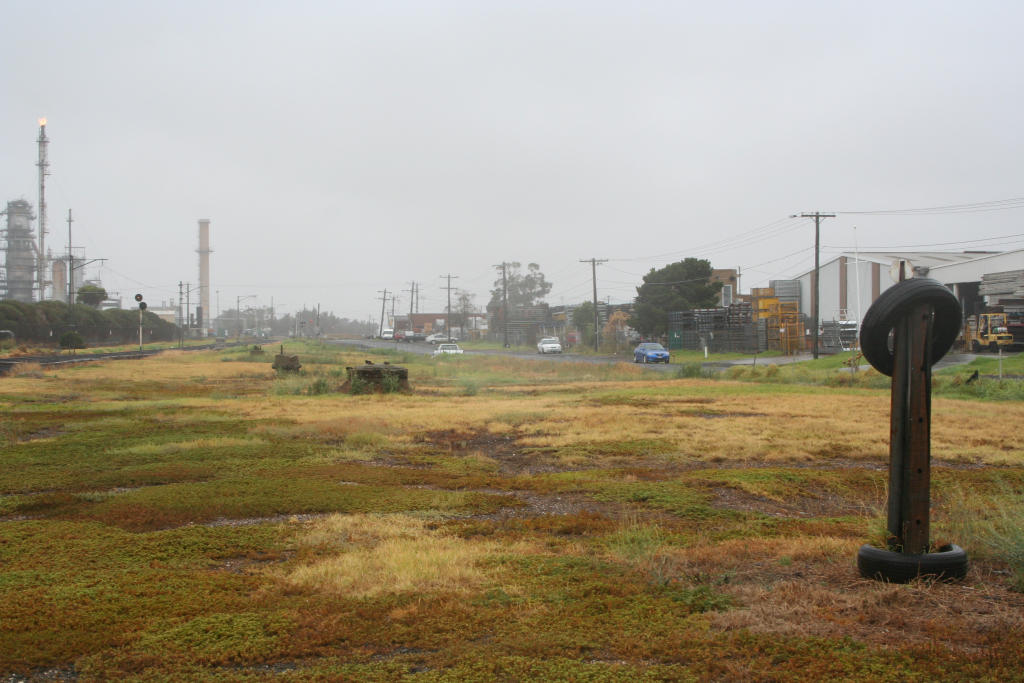
The site of the former Williamstown Racecourse station, 2008.

The Williamstown Racecourse branch closed in May 1950. Duplication of the Werribee line occurred in stages between 1960 and 1968, with the Altona branch converted to Automatic Block Signalling in October 1967. First announced by the Transport Minister Joe Rafferty in 1977, the line from Altona Junction to Werribee was electrified in September 1983.

By the early 1980s, the Altona line was under threat of closure, as recommended in the Lonie Report. In October 1981, the rail service was drastically cut, with all shuttle services withdrawn, and only two morning and evening trains being operated to and from Melbourne. However, a change of state government in 1982 saw the restitution of many services in July of that year. On 21 January 1985, the line was extended to Westona, which served as the terminus until April of that year when the line was extended to Laverton. When the Altona line was extended to Laverton, it was integrated into the Werribee line, becoming the Altona loop. At the same time as the extension to Laverton, the line from Altona to Westona, which had temporarily been operated by Staff and Ticket safeworking, was converted to Automatic and Track Control.

=== 21st century ===
In November 2008, a major timetable change took place on the Craigieburn, Sydenham, Upfield and Werribee lines. This change saw all Werribee services during weekday peak periods altered to run direct to and from Flinders Street as a result of train overcrowding in the Northern Loop in years prior. This was part of a wider City Loop timetable restructuring.

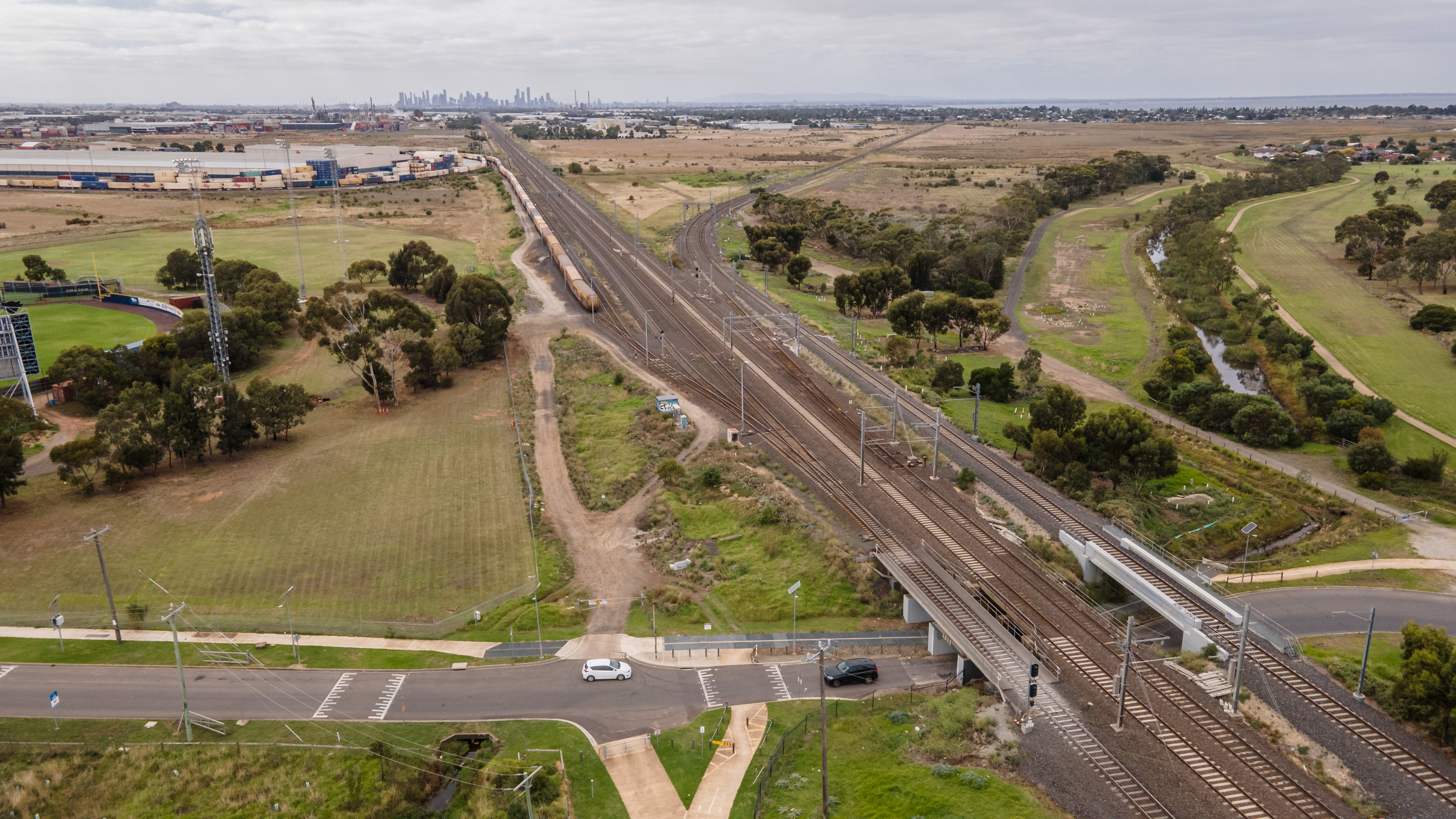
Sections of the Werribee Line operate through undeveloped land, such as this section through Altona Meadows

Since the completion of the Altona Loop, almost every Werribee bound service ran via Altona, but a timetable re-write in May 2011 saw this section converted to a separate service for the majority of the time. The rewrite introduced the controversial practice of having trains serving the Altona Loop run as a shuttle service between Laverton and Newport during off peak hours. Shuttle services were ended in August 2017, with weekday direct services to and from the city being reinstated to the Altona Loop.

Also as part of a new timetable in May 2011. The remainder of weekday Werribee line services were altered to run direct to and from Flinders Street and across to the Frankston line as part of the formation of the new 'Cross City Group'. With Werribee services now bypassing Altona. frequencies in peak periods were increased to every 10-11 minutes, up from every 15. Although all weekday services no longer operated via the City Loop, all weekend services continued to run through the loop until 2021.

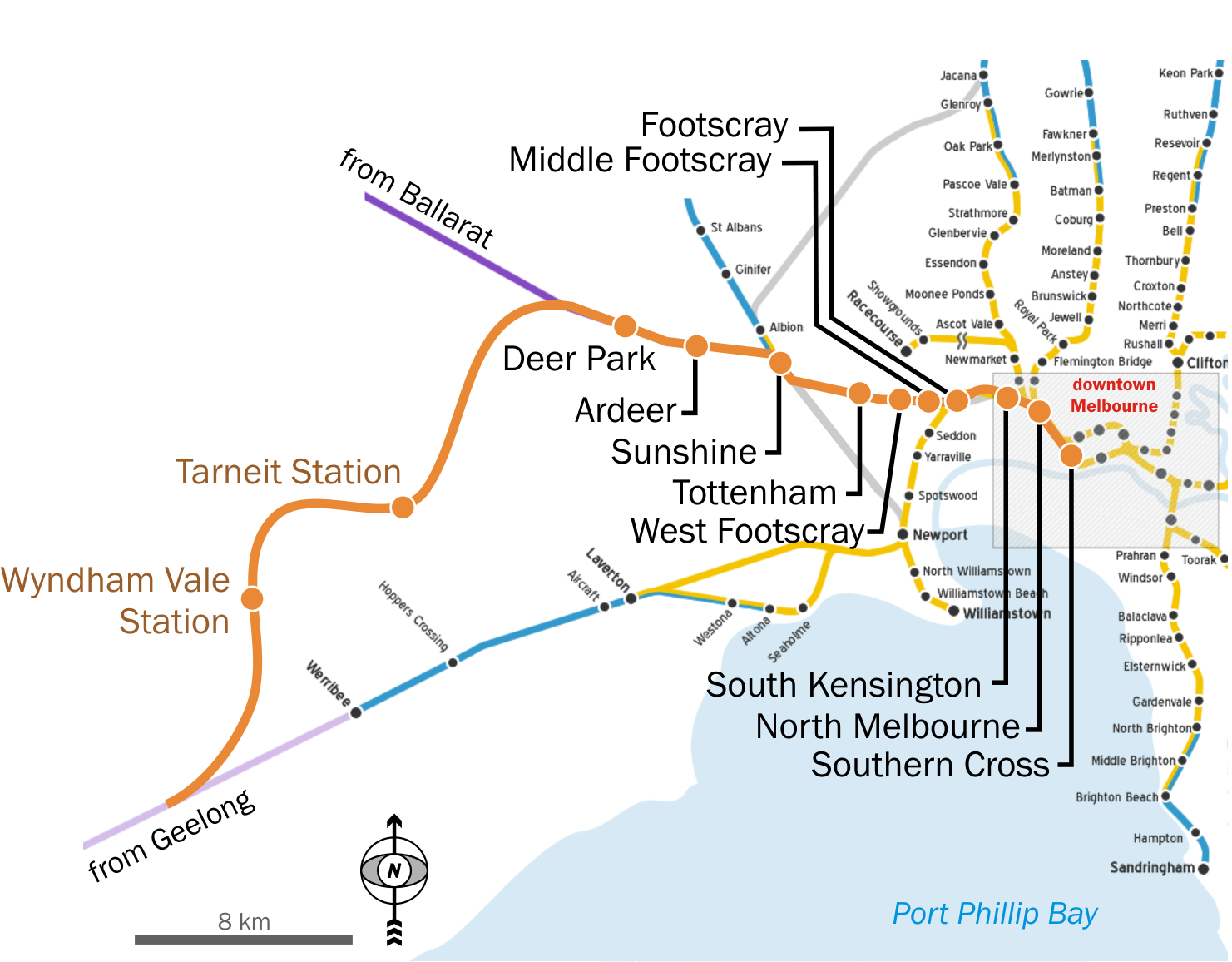
The completion of the Regional Rail Link in 2015 brought numerous benefits to the operations on the Werribee line.

In June 2015, the completion of the Regional Rail Link allowed for the rerouting of Geelong and Warrnambool services via the 90 km of new track constructed between Little River and Deer Park stations. Instead of stopping at select stations on the Werribee line, services now stop at new stations at Wyndham Vale and Tarneit which are in Melbourne's growing western suburbs. The separation of suburban and regional trains has reduced overcrowding, increased capacity, and improved service reliability on the Werribee line in addition to the benefits seen on Geelong services.

In January 2021, as part of another major timetable, frequencies across the week were heavily improved. Wait times on weekend mornings and late nights were brought down from every half hour to every twenty minutes. Services to Laverton and Williamstown were altered to stop at South Kensington station in place of Werribee express services on weekdays as well as Werribee local services on weekends. This change also saw weekend Werribee line services removed from the City Loop and altered to run direct to Flinders Street and onwards to Frankston like was already the case on weekdays.

As part of the 'Big Switch' timetable change in February 2026, through running from Werribee to Frankston ceased with the Frankston line returning to the City Loop. As a result of this change, the Werribee line was altered to only run to and from Flinders Street direct with select services at certain times continuing instead towards Sandringham.

On 6 August 2026, the Victorian state government announced that the Werribee and Williamstown lines would begin through running to Sandringham full time instead of only late at night. This timetable change took effect on 23 August 2026.

== Future ==
=== Level crossing removals ===
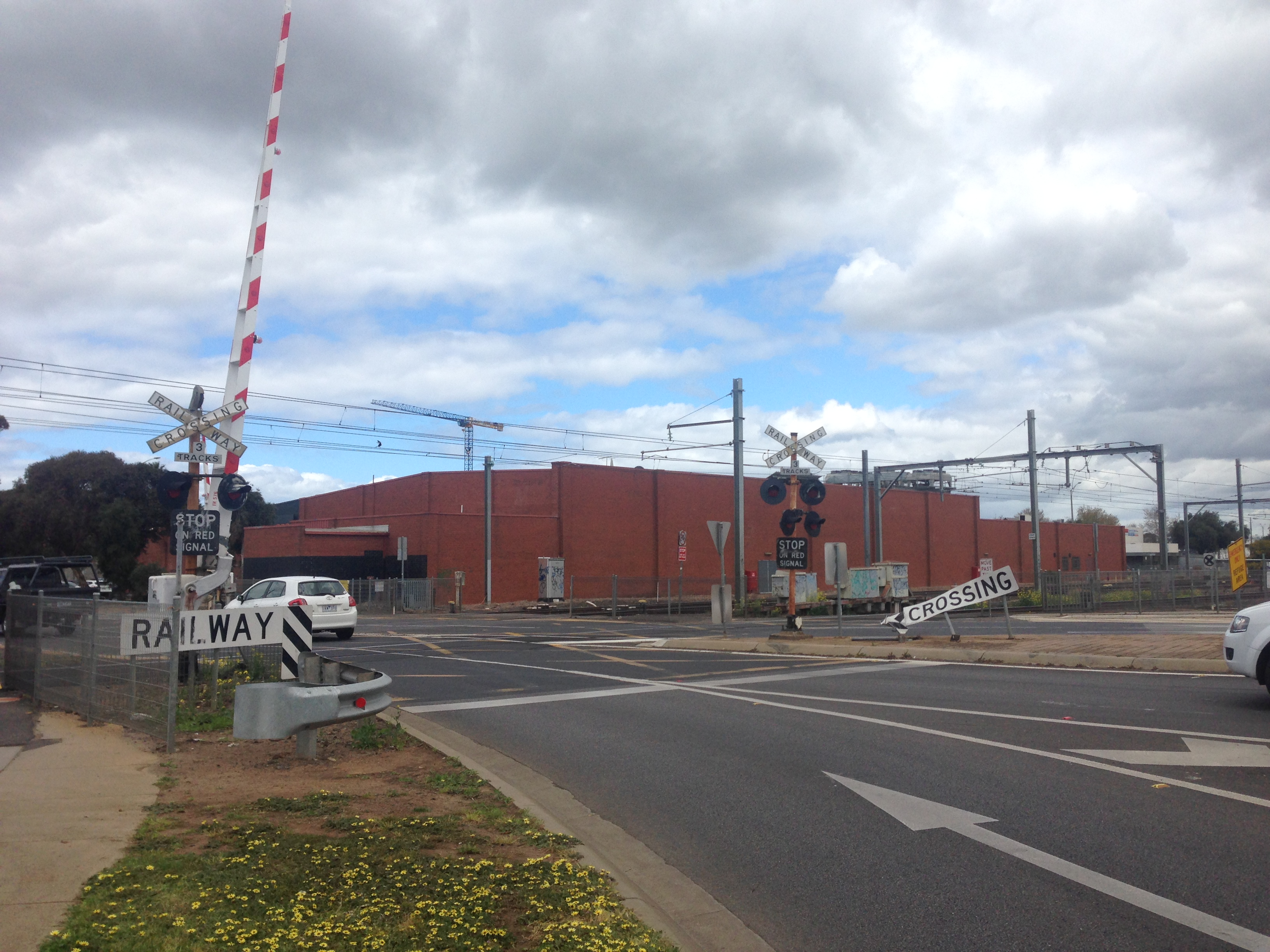
The Cherry Street level crossing in Werribee prior to its 2021 removal.

The Level Crossing Removal Project has announced the removal of all remaining level crossings on the Werribee line, to be completed in stages from 2018 to 2030. In 2018, one level crossing was removed at Kororoit Creek Road, Williamstown North. The crossing was removed by raising the rail line onto a rail bridge above the road with partial duplication of the Altona Loop completed as part of the project. In 2019, another level crossing was removed at Aviation Road, Laverton. The crossing was removed by raising the road onto a bridge above the rail line with upgrades to Aircraft station in conjunction with the project. The upgrades included a redesigned station forecourt and construction of a new pedestrian underpass. In 2021, a total of 3 level crossings were removed at various locations along the line. Crossings were removed at Old Geelong Road in Hoppers Crossing and Werribee Street and Cherry Street in Werribee. Two of these crossings were removed with road bridges and one with a rail bridge. The removal of the crossing at Old Geelong Road in Hoppers Crossing also included an upgrade to Hoppers Crossing station with a new overpass, station forecourt, and bus interchange. The final five crossings along the line (excluding the ones on the Altona Loop) will be removed by 2030. The crossing at Hudsons Road, Spotswood and Maddox Road, Newport will be removed by constructing two separate rail bridges with a new Spotswood station also being built. In addition, the crossing at Maidstone Street will be removed with the construction of a road bridge and two crossings—Anderson Street and Champion Road—will be closed off. At the end of these works, the Werribee line will be fully level crossing free by 2030.

=== Melbourne Metro 2 ===
The indicative alignment of the Melbourne Metro 2.

The 2012 Network Development Plan identified the need for an east-west tunnel connecting the Werribee (and potentially) the Geelong line to the Mernda line. The project would split the Mernda line from the Hurstbridge line after Clifton Hill into a new tunnel, travelling east stopping at a new station in the "inner north", before connecting with at Parkville, Flagstaff, and Southern Cross stations. Exiting the CBD, the line would continue in a tunnel stopping at a new station in the suburb of Fishermans Bend, before crossing underneath the Yarra River and arriving at Newport station. The line would then exit the tunnel and travel further west to connect with the Werribee line bypassing the Altona Loop. The Werribee and Williamstown lines will be reconfigured to provide better and simpler service. This project was initially meant to be completed in the 2020s, however, no funding or planning has taken place, with the revised Victorian Rail Plan stating that the project would be completed under Stage 6 of the plan.

As part of the Melbourne Metro 2, the Werribee and Williamstown lines would be reconfigured to provide simpler service. The Sandringham line would continue running to Williamstown with the line also travelling to and terminating at Laverton via the Altona Loop. Express services (not via the Altona Loop) would instead be served by trains exiting the Melbourne Metro 2 tunnel towards Werribee (and potentially Geelong).

=== Geelong Fast Rail ===
The Western Rail Plan is a plan that aims to improve the quality of rail services in Melbourne's western suburbs through infrastructure upgrades on a range of metropolitan and regional lines. Geelong Fast Rail was one project identified in the Western Rail Plan as a matter of priority, as it would allow for Geelong and Warrnambool services to travel back via the Werribee line, cutting travel time and allowing electrification of other corridors to occur which are currently being served exclusively by V/Line trains. Phase 1 of Geelong Fast Rail will consist of the following projects aimed at cutting travel times by 15 minutes:

- New track between Werribee and Laverton dedicated to regional services
- Upgrades and widening of bridges over main roads, creeks, and rivers
- Upgraded stations at Werribee and Laverton
- Signalling and train control system upgrades

Construction on the project expected to get underway in 2023, with the Australian and Victorian governments committing $2 billion each to the project which is expected to create 2800 new jobs.

== Network and operations ==
=== Services ===
Services on the Werribee line operates from approximately 5:00 am to around 12:00 am daily. In general, during peak hours, train frequency is 5–15 minutes (reduced frequencies on the Altona Loop) while services during non-peak hours drops to 20 minutes throughout the entire route. In combination with the Willamstown line, frequencies are boosted between Newport and Flinders Street. The Night Network operates on Friday nights and weekends, with services running 24 hours a day, with 60 minute frequencies available outside of normal operating hours.

Services on the line do not run through the City Loop. On weekdays daytime, limited express services run between Werribee and Flinders Street and terminate there, bypassing the Altona loop, while the all stops services run between Laverton and Flinders Street via the Altona loop and then continue onto the Sandringham line. At weekdays nighttime and on weekends, the all stop services run and stop at all stations along the entire line between Werribee and Flinders Street, before continuing onto the Sandringham line. Some shuttle services also run between Newport and Flinders Street during the peaks.

Train services on the Werribee line are also subjected to maintenance and renewal works, usually on selected Fridays and Saturdays. Shuttle bus services are provided throughout the duration of works for affected commuters.

==== Stopping patterns ====
Legend — Station status

- ◼ Premium Station – Station staffed from first to last train
- ◻ Host Station – Usually staffed during morning peak, however this can vary for different stations on the network.

Legend — Stopping patterns
Services do not operate via the City Loop

- ● – All trains stop
- ◐ – Some services do not stop - Weekend night network services do not stop at Southern Cross
- ▼ – Only inbound trains stop
- | – Trains pass and do not stop

==== Guide ====
===== Weekdays =====
- Services to Werribee stop at Southern Cross, North Melbourne, Footscray, Newport, Laverton then all stations to Werribee

- Services to Laverton stop at all stations via Altona from Sandringham (Before 7pm)

- Services stop at all stations via Altona (After 7pm only)

===== Weekends =====
- All Services stop at all stations via Altona

===== Night Network =====
- All Services stop at all stations except Southern Cross via Altona

Werribee Services
Station	Zone	Local	Express	Laverton	Newport
◼ Flinders Street	1	●	●	●	▲
◼ Southern Cross	1	◐	●	●	▲
◼ North Melbourne	1	●	●	●	▲
South Kensington	1	●	I	●	▲
◼ Footscray	1	●	●	●	▲
Seddon	1	●	I	●	▲
◻ Yarraville	1	●	I	●	▲
Spotswood	1	●	I	●	▲
◼ Newport	1	●	●	●	▲
Seaholme	1	●	I	●	
Altona	1/2	●	I	●	
Westona	1/2	●	I	●	
◼ Laverton	1/2	●	●	●	
Aircraft	2	●	●		
◼ Williams Landing	2	●	●		
◻ Hoppers Crossing	2	●	●		
◼ Werribee	2	●	●		

=== Operators ===
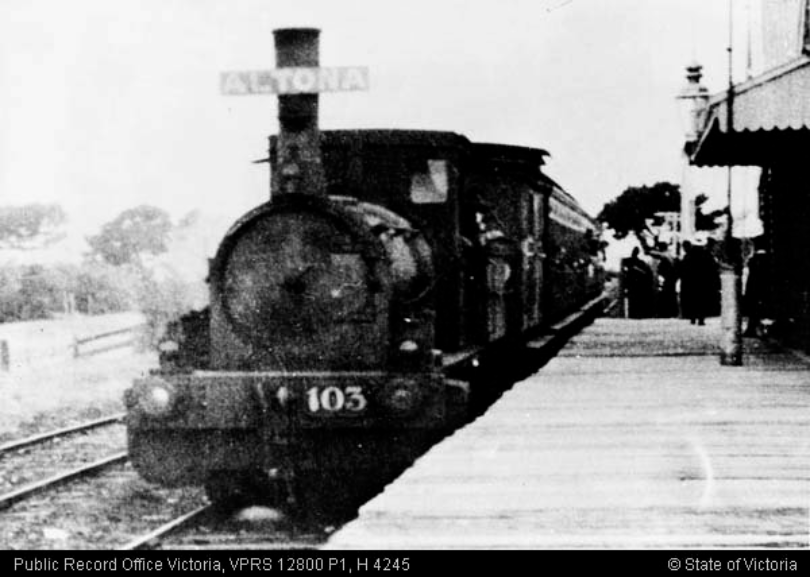
Victorian Railways operated part of the Altona branch for Altona Beach Estates between 1911 and 1924.

The Werribee line has had a total of 10 operators since its opening in 1857. Early in 1857, the Geelong and Melbourne Railway Company (G&MR) opened the Werribee to Little River section of the line they were building between Newport and Geelong. 2 years later in 1859, the government acquired the line and begun operations under the newly formed Victorian Railways (VR). The railway to Altona was constructed by the Altona Beach Estate Company, a private land developer, and opened on 9 November 1888 to a station named Altona Beach, which was about a kilometre to the east of the current station. As a result of the collapse of the 1880s Land Boom, regular services to Altona Beach ceased after August 1890, and the Victorian Government declined the offer of the owners to gift it the line. In 1917, the owners of the estate entered into an agreement with the Victorian Railways (VR) to provide a regular passenger service, having guaranteed to cover any operating losses. The majority of operations throughout its history have been government run: from its government acquisition in 1859 until the 1999 privatisation of Melbourne's rail network, four different government operators have run the line. These operators, Victorian Railways, the Metropolitan Transit Authority, the Public Transport Corporation, and Bayside Trains have a combined operational length of 140 years.

Bayside Trains was privatised in August 1999 and later rebranded M>Train. In 2002, M>Train was placed into receivership and the state government regained ownership of the line, with KPMG appointed as receivers to operate M>Train on behalf of the state government. Two years later, rival train operator Connex Melbourne took over the M>Train operations including the Williamstown line. Metro Trains Melbourne, the current private operator, then took over the operations in 2009. The private operators have had a combined operational period of 31 years.

Past and present operators of the Werribee line:
Operator	Assumed operations	Ceased operations	Length of operations
Geelong and Melbourne Railway (G&MR)	1857	1860	3 years
Victorian Railways	1860	1983	123 years
Altona Beach Estates	1888	1890	2 years
Victorian Railways for Altona Beach Estates	1911	1924	13 years
Metropolitan Transit Authority	1983	1989	6 years
Public Transport Corporation	1989	1998	9 years
Bayside Trains (government operator)	1998	2000	2 years
M>Train	2000	2004	4 years
Connex Melbourne	2004	2009	5 years
Metro Trains Melbourne	2009	incumbent	16 years (ongoing)

=== Route ===
Interactive map of the Werribee line in western Melbourne, showing the Altona loop.

Werribee (section) & Altona (physical track)

Overview
- Status: Operational with passenger services from Flinders Street to Werribee
- Owner: Geelong and Melbourne Railway (G&MR) (1857–1860); Victorian Railways (VR) (1860–1974); Altona Beach Estates (1888–1924); VR as VicRail (1974–1983); MTA (The Met) (1983–1989); PTC (The Met) (1989–1997); VicTrack (1997–Current)
- Locale: Melbourne, Victoria, Australia
- Termini: Flinders Street; Werribee
- Continues as: Port Fairy line
- Connecting lines: All metropolitan, regional, and interstate; Newport–Sunshine
- Former connections: Maribyrnong
- Stations: 17 current stations; 13 former stations; 3 sidings; 6 former sidings

Service
- Services: Werribee

History
- Work began: 25 June 1857
- Opened: Greenwich to Werribee on 25 June 1857; Southern Cross to Newport on 17 January 1859; Altona junction to Williamstown Racecourse on 6 April 1885; Racecourse junction to Altona Beach on 22 August 1888; Altona to Westona on 20 January 1985; Westona to Laverton on 11 April 1985
- Completed: 17 January 1859
- Reopened: Racecourse junction to Altona on 1 December 1917
- Electrified: Flinders Street to North Melbourne on 28 May 1919; North Melbourne to Williamstown Racecourse on 2 August 1920; Racecourse junction to Altona on 2 October 1926; Altona junction to Werribee on 27 November 1983; Altona to Westona on 20 January 1985; Westona to Laverton on 11 April 1985
- Closed: Newport to Greenwich on 18 July 1857; Racecourse junction to Altona Beach on 14 August 1890; Racecourse junction to Williamstown Racecourse on 22 May 1950

Technical
- Line length: 32.9 km (20.4 mi) (via Altona)
- Num of tracks: Six tracks – Flinders Street to Footscray; Double track: Footscray to Werribee (direct); Single track: Altona Junction to Laverton (via Altona)
- Track gauge: 1,600 mm (5 ft 3 in)
- Electrification: 1500 V DC overhead
- Operating speed: 115 km/h (71 mph) – Electric; 80 km/h (50 mph) – Diesel
- Signalling: Automatic block signalling
- Maximum incline: 1 in 40 (2.5%)

The Werribee line forms a mostly straight route from the Melbourne central business district to its terminus in Werribee. The route is 32.9 kilometres (20.4 mi) long and is fully doubled tracked from Flinders Street to its terminus, excluding during the Altona Loop. After changing from Frankston services at Flinders Street, the Werribee line traverses mainly flat country with few curves and fairly minimal earthworks for most of the line. Few sections of the line has been elevated or lowered to remove level crossings. All remaining level crossings will be removed by 2030.

The line follows the same alignment as the Williamstown line with the two services splitting onto different routes at Newport. The Werribee line continues on its south-western alignment, whereas the Williamstown line takes a southern alignment towards its final destination. Most of the rail line goes through built-up suburbs and heavy industrial areas with small pockets on non-urbanised spaces.

=== Stations ===
The line serves 17 stations across 39.2 kilometres (24.4 mi) of track. The stations are a mix of elevated, lowered, and ground level designs. The majority of elevated and lowered stations being constructed as part of level crossing removals. From 2030, Spotswood station will be elevated as part of additional level crossing removal works.

Station	Image	Accessibility	Opened	Terrain	Train connections	Other connections
Flinders Street		Yes—step free access	1854	Lowered	13 connections: * Alamein line; Belgrave line; Craigieburn line; Flemington Racecourse line; Frankston line; Gippsland line; Glen Waverley line; Hurstbridge line; Lilydale line; Mernda line; Sandringham line; Upfield line; Williamstown line	Trams Buses
Southern Cross		Yes—step free access	1859	Ground level	25 connections: * Alamein line; Albury line; Ararat line; Ballarat line; Belgrave line; Bendigo line; Craigieburn line; Echuca line; Flemington Racecourse line; Frankston line; Geelong line; Gippsland line; Glen Waverley line; Hurstbridge line; Lilydale line; Maryborough line; Mernda line; NSW TrainLink Southern; Seymour line; Shepparton line; Swan Hill line; The Overland; Upfield line; Warrnambool line; Williamstown line	Trams Buses Coaches SkyBus
North Melbourne		Yes—step free access	1859	Ground level	6 connections: * Craigieburn line; Flemington Racecourse line; Seymour line; Shepparton line; Upfield line; Williamstown line	Buses
South Kensington		No—steep ramp	1891	Ground level	1 connection: Williamstown line	
Footscray		Yes—step free access	1859	Ground level	10 connections: Ararat line; Ballarat line; Bendigo line; Echuca line; Geelong line; Maryborough line; Sunbury line; Swan Hill line; Warrnambool line; Williamstown line	Trams Buses
Seddon		No—steep ramp	1906	Ground level	1 connection: Williamstown line	
Yarraville		Yes—step free access	1871	Ground level	1 connection: Williamstown line	Buses
Spotswood		Yes—step free access	1878	Ground level	1 connection: Williamstown line	
Newport		No—steep ramp	1859	Ground level	1 connection: Williamstown line	Buses
Seaholme		No—steep ramp	1920	Ground level		Buses
Altona		Yes—step free access	1917	Ground level		Buses
Westona		Yes—step free access	1985	Ground level		Buses
Laverton		Yes—step free access	1886	Ground level		Buses
Aircraft		Yes—step free access	1925	Ground level		Buses
Williams Landing		Yes—step free access	2013	Ground level		Buses
Hoppers Crossing		Yes—step free access	1970	Ground level		Buses
Werribee		No—steep ramp	1857	Ground level		Buses

Station histories
Station	Opened	Closed	Age	Notes
Flagstaff	27 May 1985		41 years	Not a stop since 2021
Melbourne Central	26 January 1981		45 years	Formerly Museum; Not a stop since 2021
Parliament	22 January 1983		43 years	Not a stop since 2021
Flinders Street	12 September 1854		172 years	Formerly Melbourne Terminus
Southern Cross	17 January 1859		167 years	Formerly Batman's Hill; Formerly Spencer Street
North Melbourne	6 October 1859		167 years	
South Kensington	11 March 1891		135 years	
Saltwater River	1 October 1859	c. 1867	Approx. 8 years	
Footscray	24 September 1900		126 years	
Footscray (Suburban)	24 January 1859	24 September 1900	41 years	
Seddon	10 December 1906		119 years	
Yarraville	20 November 1871		154 years	
Spotswood	1 February 1878		148 years	Formerly Edom; Formerly Bayswater; Formerly Spottiswoode
Newport	1 March 1859		167 years	Formerly Geelong Junction; Formerly Williamstown Junction
Greenwich	25 June 1857	28 July 1857	33 days	
Garden Platform (Newport Workshops)	?	?		
Freezing Works Siding	27 April 1883	1993	110 years	
Williamstown Racecourse (1st)	26 December 1860	c. April 1885	Approx. 24 years	1st site
Metro Infrastructure Works Siding	2 June 1955		71 years	Formerly Vacuum Oil Siding; Formerly PRA Siding; Formerly Mobil Siding
SEC Siding	9 November 1952	14 September 1993	40 years	
Hatherley	2 March 1891	5 April 1897	6 years	
Mobiltown	24 November 1953	21 January 1985	31 years	Formerly Standard Oil Platform
Paisley	14 October 1929	14 April 1985	55 years	
Williamstown Racecourse (2nd)	6 April 1885	10 February 1940	54 years	2nd site
Australian Carbon Black Siding	1 December 1964	19 August 1990	25 years	
BP Sidings	c. 30 May 1922	July 1996	Approx. 74 years	Formerly Oil Refineries Sidings; Formerly COR Sidings
BP Platform	10 May 1927	October 1959	32 years	Formerly COR Platform
Seaholme	26 January 1920		106 years	
Altona	1 December 1917		108 years	Formerly Altona Beach (2nd)
Altona Beach (1st)	22 August 1888	14 August 1890	23 months	
Galvin	22 August 1927	14 April 1985	57 years	
Westona	25 January 1985		41 years	
Laverton	1 July 1886		140 years	
Aircraft	8 March 1926	May 1932	6 years	1st site; Was originally Aviation Siding; Later Aircraft Siding
Aircraft	10 May 1932		94 years	2nd site; Formerly Aircraft Siding
Williams Landing	28 April 2013		13 years	
Hoppers Crossing	16 November 1970	8 July 1983	12 years	1st site
Hoppers Crossing	9 July 1983		43 years	2nd site
Werribee	25 June 1857		169 years	
Werribee Racecourse	1884	March 1995	110 years	

== Infrastructure ==
=== Rolling stock ===
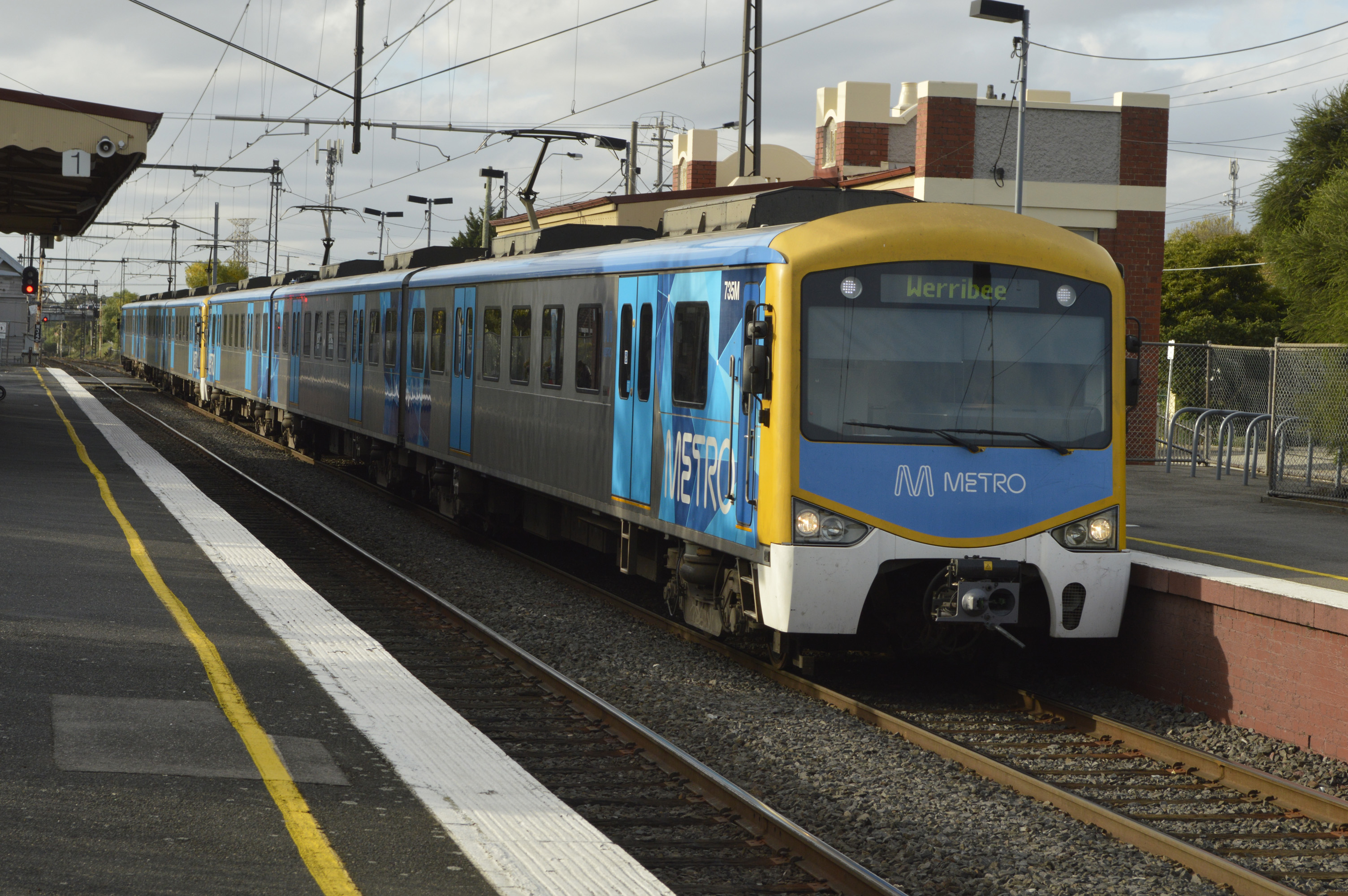
Siemens Nexas EMUs are one type of rolling stock featured on the line.

The Werribee line uses two different types of electric multiple unit (EMU) trains that are operated in a split six-car configuration, with three doors per side on each carriage. The primary rolling stock featured on the line is the Comeng EMUs, built by Commonwealth Engineering between 1981 and 1988. These train sets are the oldest on the Melbourne rail network and subsequently will be replaced by the mid 2030s. Siemens Nexas EMUs are also widely featured on the line, originally built between 2002 and 2005 these train sets feature more modern technology than the Comeng trains. The X'Trapolis 100 built by Alstom between 2002 and 2004, and 2009 and 2020 were also previously used on this line prior to the formation of the new Cross City Group in August 2026.

Alongside the passenger trains, Werribee line tracks and equipment are maintained by a fleet of engineering trains. The four types of engineering trains are: the shunting train; designed for moving trains along non-electrified corridors and for transporting other maintenance locomotives, for track evaluation; designed for evaluating track and its condition, the overhead inspection train; designed for overhead wiring inspection, and the infrastructure evaluation carriage designed for general infrastructure evaluation. Most of these trains are repurposed locomotives previously used by V/Line, Metro Trains, and the Southern Shorthaul Railroad.

=== Accessibility ===
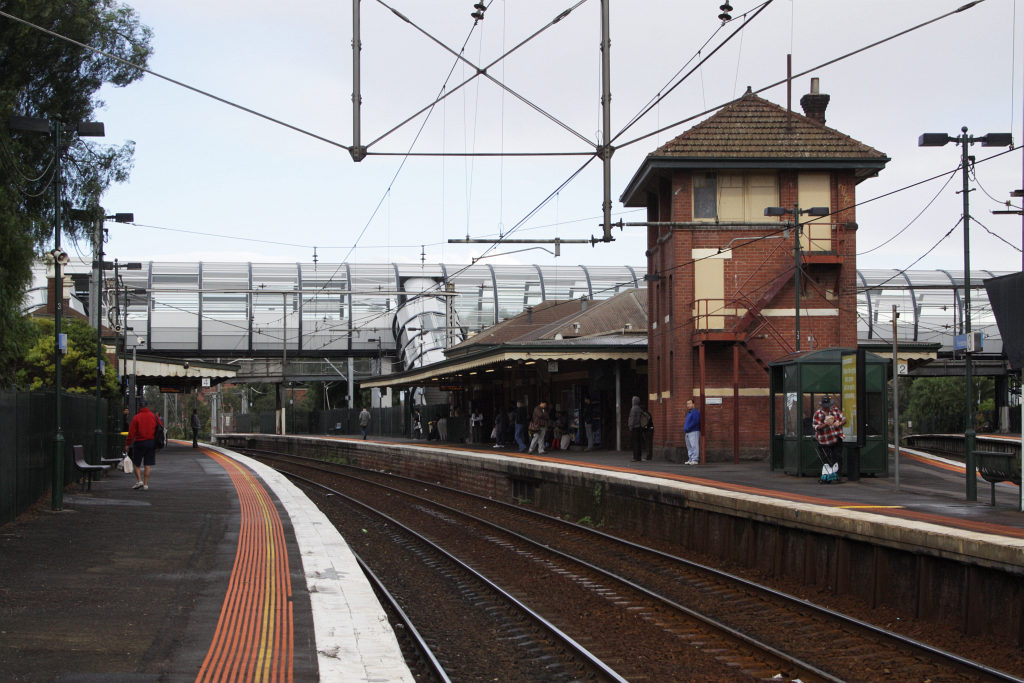
Footscray station is classed as fully wheelchair accessible due to the elevators provided in the foot bridge.

In compliance with the Disability Discrimination Act of 1992, all stations that are new-built or rebuilt are fully accessible and comply with these guidelines. The majority of stations on the corridor are fully accessible, however, there are some stations that haven't been upgraded to meet these guidelines. These stations do feature ramps, however, they have a gradient greater than 1 in 14. Stations that are fully accessible feature ramps that have a gradient less than 1 in 14, have at-grade paths, or feature lifts. These stations typically also feature tactile boarding indicators, independent boarding ramps, wheelchair accessible myki barriers, hearing loops, and widened paths.

Projects improving station accessibility have included the Level Crossing Removal Project, which involves station rebuilds and upgrades and other individual station upgrade projects. These works have made significant strides in improving network accessibility, with more than 76% of Werribee line stations classed as fully accessible. This number is expected to grow within the coming years with the completion of level crossing removal works on the corridor by 2029.

=== Signalling ===
The Werribee line uses three-position signalling which is widely used across the Melbourne train network. Three-position signalling was first introduced in 1927, with the final section of the line converted to the new type of signalling in 1946. Past Werribee, three-position signalling continues further past Geelong.
