= Newport railway station, Melbourne =

Railway station in Melbourne, Australia

Newport
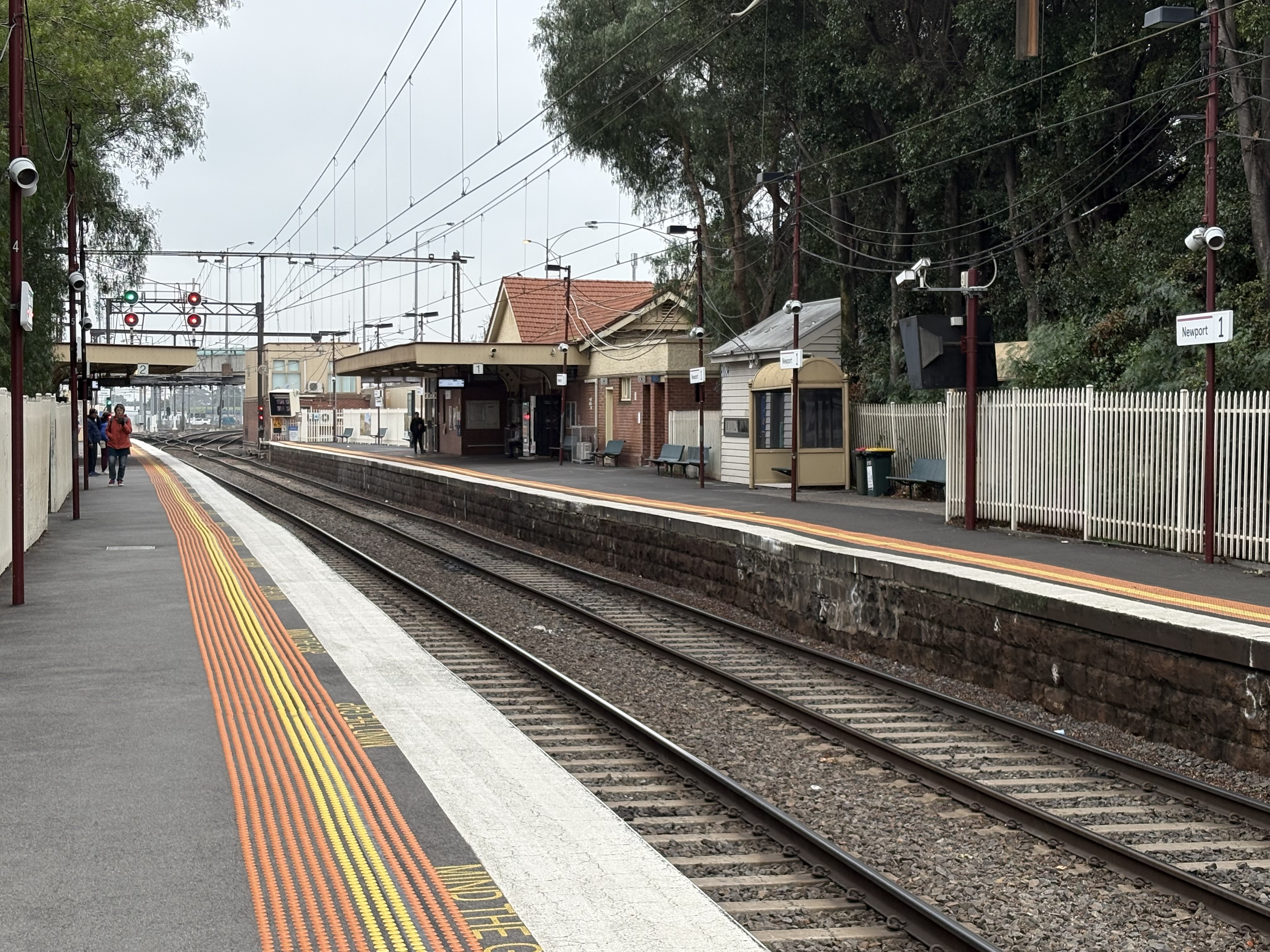
- Southbound view from Platform 2, July 2026

General information
- Location: Melbourne Road, Newport, Victoria 3015; City of Hobsons Bay; Australia
- Coordinates: 37°50′33″S 144°53′00″E
- System: PTV commuter rail station
- Owner: VicTrack
- Operator: Metro Trains
- Lines: Werribee; Williamstown
- Distance: 10.56 kilometres from Southern Cross
- Platforms: 2 side
- Tracks: 3
- Connections: Bus

Construction
- Structure type: Ground
- Parking: 80
- Cycle facilities: Yes
- Accessible: No—steep ramp

Other information
- Status: Operational, premium station
- Station code: NPT
- Fare zone: Myki zone 1
- Website: Public Transport Victoria

History
- Opened: 1 March 1859; 167 years ago
- Electrified: August 1920 (1500 V DC overhead)
- Former names: Geelong Junction (1859–1869); Williamstown Junction (1869–1881)

Passengers
- 2005–2006: 1,058,374
- 2006–2007: 1,154,389 ▲9.07%
- 2007–2008: 1,233,585 ▲6.86%
- 2008–2009: 1,258,748 ▲2.03%
- 2009–2010: 1,413,384 ▲12.28%
- 2010–2011: 1,312,301 ▼7.15%
- 2011–2012: 1,314,510 ▲0.16%
- 2012–2013: Not measured
- 2013–2014: 1,162,205 ▼11.58%
- 2014–2015: 1,143,968 ▼1.56%
- 2015–2016: 1,136,891 ▼0.61%
- 2016–2017: 1,294,074 ▲13.82%
- 2017–2018: 1,286,688 ▼0.57%
- 2018–2019: 1,334,350 ▲3.7%
- 2019–2020: 1,037,400 ▼22.25%
- 2020–2021: 497,600 ▼52.03%
- 2021–2022: 721,500 ▲44.99%

Services
Preceding station	Metro Trains	Following station
Spotswood towards Sandringham via Flinders Street	Williamstown line	North Williamstown towards Williamstown
Spotswood towards Sandringham via Flinders Street	Werribee line	Seaholme towards Laverton or Werribee via Altona
Footscray towards Sandringham via Flinders Street	Werribee line Weekdays	Laverton towards Werribee
Former services
Preceding station	V/Line	Following station
Footscray towards Southern Cross	Geelong line	Werribee towards Waurn Ponds
Footscray towards Southern Cross	Warrnambool line	Werribee towards Warrnambool
Preceding station	MetRail	Following station
Spotswood towards Flinders Street	Altona line	Mobiltown towards Altona
Spotswood towards Flinders Street	Werribee line	Paisley towards Werribee
Track layout
Location

Newport station is a railway station operated by Metro Trains Melbourne on the Werribee and Williamstown lines, both part of the Melbourne rail network. It serves the western suburb of Newport, in Melbourne, Victoria, Australia. Newport station is a ground level premium station, featuring two side platforms. It opened on 1 March 1859.

Initially opened as Geelong Junction, the station was renamed two times. It was renamed to Williamstown Junction in January 1869, then was given its current name of Newport on 1 November 1881.

Two sidings exist at the northern (up) end of the station, used for the stabling of trains that operate the Williamstown line shuttle services. The Western standard gauge line to Adelaide runs to the west of the station, behind Platform 1, and the Newport Railway Workshops are located to the south.

== History ==
In 1857, two years before the station opened, the Geelong and Melbourne Railway Company had opened its railway line from Geelong to Newport but, because the line from Melbourne to Newport was not yet complete, a track was constructed along North Road to a temporary terminus on the bank of the Yarra River at Greenwich, from where passengers were conveyed to Melbourne by ferry. In October of that year, the line from Melbourne to Williamstown, via Newport, was opened, and the Geelong line was connected to it.

In 1887, a line from Sunshine to Newport was opened, to allow easier access to the port of Williamstown for trains from the north of Victoria. A number of sidings were also provided in the Newport area: to a flour mill on the Melbourne side, and a goods yard on the western side of the Williamstown line.

In October 1960, the Melbourne Road level crossing, which was just south of the station, was grade separated and replaced with the current road overpass. In 1966, the stabling sidings to the north of the station were provided. On 22 July 1967, a freight line was constructed to the west of Platform 1, so that freight services could bypass the station itself. In 1995, that line was converted to dual gauge, and became part of the Western standard gauge line to Adelaide.

On 18 July 1996, Newport was upgraded to a premium station.

There have been several calls to build a Melbourne Metro 2 line, once the Melbourne Metro Rail Tunnel has been completed. Melbourne Metro 2 would run from Newport to Clifton Hill via Southern Cross. The project, designed to serve the Fishermans Bend development, as well as add capacity to the Mernda and Werribee lines, would bring considerable change to Newport, perhaps adding underground platforms. There have also been suggestions to route Geelong line services via Newport into Southern Cross once again, given the crowding at Wyndham Vale and Tarneit, as well as the lack of capacity on the Regional Rail Link set of tracks between Sunshine and the city.

Announced as part of a $57.7 million package in the 2022/23 Victorian State Budget, Newport, along with other stations, will receive DDA-compliant accessibility upgrades. The work was to begin in late 2022, with a timeline for the project to be released once construction began.

On the Altona loop line, Mobiltown station, now closed and demolished, was located between Newport and Seaholme. On the direct route to Werribee, Paisley station now closed, and Galvin station, closed and demolished, were situated between Newport and Laverton.

== Platforms and services ==
Newport has two side platforms. Platform 1 features a large brick building which houses an enclosed waiting area and toilets. Platform 2 has a smaller brick building which also contains toilets.

It is served by Werribee and Williamstown line trains.

Newport platform arrangement
Platform	Line	Destination	Via	Service Type	Notes	Source
1	Werribee line Williamstown line	Flinders Street or Sandringham		All stations and limited express services.		
2	Werribee line	Laverton or Werribee	Altona	All stations and limited express services.	Services to Laverton only operate on weekdays before 7pm.	
2	Williamstown line	Williamstown		All stations		

== Transport links ==
Transit Systems Victoria operates four bus routes via Newport station, under contract to Public Transport Victoria:

- 432 : to Yarraville station
- 471 : Williamstown – Sunshine station
- 472 : Williamstown – Moonee Ponds Junction
- Night Bus 947 : to Footscray station (Saturday and Sunday mornings only)
