= Altona railway station =

Railway station in Altona, Melbourne, Victoria, Australia

Altona
- Eastbound view from the single platform, September 2026

General information
- Location: Railway Street South, Altona, Victoria 3018; City of Hobsons Bay; Australia
- Coordinates: 37°52′02″S 144°49′48″E
- System: PTV commuter rail station
- Owner: VicTrack
- Operator: Metro Trains
- Line: Werribee
- Distance: 17.15 kilometres from Southern Cross
- Platforms: 1
- Tracks: 1
- Connections: Bus

Construction
- Structure type: Ground
- Parking: 70
- Cycle facilities: Yes
- Accessible: Yes—step free access

Other information
- Status: Operational, unstaffed
- Station code: ALT
- Fare zone: Myki zone 1/2
- Website: Public Transport Victoria

History
- Opened: 1 December 1917; 108 years ago
- Electrified: 2 October 1926 (1500 V DC overhead)
- Former names: Altona Beach (1917-1938)

Passengers
- 2005–2006: 325,384
- 2006–2007: 337,402 ▲3.69%
- 2007–2008: 363,468 ▲7.72%
- 2008–2009: 409,006 ▲12.52%
- 2009–2010: 391,029 ▼4.39%
- 2010–2011: 385,586 ▼1.39%
- 2011–2012: 281,536 ▼26.98%
- 2012–2013: Not measured
- 2013–2014: 308,479 ▲9.57%
- 2014–2015: 298,864 ▼3.11%
- 2015–2016: 303,484 ▲1.54%
- 2016–2017: 311,955 ▲2.79%
- 2017–2018: 315,295 ▲1.07%
- 2018–2019: 302,850 ▼3.94%
- 2019–2020: 261,900 ▼13.52%
- 2020–2021: 126,100 ▼51.85%
- 2021–2022: 144,800 ▲14.83%
- 2022–2023: 226,200 ▲56.22%
- 2023–2024: 260,350 ▲15.1%
- 2024–2025: 263,300 ▲1.13%

Services
| Preceding station | Metro Trains | Following station |
|---|---|---|
| Seaholme towards Sandringham via Flinders Street | Werribee line Weekdays | Westona towards Laverton |
| Seaholme towards Sandringham via Flinders Street | Werribee line Weekends | Westona towards Werribee |
Track layout
Location

Altona station is a railway station operated by Metro Trains Melbourne on the Werribee line, part of the Melbourne railway network. It serves the south-western suburb of the same name, in Melbourne, Victoria, Australia. Altona station is a ground level unstaffed station, featuring one side platform. It opened on 1 December 1917.

Initially opened as Altona Beach, the station was given its current name of Altona on 3 October 1938.

== History ==
Altona station was originally opened as the terminus of the line from Newport. In 1888, the Altona Bay Estate Company, a private land developer, constructed a railway to Altona. The first official trains ran on the line on 8 September of that year. On 9 November 1888, the line was extended to a station named "Altona Beach", which was about a kilometre to the west of the current station.

As a result of the collapse of the 1880s Land Boom, regular services to Altona Beach ceased after August 1890, and the Victorian Government declined the offer of the owners to gift it the line. In the 1890s, a company opened a brown coal mine near the terminus of the line and, in 1907, a siding was built in the same area to enable sand to be dispatched by rail. In 1910, the Altona Brown Coal Colliery Company began railing quantities of brown coal, using a short north-west extension of the Altona line.

In 1917, the owners of the railway entered into an agreement with the Victorian Railways (VR) to provide a regular passenger service, having guaranteed to cover any operating losses. On 1 December 1917, the VR opened a new "Altona Beach" station at the present site. For a period of time, de-motored McKeen railmotors were used as carriages on steam-hauled passenger services.

By 1924, the private owner of the Altona line owed the VR £7,289, being the accumulated deficit on operating passenger services, so the VR took full control of the line on 1 October of that year. In 1926, the track was electrified and, in 1938, the station was renamed "Altona". Apart from a few direct trains between Altona and Melbourne in peak periods, all trains were run as shuttle services between Newport and Altona.

On 31 July 1959, the station was closed to goods traffic and, in 1967, flashing light signals were provided at the Pier Street level crossing, at the up end of the station. In 1977, the platform was extended at the down end.

By the early 1980s, the station, and the line itself, was under threat of closure, as recommended in the Lonie Report. In October 1981, the rail service was drastically cut, with all shuttle services withdrawn, and only two morning and evening trains being operated to and from Melbourne. However, a change of state government in 1982 saw the restitution of most services in July of that year.

On 21 January 1985, the line was extended to Westona and, on 14 April of that year, it was further extended, from Westona to Laverton. Also in that year, boom barriers were provided at the Pier Street level crossing.

== Platforms and services ==
Altona has one platform and is served by Werribee line trains.

Altona platform arrangement
| Platform | Line | Destination | Via | Service Type | Notes | Source |
|---|---|---|---|---|---|---|
| 1 | Werribee line | Sandringham or Laverton | Newport and Flinders Street or Westona | All stations services | Weekdays: Services to Laverton serve the Altona Loop. | |
| 1 | Werribee line | Sandringham or Werribee | Newport and Flinders Street or Westona | All stations services | After 7pm & Weekends: All services to and from Werribee run via the Altona Loop. | |

== Transport links ==
CDC Melbourne operates three bus routes via Altona station, under contract to Public Transport Victoria:

- 411 : Laverton station – Footscray
- 412 : Laverton station – Footscray
- 415 : Laverton station – Williamstown

Kinetic Melbourne operates one SmartBus route to and from Altona station, under contract to Public Transport Victoria:

- SmartBus 903 : to Mordialloc
