= Laverton railway station, Melbourne =

Railway station in Laverton, Melbourne, Victoria, Australia

Laverton
- South-west bound view from Platform 1, September 2026

General information
- Location: Railway Avenue, Laverton, Victoria 3027; City of Hobsons Bay; Australia
- Coordinates: 37°51′50″S 144°46′20″E
- System: PTV commuter rail station
- Owner: VicTrack
- Operator: Metro Trains
- Line: Werribee
- Distance: 21.01 kilometres from Southern Cross
- Platforms: 3 (1 island, 1 side)
- Tracks: 4
- Connections: Bus

Construction
- Structure type: Ground
- Parking: 947
- Cycle facilities: Yes—19 spaces
- Accessible: Yes—step free access

Other information
- Status: Operational, premium station
- Station code: LAV
- Fare zone: Myki zone 1/2
- Website: Public Transport Victoria

History
- Opened: 1 July 1886; 140 years ago
- Rebuilt: 2009-2010
- Electrified: November 1983 (1500 V DC overhead)

Passengers
- 2005–2006: 736,023
- 2006–2007: 842,093 ▲14.41%
- 2007–2008: 1,091,564 ▲29.62%
- 2008–2009: 1,442,894 ▲32.18%
- 2009–2010: 1,527,169 ▲5.84%
- 2010–2011: 1,666,838 ▲9.14%
- 2011–2012: 1,715,939 ▲2.94%
- 2012–2013: Not measured
- 2013–2014: 1,501,737 ▼12.48%
- 2014–2015: 1,269,140 ▼15.48%
- 2015–2016: 1,127,856 ▼11.13%
- 2016–2017: 1,140,726 ▲1.14%
- 2017–2018: 1,152,390 ▲1.02%
- 2018–2019: 1,196,550 ▲3.83%
- 2019–2020: 944,750 ▼21.04%
- 2020–2021: 596,350 ▼36.87%
- 2021–2022: 552,750 ▼7.31%

Services
Preceding station	Metro Trains	Following station
Westona towards Sandringham via Flinders Street	Werribee line	Terminus
Westona towards Sandringham via Flinders Street	Werribee line	Aircraft towards Werribee
Newport towards Flinders Street	Werribee line Weekday express services	Aircraft towards Werribee
Former services
Preceding station	MetRail	Following station
Galvin towards Flinders Street	Werribee line	Aircraft towards Werribee
Track layout
Location

Laverton is a railway station on the Werribee line, part of the Melbourne railway network, and serves the south-western suburb of the same name in Melbourne, Victoria, Australia. Laverton is a ground-level premium station, with three platforms, one island platform and one side platform. It was opened on 1 July 1886, with the current platform 1 provided in 2010.

At the up end of the station, the tracks diverge. Werribee-bound services take the direct double track route to Newport, while all-stations Altona services operate on the single track Altona loop line to Newport. The loop line reconnects with the direct route just north of the former Paisley railway station.

The Western standard gauge line passes to the north of Platform 1.

== History ==
Laverton station was named after the pastoral run Laverton, which was settled by Alfred Langhorne in 1836. Land speculator, C.R. Staples, managed to persuade the Victorian Railways commissioners to construct a station to assist the sale of land in the "Township of Laverton" he was promoting. The end of the 1880s Land Boom, and the subsequent economic depression, meant that there was almost no development there for the next eighty years.

In 1968, the former side platform was converted to an island platform, when the line was to Werribee was duplicated. In 1969, the station building on the island platform (now platforms 2 and 3) was provided.

At about 7:55pm on 10 July 1976, a derailment occurred at the up end of the station, involving a Port Fairy – Melbourne passenger service. After crossing from the east line to the west line, the train derailed and sideswiped the Princes Highway overpass, destroying a number of wood-bodied carriages. There was one fatality, and a number of other passengers were injured. It was later revealed that the train had diverged through a crossover at excessive speed.

In 1986, the control of all signals and points was transferred to the Newport signal box, although the signal control panel remained within the station building until 2009.

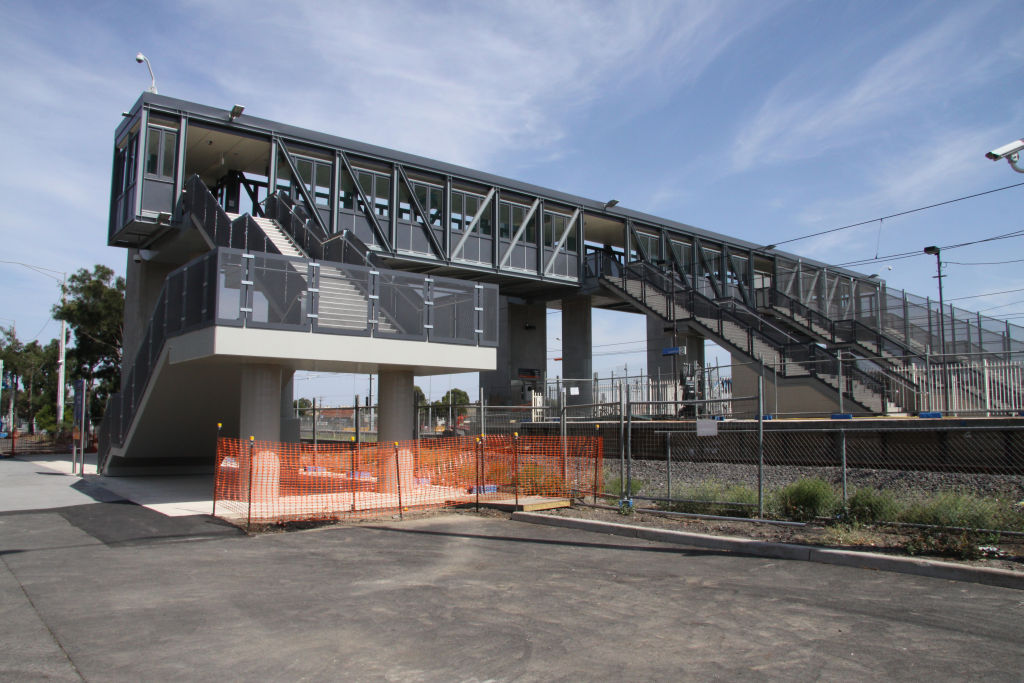
The station footbridge, built as part of the 2009-2010 station upgrade, February 2010

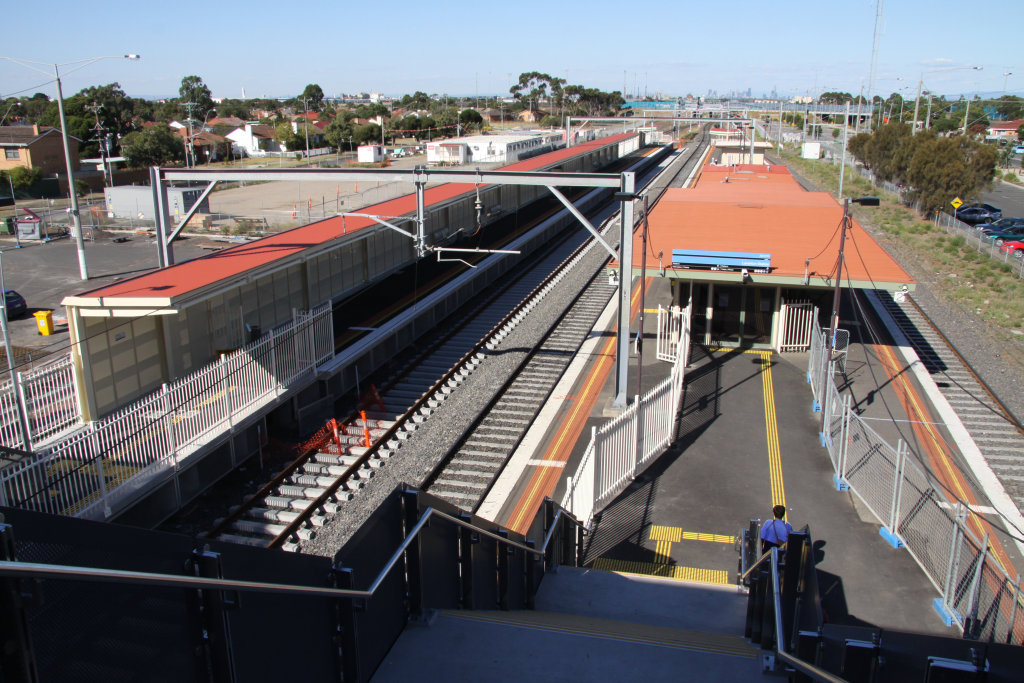
The renewed station platforms taken from the footbridge, February 2010

On 1 October 1987, two Hitachi suburban trains collided at the up end of the station, near Laverton Junction, after an up train over ran the Altona loop line and collided with a down train.

In 1998, Laverton was upgraded to a premium station.

In 2009–10, Laverton received a $92.6 million upgrade, including the building of a third platform and the tripling of one kilometre of existing double track, between the Altona loop line and the station. In October 2009, the first section of the footbridge was installed and, on 9 February 2010, the completed bridge was opened to the public. The remainder of these works were completed in mid-2010.

Until June 2015, Geelong and Warrnambool line services passed through the station, but those services now use the Regional Rail Link route via Sunshine, Tarneit and Wyndham Vale.

As part of Stage One of the Western Rail Plan Geelong Fast Rail project, Laverton was to be upgraded. However, the Geelong Fast Rail project was abandoned in 2023.

Between Laverton and Newport stations, the former Galvin station has been closed and removed, and the former Paisley station has been closed, with platform access and the station building removed, although the platform itself remains.

== Platforms and services ==
Laverton has one island platform one side platform, linked by an overhead footbridge. It is served by Werribee line trains.

Laverton platform arrangement
Platform	Line	Destination	Via	Service Type	Notes	Source
1	Werribee line	Flinders Street		Limited express services	Weekdays only.	
1	Werribee line	Sandringham	Altona and Flinders Street	All stations		
2	Werribee line	Werribee		All stations	Weekdays only, 5am-7pm.	
3	Werribee line	Sandringham	Altona and Flinders Street	All stations	Weekdays only, 5am-7pm.	
3	Werribee line	Werribee		All stations	Weekdays after 7pm and weekends.	

== Transport links ==
CDC Melbourne operates nine bus routes to and from Laverton station, under contract to Transport Victoria:

- 154 : to Tarneit station
- 400 : to Sunshine station (shared with Transit Systems Victoria)
- 411 : to Footscray
- 412 : to Footscray
- 414 : to Footscray
- 415 : to Williamstown
- 417 : to Laverton North
- 496 : to Sanctuary Lakes (Point Cook)
- 498 : to Hoppers Crossing station

Transit Systems Victoria operates one bus route to and from Laverton station, under contract to Transport Victoria:

- 400 : to Sunshine station (shared with CDC Melbourne)
