= Werribee railway station =

Railway station in Melbourne, Australia

Werribee
- South-west bound view from Platform 2, September 2026

General information
- Location: Comben Drive, Werribee, Victoria 3030; City of Wyndham; Australia
- Coordinates: 37°53′58″S 144°39′40″E
- System: PTV commuter rail station
- Owner: VicTrack
- Operator: Metro Trains
- Line: Werribee
- Distance: 31.70 kilometres from Southern Cross
- Platforms: 3 (1 island, 1 side)
- Tracks: 3
- Connections: Bus

Construction
- Structure type: Ground
- Parking: 582
- Cycle facilities: Yes
- Accessible: No—steep ramp

Other information
- Status: Operational, premium station
- Station code: WER
- Fare zone: Myki zone 2
- Website: Public Transport Victoria

History
- Opened: 25 June 1857; 169 years ago
- Rebuilt: 30 April 1983
- Electrified: November 1983 (1500 V DC overhead)

Passengers
- 2005–2006: 709,932
- 2006–2007: 783,089 ▲10.3%
- 2007–2008: 893,854 ▲14.14%
- 2008–2009: 907,355 ▲1.51%
- 2009–2010: 963,761 ▲6.21%
- 2010–2011: 1,039,778 ▲7.88%
- 2011–2012: 1,067,810 ▲2.69%
- 2012–2013: Not measured
- 2013–2014: 1,364,480 ▲27.78%
- 2014–2015: 1,380,879 ▲1.2%
- 2015–2016: 1,109,420 ▼19.65%
- 2016–2017: 1,103,799 ▼0.5%
- 2017–2018: 1,128,344 ▲2.22%
- 2018–2019: 1,211,200 ▲7.34%
- 2019–2020: 1,061,600 ▼12.35%
- 2020–2021: 351,350 ▼66.9%
- 2021–2022: 532,750 ▲51.62%

Services
Preceding station	Metro Trains	Following station
Hoppers Crossing towards Sandringham via Flinders Street	Werribee line	Terminus
Former services
Preceding station	V/Line	Following station
Newport towards Southern Cross	Geelong line	Little River towards Waurn Ponds or Warrnambool
Newport towards Spencer Street	Geelong line	Werribee Racecourse towards South Geelong
Track layout
Location

Werribee is a railway station operated by Metro Trains Melbourne and the terminus of the Werribee line, part of the Melbourne rail network. It serves the western suburb of Werribee, in Melbourne, Victoria, Australia. Werribee station is a ground level premium station, featuring three platforms, an island platform with two faces and one side platform. It opened on 25 June 1857, with the current station provided in 1983.

The Western standard gauge line, which operates between Melbourne and Adelaide, passes to the north of Platform 1.

== History ==
Werribee station opened on 25 June 1857 by the Geelong and Melbourne Railway Company, as part of the railway line between those two cities. It was designed by Frederick Kawerau, in partnership with Edward Snell, the engineer for the Geelong and Melbourne Railway Company. In May 1927, the station building was heavily damaged by fire. As part of the rebuilding, a new, low-pitched roof was provided, and the surviving bluestone walls were cement rendered. A stone plaque, embossed with "G.&M.R. 1857", was once located on the south gable, but was lost after the fire. It has since been found, and was built into the wall of the former Victorian Railways printing works in Laurens Street, North Melbourne, before being relocated to Arden Station in 2024 as part of the Metro Tunnel project.

In 1963, boom barriers replaced hand gates at the former Cherry Street level crossing, which was located at the up end of the station. In 1968, the line between Werribee and Laverton was duplicated, with duplication to Little River occurring in 1970.

In 1973, all interlocking at the station was abolished, with a signal panel provided. In 1976, boom barriers replaced hand gates at the former Werribee Street level crossing, which was located nearby in the down direction of the station. On 11 October 1979, a Seymour-Geelong goods train derailed at the station, causing extensive damage to both platforms and the station building on Platform 2 (now Platform 3).

In April 1983, the current island platform and underpass was provided. In November of that year, the line from Newport to Werribee was electrified. In 1987, sidings "B", "E" and "F" were abolished.

In 1997, Werribee was upgraded to a premium station.

Under the Level Crossing Removal Project, the Cherry Street level crossing was grade separated, with a road overpass built approximately 1 km (0.62 mi) east of the station, connecting Tarneit Road with the Princes Highway. Construction began in February 2020 and, on 11 March 2021, the overpass was opened to traffic. The Cherry Street level crossing was closed to traffic on the same day, and was replaced with a pedestrian and cyclist underpass, which opened on 1 April of that year.

As part of stage 1 of the Western Rail Plan's Geelong Fast Rail project, Werribee is scheduled to be upgraded. Construction was set to begin in 2023 but as of March 2026, no progress has been made on the project.

== Platforms and services ==
Werribee has one side platform and one island platform with two faces. It is serviced by Metro Trains' Werribee line services.

Werribee platform arrangement
Platform	Line	Destination	Via	Service Type	Notes	Source
1	Werribee line	Sandringham	Flinders Street	All stations		
1	Werribee line	Flinders Street or Sandringham	Flinders Street	Limited express services	Weekdays only	
2	Werribee line	Sandringham	Flinders Street	All stations		
2	Werribee line	Flinders Street or Sandringham	Flinders Street	Limited express services	Weekdays only	
3	Only used during delays.					

Train services mostly alternate departing platforms 1 & 2 with platform 3 seeing only a very limited weekday service.

Until June 2015, V/Line Geelong and Warrnambool line services operated via Werribee, with many of the services stopping at the station. The Melbourne-bound services used Platform 2, while Geelong-bound services used Platform 3. These services now operate via the Regional Rail Link.

== Transport links ==
CDC Melbourne operates thirteen bus routes to and from Werribee station, under contract to Public Transport Victoria:

- 153 : to Williams Landing station
- 161 : to Hoppers Crossing station
- 170 : to Tarneit station
- 180 : to Tarneit station
- 181 : to Hoppers Crossing station
- 182 : to Tarneit station
- 190 : to Wyndham Vale station
- 191 : to Jubilee Estate (Wyndham Vale)
- 192 : to Wyndham Vale station
- 194 : to Wyndham Vale station via Ison Road
- 439 : to Werribee South
- 441 : to Riverwalk Estate (Werribee)
- 443 : to Werribee station (loop service via South Werribee)
