= Sandringham railway station =

Railway station in Melbourne, Australia

Sandringham
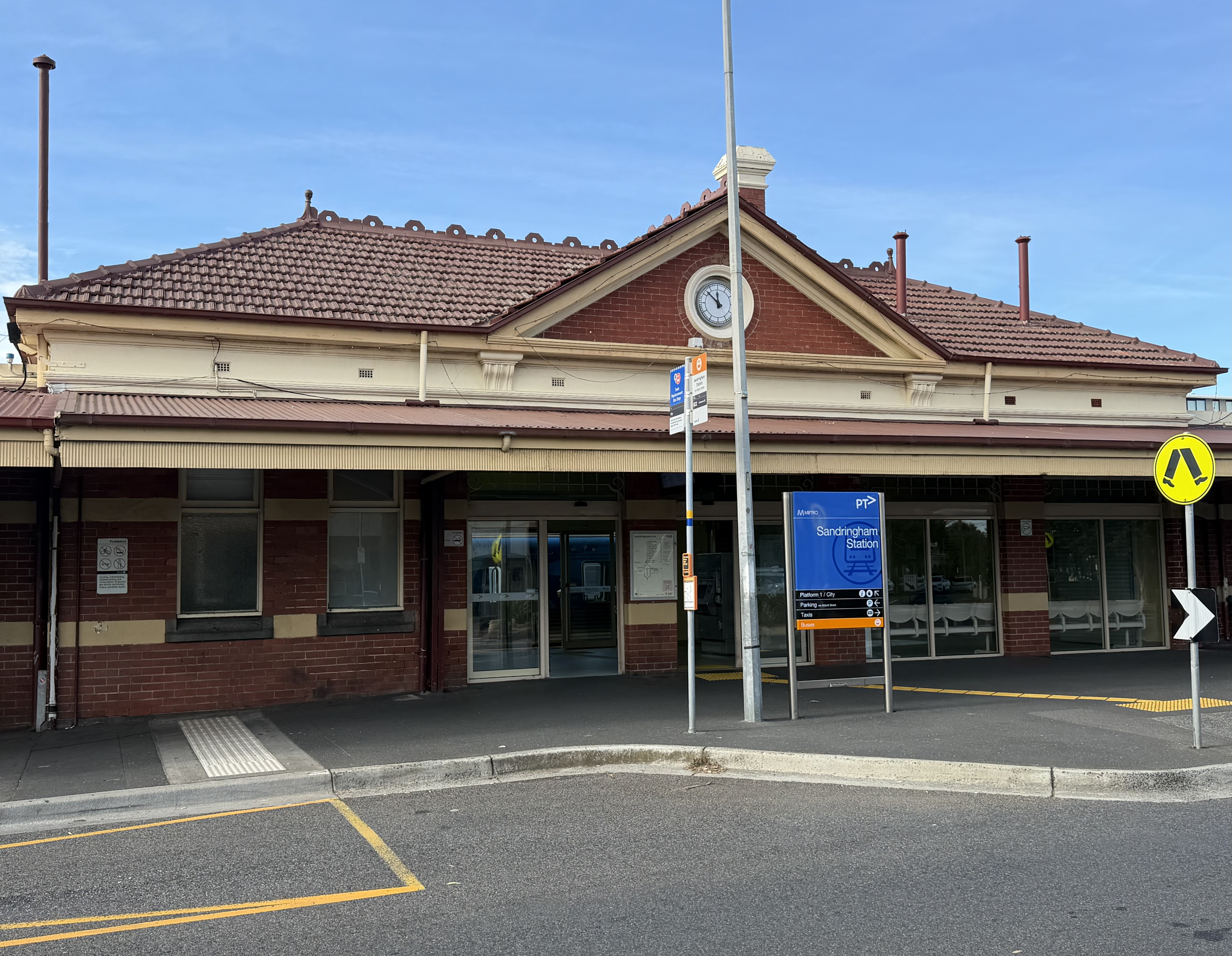
- Station building and entrance, May 2026

General information
- Location: Station Street, Sandringham, Victoria 3191; City of Bayside; Australia
- Coordinates: 37°57′01″S 145°00′16″E
- System: PTV commuter rail station
- Owner: VicTrack
- Operator: Metro Trains
- Line: Sandringham
- Distance: 19.16 kilometres from Southern Cross
- Platforms: 1
- Tracks: 4
- Connections: Bus

Construction
- Structure type: Ground
- Parking: 139
- Cycle facilities: 20
- Accessible: Yes—step free access

Other information
- Status: Operational, premium station
- Station code: SHM
- Fare zone: Myki zone 2
- Website: Public Transport Victoria

History
- Opened: 2 September 1887; 139 years ago
- Electrified: May 1919 (1500 V DC overhead)

Passengers
- 2005–2006: 467,871
- 2006–2007: 519,695 ▲11.07%
- 2007–2008: 558,439 ▲7.45%
- 2008–2009: 606,219 ▲8.55%
- 2009–2010: 628,113 ▲3.61%
- 2010–2011: 637,832 ▲1.54%
- 2011–2012: 628,605 ▼1.44%
- 2012–2013: Not measured
- 2013–2014: 684,135 ▲8.83%
- 2014–2015: 711,458 ▲3.99%
- 2015–2016: 940,831 ▲32.24%
- 2016–2017: 940,819 ▼0.001%
- 2017–2018: 904,339 ▼3.87%
- 2018–2019: 875,538 ▼3.18%
- 2019–2020: 813,600 ▼7.07%
- 2020–2021: 350,400 ▼56.93%
- 2021–2022: 423,250 ▲20.79%

Services
Preceding station	Metro Trains	Following station
Hampton towards Laverton, Werribee or Williamstown via Flinders Street	Sandringham line	Terminus
Track layout
Location

Sandringham station is a railway station operated by Metro Trains Melbourne and the terminus of the Sandringham line, which is part of the Melbourne rail network. It serves the south-eastern suburb of Sandringham, in Melbourne, Victoria, Australia. Sandringham station is a ground level premium station, featuring a single platform. It opened on 2 September 1887.

A signal box is located at the up (Flinders Street) end of the station and a stabling yard is located directly opposite to the station, stabling up to four trains overnight. The signal box controls all home signals and junctions between Brighton Beach and Sandringham including manual operation of the Abbott Street level crossing, one of two remaining non tram-square level crossing to be controlled manually with the other being Macaulay Road, Kensington. Sandringham signal box is also the last signal box on the suburban network to feature a Lever frame.

== History ==
Sandringham station opened on 2 September 1887, when the railway line from Brighton Beach was extended. Like the suburb itself, the station was named after Sandringham House, which was inspired by landowner and parliamentarian Charles H. Jones who, between 1864–1871 and 1886–1889, was a member of the Victorian Legislative Assembly.

A tram service, operated by the Victorian Railways, operated from Sandringham to Black Rock from 1919 until 1956. In 1957, the station was closed to goods traffic.

On 28 May 1919, Melbournes first electric train service departed the station bound for Essendon via Flinders Street with speech by acting Prime Minister William Watt. Full electric service on the line began the next day. Due to "Trouble with the pony motor" at Middle Brighton, full six carriage electric trains could not run until 14 September 1919. Initially after electric services commenced, there were 21 services per weekday travelling from Sandringham to Flinders Street with an off-peak frequency of every 25 minutes.

In 1967, boom barriers replaced interlocked gates at the Abbott Street level crossing, located at the up end of the station. On 16 January 1968, a collision involving two Tait train sets occurred between Hampton and Sandringham.

On 17 June 1988, No. 5 road was abolished, leaving the platform road and three siding roads. On 30 October 1995, Sandringham was upgraded to a premium station.

On 30 August 2002, Comeng motor carriage 500M was destroyed by fire as it travelled between Hampton and Sandringham.

On 9 March 2011, a Siemens Nexas train overshot one of the sidings and crashed into a branch of the Bendigo Bank.

== Platforms and services ==
Sandringham has one platform. It is serviced by Metro Trains' Sandringham line services.

Sandringham platform arrangement
Platform	Line	Destination	Via	Service Type	Notes	Source
1	Sandringham line	Laverton, Werribee or Williamstown	Flinders Street	All stations	Services to Laverton and Williamstown only operate on weekdays.	

== Transport links ==
Kinetic Melbourne operates three bus routes via Sandringham station, under contract to Public Transport Victoria:

- 600 : Westfield Southland – St Kilda station
- 922 : Westfield Southland – St Kilda station
- 923 : Westfield Southland – St Kilda station

Ventura Bus Lines operates one route to and from Sandringham station, under contract to Public Transport Victoria:

- 822 : to Chadstone Shopping Centre

== Gallery ==
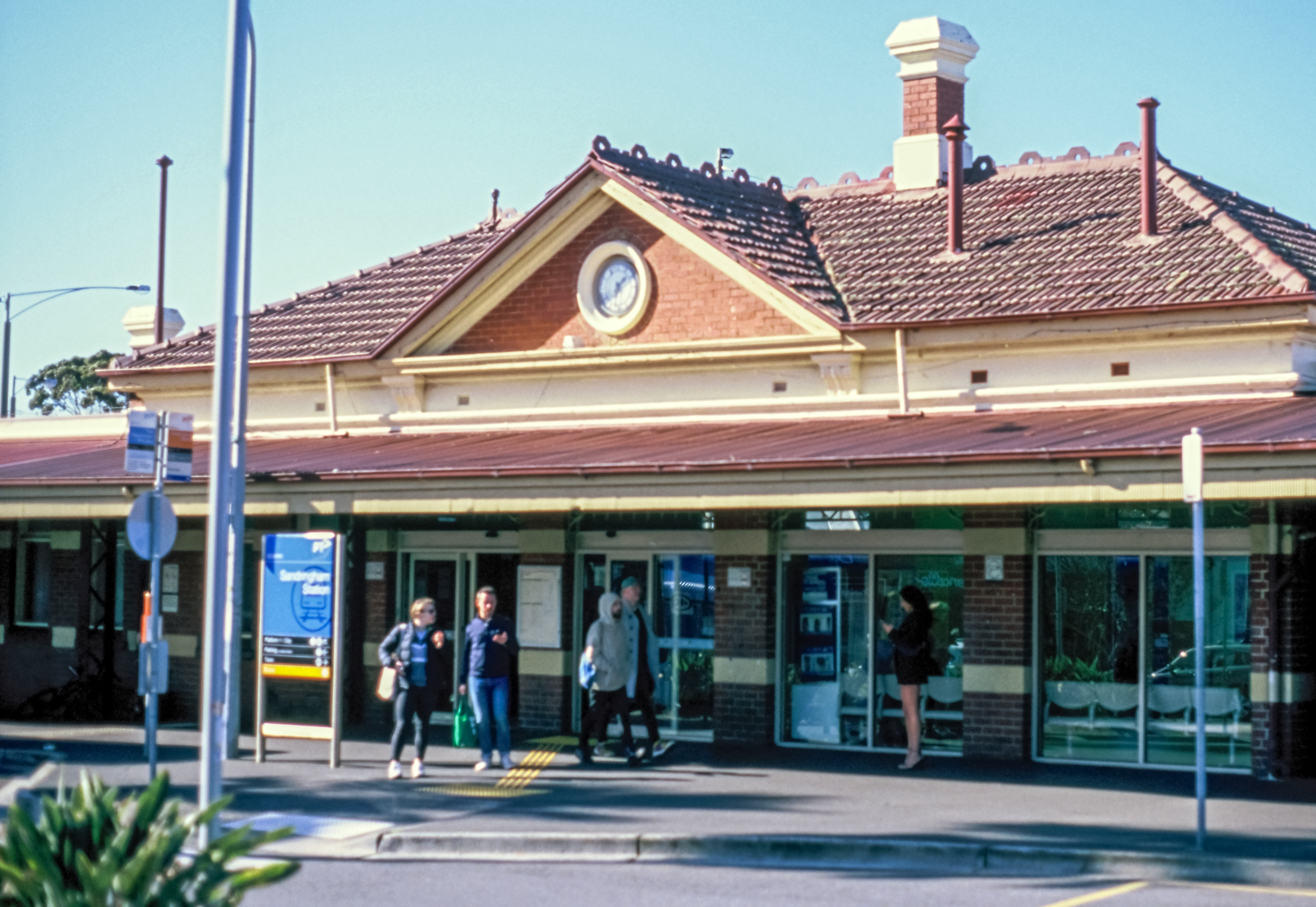
Station entrance in 2022

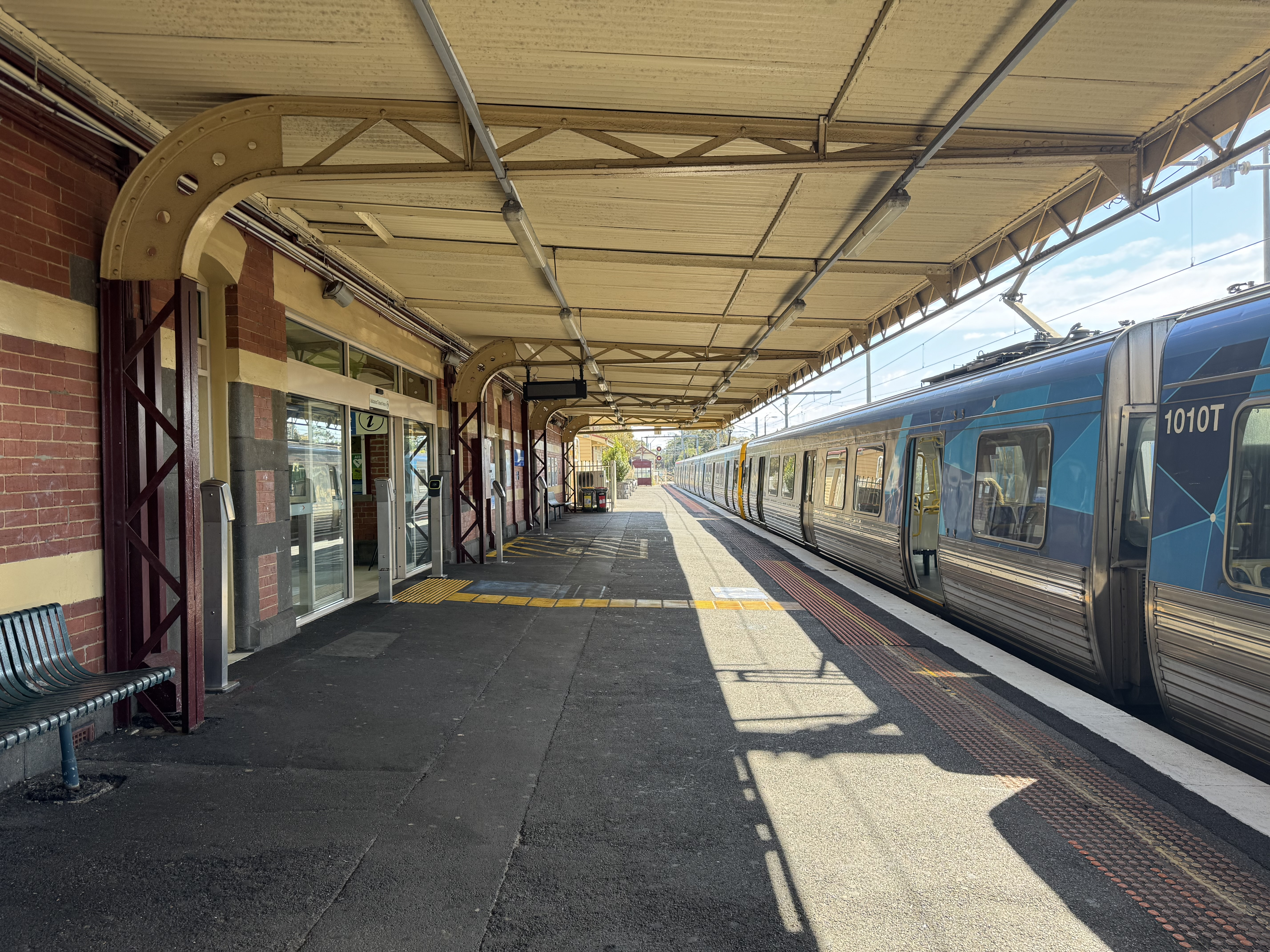
The station's platform with a Comeng train on that platform, October 2025

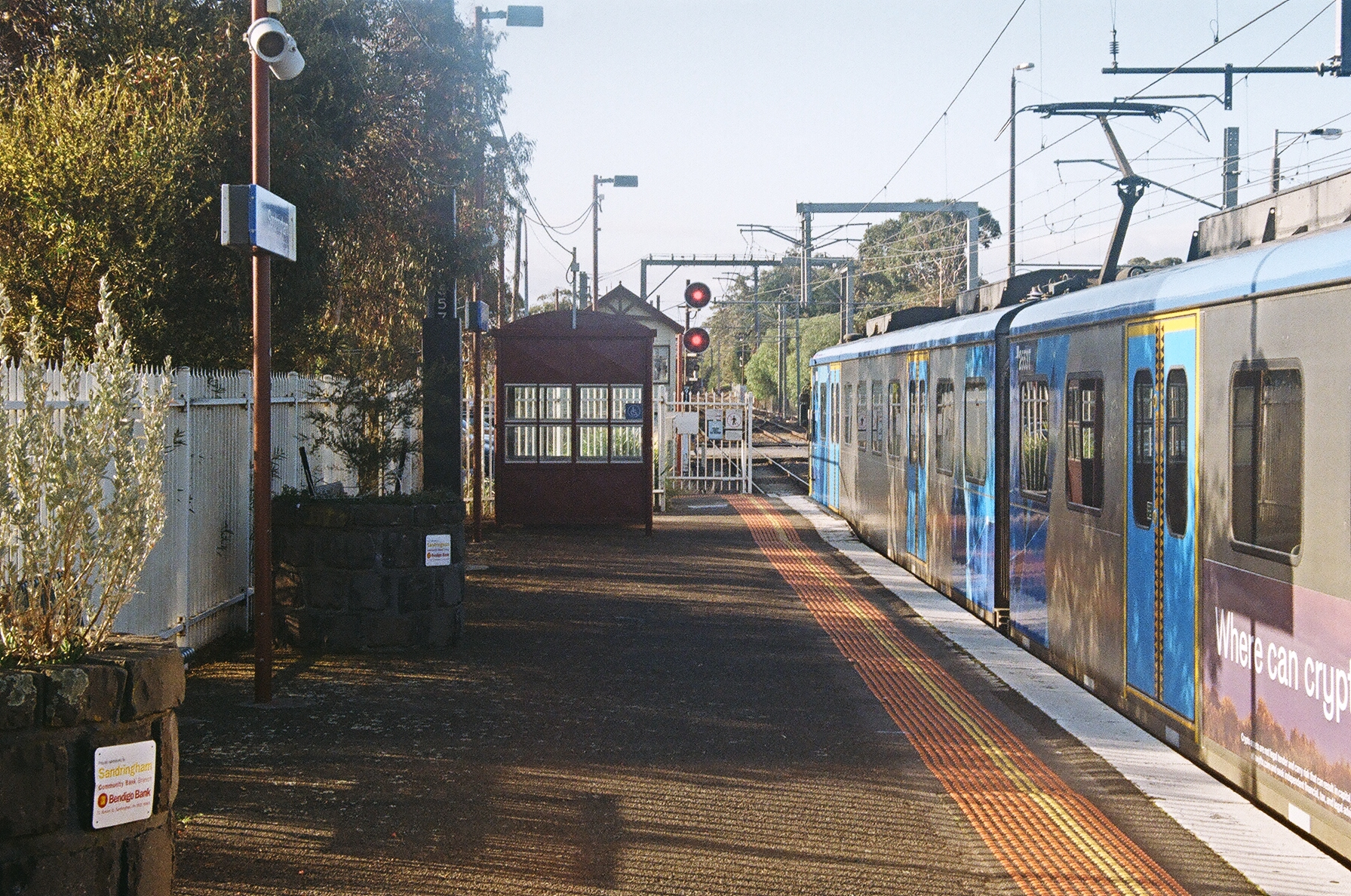
Platform 1 in August 2025
