= Truganina Coastal Parklands =

Parklands in Victoria, Australia

Coordinates: 37°52′43″S 144°48′18″E

The Truganina Coastal Parklands are located 15 km west of Melbourne CBD, on the shores of Port Phillip Bay, stretching from Altona to Altona Meadows and adjacent to the Cheetham Wetlands and the Point Cook Coastal Park. They were formed through the 'recycling' of more than 300 hectares of parks and former industrial land and are now the largest cluster of parks on Port Phillip Bay, interlinked by cycling and walking trails and featuring a surprisingly high diversity and abundance of landscapes, natural environment and recreational areas, including beachside recreation, picnic & barbecue facilities, grassfields and wildlife conservation areas. The wetlands form part of the Cheetham and Altona Important Bird Area.

== Constituent areas ==
The parklands comprise the following areas:

- Truganina Park
- Truganina Explosives Reserve
- Truganina Swamp
- Kooringal Golf Course
- Altona Treatment Plant
- Apex Park
- Doug Grant Reserve

The Laverton Creek which runs south into Port Phillip Bay separates Truganina Park and Altona Treatment Plant on the western side from the other areas on the eastern side. Truganina Park is linked to Explosives Reserve by the Laverton Creek Bridge – a wooden cycle and foot bridge.

== Truganina Park ==
Truganina Park is a 25-hectares recreational and conservation park, 'recycled ' from the former Altona Landfill Tip, which was closed in 1998. A key feature of the Park is the 100 Steps to Federation, a stone staircase made from Bluestone basalt rocks recycled from the Tip. The steps lead to the highest land point between Melbourne and the You Yangs mountain ranges, where you can take in sweeping panoramic views of Melbourne City, Port Phillip Bay and the adjoining Cheetham Wetlands. The 17-metres high mound is topped by a sculpture called the Time Beacon, created by the artist Cameron Robbins and looking out over Port Phillip Bay.

The Truganina Park is home to the endangered Altona skipper butterfly. A concrete drain, which takes stormwater from the adjacent residential Altona Meadows and runs through the Park, is restructured to form the Truganina Wetlands, which filter the stormwater and provide a habitat for aquatic birds.

The park also contains picnic and barbecue facilities, with future plans for an adventure playground, climbing wall and nature trails. Truganina Park is managed by the Hobsons Bay City Council.

== Truganina Explosives Reserve ==
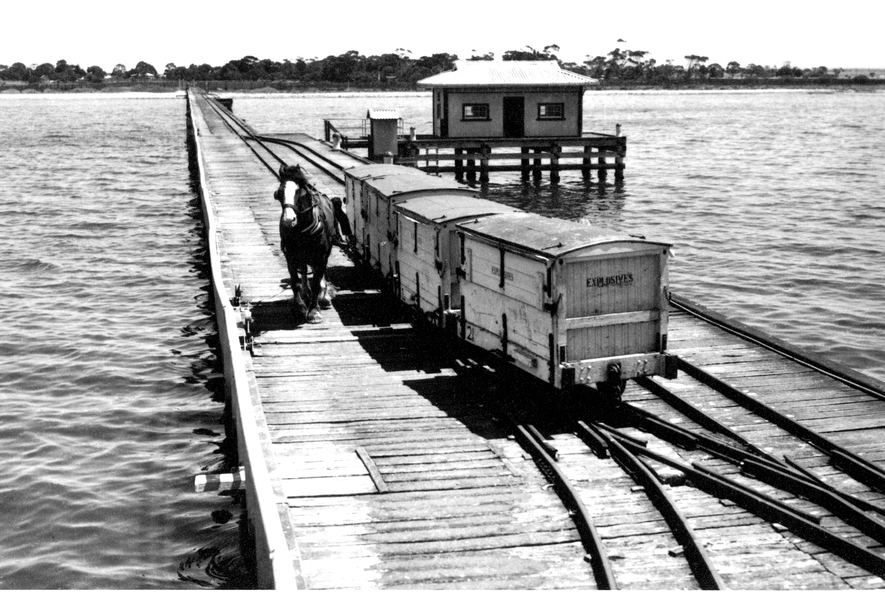
Tramway on explosives loading pier, ca 1954

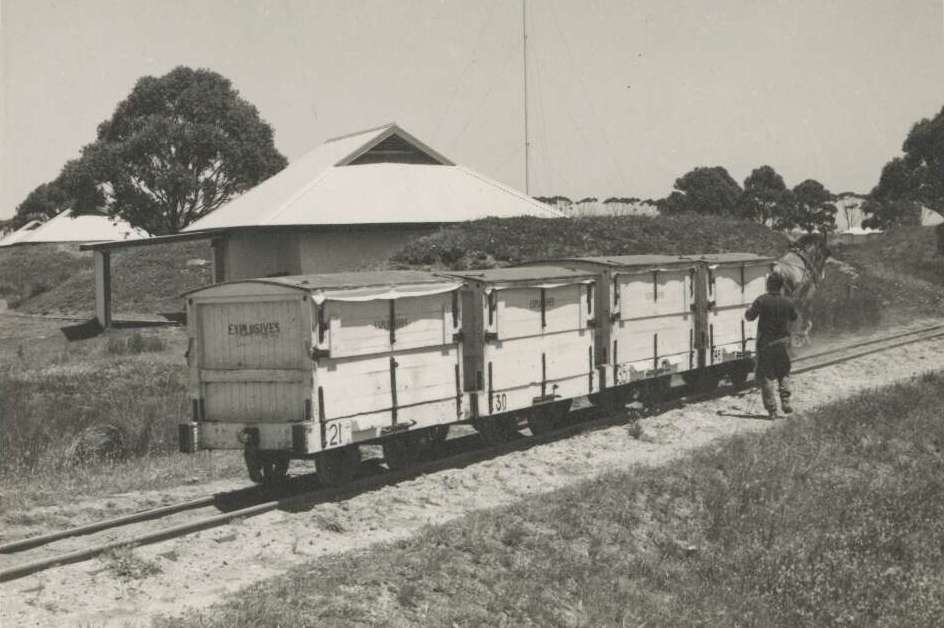
Horse-drawn explosives train, ca 1954

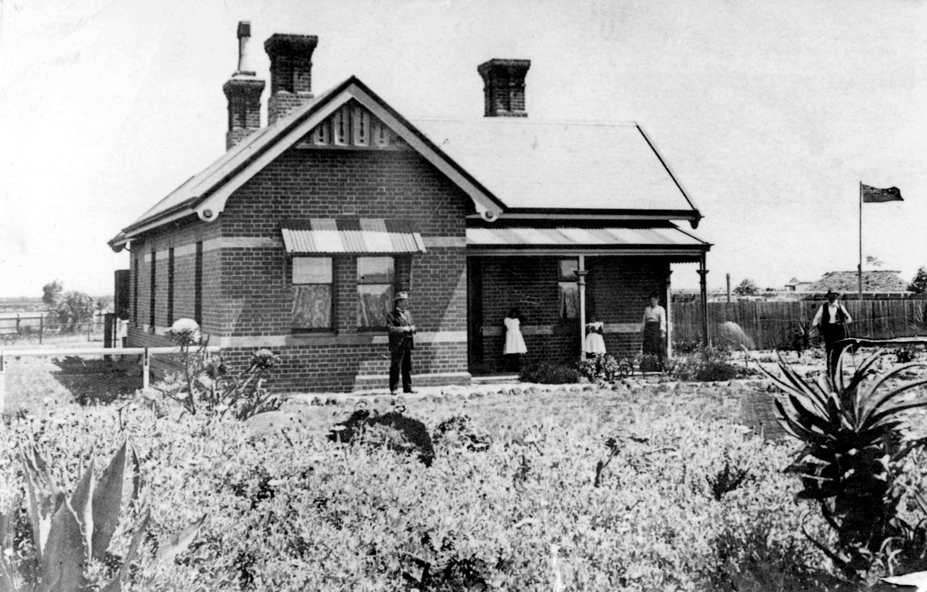
Keepers Quarters residence, ca 1915

The Truganina Explosives Reserve is a fenced-in area of 17 hectares of crown land, located 26 km west of Melbourne City at the mouth of Laverton Creek. The site was used for the handling, storage and shipping of explosives from 1901 to 1962. Explosives were manufactured at a Deer Park location and shipped out via the Magazine Pier adjacent to the reserve. These explosives were used in quarrying, mining and other industries throughout Australia. In 2000, after an extensive community campaign to save the site from sale, the site was reserved for conservation and conversion to a recreational parkland.

A series of scientific studies have identified the site as highly significant for its archaeological, geological, geomorphological, floral, fauna, cultural and industrial heritage values.

The high metal fence has protected the site from human access so the land has remained isolated for more than 100 years, growing wild, undisturbed by surrounding developments and allowing a separate indigenous ecosystem. The fence evokes a sense of enclosure, seclusion, intrigue for visitors and its continuous nature, without direct visual links to the modified external landscape, creates an atmosphere of tranquility.

Past inhabitation by Aboriginal tribes about 6500 years ago was evidenced by the unearthing of many stone artefacts from the area. The site is regarded to have a high geomorphological significance. It has several broad low ridges up to 1.5 metres high which are believed to have been deposited on the sea floor about 6000 years ago, based on radiocarbon dating of their stratified shell beds.

Distinct areas of native, exotic and saltmarsh vegetation combine with subtle undulations of the remnant dune system, resulting in landscapes of varying characters and exuding a secluded and timeless quality. The reserve is home to three bird species of state significance, the white-bellied sea eagle, Nankeen night heron and the brown quail. It also hosts four bat species, eight types of mammals and two types of reptiles.

The Hobsons Bay City Council is managing the site and together with the Truganina Explosives Reserve Preservation Society, are restoring the Reserve to its original landscape, including the restoration of the historic Keepers Residence, built in 1897 to house the Officers in Charge of the Reserve.

Public access has been limited to publicised Open Days and specially-arranged group tours while the site is being decontaminated. Decontamination of the site has recently been effected.

== Truganina Swamp ==
This 175-hectare wetland, comprising grasses, salt marsh and sedges, is fed mainly by water from Laverton Creek, which originates in Truganina. Truganina Swamp provides habitats for two endangered species – the Altona skipper butterfly, which feeds on chaffy saw sedge, and the orange-bellied parrot, which feeds on beaded glasswort and scrubland species of glasswort. The wetland is an important habitat for migratory wading birds such as pelicans, greenshanks, royal spoonbills and birds from as far as Siberia. It also supports many fish, such as black bream, common galaxias, short-finned eel, flat-headed gudgeon, Tamar River goby, small-mouthed hardyhead, goldfish, yellow-eyed mullet and mosquito fish.

The site is archaeologically important as it used to be frequented by Kooris from the Woiworung and Bunurong tribe who foraged the area for its variety of animals, fish and plant food. Historically, Truganina Swamp was a terminal swamp with no defined outlet to Port Phillip Bay. With expanding urban development in Altona, the swamp was acquired by the Board of Works (now Melbourne Water) in 1961 for drainage and flood mitigation. The Laverton Creek channel was constructed to drain water to the Bay and widened to increase its capacity for carrying floodwater. A levee bank was built on the eastern side to protect the adjacent residential areas from floodwater.

The Truganina Swamp became a haven for motorbike and trailbike riders and a dumping ground for cars and industrial rubbish. The Friends of Westona Wetlands were formed in 1993 and had persuaded Melbourne Water to install a fence to keep out illegal traffic and prevent access to ecologically-sensitive areas of the Swamp. This environmental group also worked with local companies such as Hoechst Chemicals (now Qenos) in constructing a bridge (from a disused walkway) in 1997 over the Saline Pond drain near the adjacent Port Phillip Retirement Village and Dow Chemicals in constructing a bird hide in 1998. The bird hide can be accessed from the entrance to Truganina Swamp on Bell Avenue. A walking and cycling trail encircles the swamp and links to the Hobsons Bay Coastal Trail across Queen Street.

Ongoing projects for the Swamp include monitoring of the bird species, Altona skipper butterfly and chaffy saw sedge in the area, re-vegetation, seed collecting and propagation.

== Kooringal Golf Club ==
Kooringal Golf Club is an 18-hole, 6.1 km long, par 71 course. It was inaugurated in 1946 as the Williamstown Golf Club. In 1958, its name was changed to Kooringal, an aboriginal word meaning "by the water", when Altona became a separate municipality.

The site is the last remnant of a formerly extensive series of sand ridges that run parallel to the coast between the mouth of Kororoit Creek and Skeleton Creek. The ridges consist of well-stratified shell beds, and their composition and form suggests that they were not thrown up by storm waves but were formed as sea floor ridges and spits during the mid-Holocene era, when the sea level was 1–3 metres higher than at present. The present alignment of the golf course and its use as an open-space facility preserves the general form of the ridges. The ridges are important for analysing sea level changes over the last few thousand years. The site is one of a small number of mapped and dated localities on the Victorian coast that indicates higher Holocene sea levels.

== Altona Treatment Plant ==
There are plans to open to the public, the living art sculpture named A Forest for Australia by Agnes Denes, an internationally renowned conceptual artist and a pioneer of environmental art, whose art works are often monumental in scale.

In 1998, she planted 6000 endangered trees of varying heights (red gum, she oak and paperbark) into five intersecting spirals at the Altona Treatment Plant. The tallest trees were planted in the centre of each spiral, followed by the medium-height trees and the shortest trees towards the outer edges, thus forming each spiral into a step pyramid. Her spiral design considers the height and forms of each tree type when fully grown and overcomes the problem of land erosion and desertification at the site.
