= Truganina Explosives Reserve =

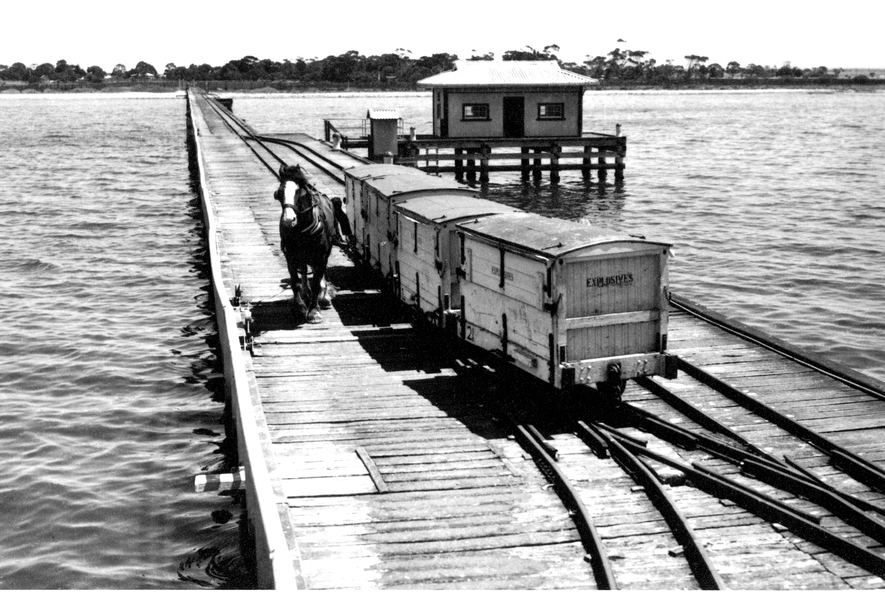
- Tramway on explosives loading pier

- Location in Victoria

General information
- Status: Unoccupied
- Type: Former government magazine
- Location: 276 Queen Street, Altona, Victoria, City of Hobsons Bay, Australia
- Coordinates: 37°52′39″S 144°48′21″E
- Construction started: 1901
- Completed: 1961
- Owner: Victorian Government

Dimensions
- Other dimensions: 15 hectares (37 acres)

The Truganina Explosives Reserve was a secure storage facility near Altona in the Australian state of Victoria. It was in operation from 1901 to 1962 to store mainly civilian explosives for mining and construction. The camp included several storage sheds and a jetty, which were connected by a narrow-gauge horse-drawn tramway. Like the Dry Creek explosives depot at Port Adelaide, the site is a testimony to history and transportation in Australia.

== Location ==
Altona's Truganina Explosives Reserve is located approximately 10 miles (16 km) south-west of Melbourne, and 5 miles (8 km) west of Williamstown on the shores of Port Phillip Bay.

== History ==
The Nobel explosives factory (later ICI, then Orica) in Deer Park was set-up in 1873 to produce explosives, especially gelignite and dynamite, for quarries, mines, as well as for road, rail, dam and tunnel construction with the intention to become independent of imports from Britain and South Africa. These explosives were initially stored in specially designed magazines (Jack's Magazine) on the banks of the Maribyrnong River, upstream of Footscray, before being shipped to other parts of Australia or to New Zealand, New Guinea and the Pacific. As the population of Footscray increased, a more remote location for explosives storage was sought. In 1900, Altona had less than fifty inhabitants. The Truganina Explosives Reserve, located less than 4 kilometres (2.5 mi) from Laverton railway station, was finally selected as a convenient location for a new explosives storage site due to its secluded coastal location.

Most of the land had been owned by George Thomas Chirnside, before he agreed in 1896 to swap 225 hectares (560 acres) of his land against 256 hectares (630 acres) of poor quality land of the government of Victoria. The Victorian Government's Victorian Act 1456 is known as the Powder Magazines Act of 1896. A Victorian Act authorized the governor to exchange this land to set-up an explosives reserve and to build and operate a narrow gauge railway line.

== Narrow-gauge tramway ==
Truganina Explosives Reserve Tramway
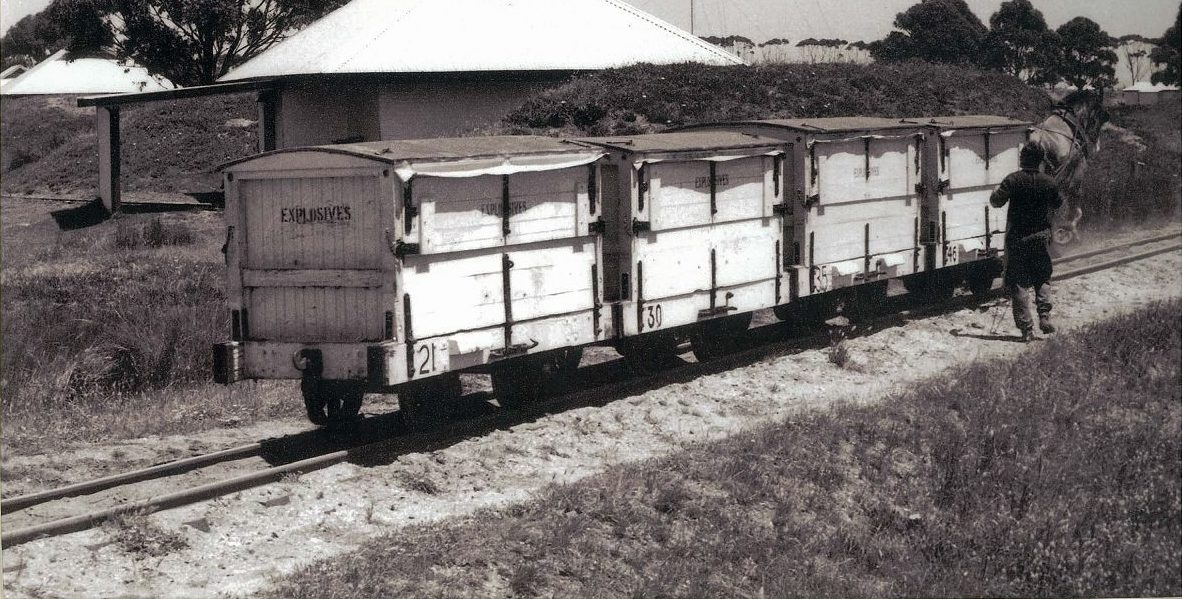
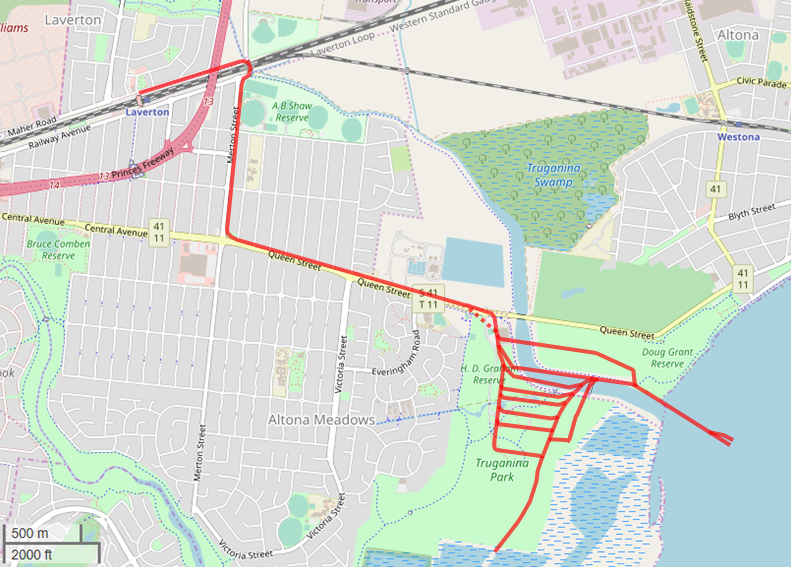
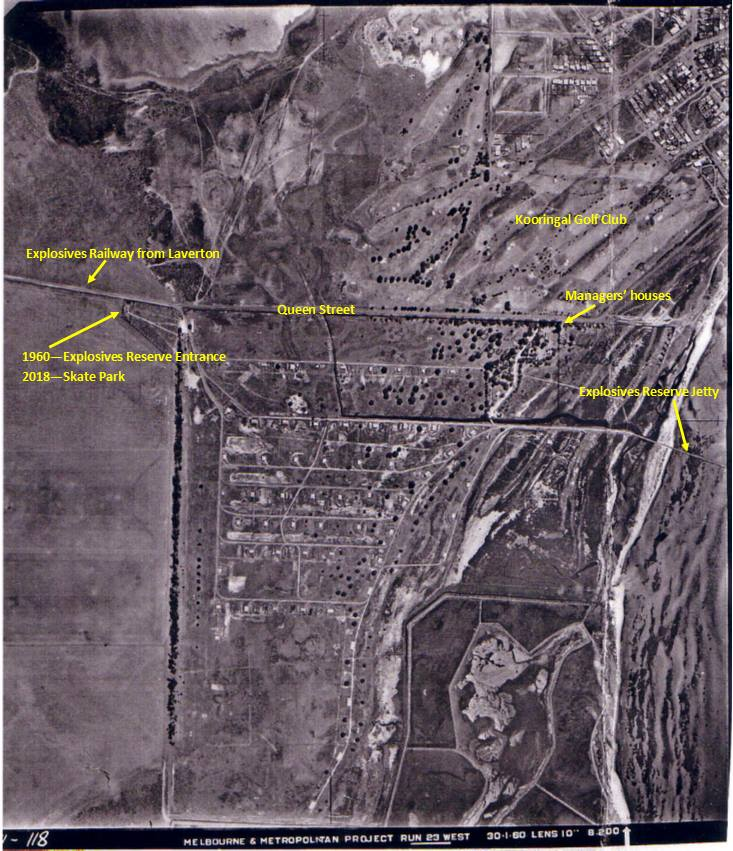
- Horse-drawn explosives train Route of the former tramway Aerial photography, 30 January 1960

Technical
- Line length: 2.7 kilometres (1.7 mi)
- Track gauge: 600 mm (1 ft 11 5/8 in)
- Operating speed: 4.5 km/h (2.8 mph)

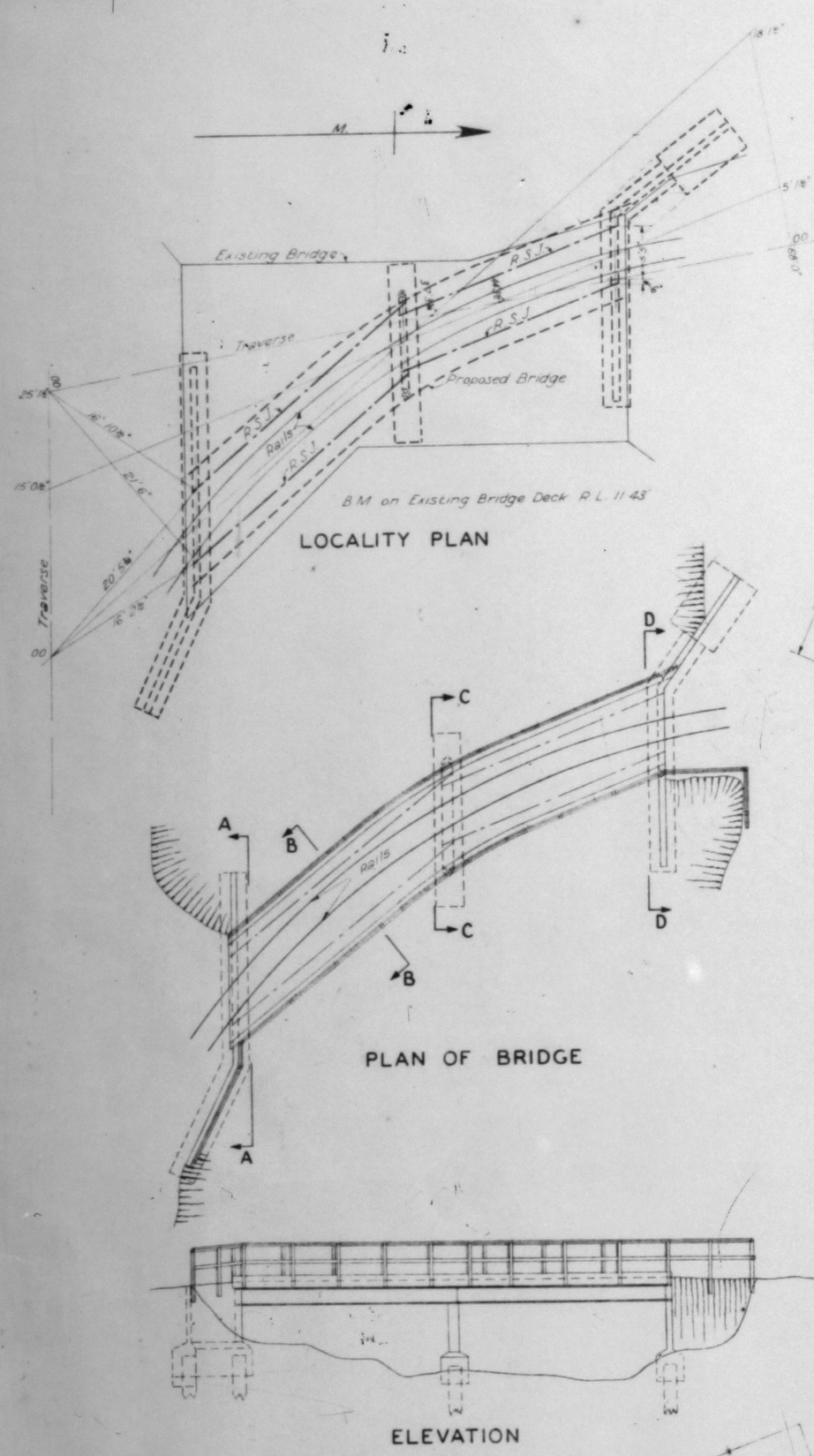
Drawing of tramway bridge, 25 November 1940

The 610 mm (2 ft) narrow-gauge tramway line began at Laverton railway station and ran along what are now Merton Street and Queen Street through the Truganina Explosives Reserve and then to a jetty at Laverton Creek on Altona Bay. It had eight passing loops parallel to the mainline at the storage facility, as well as sheds and dead-end sidings at Laverton station.

Explosives were delivered by the Victorian Railways from the factory in Deer Park to Laverton railway station. There, the explosives were reloaded by human chain from the railway wagons into the horse-drawn narrow-gauge wagons. The narrow-gauge railway wagons were then hauled by Clydesdale draft horses at a speed of about 4.5 kilometres per hour (3 mph) to the explosives reserve. The narrow-gauge railway line was 2.7 km (133 chains) long. It was in operation until 1936, when rail transport was replaced by road transport. Upon arriving at the reserve, the explosives were stored in the magazines, until they were taken to be loaded onto ships for onward transport. Nine explosives transports were carried out each day with 200 explosives boxes of 50 pounds (22.7 kg) each. Nine horses and 43 wagons were used.

When the explosives had to be shipped to other ports, the explosive boxes were taken by narrow-gauge railway to small boats (lighters) moored at the pier. The specially designed motor-less sailing ships were towed by tugs from the jetty to their moorings at Williamstown. From there lighters took their cargo to larger ships anchored at special explosives buoys in Port Philip Bay.

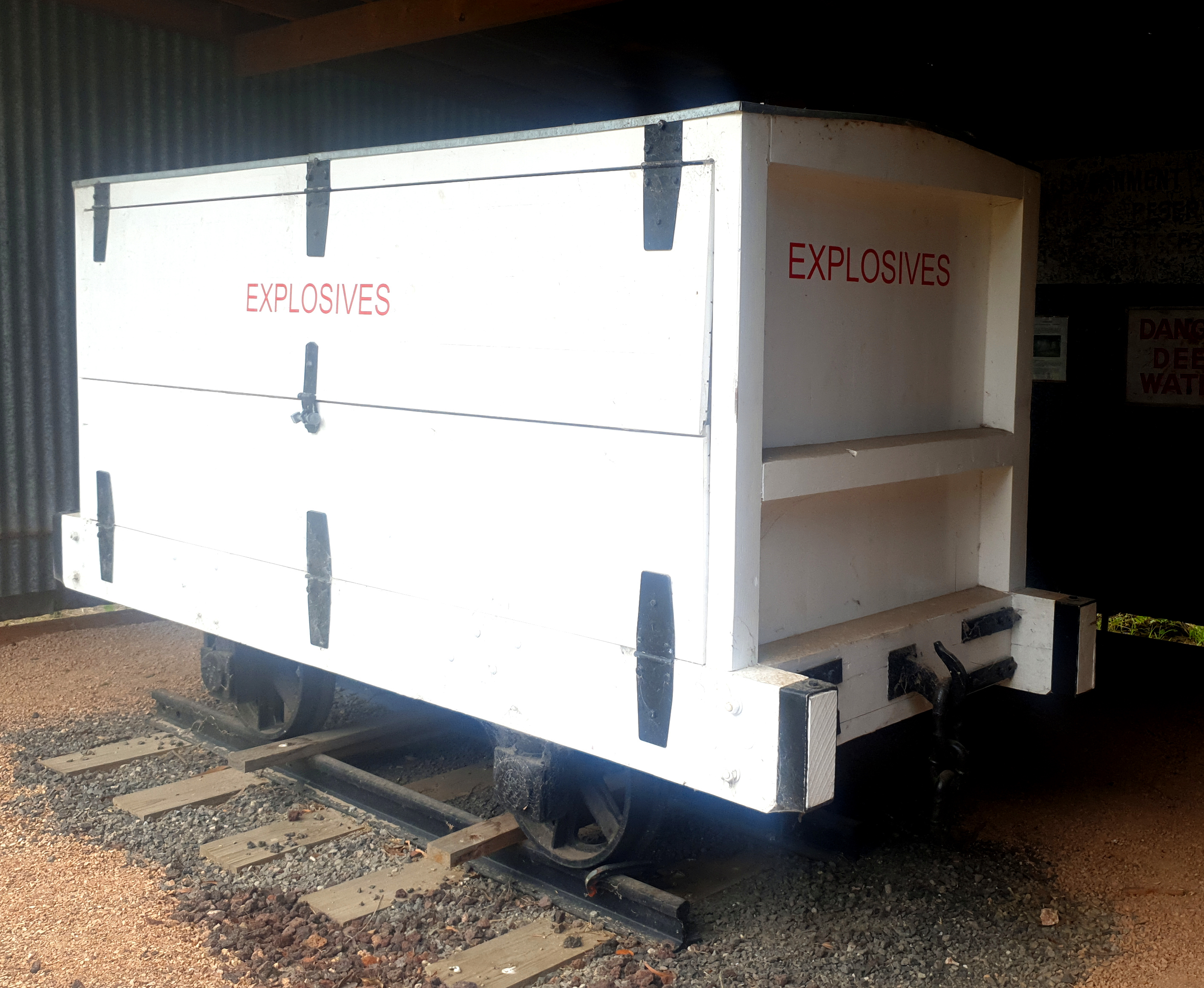
One of the preserved tramway's carriages on display at the explosives reserve

== Magazines ==
Each magazine had a size of about 9 by 5.5 metres (30 by 18 ft) and could store 20 tons of explosives. The magazines were made of brick, with tile roofs. The roofs were not attached to the walls - they stayed there under their own weight. This was so that, in the event of an explosion, the roof would lift off, minimising damage to the building. The explosives were stacked on air-permeable shelves, so that air could circulate around the boxes at any time. The wooden boxes for explosives were made with brass nails or with only dovetail joints to minimize the possibility of sparking. Each magazine was surrounded on three sides by a large earth wall, with an open side facing away from human activity. These earthworks were designed to protect the workers and their families from explosions. If such an explosion had taken place, the mounds were designed to direct the explosion upwards and outwards and contain the damage. The magazines were built as light as possible to minimize damage caused by flying splinters, with the same design as used in Yatala and Port Adelaide.

== Operation ==
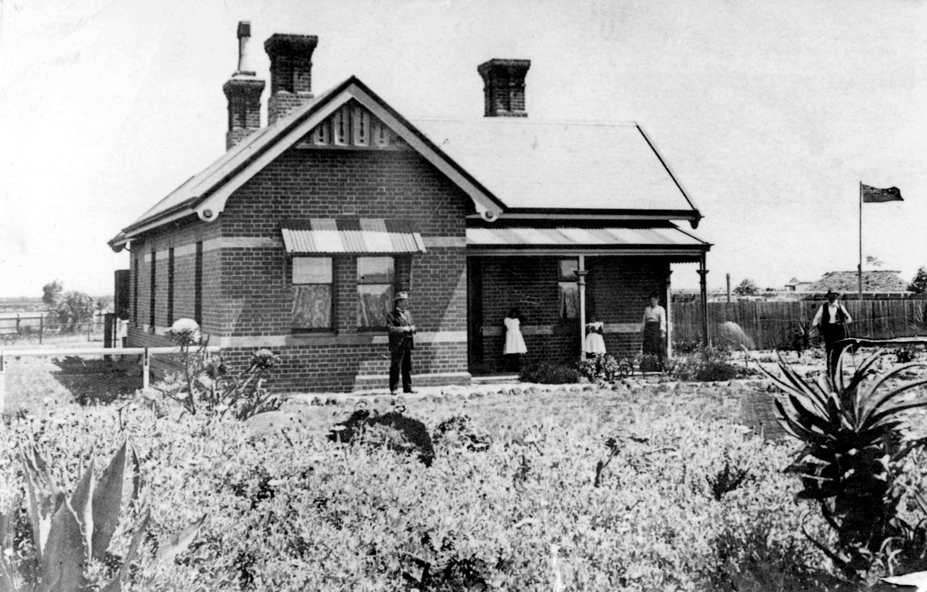
Keeper's Quarters residence, ca 1915

The operation of the explosives reserve and the narrow gauge railway was managed by the Trade and Customs Commissioner. The site was officially opened on 1 May 1901, and was enclosed by a 8 feet (2.4 m) high, 7 miles (11 km) long galvanized corrugated iron fence. Careful handling, transportation and storage of the explosive was of paramount importance to ensure safety for employees and residents. Employees who handled the explosives were instructed to wear leather aprons to protect their clothes and to wear canvas overshoes to prevent sparks. Boots with nailed leather soles were considered too dangerous, because of the possibility of the nails causing sparks, which could have resulted in an explosion.

By 1950, the explosives storage in Altona had reached its peak. Sixty-one magazines were in operation. Of these, 52 were used by Nobel Industries, which became later Imperial Chemical Industries of Australia and New Zealand (ICIANZ), and nine by the state government. A total of 36 employees were employed in the explosives reserve. During this time, the population of Altona grew to 4,000. Therefore, the risk of explosives storage in Altona was re-assessed and alternative locations were evaluated. On 11 May 1962, the auxiliary sailing ship Failie became the last vessel to be loaded at the Truganina explosives reserve; all remaining explosives were transported to a newly built explosives warehouse at Point Wilson. The first delivery from Point Wilson took place on 25 May 1962.

After the closure of the Truganina Explosives Reserve in 1962, the Victorian Government sold most of the land, but retained 16 hectares (40 acres) for the State Labour Inspectorate for Destruction of Dangerous Goods. Until closed in 1994, unwanted explosives from throughout Victoria were brought to this site for safe destruction in a specially constructed bunker. In 1976, 0.8 hectares (2 acres) of the 16 hectares were transferred to the State Environmental Protection Agency for use as a vehicle test station, which was closed in June 1999. In June 2000, the Government of Victoria commissioned the Hobsons Bay City Council to administer the former Truganina Explosives Reserve on their behalf as a recreational park.

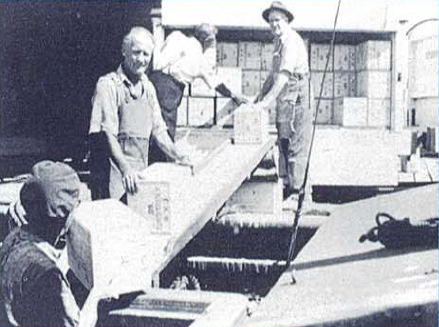

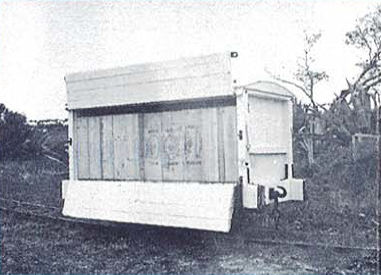

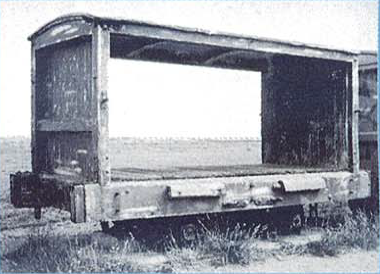

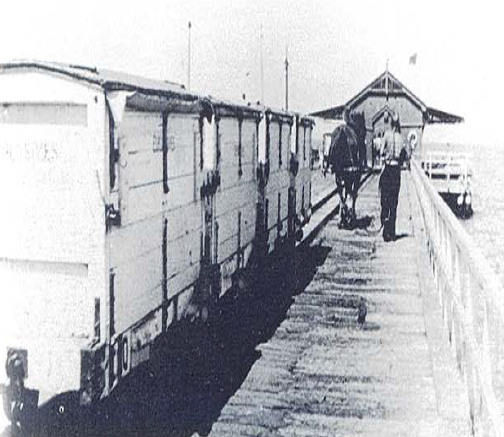

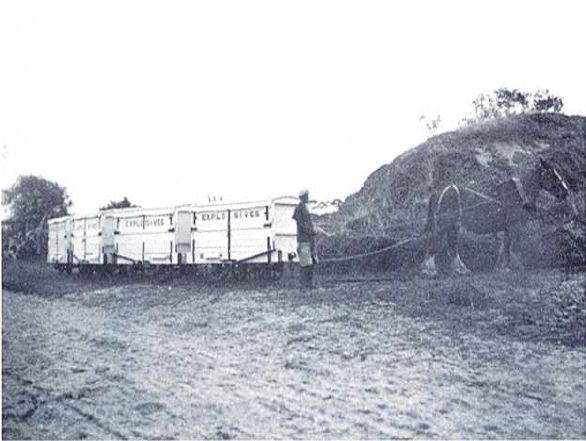

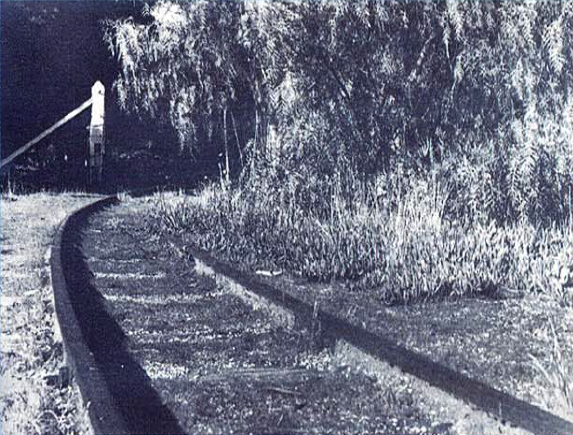

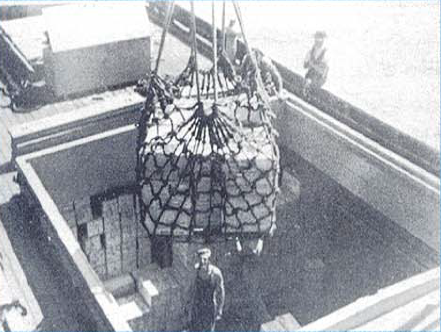

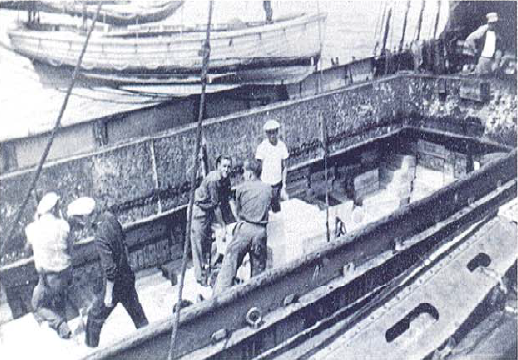

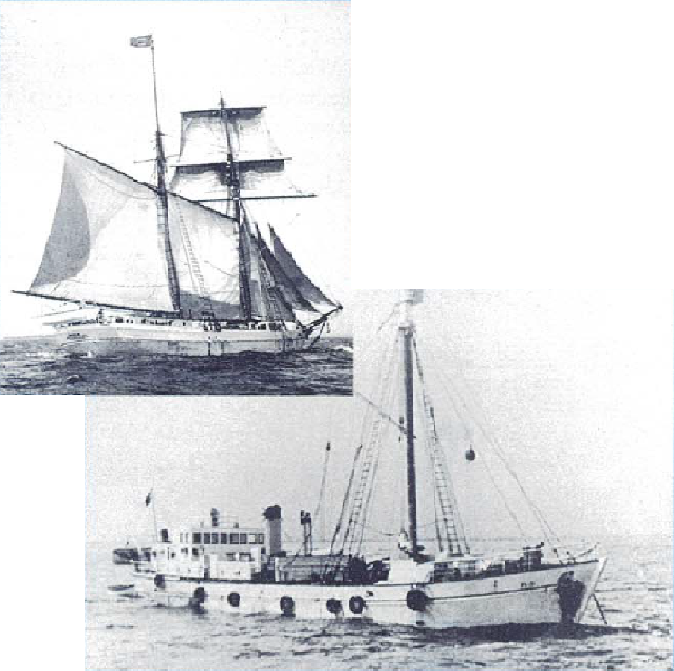

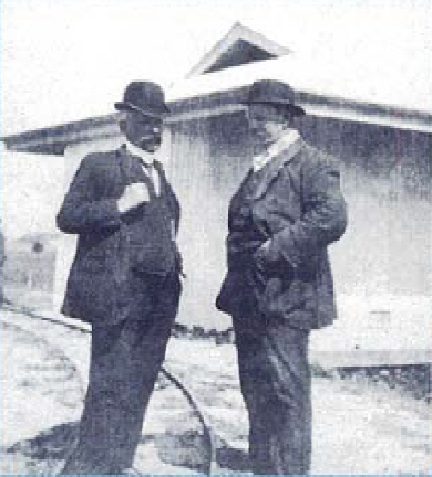

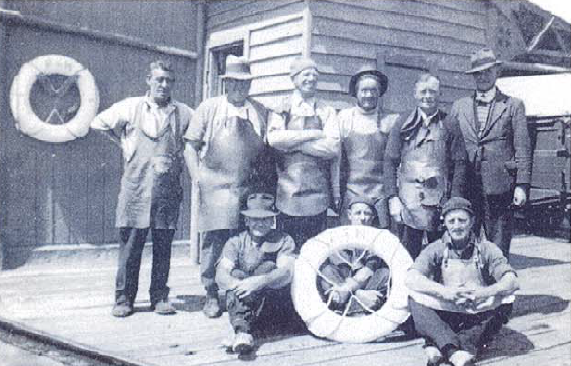

== Accidents and incidents ==
There were no significant accidents during operation. The stables in Truganina's explosives reserve were burnt down in 1904, presumably by a swagman, however the suspect was not arrested for lack of evidence.

On 9 April 1946 an ammunition lighter had grounded in a storm and was feared to be in danger of blowing up. It was loaded with 300 tons of ammunition, mainly shells. The ammunition could not be unloaded at low tide onto trucks, because of seaweed and the softness of the sand. Thus it was tried to pull the lighter back into the sea by tugs during high tide.

== Conservation and protection of landscape, culture and monuments ==
=== Plants and animals ===
The 16 hectares (40 acres) salt marshes and ancient sand dunes have a high conservation value and are the location of rare animal and plant species. Areas of indigenous, exotic and saline vegetation and the hills of the dune system form landscapes with different characteristics that seem timeless. The high corrugated sheet metal fence has protected the site from human entry, leaving it largely undisturbed for more than 100 years, creating a natural, native ecosystem. The reserve is home to three species of birds of local importance, the white-bellied sea eagle, Nankeen night heron and the brown quail. It also houses four bat species including chocolate wattled bat, white-striped free-tailed bat, south-eastern slider, eight other species of mammals and two species of reptiles. The Altona skipper butterfly is a rare and threatened species of butterfly, which has its main habitat at only at two other local sites, where it can find chaffey saw sedge (Ghania filum) to feed from.

=== Cultural significance ===
Archaeological research on the property has uncovered many stone artifacts, including ground-edge axes, anvils and hammer-stones, indicating that the land was inhabited by Aboriginal tribes in the coastal area for some 6,500 years. Remnants of indigenous settlement were also found on the property, which together with the artifacts show that the area was used as a storage area. The Department of Treasury and Finance conducted archeological investigations in the former explosives reserve in 1995 and 1996, during which consultants found six artifact sites but no scarred trees, hearths, hearth stones, bone remains or shell scatters.

The area is part of the traditional land of the Yalukit-willam clan, which settled in the coastal areas that stretch from the northern shores of Port Phillip to Wilson's Promontory. Little is known about the lifestyle of the Yalukit-willam clan. The Wurrundjeri Tribe Land Compensation Council and the Council of Cultural Heritage take care of the region's cultural heritage.

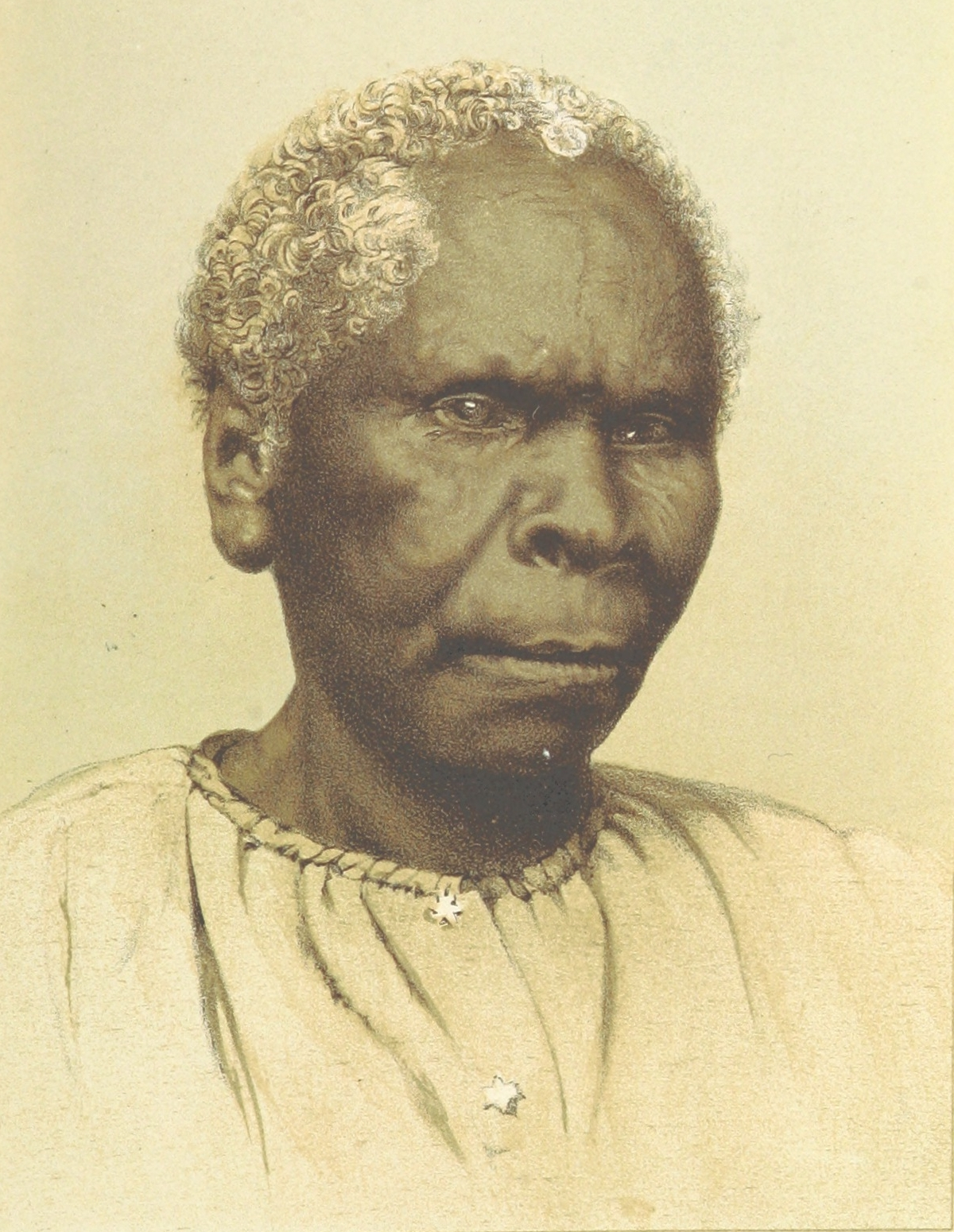
Truganini, 1870

The name of the explosives reserve is derived from Truganini (1812-1876), who was long considered the last true Aboriginal Tasmanian. She was a daughter of the tribal elder Mananga of the Aborigines of Bruny Island.

=== Remains of buildings ===
The Truganina Explosives Reserve is listed under Hermes number 70270 in the Victorian Heritage Database Report. The historical attributes of the site are of Regional Significance. The site is still state owned and has been nominated for listing in the Victorian State Heritage Register. The Keepers Quarters residence is already listed as a local heritage by the Hobson's Bay City Council.

=== Remains of the tramway ===
Only little remains of the former tramway have survived. The only visible part of the route can be seen on the south side of the reserve, where it ran in a curve through a gate towards the pier. Some rails with the embossing "WIW Australia" and a crown symbol are embedded in a concrete channel. The crown symbol is probably a trademark of the Commonwealth Steel Company, whose Waratah Iron Works supplied many railways. The route then disappears there underneath the earthworks of a modern footpath.

The railway embankment, which was made of bluestone ballast, became visible during road works on the northeast corner of Queen Street and Merton Street. At this point the right of way of the narrow-gauge tramway line ran with a suitable radius over the property situated at the corner. Another section of the road is preserved near the ford westwards of Merton Street, again only as the earth dam, which turns west from the entrance to Laverton railway station and is partly overbuilt with a modern cycle path. The rails and sleepers are missing in these two sections and other sections of the routes within the reserve, but gravel and few metal artifacts are still visible. The sections within the reserve are either buried or overgrown.
