= Cheetham and Altona Important Bird Area =

Group of wetland sites in Australia

Coordinates: 37°53′27″S 144°48′12″E

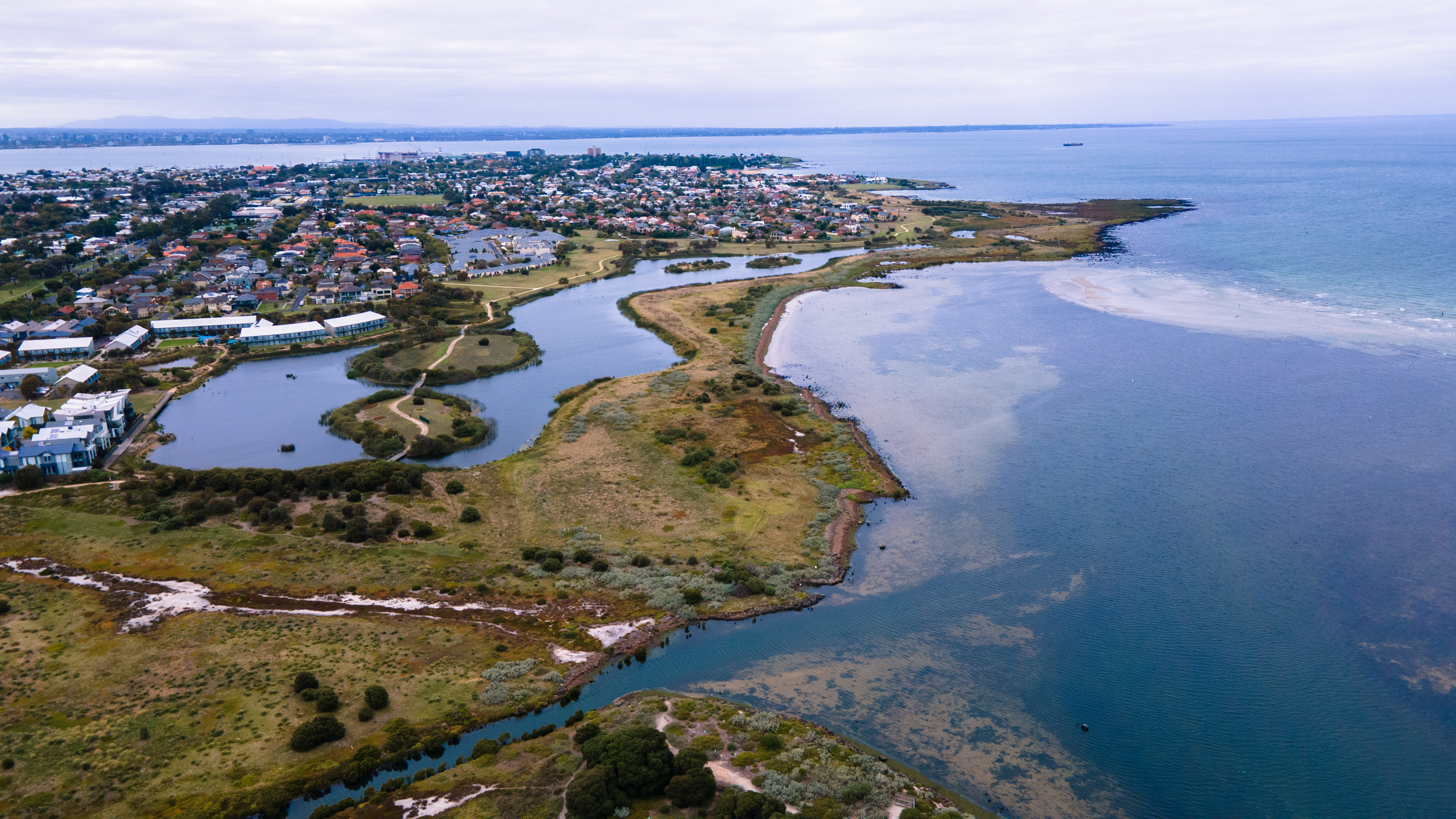
Aerial view of the Jawbone Reserve, looking east towards Williamstown

The Cheetham and Altona Important Bird Area comprises several wetland sites on, or close to, the north-western coast of Port Phillip in Victoria, south-eastern Australia. Collectively they total 1223 ha in area and lie within, or adjacent to, the western suburbs of the city of Melbourne. They were classified as an Important Bird Area (IBA) because they support more than 1% of the world populations of red-necked stint, chestnut teal and Pacific gull.

== Wetlands ==
The IBA includes the undeveloped coast between Williamstown and Seaholme, including the Jawbone Reserve, Altona Coastal Park, Rowden's Swamp, the Cheetham Wetlands, Truganina Swamp, with the Spectacle Lakes complex and RAAF Lake of Point Cook Coastal Park. These contain all the remaining freshwater wetlands, saltpans, intertidal mudflats and shallow inshore waters which support the key bird species.
