= Cheetham Wetlands =

Wetlands at Port Phillip Bay, Victoria, Australia

Coordinates: 37.895°S 144.795°E

The Cheetham Wetlands are 420 hectares of artificial and natural lagoons, created on old salt works land on the western shores of Port Phillip Bay, Australia. The wetlands are approximately 20 kilometres (12 mi) southwest of Melbourne, and sit within the Municipal Councils of Hobsons Bay and Wyndham City.

The wetlands are part of the Point Cook Coastal Park and are crown land for conservation purposes. The area is currently managed by the Department of Sustainability & Environment and Melbourne Water, with Parks Victoria informally managing the area to the north of the wetlands. They are protected under the Ramsar Convention.

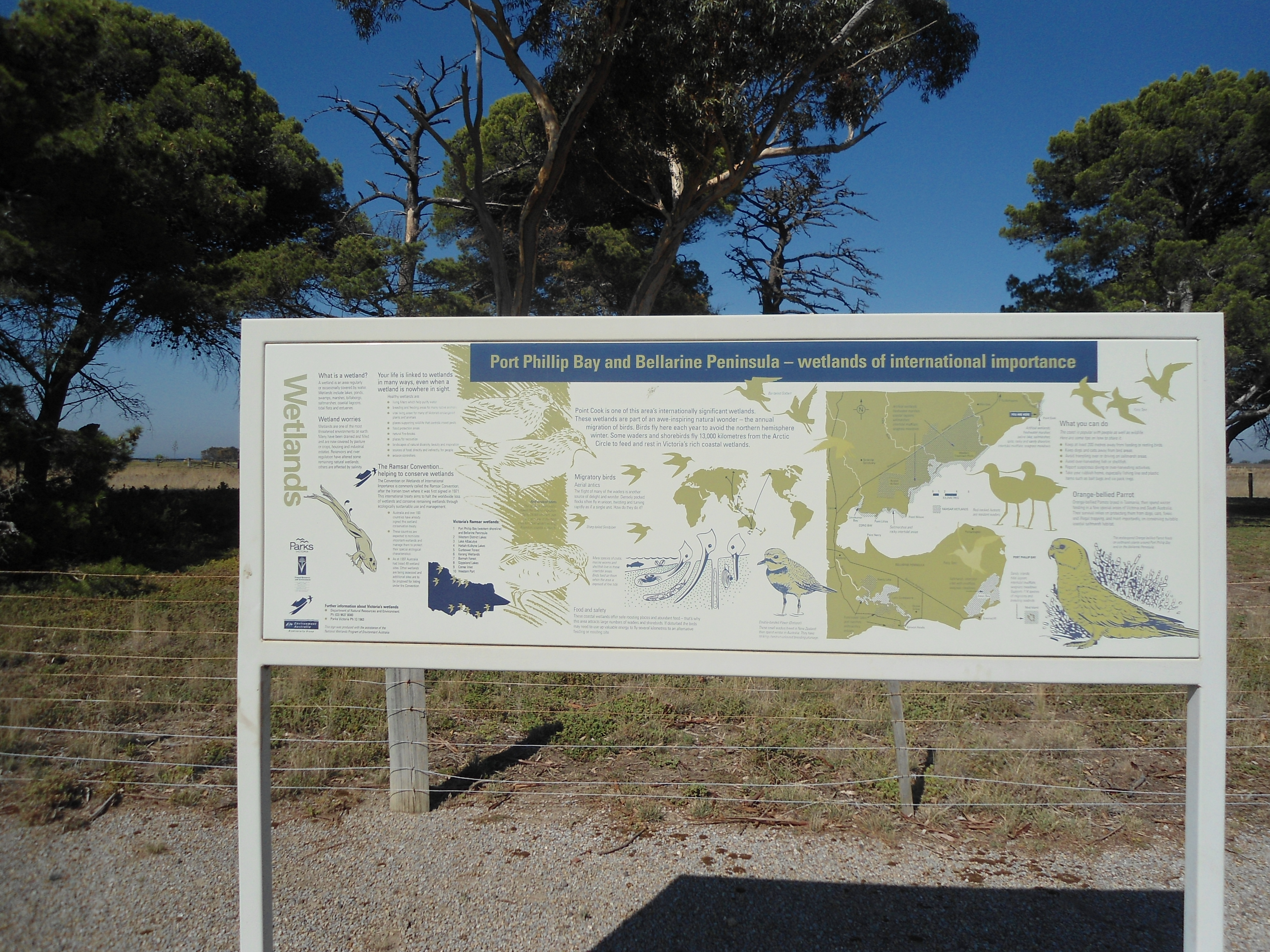
Cheetham Wetlands Map at the entrance to the park.

== Land use ==
The Cheetham Wetlands were originally a natural salt marsh and grassy woodlands; the area was later used as a saltworks. The later use created the lagoons, which attract many birds to the area. In 1996, the land was set aside to protect the wetland system and its diverse fauna and flora, including migratory birds.

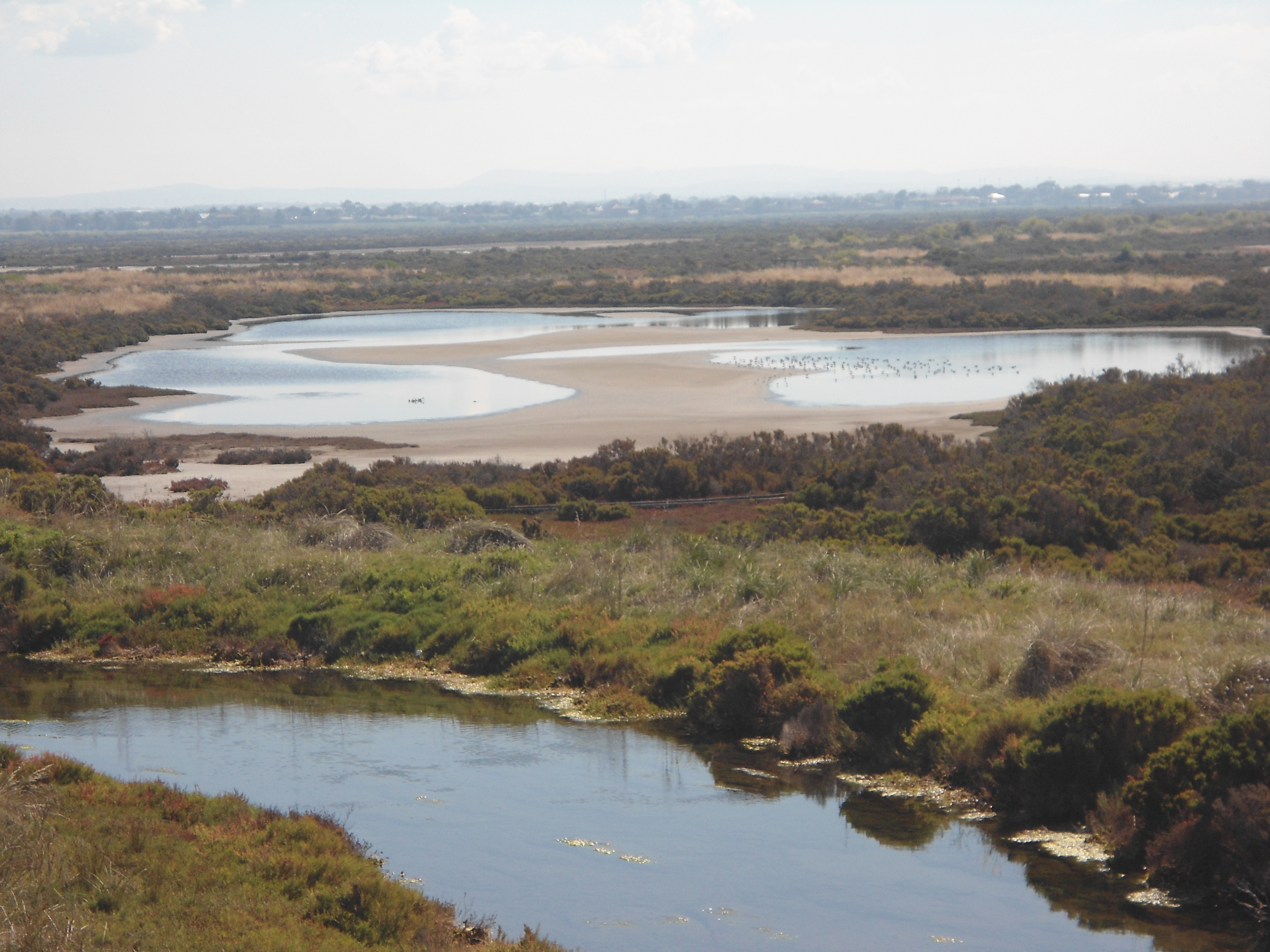
View of Cheetham Wetlands from the viewing deck.

== Ecological processes ==
Even though Cheetham Wetlands is made up of artificial wetland lagoons, the ecological processes that they create are significant in sustaining values under the Ramsar Convention. The wetlands also provide the following functions:

- Ground water recharge or discharge;
- Water purification;
- Water storage;
- Nutrient recycling;
- Sewage treatment;
- Shoreline stability; and
- Retention of sediment.

== Significant species ==
The Cheetham Wetlands has been known to support over two hundred species of birds, with many birds returning each year. The birds found in the area breed mainly in the Northern Hemisphere during the summer months and migrate to the Southern Hemisphere between July and November; bird numbers peak in the Point Cook Coastal Park area between September and March.

The Wetlands currently support significant populations of:

- Red-necked stint (Calidris ruficollis)
- Red-necked avocet (Recurvirostra novaehollandiae)
- Sharp-tailed sandpiper (Calidris acuminata)
- Double-banded plover (Charadrius bicinctus)
- Common greenshank (Tringa nebularia)
- Marsh sandpiper (Tringa stagnatilis)
- Curlew sandpiper (Calidris ferruginea)
- Orange-bellied parrot (Neophema chrysogaster)
- Fairy tern (Sterna nereis)
- Common tern (Sterna hirundo)
- Yellow sedge-skipper (Hesperilla flavescens)

== Environmental threats ==
Wetland areas have been identified as some of the most threatened habitats in the world. The Cheetham Wetlands are no exception and are currently under threat by a number of natural and man-made sources.

=== Urban encroachment ===
One of the biggest threats is encroachment on the land, especially from the rapidly expanding municipality of Wyndham City. In Victoria’s integrated planning document, Melbourne 2030, the Werribee growth area was identified as one of five growth areas. The urban land boundary for Wyndham abuts Point Cook Coastal Park to the west and north. The increased demand for housing and development in the area has and will continue to change the nature and character of Point Cook Coastal Park and Cheetham Wetlands.

=== Water quality ===
Decreasing water quality of the wetlands due to storm water treatment, drainage and hard rubbish has also been identified as a threat. The wetlands' water levels are managed by pumping and water flow controls onsite. The correct maintenance and operation of these processes is critical to maintaining the Ramsar sites. Pumping water into the wetlands when there are high freshwater flows can result in sediment and nutrient pollution from storm water.

=== Pests ===
Further threats have been identified in the area, with disturbance of migratory shorebirds and their habitats by human activities. Examples are allowing pets in the area and the area being used as a recreational reserve. There is also a significant threat posed by introduced or exotic fauna and flora species, including feral cats, foxes and rabbits.

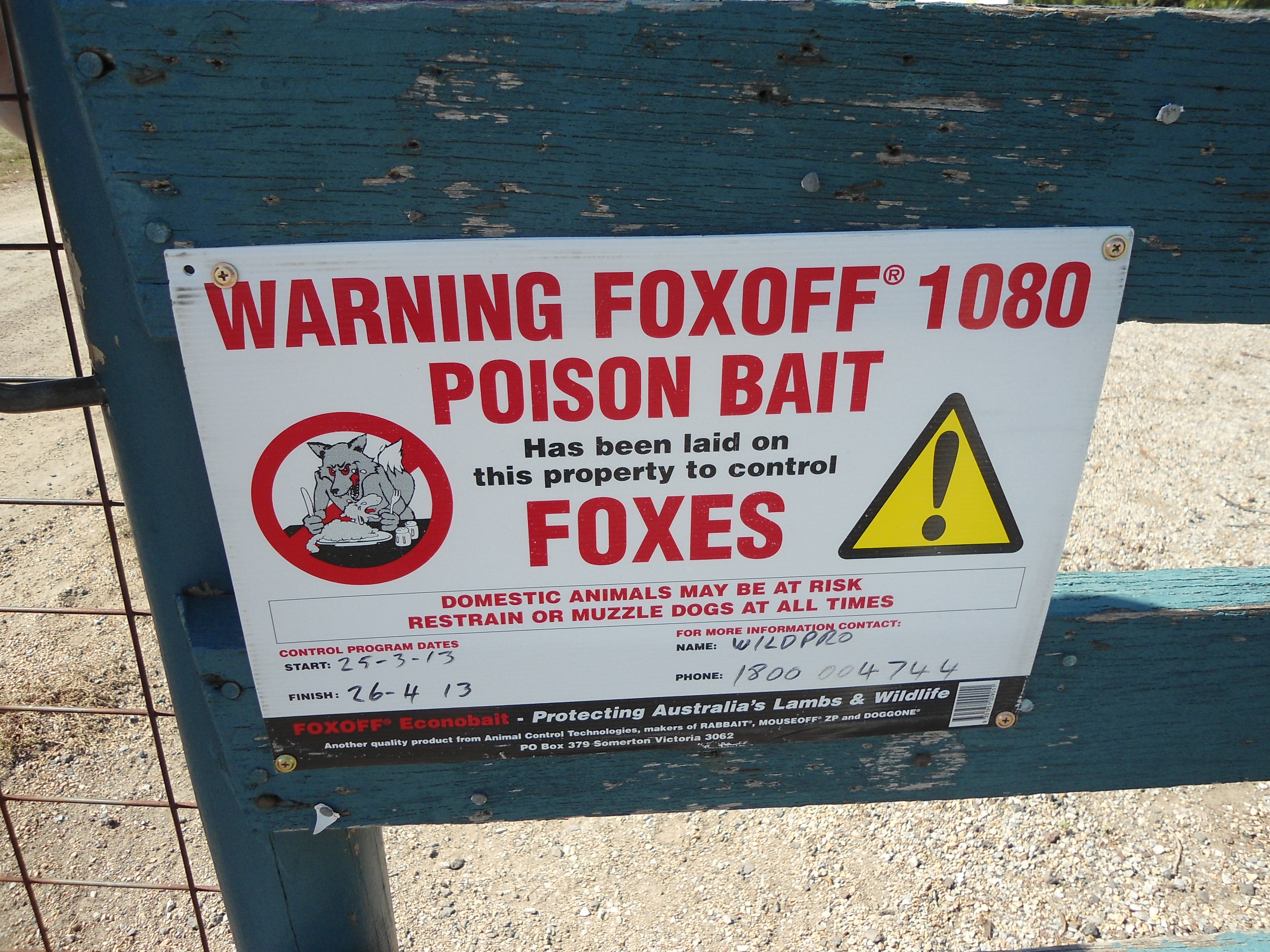
Pest signage at Cheetham Wetlands

=== Management and conservation programs ===
Cheetham Wetlands has been identified as a significant environmental area and as such management, conservation and protection plans have been implemented are currently implemented or being developed for the future.

Some of the programs currently being undertaken onsite include:

- Melbourne Water in conjunction with Hobson’s Bay Council recently planted a 4 kilometres (2.5 mi) stretch of land within the wetlands, with indigenous plants. This has restored canopy and habitat connectivity to the area. The hope is that this will encourage native species into the area and provide some coverage from pests.
- Cheetham Wetlands was chosen as one of 10 sites under the "Revive our Wetlands focus project", with financial assistance provided from 2004-2006. This program was created to engage the community in conservation, restore habitat for endangered species, improve water quality, reduce litter and help record accurate wildlife records.
- Significant salt marsh regeneration and planting of Thatching grass (Gahnia filum) has been done at the wetlands. This included the removal of invasive woody weed boxthorn (Lycium ferocissimum). This weed species competes with the Thatching grass, which is necessary for the survival of the Yellow Sedge-Skipper (Hesperilla Flavescens).
- The Shorebird Conservation Project (SCP), which is funded by the Natural Heritage Trust and coordinated by WWF Australia. This project aims to increase awareness, understanding and involvement by local people in conservation of habitat, and enable communities to conserve and wisely manage important shorebird sites.
- The Ramsar Protection Plan (pest plant and animal control program), funded by the Caring for our Country program. This program is aimed at conserving areas of national significance and combatting the issues of weed and feral animals within these areas. As part of this program 200 hectares of the wetlands will have rabbit proof fencing installed.
- River Health Program: Improving protection for the Cheetham Wetlands and water quality entering the bay, through implementing priority actions from the Melton and Wyndham Storm water management Plan.

=== Benefits of management ===
Management practices implemented have included limiting access to the wetland and allowing walking only, into the grassland area abutting the wetlands, creating designated walking tracks and boardwalks and offering two viewing decks of the area. These practices help to ensure that the natural habitats of the wetlands are not disturbed and can be conserved. After a study conducted in 2008, it was found that people were still accessing areas of the Point Cook Coastal Park, including the Cheetham Wetlands that were off bounds to the general public. This study gave management an indication that these types of activities occurred more during holiday periods. To combat this further signage was erected and patrols were set up for peak times.

Management programs, including listing the site as a Ramsar wetland, the creation of the Port Phillip Bay (Western Shoreline) and Bellarine Peninsular Ramsar Site: Strategic Management Plan, and declaring the area around Point Cook Coastal Park as a marine reserve, all contribute to the conservation of Cheetham wetlands. The area being listed as a Ramsar site ensures that any proposed development in the area must go through an EPBC process as a minimum. The creation of the Port Phillip Bay (Western Shoreline) and Bellarine Peninsular Ramsar Site: Strategic Management Plan identified key threats to the sites and assessed and proposed implementation of strategies to combat these threats.

Management of the water regime for the Cheetham Wetlands, which is dependent on the pumping of seawater from the estuary of Skeleton Creek, also contributes to the conservation of the area. In the late 1980s, the area was still managed as a salt works and pumping of seawater and salt production were suspended for two years. By the second year, summer counts of waterbirds had declined by 85%. The resumption of pumping resulted in an immediate recovery in waterbird numbers.

The ongoing conservation programs listed above also benefit the unique and varying flora and fauna species that inhabit the area. Of particular note is the conservation of habitats for the Orange-Bellied Parrot and the Yellowish-Sedge Skipper, both of which are listed as critically endangered.

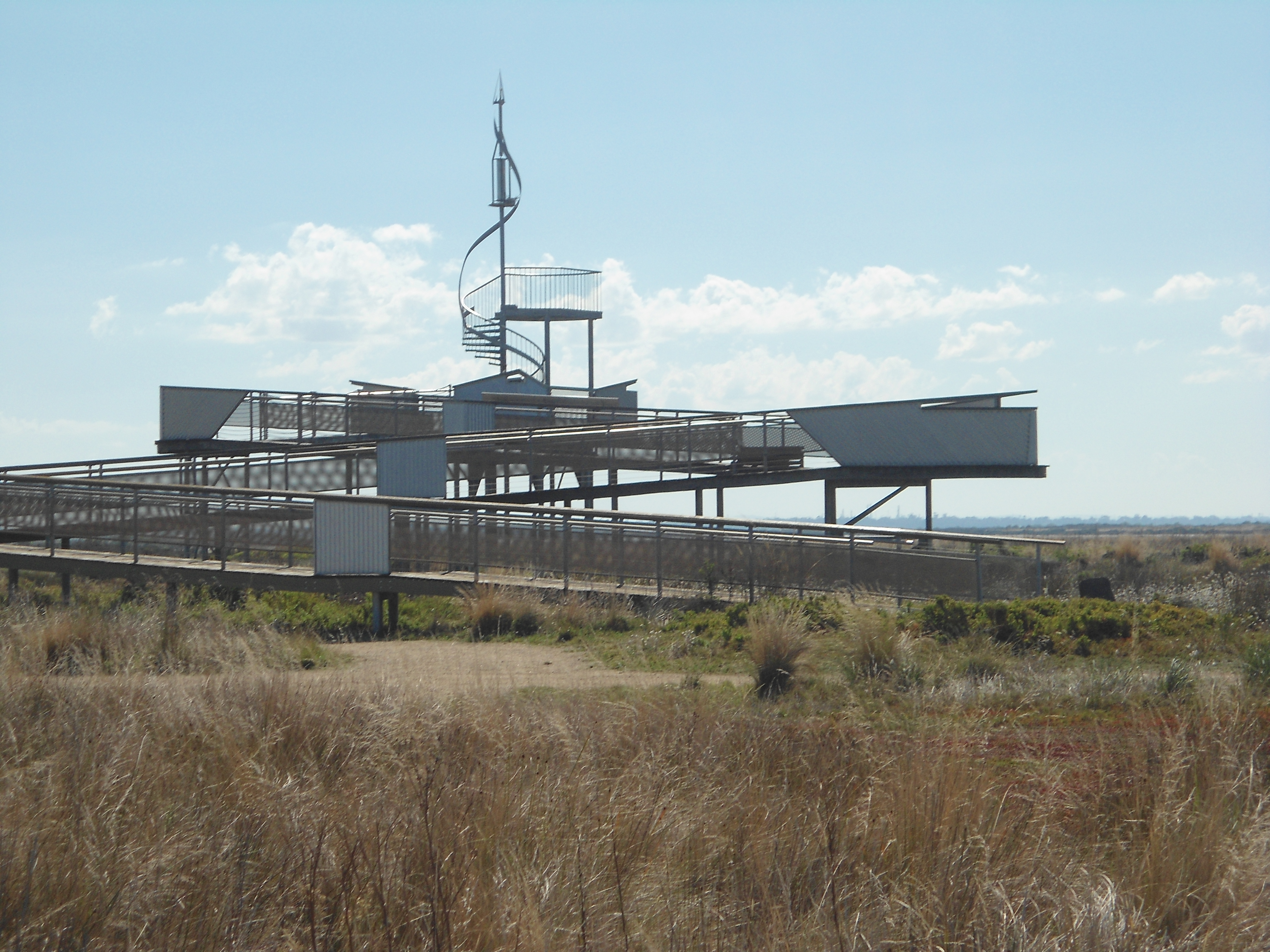
The Tower viewing deck at Cheetham Wetlands
