= Altona Beach =

Beach in Victoria, Australia

Coordinates: 37°52′20″S 144°49′15″E

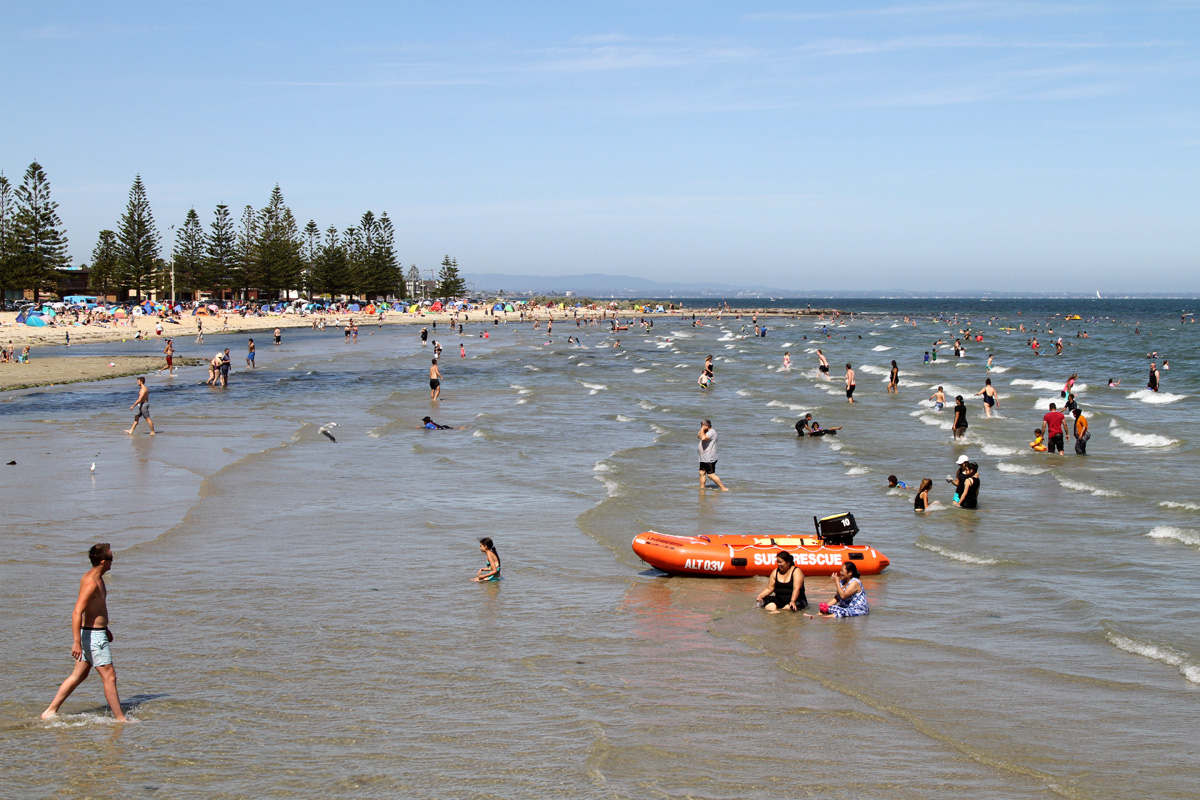
Looking east from the pier on a summer's afternoon

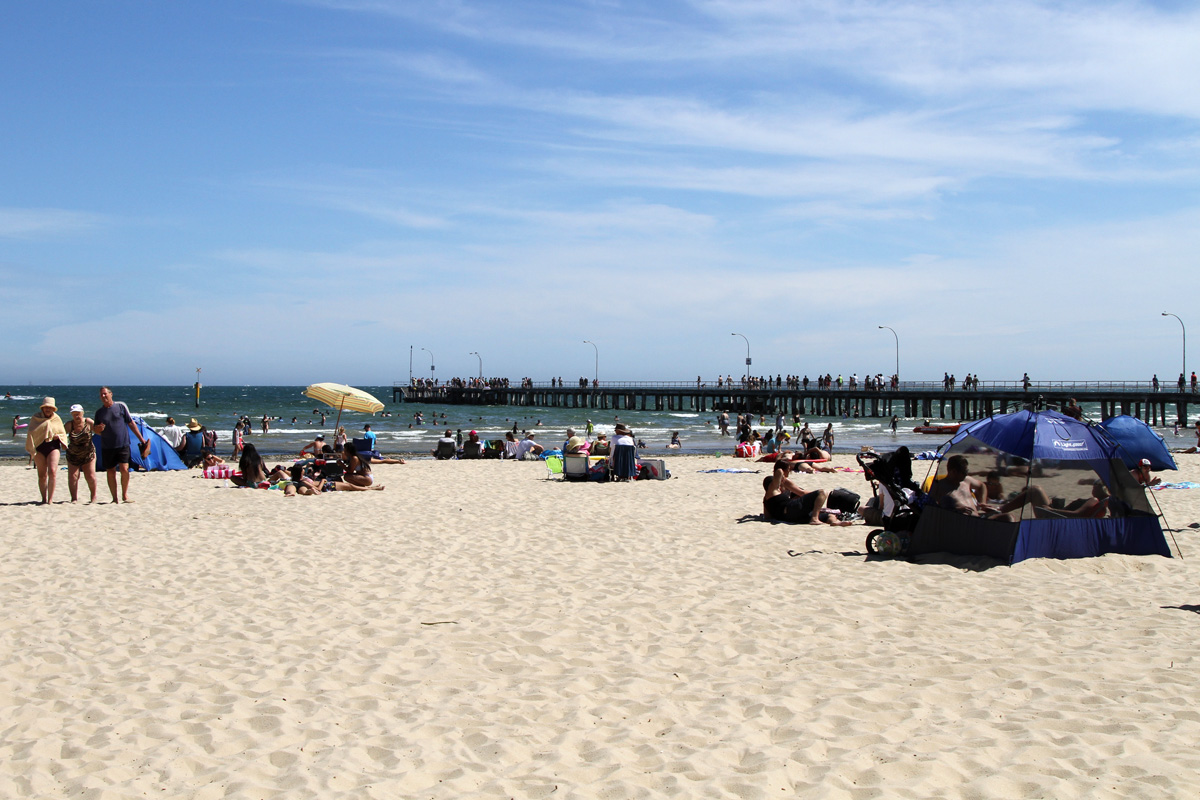
Looking west towards the pier

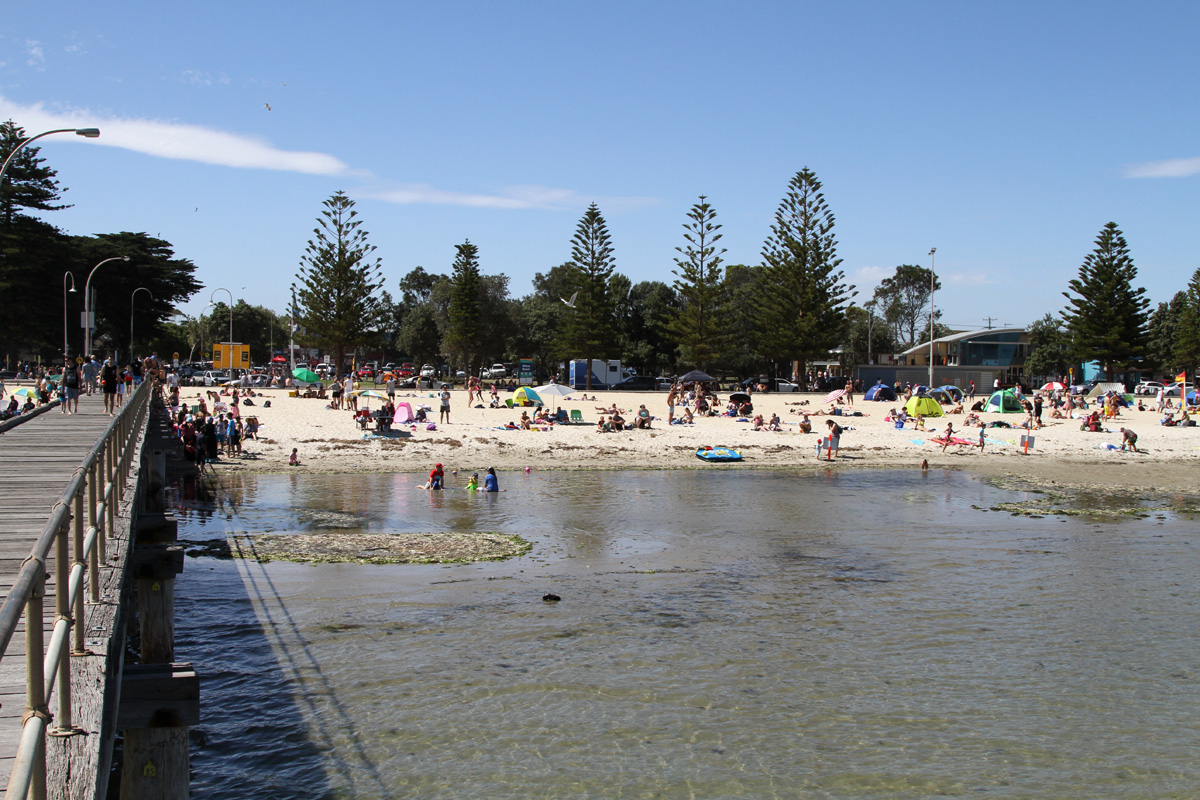
The beach from the pier

Altona Beach is a beach located in Altona, Victoria, Australia. A long pier is located towards the middle of the beach. From late November through to around Easter each year, volunteers from the Altona Lifesaving Club patrol the beach on the eastern side of the pier.

== Heritage pier ==
Altona Pier is a heritage listed pier that was originally constructed c.1888 with later modifications. It is located at the intersection of the Esplanade and Pier Street.

== Recreation ==
The end of Altona Pier, is a common fishing spot for many local anglers who live around the area. The western side of the Pier is a great place for kite surfing and these surfers are in the water throughout the year. Body-boarding and surfing are not common at Altona Beach as for most of the year the water is fairly calm, with small waves only appearing whilst a strong southerly is blowing.

== Altona Dog Beach ==
There are several parks and reserves in Hobsons Bay where dogs are allowed off-leash. The beach is next to the Altona Sports Club, and not far from Seaholme railway station. This is an Off Leash area and many people bring their dogs to the beach at low tide to socialise and romp around. There are also dog shower facilities. Pets must be under effective voice control at all times.

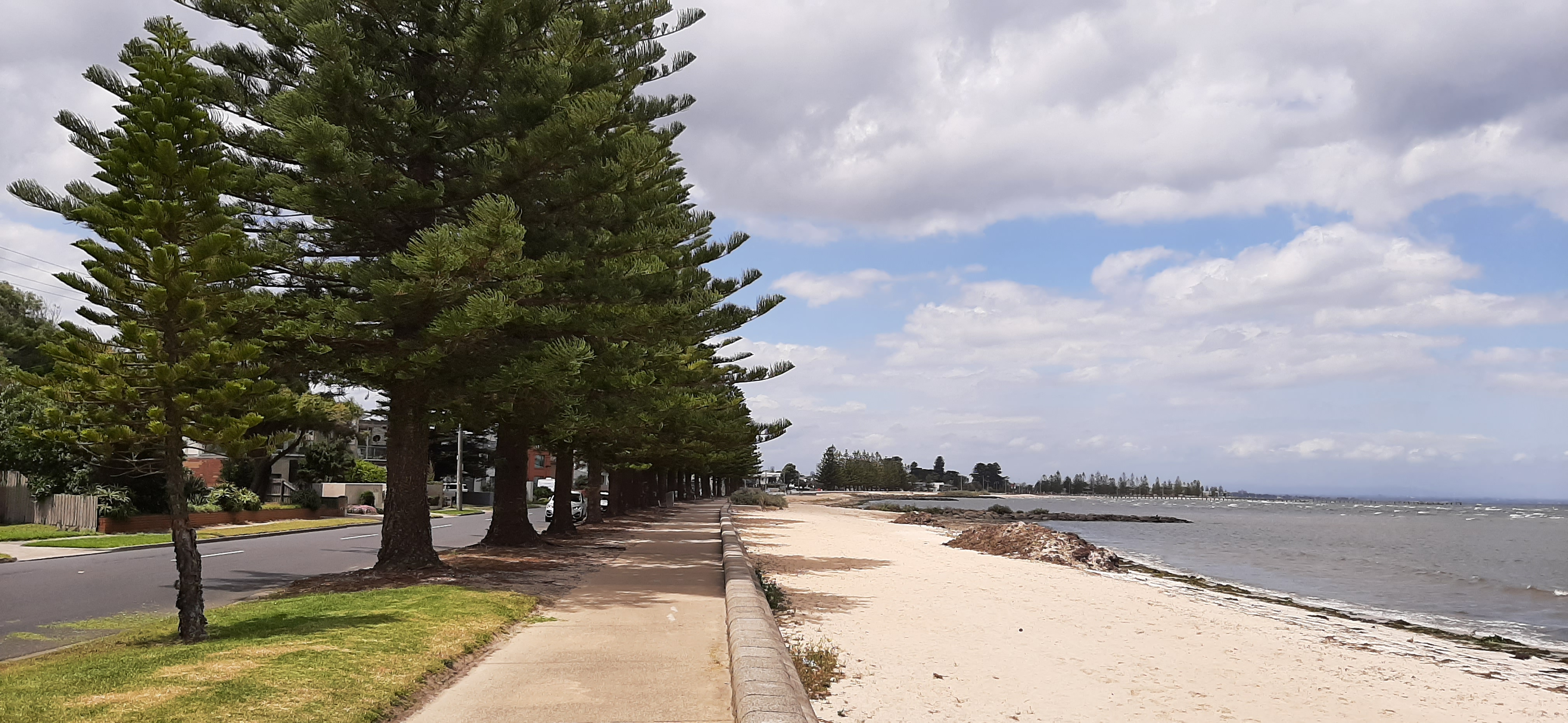
Looking east towards Altona Beach

== Marine life ==
Animals found around the beach include:

- Seagulls
- Jelly blubber
- Snapper
- Gummy shark
- Toadfish
- Stingray
- Weedy seadragon
- Leatherjacket fish
- Black swans

== Environmental issues ==
In March 2022, EPA Victoria warned that the water at the Altona Dog Beach should be avoided due to an major detergent spill that started at a factory fire in Laverton North and travelled via stormwater drains into Cherry Lake and Cherry Creek before reaching the beach, impacting the marine life.
