= Seaholme =

- Suburb
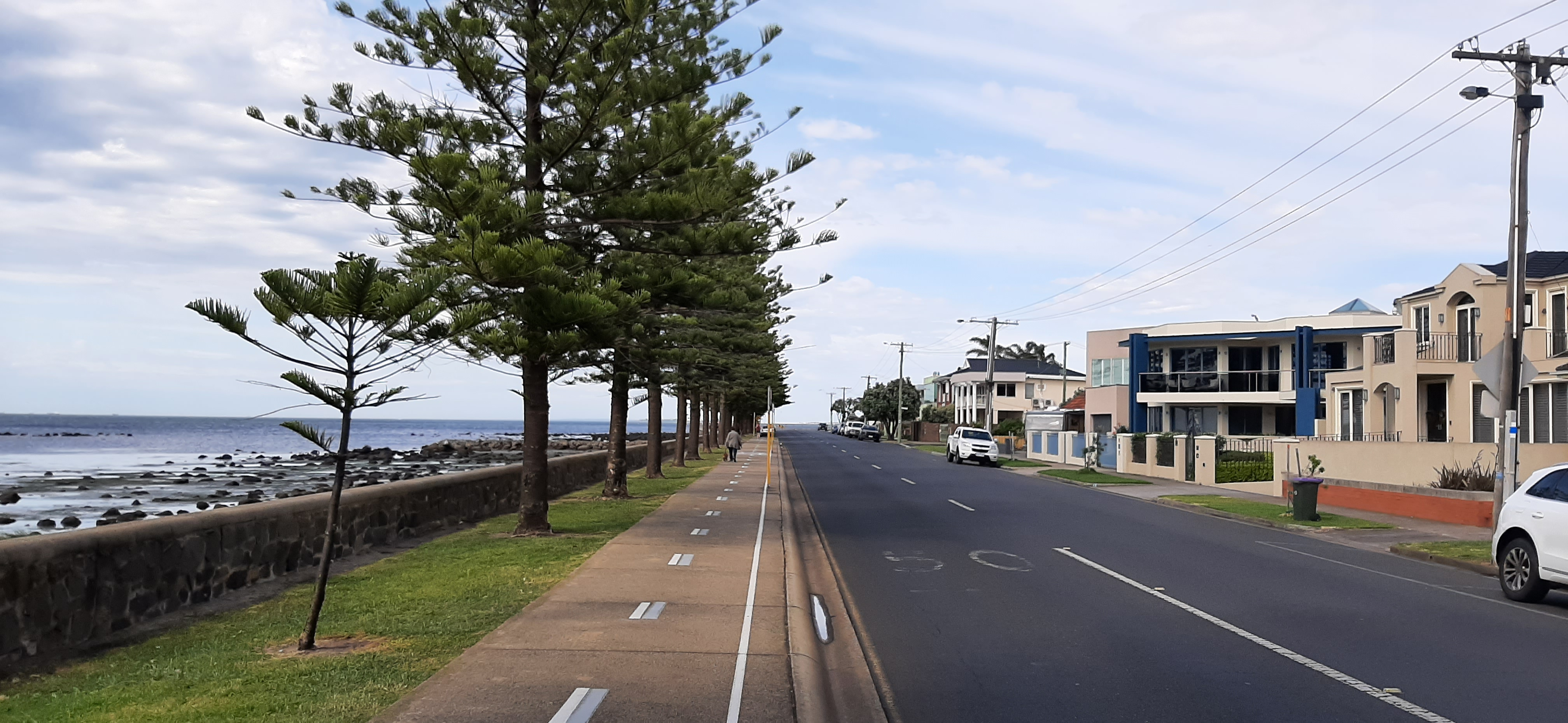
- The Esplanade, Seaholme

- Interactive map of Seaholme
- Coordinates: 37.868°S 144.841°E
- Country: Australia
- State: Victoria
- City: Melbourne
- LGA: City of Hobsons Bay
- Location: 12 km (7.5 mi) from Melbourne

Government
  - State electorate: Williamstown
  - Federal division: Gellibrand

Area
  - Total: 0.9 km^{2} (0.35 sq mi)
- Elevation: 5 m (16 ft)

Population
  - Total: 2,067 (2021 census)
  - Density: 2,300/km^{2} (5,900/sq mi)
- Postcode: 3018
Suburbs around Seaholme
| Altona | Altona | Altona |
| Altona | Seaholme | Port Phillip |
| Port Phillip | Port Phillip | Port Phillip |

Seaholme is a suburb in Melbourne, Victoria, Australia, 12 km (7.5 mi) south-west of Melbourne's Central Business District, located within the City of Hobsons Bay local government area. Seaholme recorded a population of 2,067 at the 2021 census.

Seaholme was the name of a housing estate developed in the early 1920s, which was marketed as the next stage of development of the adjoining suburb of Altona. It is a bayside enclave within Altona, bounded in the west by Millers Road and in the north by the Altona Coastal Park.

Sunset at the Esplanade in Seaholme

Seaholme Post Office opened on 2 July 1951 and closed in 1971.

== Transport ==
=== Train ===
- Seaholme has a railway station, which is served by trains on the Werribee railway line.

=== Bus ===
- Route 411-412: Laverton to Footscray
- Route 903: Altona to Mordialloc (SmartBus Service)

== See also ==
- City of Altona – Seaholme was previously within this former local government area.
