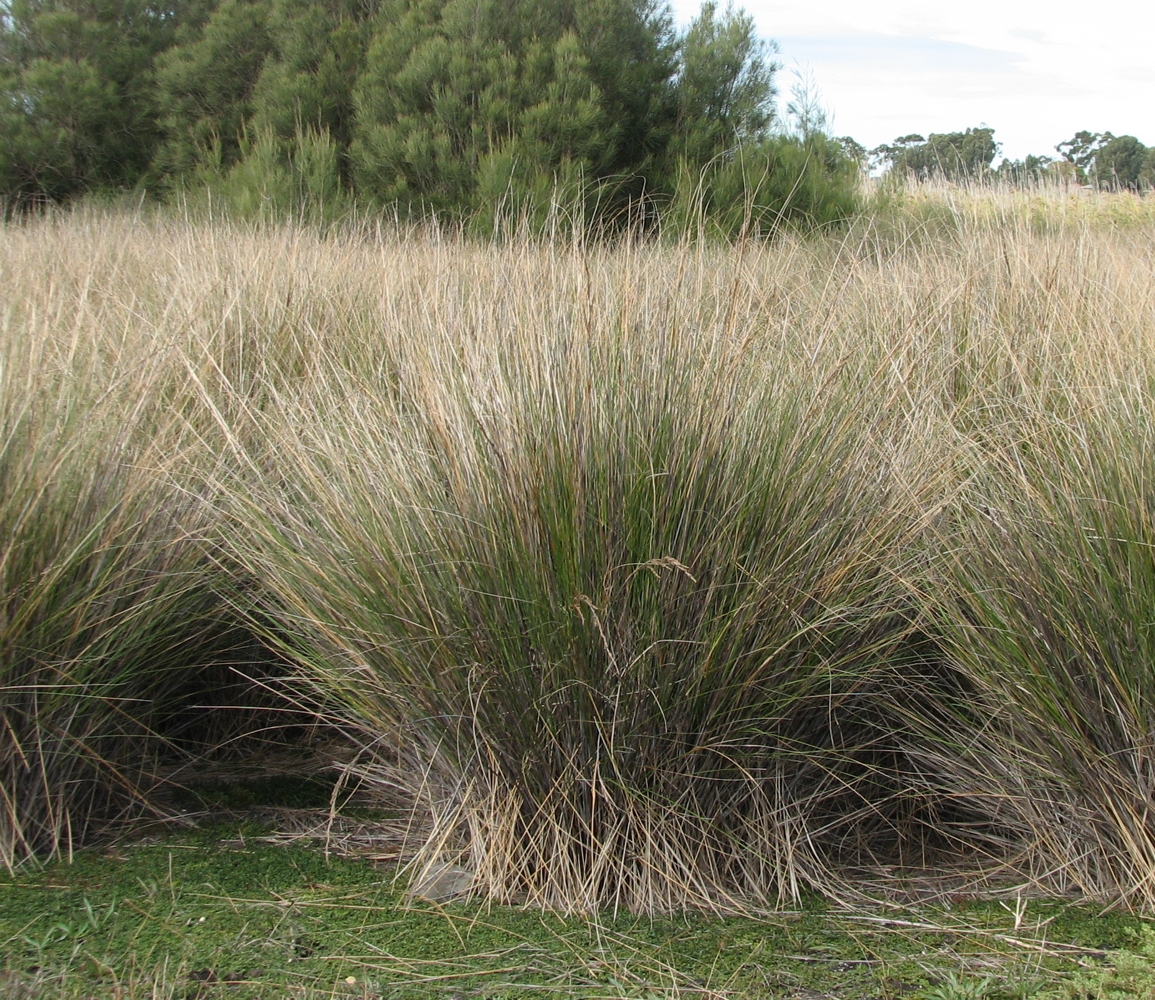
- Gahnia filum at Cherry Lake Altona, Victoria

Scientific classification
- Kingdom: Plantae
- Clade: Tracheophytes
- Clade: Angiosperms
- Clade: Monocots
- Clade: Commelinids
- Order: Poales
- Family: Cyperaceae
- Genus: Gahnia
- Species: G. filum

Binomial name
- Gahnia filum (Labill.) F.Muell.

= Gahnia filum =

Species of plant

Gahnia filum, the chaffy saw-sedge, is a tussock-forming perennial in the family Cyperaceae, endemic to Australia. It grows to between 60 and 110 cm in height.

The species occurs in coastal salt marsh in the states of New South Wales, Victoria, Tasmania and South Australia.

The caterpillar of the yellow sedge-skipper butterfly uses this species for shelter during daylight hours, binding the leaves with silk. By night it feeds on the grass. Ghania is being planted at Aldinga Washpool in South Australia in order to provided habitat for the endangered butterfly.
