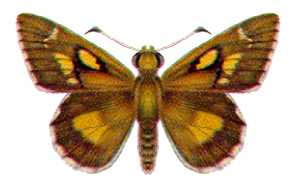

Scientific classification
- Kingdom: Animalia
- Phylum: Arthropoda
- Class: Insecta
- Order: Lepidoptera
- Family: Hesperiidae
- Genus: Hesperilla
- Species: H. flavescens

Binomial name
- Hesperilla flavescens Waterhouse, 1927

Synonyms
- Hesperilla donnysa flavescens Waterhouse, G.A. 1927; Hesperilla donnysa flavia Waterhouse, G.A. 1941

= Hesperilla flavescens =

Species of butterfly

Hesperilla flavescens, also known as the yellow sedge-skipper or yellowish skipper, is a species of butterfly in the family Hesperiidae. It is found in the Australian states of South Australia and Victoria.

The wingspan is about 30 millimetres (1.2 in).

The larvae feed on Gahnia filum.

The butterfly is endangered in South Australia, and volunteers have planted gahnia at Aldinga Washpool to provide habitat for the species.

== Subspecies ==
- Hesperilla flavescens flavescens Altona skipper butterfly (near Altona and Ararat, in Victoria)
- Hesperilla flavescens flavia (near Adelaide in South Australia)
