= Altona, Victoria =

Altona
- Suburb
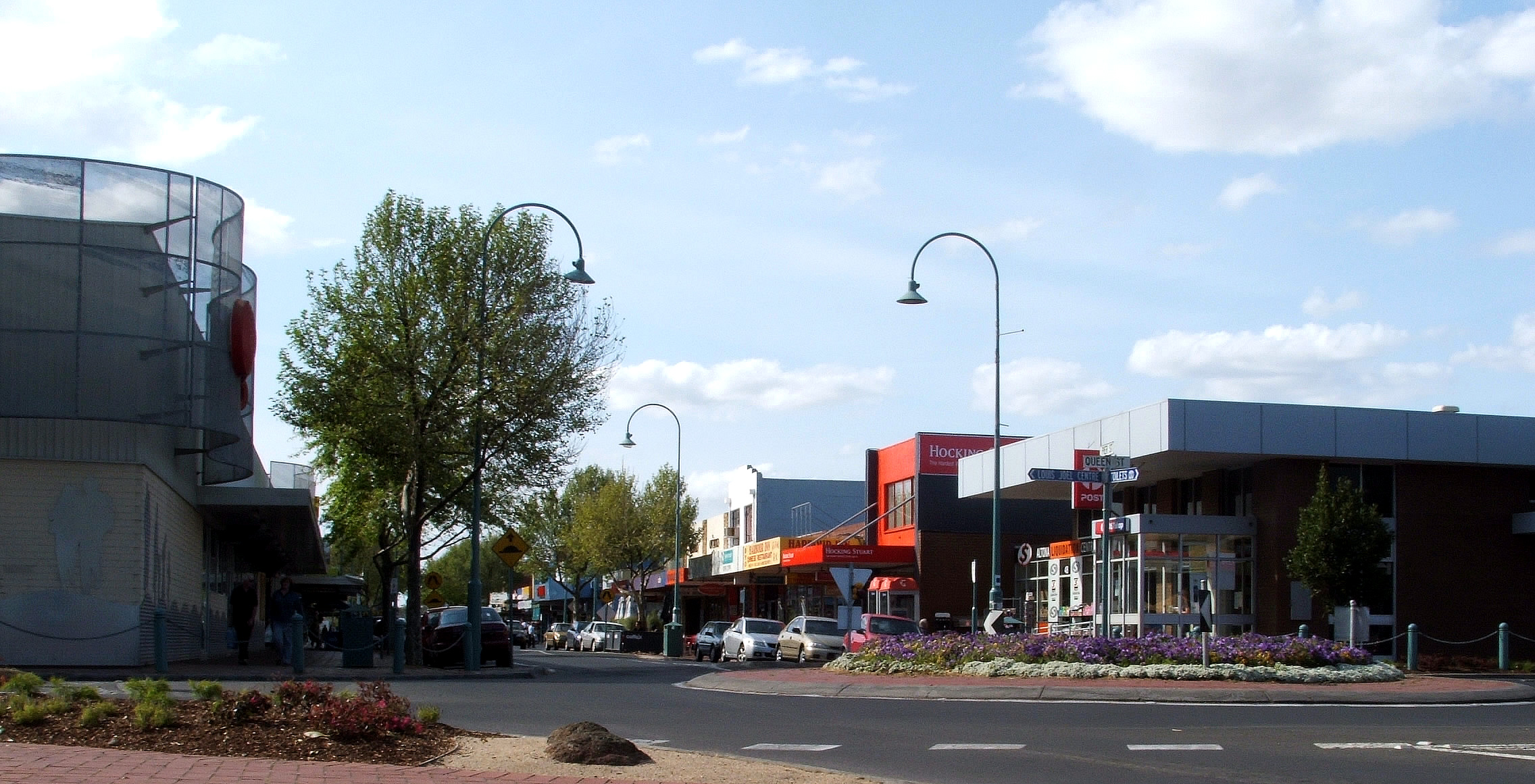
- Main street of Altona

- Interactive map of Altona
- Coordinates: 37.868°S 144.830°E
- Country: Australia
- State: Victoria
- City: Melbourne
- LGA: City of Hobsons Bay
- Location: 13 km (8.1 mi) from Melbourne

Government
  - State electorate: Williamstown
  - Federal division: Gellibrand

Area
  - Total: 16.9 km^{2} (6.5 sq mi)
- Elevation: 8 m (26 ft)

Population
  - Total: 11,490 (2021 census)
  - Density: 679.9/km^{2} (1,761/sq mi)
- Postcode: 3018
Suburbs around Altona
Laverton North	Altona North	Newport
Altona Meadows	Altona	Seaholme and Williamstown
Altona Meadows	Port Phillip	Port Phillip

Altona is a suburb in Melbourne, Victoria, Australia, 13 km (8.1 mi) south-west of Melbourne's Central Business District, located within the City of Hobsons Bay local government area. Altona recorded a population of 11,490 at the 2021 census.

Altona is a large suburb consisting of low density residential in the south-eastern half and mixed industry in the north-western half. A feature of the suburb is Altona Beach, which is one of only two swimming beaches in the western suburbs (the other being Williamstown Beach).

Altona takes its name from the then-independent German city of Altona which is today a borough of Hamburg.

== History ==
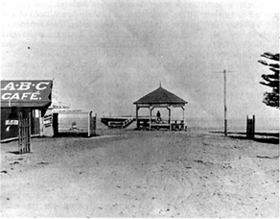
Intersection of Pier Street and the Esplanade in the late 1920s

Prior to arrival of Europeans, the Altona area was home to Yalukit-Willam Aboriginal people, of the Woiwurrung clan.

Altona was first permanently settled in 1842, with the construction of The Homestead by Alfred Langhorne. The name 'Altona' first appeared on maps in 1861. It was named by Frederick Taegtow, a German who hailed from Altona, then a town just outside of Hamburg. Taegtow believed that coal was to be found in the area, and in 1881 he formed the Williamstown (Taegtow) Prospecting Company. From 1886, housing in the Altona and Merton Street estates was sold, and by 1901 the Victorian Government owned an explosives reserve in the west of Altona.

On 20 February 1911, J. J. Hammond flew the first cross country flight between towns in Australia from Altona Bay to Geelong in Victoria, and on 23 February, also at Altona Bay, he undertook the first powered passenger flight in Australia.

Coal mining formed the basis of the local economy from 1908 to 1919. However, this was brought to an end in 1930 when open cut mining was developed in the Latrobe Valley.

By 1918, the population was sufficient to justify a Post Office which opened on 14 January 1918.

Following the Second World War, Altona received a large influx of immigrants, primarily from the Mediterranean, Central Europe and a smaller number from the Middle East.

From 1862, Altona was a town in the Shire of Werribee, but in 1957, the Altona Riding of the Shire, which included Altona itself as well as Altona North and Altona Meadows, was severed, and became the City of Altona in 1968. This was merged into the City of Hobsons Bay in June 1994 under local government amalgamations undertaken by the Kennett government.

== Politics ==
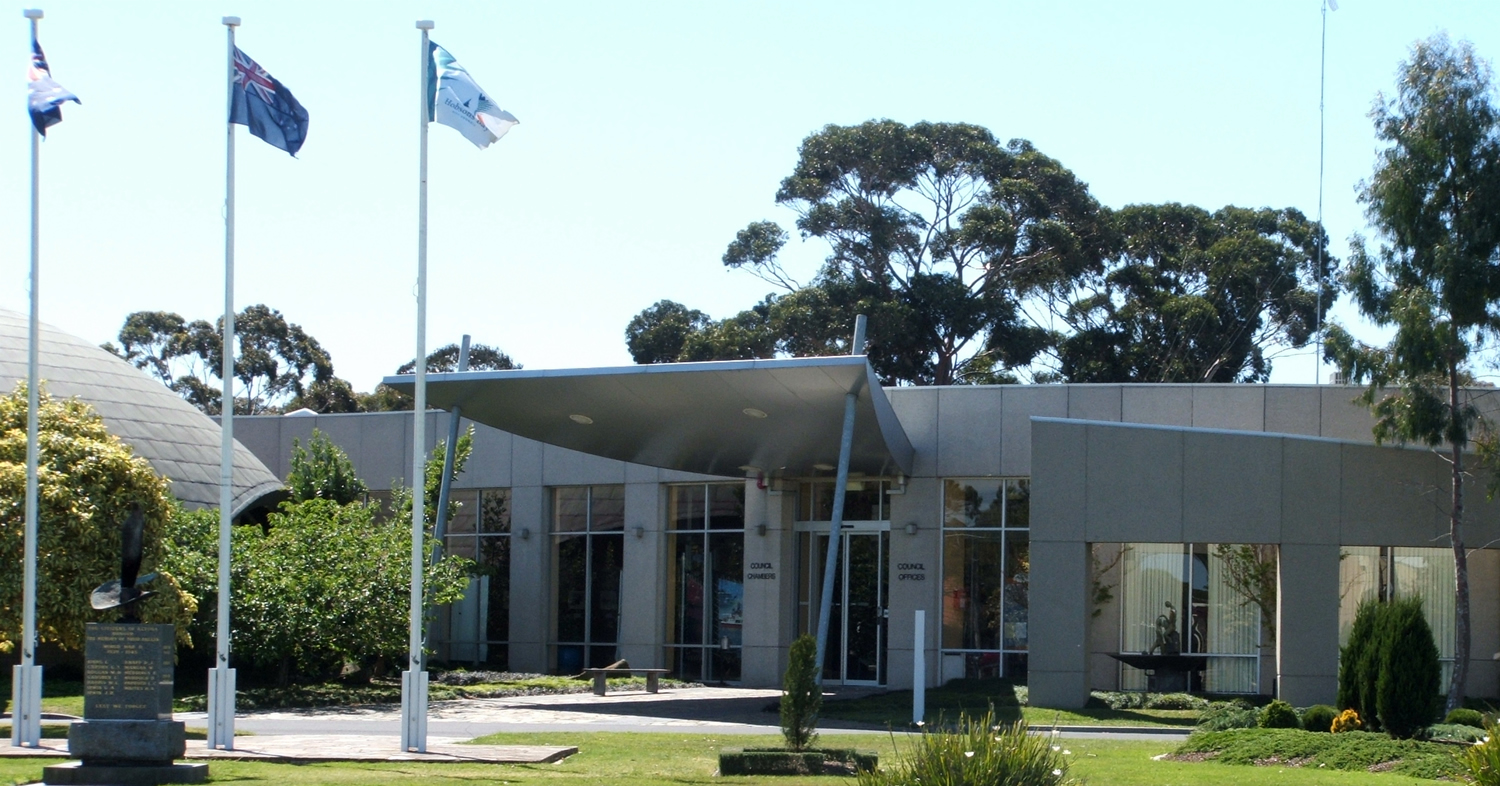
Hobsons Bay council chambers in Altona

On 24 June 2010, Altona became home to Australia's first female prime minister, Julia Gillard, a then resident of Altona. Gillard was voted in by the governing Australian Labor Party to replace Kevin Rudd as its leader, making her Australia's 27th Prime Minister.

== Population ==
According to the 2021 census, there were 11,490 people in Altona, with 67.3% of Altona residents born in Australia. The next most common countries of birth were England 4.8%, New Zealand 2.5%, Malta 1.8%, India 1.4% and China 1.2%. 75.8% of residents only spoke English at home. Other languages spoken at home included Maltese 1.6%, Italian 1.6%, Greek 1.4%, Mandarin 1.4% and Vietnamese 1.1%. The most common responses for religion in were No Religion 42.3%, Catholic 28.1% and Anglican 6.6%.

== Parks and gardens ==
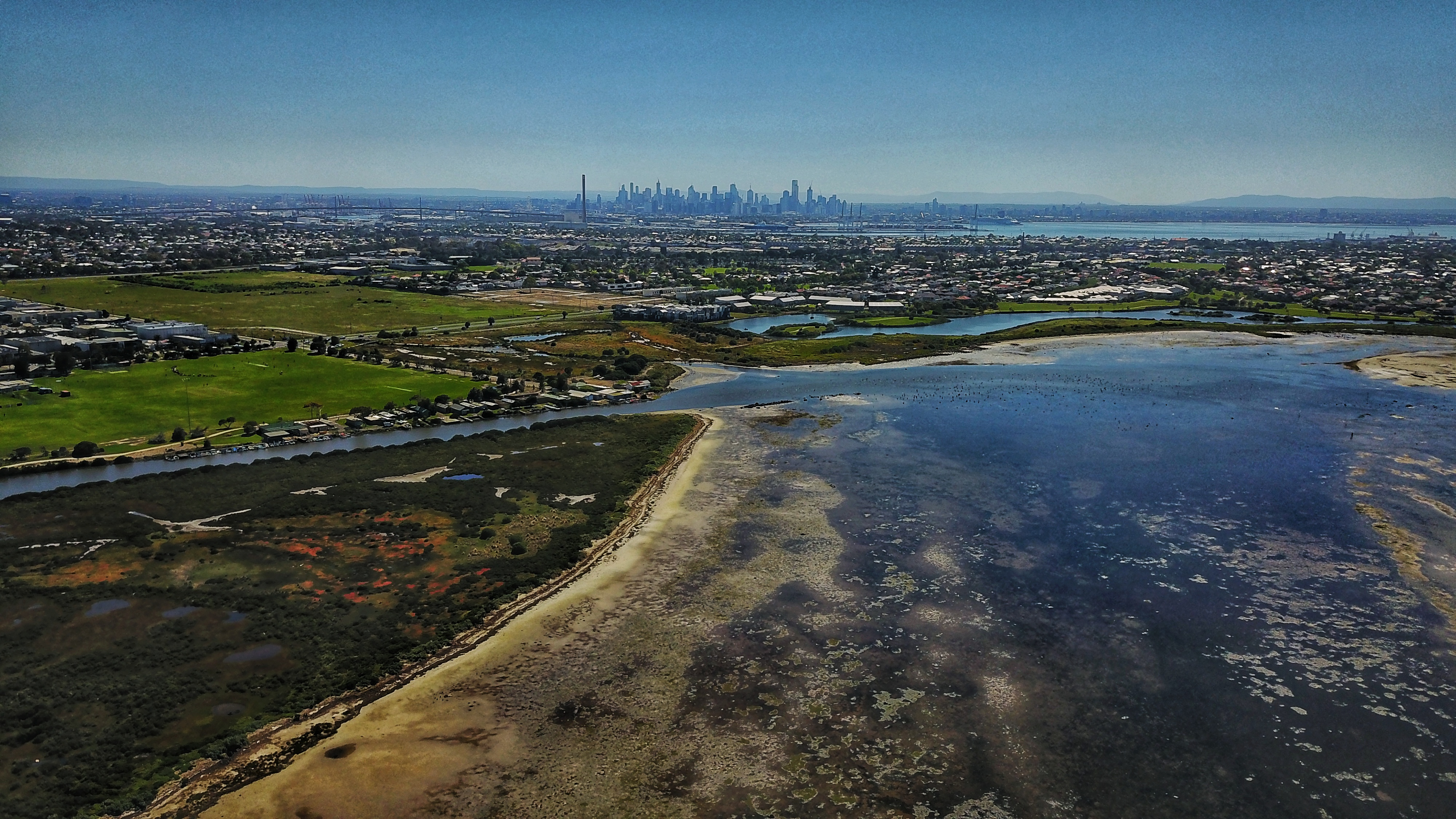
Aerial vista of the Melbourne CBD from Altona Coastal Park in 2018.

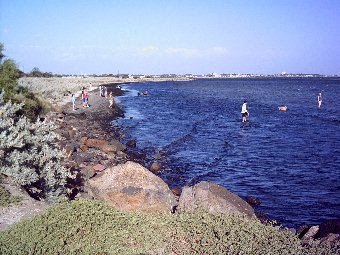
P.A. Burns Reserve and Altona Coastal Park shoreline

Altona has many significant parks and gardens, including some important environmental conservation areas and wetlands along the shores of Port Phillip. These are also used by visitors and residents recreationally and include a long promenade along the bay. Notable areas include:

- Kororoit Creek
- Cherry Lake
- Altona Coastal Park
- Truganina Coastal Parklands

== Education ==
Altona has four primary schools consisting of Altona Primary School, Seaholme Primary School, Altona College (a merger between the former Altona Secondary College and Altona West Primary School) and St. Mary's Catholic Primary School. The secondary schools include Mount St. Joseph Girls' College and Altona College (Altona Secondary College changed its name in 2007 to Altona P-9 College, then in 2019 included years 10-12).

Altona has a library branch, which contains the Environmental Resources Centre. This centre provides the community with access to media related to environmental initiatives in Hobsons Bay, including Industry Environment Improvement Plans from local industry.

== Culture ==
The Altona Beach Festival is a free event held annually at the Logan Reserve precinct, (located on the Esplanade and includes the Logan Reserve parklands, part of Pier Street and the Esplanade), to promote and celebrate Hobsons Bay and the western suburbs. The festival includes a twilight street parade, beach market, double-decker bus tour, professional entertainers, RAAF fly-overs and fireworks off the Altona Pier.

The Altona Beach Festival was previously known as the Bayside Festival and also Operation Recreation, and some residents still refer to it by one of these names. The 30th anniversary of the festival was held in 2007. It enjoyed a brief period of heightened prominence in 2002 when it was featured on the Channel 9 travel program Postcards in a segment hosted by Geoff Cox. Scouts Australia is a major feature of the parade and the many community activities that take place close to the beach front.

The Altona City Theatre is a production company based in the Altona Civic Theatre, producing two major musicals and a smaller pantomime annually. The pantomime coincides with the Bayside Festival and was originally intended as an outlet for young directors.

Scouts Australia has two groups in Altona. The 1st Altona Scout Group runs from the Scout Hall. The 4th Altona Scout Group are located at the Pines, an old camp owned by the City of Hobsons Bay.

== Sport ==
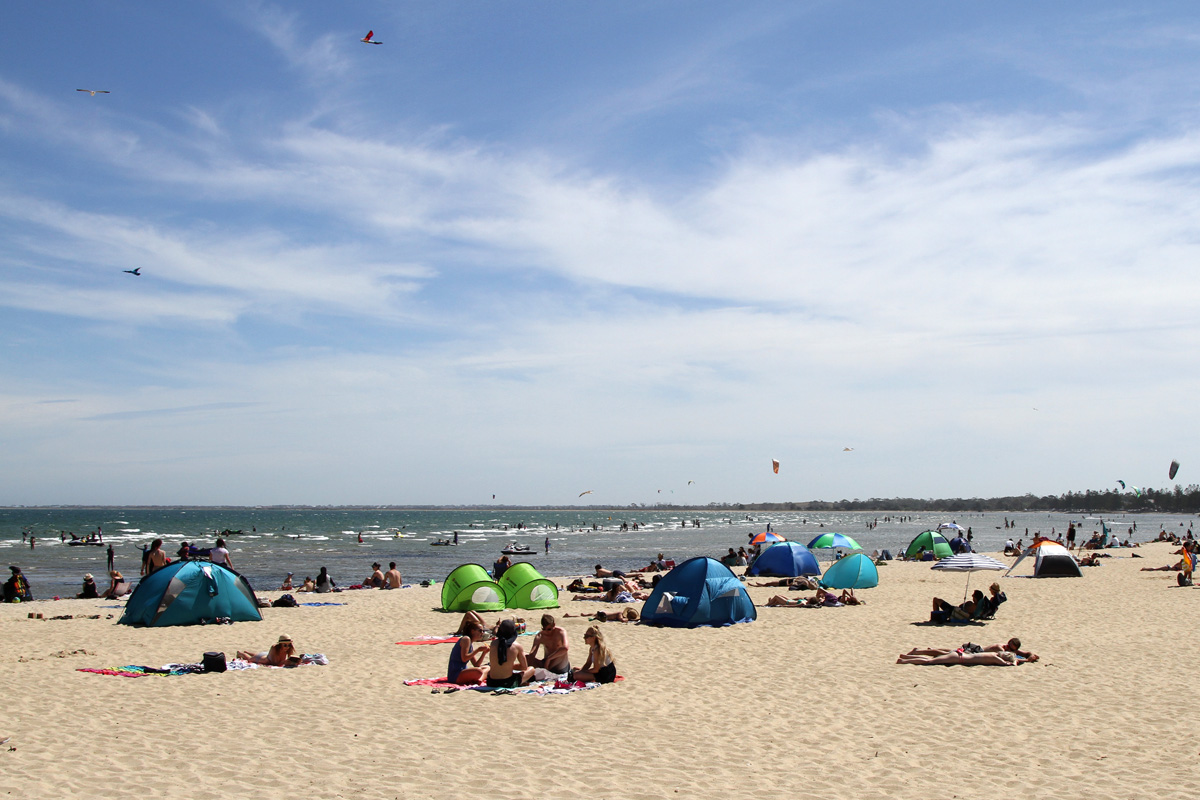
Recreation on Altona Beach, including sunbathing, kite flying, kitesurfing, swimming, and jetskiing

Altona is home to many sporting clubs including Australian rules football, soccer, hockey, basketball, cricket and lacrosse. Melbourne Ballpark is a baseball complex in the west of Altona.

Altona is represented by many sporting teams, including the Altona Magic soccer team which competes in the Victorian State League Division 1, the third tier in Australia behind the A-League and the Victorian Premier League. Altona City SC plays in Victorian State League Division 2 N/W.

Altona has an Australian Rules football team competing in the Western Region Football League.

The Altona Roosters complete in the Victorian Rugby League, and play home games at Loft Reserve, in neighbouring Newport.

Golfers play at the course of the Kooringal Golf Club on Wilga Avenue.

The area of Altona beach directly west of Altona Pier is one of Melbourne's most popular spots for kitesurfing.

== Transport ==
=== Trains ===
Altona has two railway stations; Altona and Westona, both of which are on the Altona Loop. This is one of the two lines that runs between Newport and Laverton stations (the other being a Newport direct Express to Laverton track that operates along the former Geelong railway line, located along the northern boundary of Altona). Early morning and late night services to Werribee, as well as all weekend services, run via the Altona loop. At other times, the Altona loop is serviced by Laverton services.

=== Bus ===
- Route 411: Laverton station to Footscray (via Altona Meadows and Altona)
- Route 412: Laverton station to Footscray (via Altona Meadows and Altona)
- Route 415: Laverton station to Williamstown (via Altona)
- Route 903: Altona to Mordialloc (SMARTBUS Service)
- Route 944: City to Point Cook (Night Bus Service)

=== Other ===
The Hobsons Bay Coastal Trail, a shared path for cyclists and pedestrians, follows the coast through Altona. It links up with a path around Cherry Lake. Most major roads have on-road cycleways.

== Industry ==
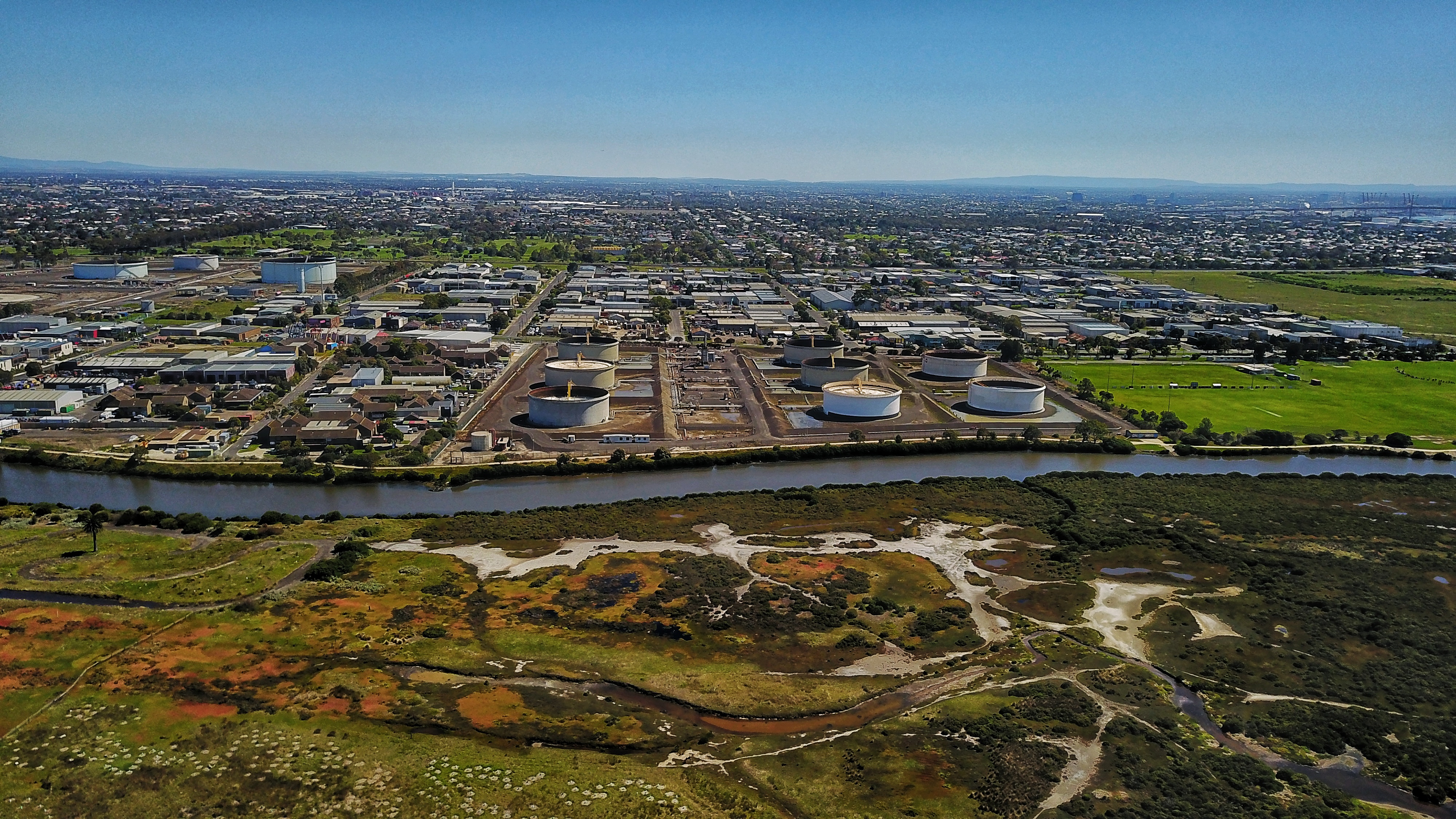
Aerial perspective of the Mobil refinery and its surrounds in Altona. 2018

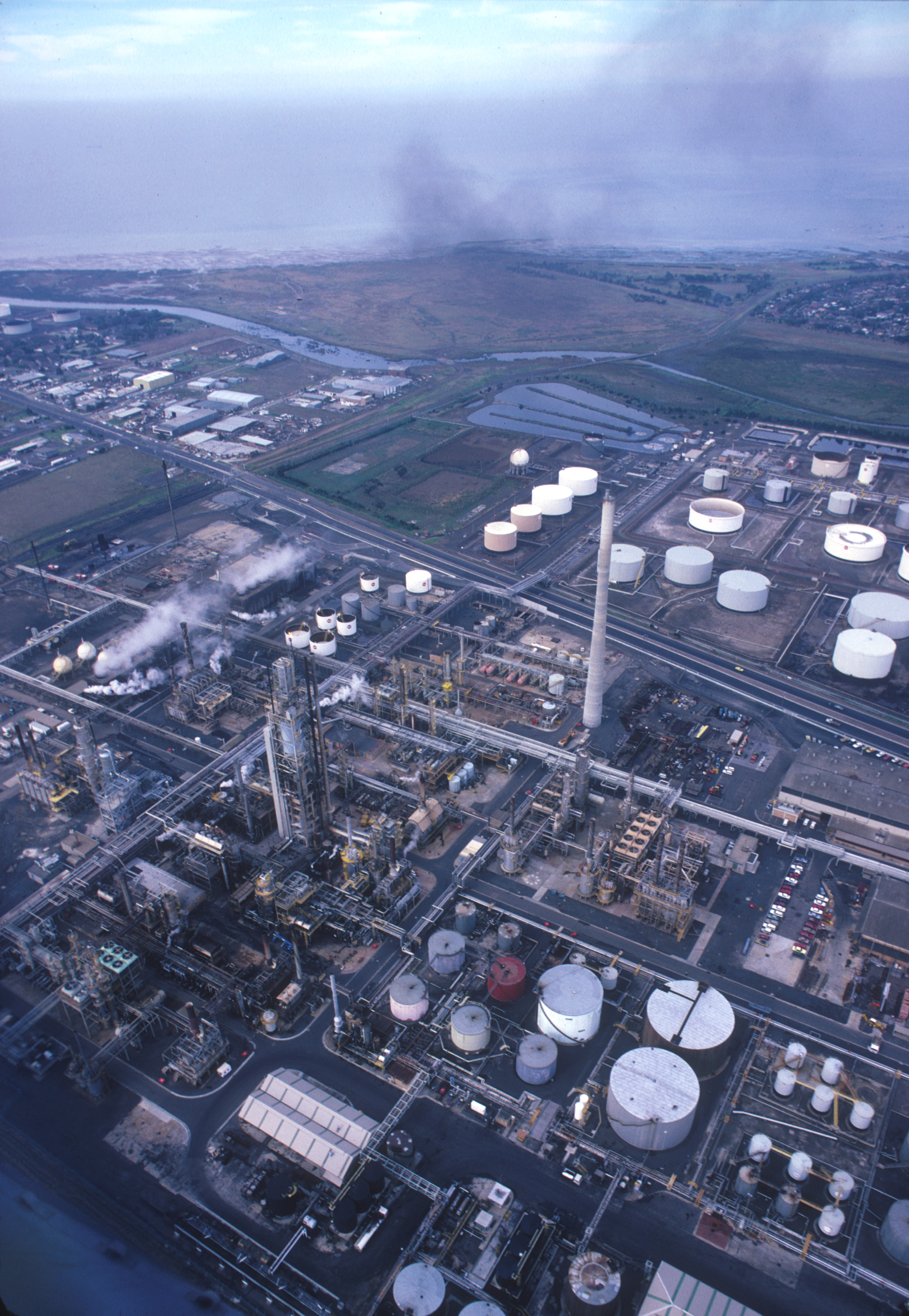
The Altona Petrochemical Complex in 2003

Local industry includes petrochemical storage, manufacturing and distribution. The Altona Petrochemical Complex was established in the early 1960s, utilising feedstocks from the nearby Altona Refinery, and later the Bass Strait gas fields, to produce a wide range of products for the chemical and plastics industry. The complex grew to become the largest petrochemical installation in the southern hemisphere and included major global chemical companies such as Dow Chemicals, Union Carbide, Hoechst, BF Goodrich and BASF. This was a major environmental concern to residents in the 1970s and 1980s. Strict environmental controls and local projects involving industry, government and environmental groups have reduced these concerns, cleaning up coastal areas that were once neglected.

== Notable people ==
Julia Gillard was an Altona resident while serving as Australia's 27th Prime Minister.

Former Australian Greens senator Janet Rice was born in Altona in 1960.

Adrian Tantari, Queensland politician, and Lauren Edwards, British Labour Party MP for Rochester and Strood, were born in Altona.

== See also ==
- City of Altona – Altona was previously within this former local government area.
- Altona Beach
- Altona Meadows
- Altona North
- Seaholme
