= Williamstown, Victoria =

Williamstown
- Suburb
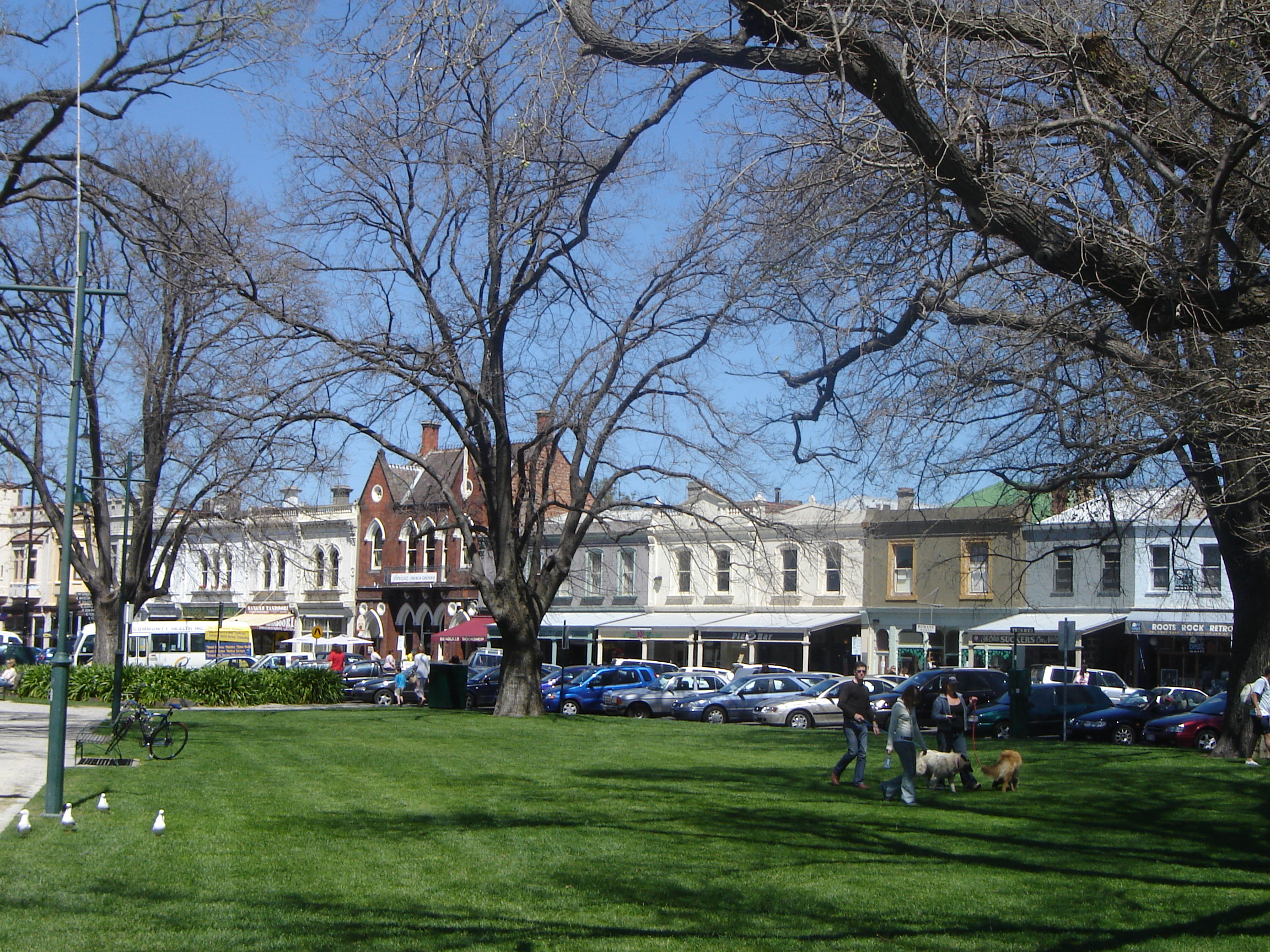
- Nelson Place, in the restaurant precinct, 2005

- Interactive map of Williamstown
- Coordinates: 37.861°S 144.885°E
- Country: Australia
- State: Victoria
- City: Melbourne
- LGA: City of Hobsons Bay
- Location: 11 km (6.8 mi) from Melbourne CBD

Government
  - State electorate: Williamstown
  - Federal division: Gellibrand

Area
  - Total: 5.5 km^{2} (2.1 sq mi)
- Elevation: 12 m (39 ft)

Population
  - Total: 14,407 (2021 census)
  - Density: 2,619/km^{2} (6,780/sq mi)
- Postcode: 3016
Suburbs around Williamstown
Williamstown North	Newport	Port Melbourne
Altona	Williamstown	Port Phillip
Port Phillip	Port Phillip	Port Phillip

Williamstown is a suburb in Melbourne, Victoria, Australia, 11 km (6.8 mi) south-west of Melbourne's Central Business District, located within the City of Hobsons Bay local government area. Williamstown recorded a population of 14,407 at the 2021 census.

== History ==
=== Indigenous history ===
Indigenous Australians occupied the area long before maritime activities shaped the modern historical development of Williamstown. The Yalukit-willam clan of the Kulin nation were the first people to call Hobsons Bay home. They roamed the thin coastal strip from Werribee to Williamstown/Hobsons Bay.

The Yalukit-willam were one clan in a language group known as the Bunurong, which included six clans along the coast from the Werribee River, across the Mornington Peninsula, Western Port Bay to Wilsons Promontory.

The Yalukit-willam referred to the Williamstown area as "koort-boork-boork", a term meaning "clump of she-oaks", literally "She-oak, She-oak, many."

=== Colonial exploration and settlement ===
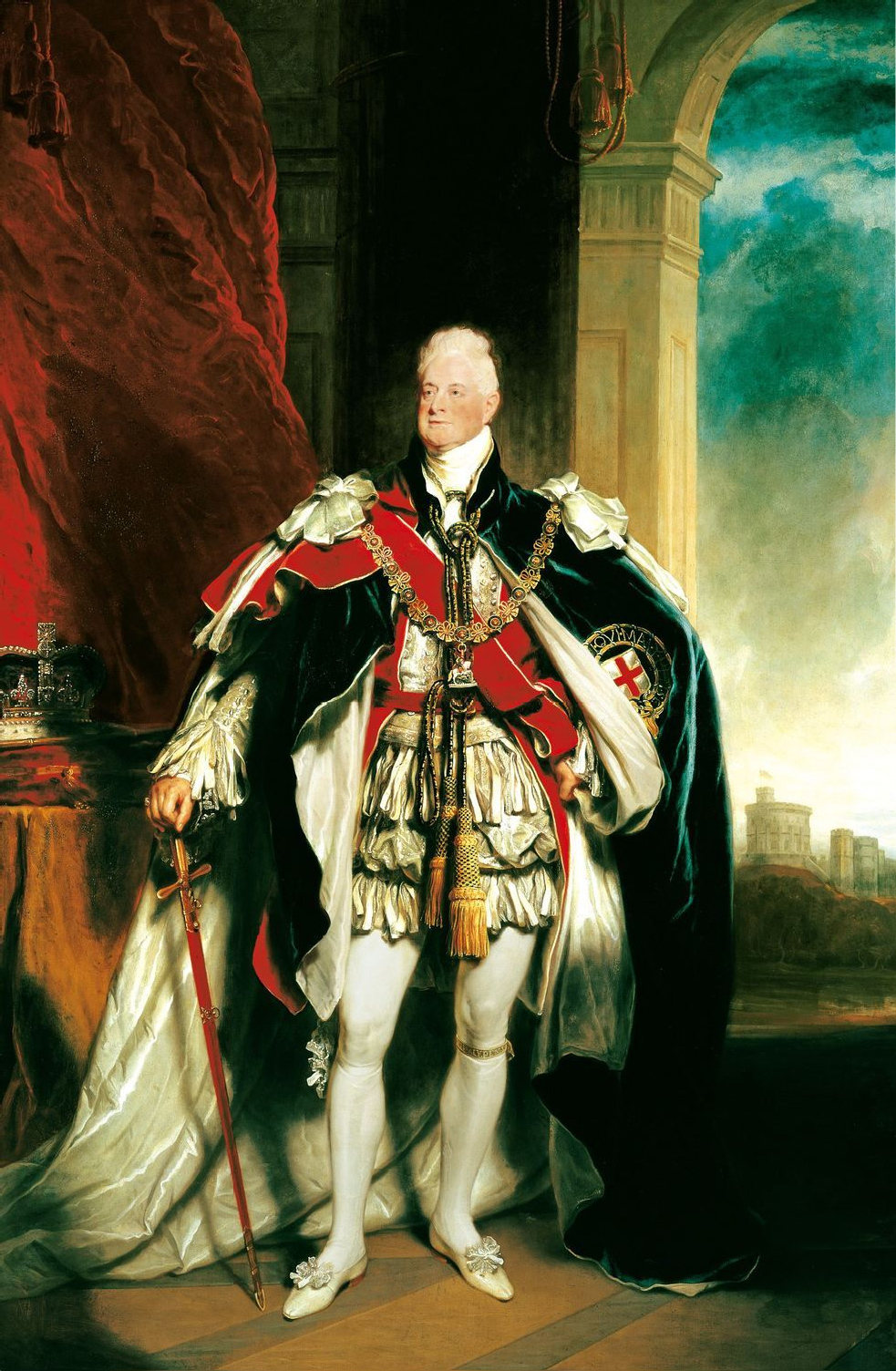
Williamstown was named in honour of William IV

In November 1835, Captain Robson Coltish, master of the barque Norval sailed from Launceston, then crossing Bass Strait with a cargo of 500 sheep and 50 Hereford cattle which had been consigned by Dr. Alexander Thomson. After reaching the coastline of Port Phillip, Captain Coltish chose the area now known as Port Gellibrand, as a suitable place to unload his cargo.

When Governor Richard Bourke and Captain William Lonsdale visited the emergent settlement at Port Phillip in 1837, they both felt the main site of settlement at Point Gellibrand would emerge at the estuary and they renamed it William's Town after King William IV, then the English monarch. It served as the Settlement of Port Phillip's first anchorage and as the centre for port facilities until the late 19th century.

Williamstown was initially considered along with the sites that became known as Geelong and Melbourne for the capital of the new colony at Port Phillip. Although Williamstown offered excellent proximity to anchorage, Melbourne was ultimately chosen due to its abundance of fresh water. Williamstown remained an important port of the new colony, and the first streets of old William's Town were laid out in 1837 with that in mind.

The first land sales in the area took place in 1837. A 30-metre stone jetty was built by convict labour in 1838 where Gem Pier now stands. That same year a ferry service between Melbourne and Williamstown was established aboard the steamer Fire Fly. It was used to convey passengers, as well as sheep and cattle from Tasmania.

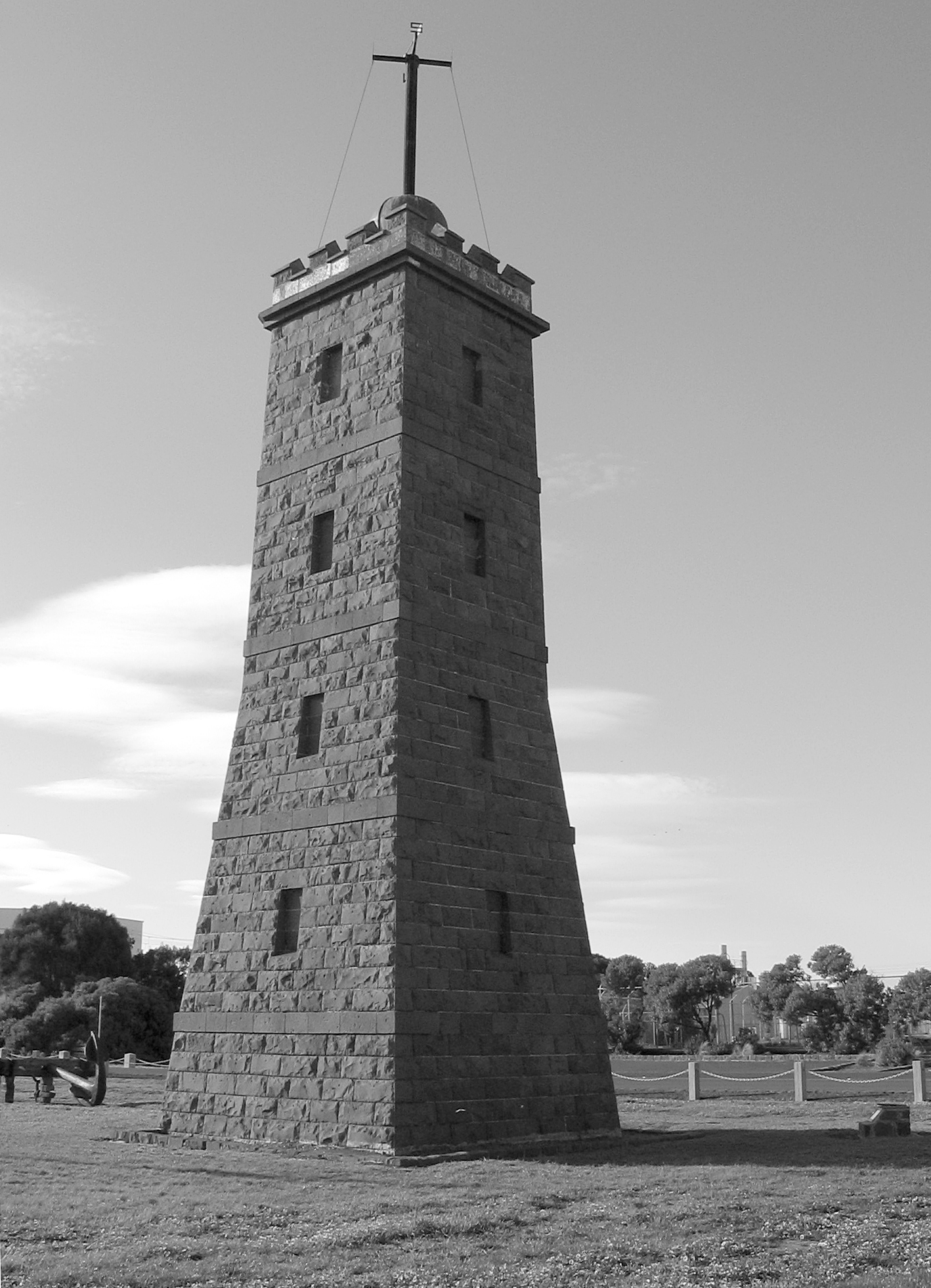
The lighthouse (later the time ball tower) was built in 1849–50.

The first lighthouse, a wooden one with an oil-burning beacon at the top, was erected at Point Gellibrand in 1840. In that same year a water police superintendent was appointed to Williamstown. Williamstown remains the present-day home of the Victorian Water Police.

A bluestone lighthouse was built in 1849–50 to replace the original wooden one. It only operated as a lighthouse until 1860, when a Pile Light was built and anchored off Shelly Beach, after which it served as a time ball tower.

=== Victorian gold rush and wheat boom ===
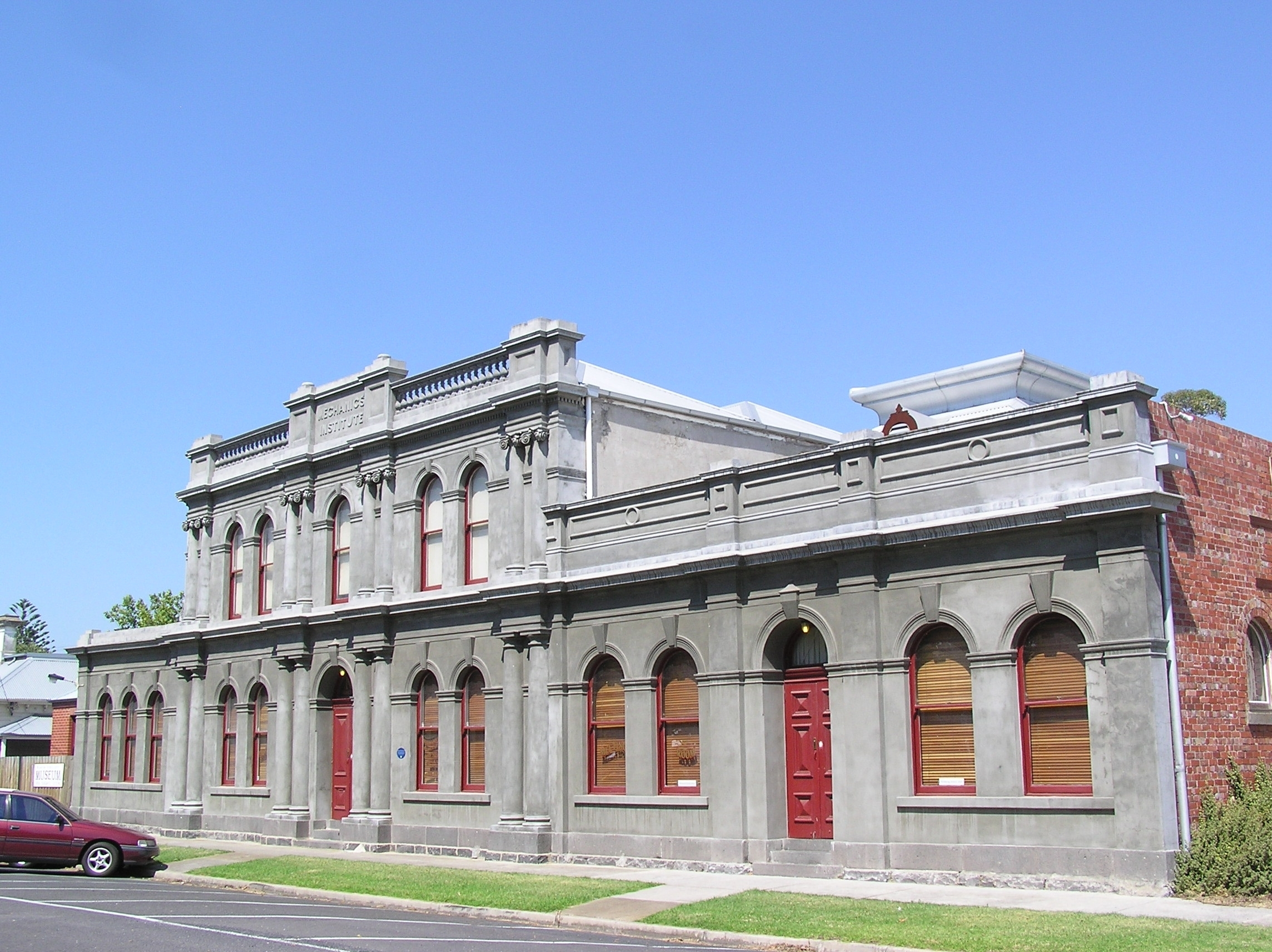
Williamstown – Mechanics' Institute (built in 1860), 2008

Williamstown had been a primitive settlement until the Victorian gold rush of the 1850s, but after the gold seekers began to arrive, many from the tin mines of Cornwall, and many more from the Californian gold fields, the settlement's growth was phenomenal. The first Williamstown Post Office opened on 1 March 1850.

Australia's first telegraph line began operating between Melbourne and Williamstown on 3 March 1854. At that time, the timeball was moved to the Telegraph Station at Point Gellibrand. The Williamstown Chronicle, the first Victorian suburban newspaper, was established in 1854. The Williamstown Freemasons chapter was also established in 1854.

Fort Gellibrand was built in 1855 during the Crimean War, to guard against a possible Russian invasion.

The first lightship to mark the reef off Point Gellibrand was the former barque New Constitution which the Government purchased in October 1856 for £1050. It took up station on 25 July 1859. In May 1860, tenders were called for construction of a new lightship off Point Gellibrand. The new lightship consisted of two white lights of equal height, 24 feet (7.3 m) apart, and was shown from a temporary anchor in 4.5 fathoms of water. This lightship guarded Gellibrand's Point reef from 1861 until 1895.

A Mechanics Institute was opened in 1860, as well as the Williamstown post office, which is the oldest post office building still standing in Victoria. By 1861 Williamstown had 13 slips for boat repairs and building, and pier accommodation for 40 vessels. In 1864, the town boundaries of Williamstown were expanded to take in Newport and Spottiswoode, later to become Spotswood. Piped water from Yan Yean water supply subsequently arrived, allowing more rapid growth.

The Williamstown Racing Club, founded in 1864, was once one of the senior thoroughbred racing clubs in Victoria. Built in 1872, the Williamstown Racecourse, with its large and elaborately decorated grandstand facing out to the sea, was considered one of the finest in Australia. The Williamstown Football Club, an Australian rules football club was formed in 1864.

=== CSS Shenandoah incident of 1865 ===
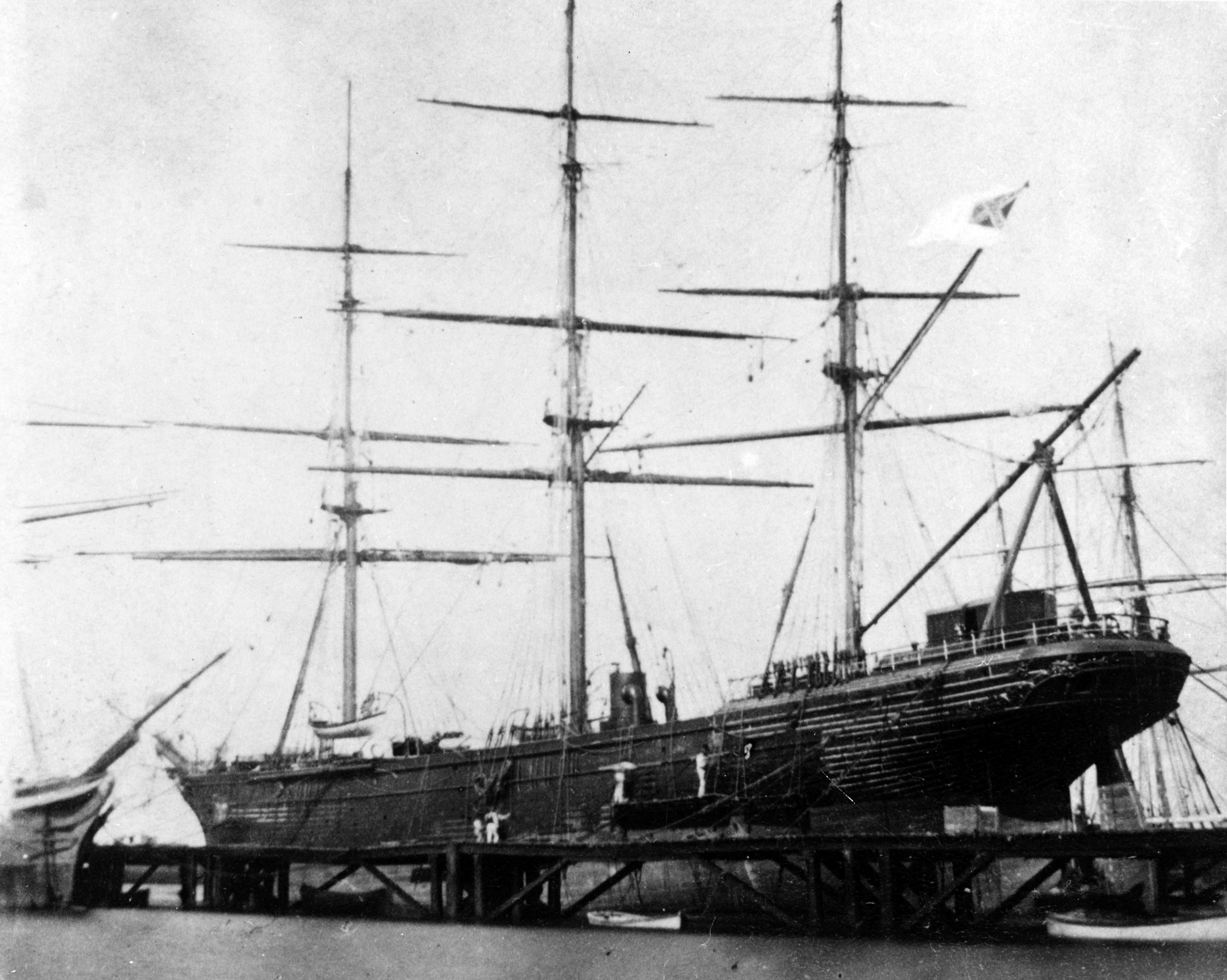
CSS Shenandoah under repair in Williamstown, 1865

The Confederate States Navy warship CSS Shenandoah, which had successfully attacked several Union ships in the Indian Ocean, sailed into Hobsons Bay on the afternoon of 25 January 1865.

An 1871 hearing at the International Court in Geneva awarded damages of £820,000 against Britain to the US government for use of the port at Williamstown by the CSS Shenandoah.

=== Victoria's major cargo port ===
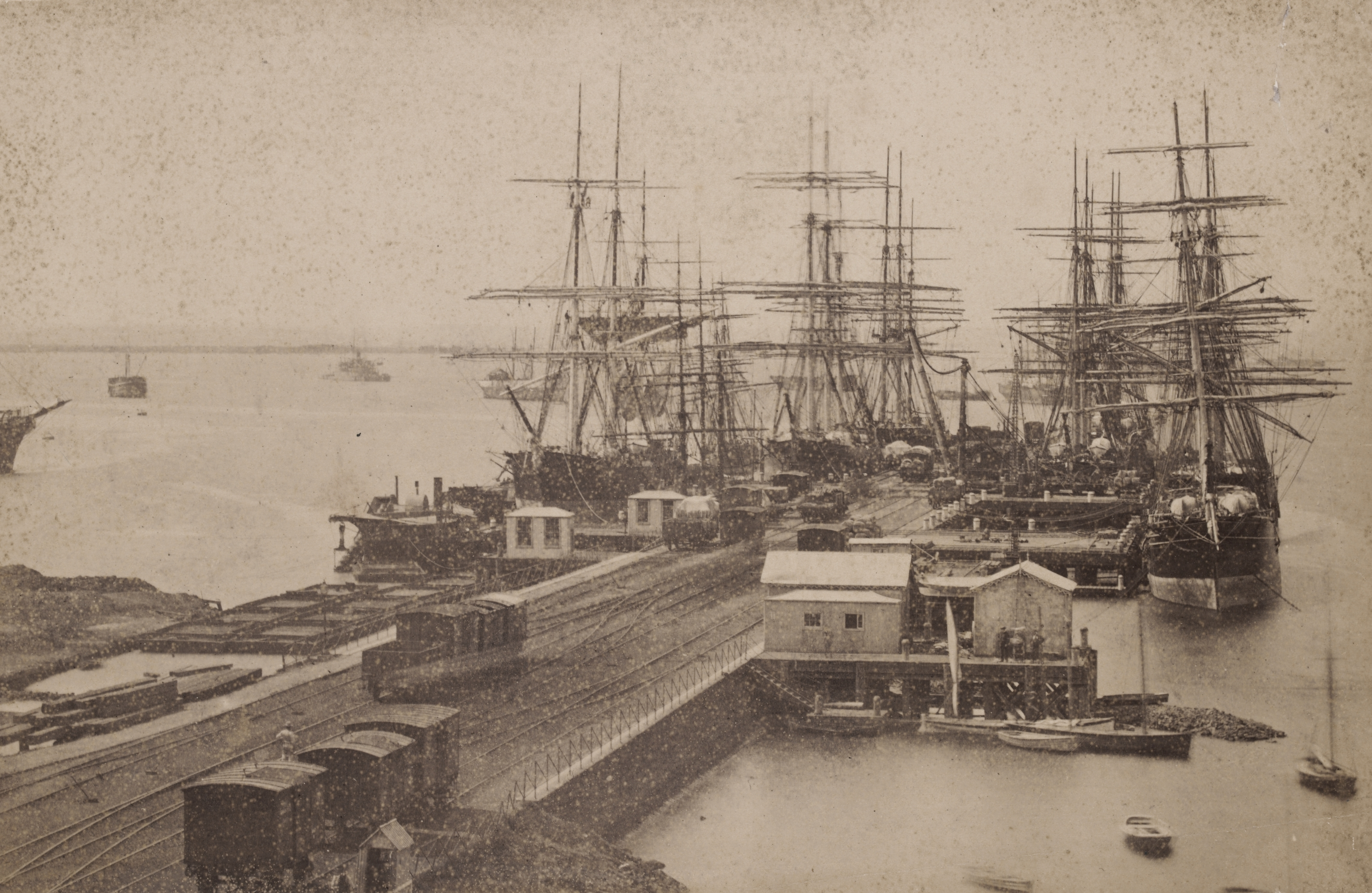
Railway Pier, 1883

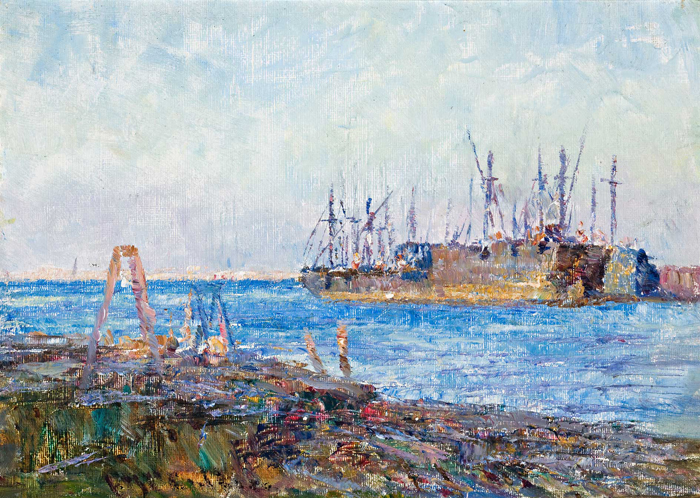
Frederick McCubbin, Ships, Williamstown (1910)

Between 1857 and 1889, the main railway workshops of the Victorian Railways were at Point Gellibrand, and at their height covered 85% of Point Gellibrand. Imported steam locomotives were assembled at the Williamstown Workshops. After 1889 the extensive workshops were moved to nearby Newport.

The Alfred Graving Dock is historically significant as the first graving dock in Victoria and the third in Australia at that time, for its role in the development of the shipping industry in Port Phillip, for its continuous use as a Dockyard since its completion and for association with William Wardell during his term as Inspector General of the Public Works Department.

Williamstown Baptist Church was officially founded in 1868, though a congregation had begun to form eight years earlier in response to an advertisement in the Williamstown Chronicle dated Saturday, 24 November 1860. Baptismal services were performed at the back beach at Williamstown from 1861 through to 1868, the first being performed 10 March 1861 by the Rev. David Rees of South Yarra. The Oddfellows' Hall was rented for services from December 1868. The Presbyterian schoolroom in Cecil Street was later used, followed by the Temperance Hall from April 1870. The Tabernacle, now the Church of Christ on Douglas Parade, was used after this. In January 1876 services reverted to the Oddfellows' Hall. In 1884 the Baptist Church building on Cecil Street was officially opened.

In 1873, the Royal Yacht Club of Victoria, founded in May 1853 as the Port Phillip Yacht Club, moved to its present site at 120 Nelson Place, adjacent to Gem Pier.

Williamstown North Primary School was established in 1874 and in that same year part of the market reserve was purchased from the Williamstown Council by the Education Department in order to build the Williamstown Primary School No. 1183.

The Williamstown CYMS football club was formed in 1886 and remains one of the oldest sporting clubs in Australia.

The Hobsons Bay Yacht Club, situated on Nelson Place at the end of Ferguson Street and adjacent to the pier.

The Yacht Club Hotel was built in 1892 at 207 Nelson Place, a site previously occupied by an iron-framed "wooden" hotel called the Lord Clyde. It was owned by Carlton and West End Breweries, later the Carlton Brewery Ltd.

The Williamstown Hospital opened in 1894 when the community responded to the increasing risk of accidents from a busy port, the railway workshops and the growing industrial area of Newport, Spotswood and Footscray to establish Melbourne's first suburban public general hospital.

Williamstown Central Tennis Club is on a site at the corner of Ferguson Street and Melbourne Road.

The Williamstown Lacrosse Club was founded in 1898 at a meeting in the Williamstown Baptist Sunday School called by Arthur Whitley (son of the Minister). Arthur Whitley became the first Captain and Fred Scott the first secretary.

=== 20th century ===
Williamstown Pier railway station was opened on 8 January 1905. The station existed primarily to serve workers employed in the Williamstown docks precinct and became the terminus of the Williamstown line.

In 1906, one of the largest undertakings attempted by ship repairers in Australia was successfully accomplished at the Williamstown Dockyard. SS Peregrine, a 1,660 GRT vessel of the Howard Smith Line, was lengthened amidships by 40 feet (12 m). This was perhaps the first "jumboising" operation undertaken in Australia.

The Williamstown Hospital was expanded with the addition of the Male Ward in 1911 and the Female Ward in 1917.

Heidelberg School impressionist artist Walter Withers painted numerous landscapes of Williamstown around 1910, at a time when fellow Heidelberg School impressionist artist Frederick McCubbin was also painting the Williamstown landscape. Between 1909 and 1915, McCubbin visited Williamstown on numerous occasions and produced sketches and watercolours of the foreshore and the old shipyards. He also produced a major oil painting of the Williamstown docks in 1915.

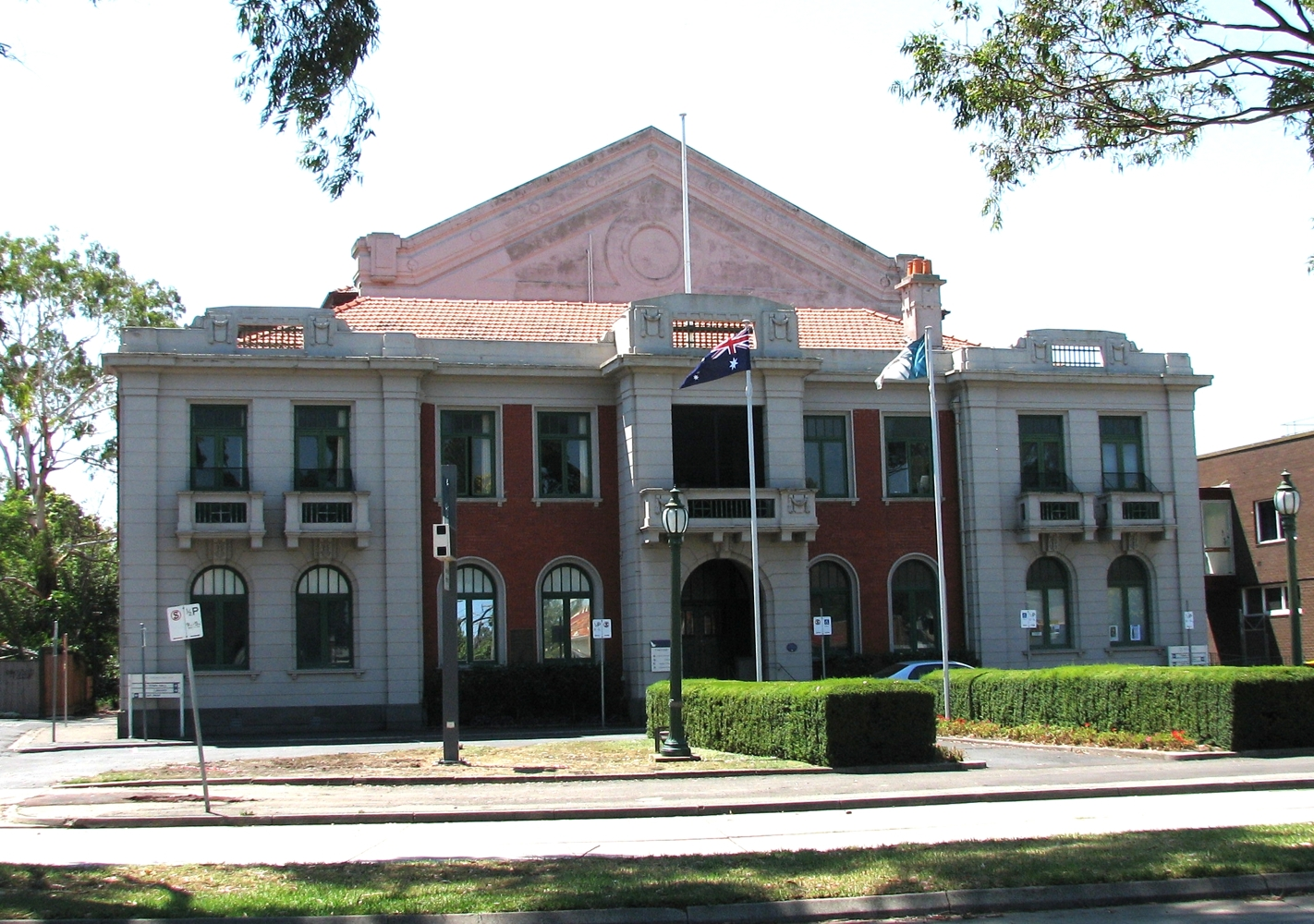
Former Williamstown Town Hall, Ferguson Street, 2008

Williamstown was proclaimed a City on 17 May 1919. Construction of the Williamstown Town Hall on Ferguson Street commenced a year earlier in 1918, but it was not officially opened until 1927.

The Williamstown and Newport Anglers Club was formed in 1933 and rented premises at 221 Nelson Place, moving next door to 223 in March 1935. In August 1939, the club was granted a site on the Esplanade and in 1941 a clubhouse was opened. A jetty and slipway were built the following year.

In 1934, the bluestone time ball tower (the former lighthouse) was extended by 30 feet (9.1 m) with a circular brick tower on top. The extension was then painted with a coat of aluminium paint and it was re-established as a lighthouse, due to the loss of singularity against the light of the City behind the Point Gellibrand Pile Light. It was electrically lit and gave a green and red light with a visibility of 15 nautical miles (28 km). It operated as a lighthouse until 1987.

Also in 1946, nine Williamstown residents met to form the Williamstown Little Theatre Movement. Through the 1950s and 1960s, Williamstown Little Theatre had several homes in Williamstown; from the Mechanic's Institute to the Williamstown Town Hall Supper Room and the former Missions to Seamen building in Nelson Place. In 1967 the theatre company moved into its current venue, a converted bakery on Albert Street.

In 1948, an electoral redistribution saw Williamstown included in the new Australian Federal electoral Division of Gellibrand, named after Joseph Tice Gellibrand (1786–1836). It was proclaimed in 1949 and was first won in that year by the Australian Labor Party candidate, John Michael Mullens. He held the seat until 1955.

The destroyer HMAS Anzac was commissioned at Williamstown Naval Dockyard on 14 March 1951 under the command of Commander John Plunkett-Cole RAN.

The Merrett Rifle Range at Williamstown was the rifle-shooting venue for the 1956 Olympic Games.

In May 1962, the City of Williamstown annexed 83 hectares (210 acres) from the Shire of Altona.

The Pile Light anchored off Shelly Beach in 1860 was destroyed in 1976 when it was hit by the Melbourne Trader, a vessel of 7,000 tonnes. The force of the collision snapped the piles at waterline area, the light was sheared off its piles at water level, pushed 7 metres (23 feet) sideways, and was left hanging precariously on several of the remaining piles.

The Urban Land Authority developed 60 hectares of the estate for housing and related commercial and community activities. Residential allotments were progressively released for sale from May 1991. The historic armoury building of the old rifle range was preserved, refurbished and is now as a funeral home set in a large formal garden.

The remaining 50 hectares was reserved for the protection of the surrounding environmentally sensitive area. This area, now known as the Jawbone Flora and Fauna Reserve consists of open grasslands for passive recreation, two wetland lakes, the saltmarsh and mangrove conservation area, Wader Beach and the Kororoit Creek.

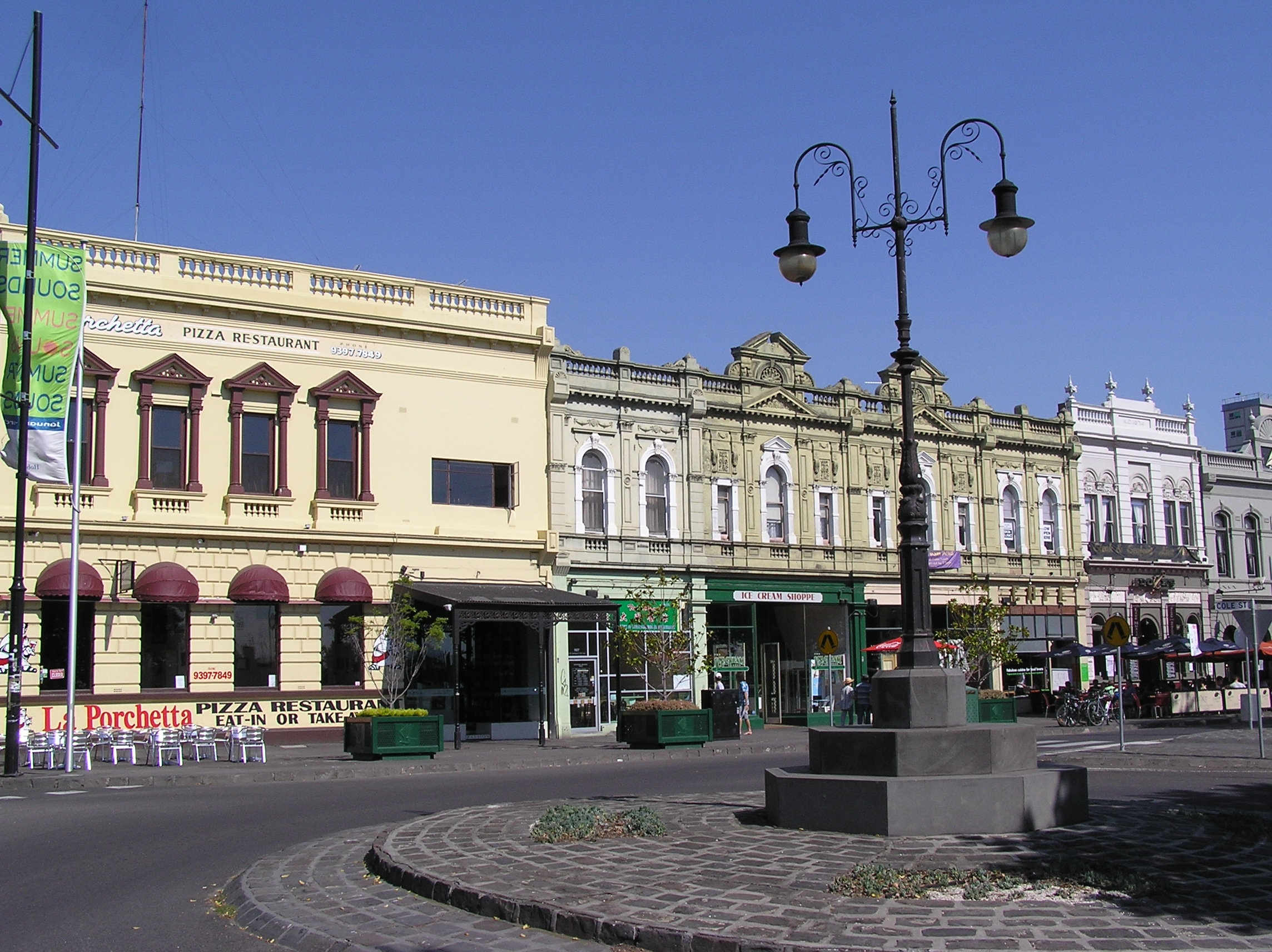
Nelson Place, 2008

== Governance ==
Williamstown is within the Victorian electoral district of Williamstown. The 2007 by-election was triggered by the resignation of Steve Bracks as both Premier of Victoria and the Member for Williamstown. Wade Noonan successfully contested the election with 61.7% of the primary vote. The Liberal Party did not contest the seat in 2007.

The 2010 state election saw a very different result with a huge swing against the government. The ALP's primary vote was 46.75% (compared to 61.7 in 2007), with the Liberal Party polling 32.5% of the primary vote. In the 2014 state election, Noonan retained the seat with a primary vote of 44.6%.

== Schools ==
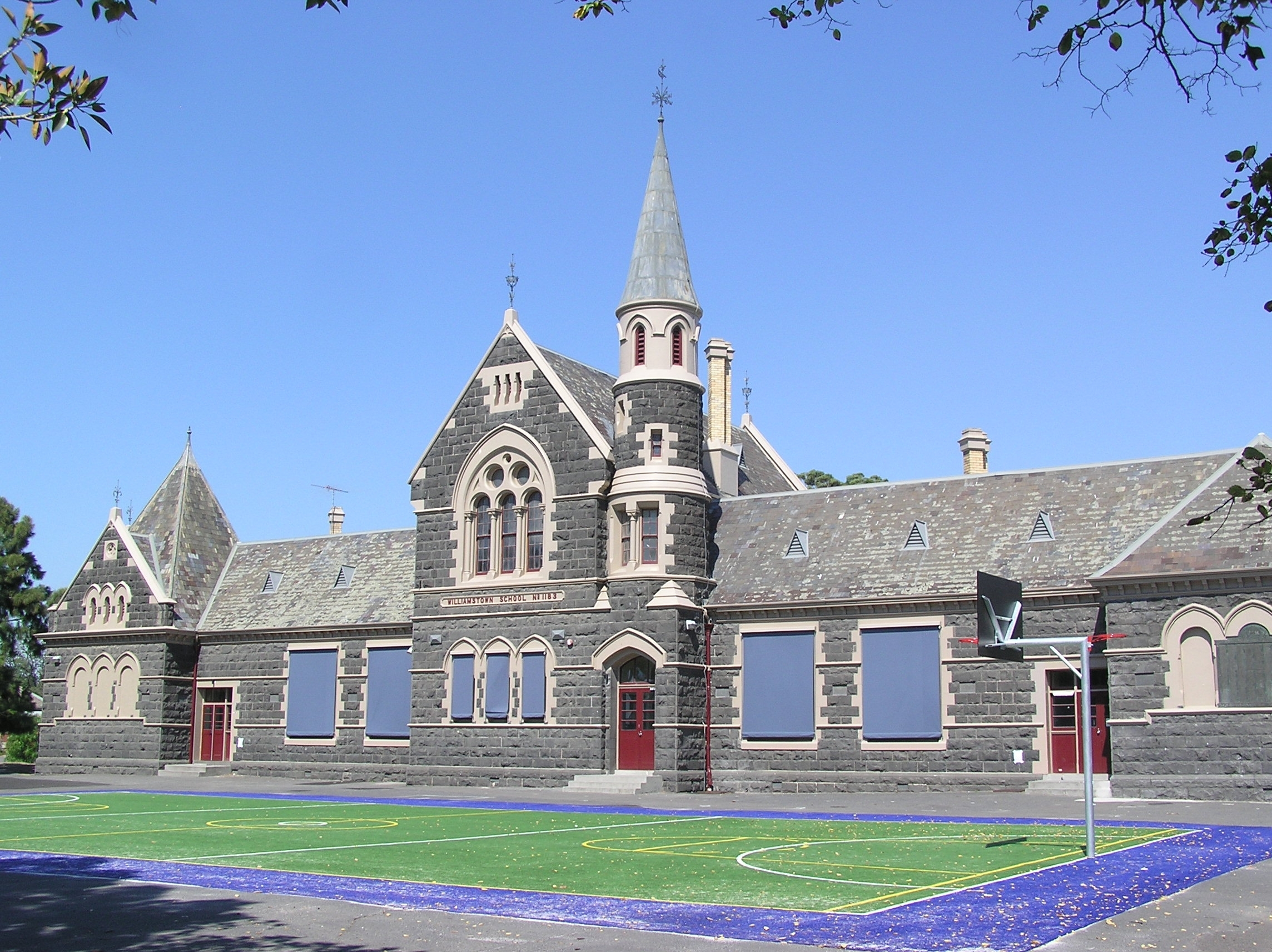
Williamstown Primary School, 2008

Primary schools in the area include St. Mary's Primary School, Williamstown Primary School and Williamstown North Primary School.

State High schools in the area include Bayside Secondary College and Williamstown High School, (Pasco and Bayview Street Campuses).

The Junior School at the Williamstown campus of Westbourne Grammar School is housed in the National Trust classified Victorian mansion "Monomeith" at 67 The Strand.

== Places of worship ==
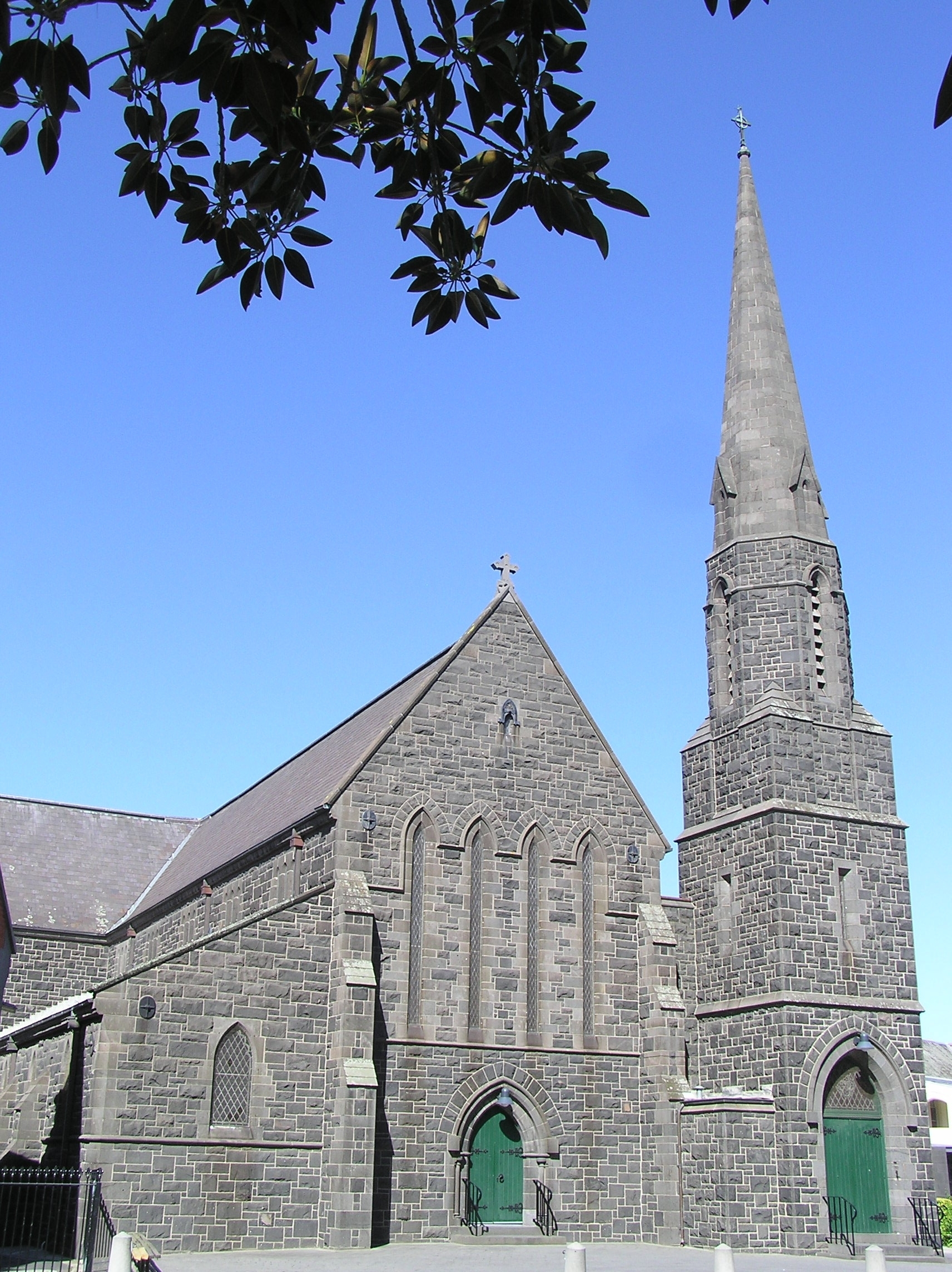
St Mary's Catholic Church, 2007

- St Mary's Catholic Church (Cecil Street)
- St Andrew's Presbyterian Church (Cecil Street).
- Holy Trinity Anglican Church (Nelson Place). A Gothic Revival style bluestone church constructed to the designs of architect Leonard Terry between 1871 and 1874 to replace an imported prefabricated iron structure erected in the 1850s. It is distinguished by its two roof pitches, large west window, varied window forms and proportions generally. A five bay church with side aisles and nave, it was not erected to its planned size and the projected tower and spire were never built.
- St John's Uniting Church, formerly Methodist (Electra Street).
- Williamstown Gospel Mission Church (Electra Street)
- St Stephen's Uniting Church (179 Melbourne Road)
- Westgate Vineyard Church (meeting in the former Stevedore Street Uniting Church building) (57 Stevedore Street, east of Douglas Parade). A Gothic Revival style bluestone church designed by architect Joseph Schneider and built c1870. The proportions of the lantern and spire to its base and the detailing of the enframed storey are unusual. Westgate Vineyard Church moved from Yarraville to Williamtown in October 2011 and is part of the Association of Vineyard Churches in Australia
- Church of Christ (Douglas Parade)

== Economy ==
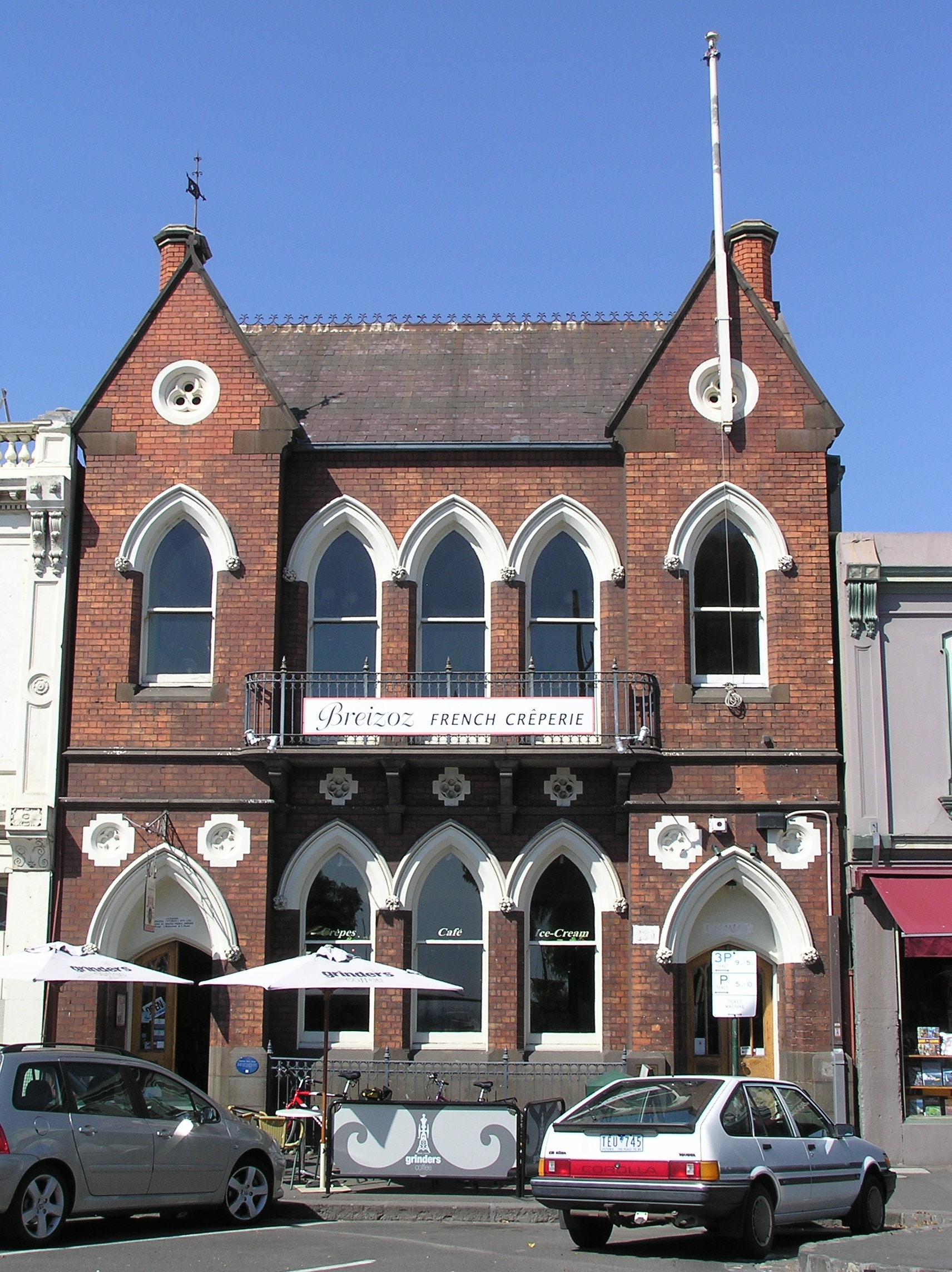
Former Missions to Seamen building in Nelson Place, 2008

Representative of Williamstown's maritime history, large scale maritime industry dominates Williamstown's piers precinct and a maritime theme characterises the Nelson Place tourism precinct.

BAE Systems Australia's Marine division (formerly Tenix) has operated out of Williamstown dockyards for nearly 20 years, during which time it built Anzac-class frigates for the Royal Australian Navy, and completed the Canberra-class Landing Helicopter Dock ships.

Williamstown remains a working port, with the Point Gellibrand fuel terminal providing the port facility for the Altona Refinery operated by ExxonMobil at Altona North. When the refinery closes, it will continue to be used as an import terminal.

The Nelson Place tourism precinct offers, many catering for al fresco dining and some with views of Melbourne's city skyline through the masts of bobbing boats on the foreshore. Also located on Nelson Place is a diverse range of arts, crafts and other speciality shops.

Around the corner from Nelson Place there is a local retail sector operating on Ferguson Street and Douglas Parade. Ferguson Street has a mix of restaurants, cafes, two hotels and a range of retail shops. This mix of small retail businesses extends around the corner into Douglas Parade.

In Williamstown North, there remains the railway engineering industry. There is also a light-industrial/commercial park.

== Culture ==
The Williamstown Festival, held each year in March/April, is the major Community Festival for the Western Region of Melbourne.

The Williamstown Literary Festival (held in May) is a popular local cultural event focusing on literature, drama and writing which presents established and emerging writers and literary figures. There is a strong focus on local participation, with the annual Peoples Choice awards showcasing aspiring local writers and poets.

A maritime museum is located on board the World War II minesweeping corvette HMAS Castlemaine, which is tied up at Gem Pier adjacent to Commonwealth Reserve.

Williamstown Little Theatre, open since 1946 and located at a converted bakery at 2–4 Albert Street, is one of the leading non-professional theatre companies in Melbourne.

Williamstown has also been used in a number of Australian television shows including The Henderson Kids with a number of local landmarks used.

== Sports and recreation ==
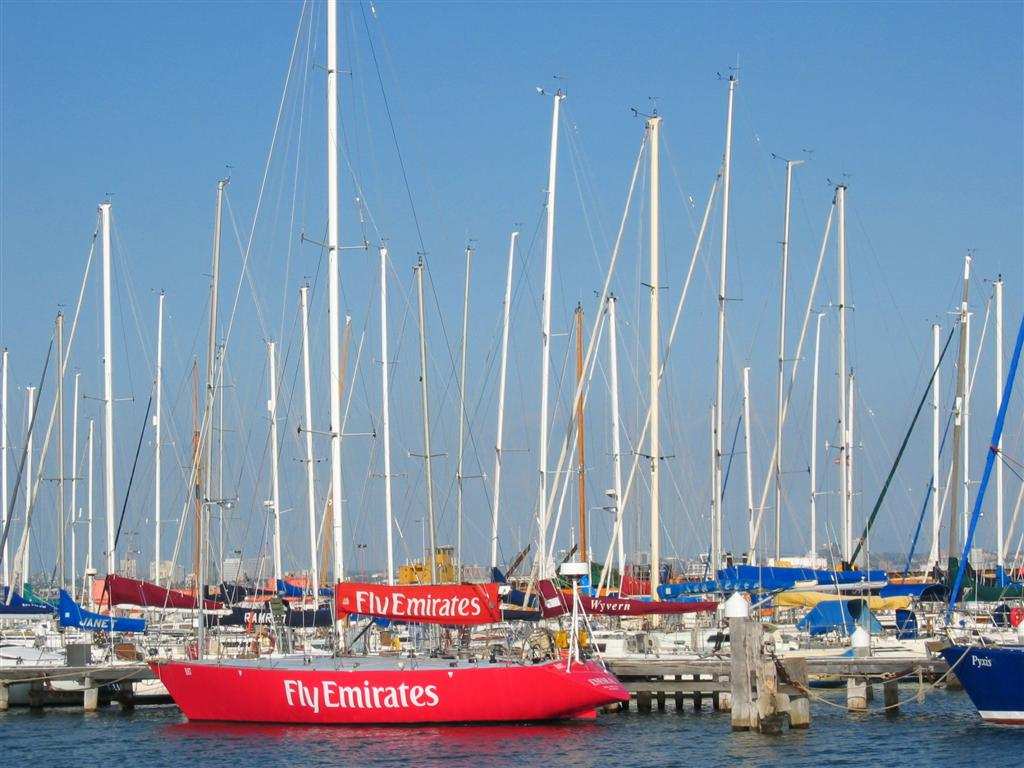
Royal Yacht Club of Victoria, 2005

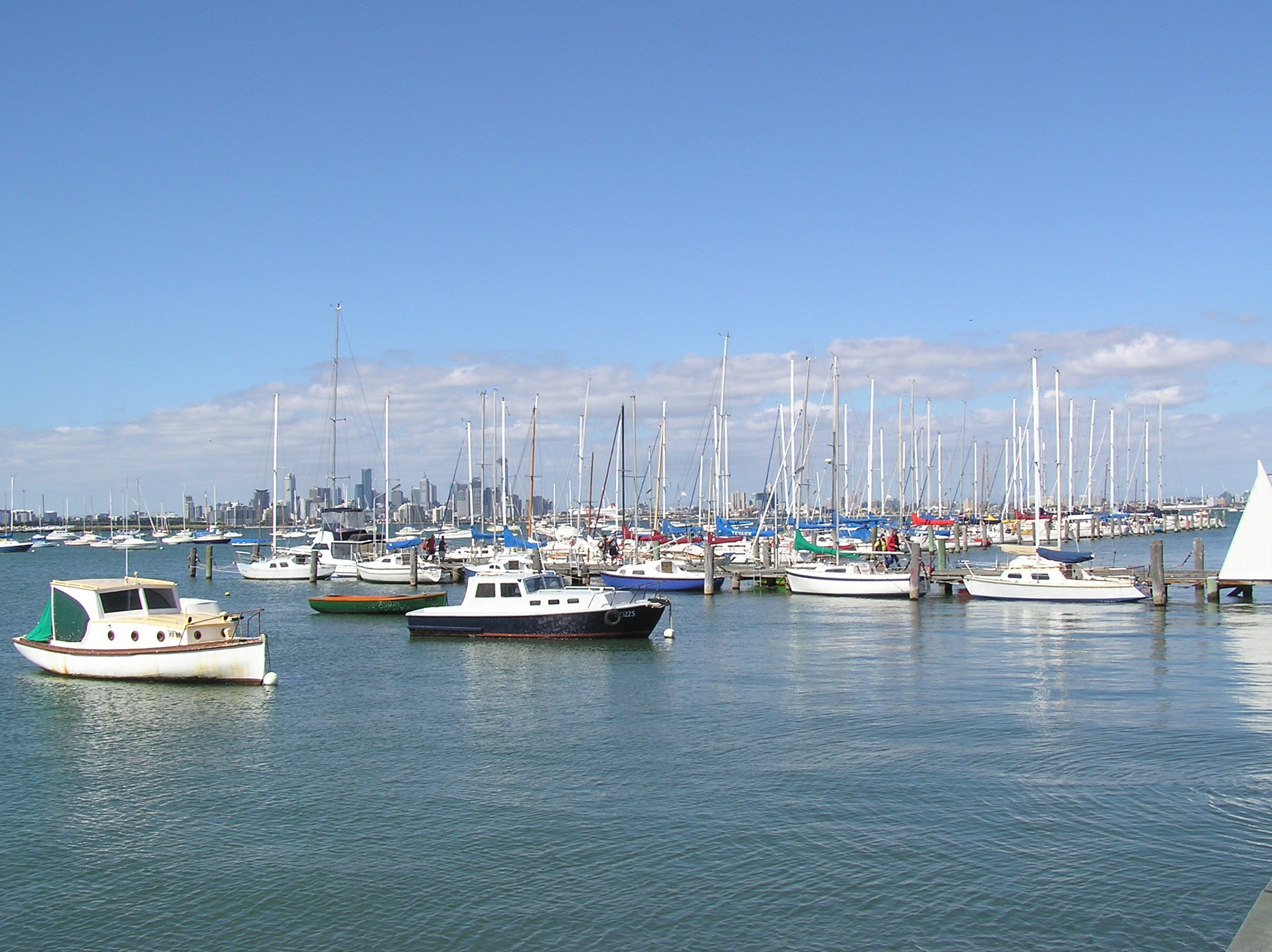
Hobsons Bay Yacht Club (established 1888)

There is a strong maritime feel to Williamstown, created by both the presence of the Williamstown Lighthouse, BAE Systems (ship building yard proprietors) and the many yachts floating on Hobsons Bay. The Williamstown Sailing Club, Royal Yacht Club of Victoria, Hobson's Bay Yacht Club, and Royal Victorian Motor Yacht Club are all located on Nelson Place.

The Williamstown Seagulls are a semi-professional Victorian Football League team that plays at Burbank Oval. They have won 13 VFA/VFL Premierships, and were also crowned League Championship Cup winners in 2011 and 2014.

Williamstown CYMS Football Club is the senior amateur football club of Williamstown. The CYs were formed in 1886 and currently field three teams in the Victorian Amateur Football Association (VAFA).

The Williamstown Juniors Football Club fielded 17 teams in the WRFL for 2007, the highest of any club. Notable AFL players from Williamstown Juniors are Daniel Giansiracusa of the Western Bulldogs, and Ben Davies of the Collingwood Magpies and North Melbourne Kangaroos.

Williamstown Cricket Club is the third oldest in Victoria having run continuously since 1852. The Club run four senior sides as well as a women's team and nine junior sides. Williamstown Cricket Club compete in the Victorian Sub-District Cricket Association and ended season 2006/07 as Premiership Champions.

Williamstown Imperial sCricket Club is located on the Fearon Reserve closest to Williamstown Beach.

Williamstown Wolves Baseball Club was established in 1908 and is located at Greenwich Reserve, The Strand. The club plays in the Baseball Victoria Summer League Competition

The Williamstown Magic Basketball Club and Williamstown Cannons Basketball Club both field many junior teams in the Altona Bay Basketball Association.

Williamstown is also home to a local soccer club, Williamstown SC. Established in 1981, Williamstown SC's home ground is JT Gray Reserve on Kororoit Creek Road. The First and Reserves Teams play in FFV's Men's State League and the club also has Juniors from 4-year-olds upwards and a Masters Team of over-35-year-olds.

Lacrosse, a minor sport in Australia, is also popular in Williamstown. Three clubs, the Williamstown Lacrosse Club, Williamstown Women's Lacrosse Club and Newport Ladies Lacrosse club all use the Fearon Reserve as their club house and home field.

For the 1956 Summer Olympics, the city hosted the pistol and rifle portion of the shooting and the shooting part of the modern pentathlon events.

International tennis star Mark Philippoussis grew up in Williamstown. Other notable sports stars who live in the area include Australian Football League players Chris Grant and Rohan Smith both of the Western Bulldogs in the Australian Football League.

The Hobsons Bay Coastal Trail runs through Williamstown and is a very popular trail with recreational users. A section of the trail is used by the Hobsons Bay Running Club for their monthly handicap.

Scouts Australia has a Sea Scout and a Scout group in Williamstown.

== Transport ==
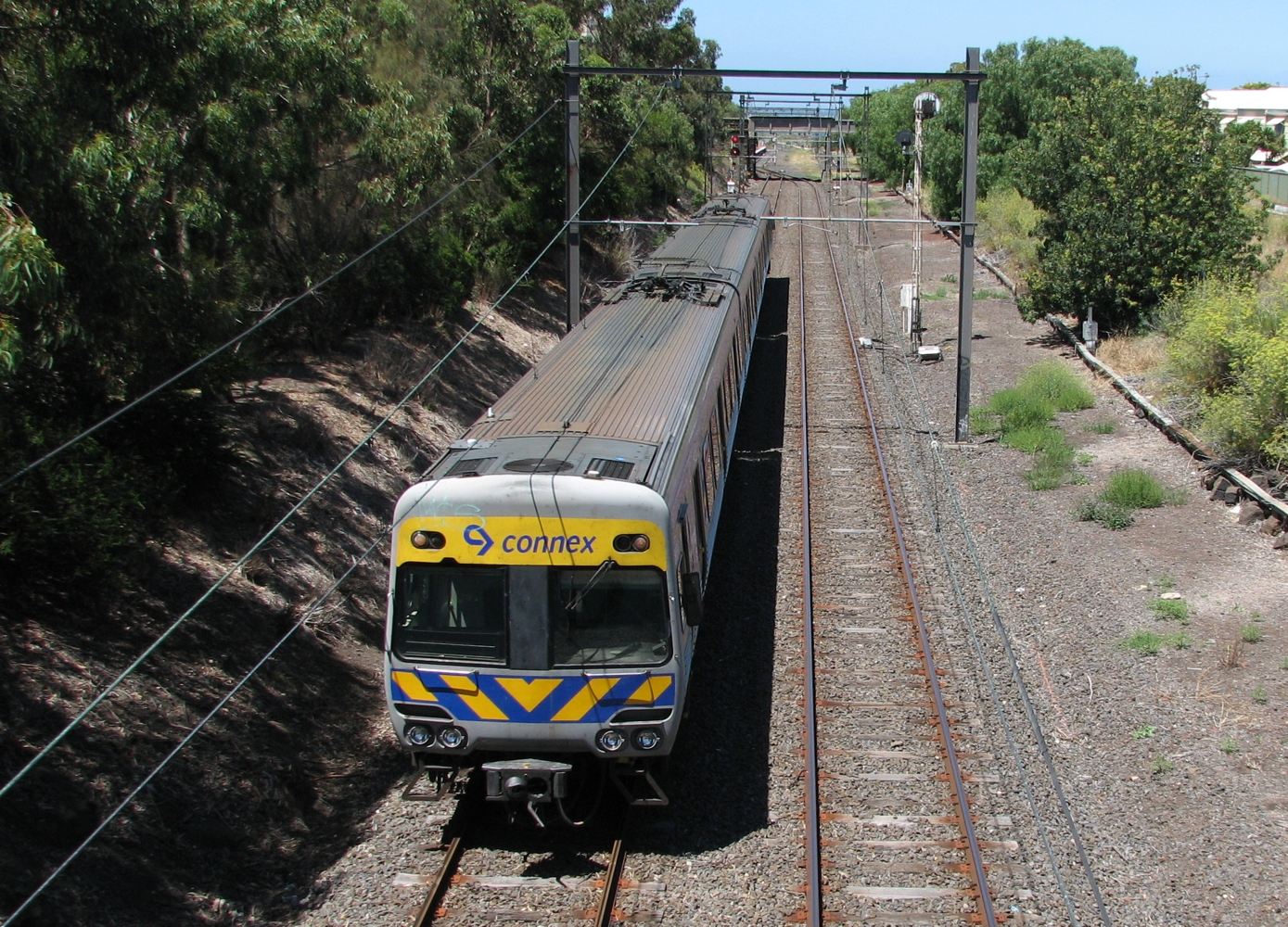
Williamstown railway line, 2008

In light traffic, Williamstown is approximately 15 minutes by car from Melbourne via the West Gate Freeway or a 30-minute train journey from Flinders Street station. Ferries from Melbourne's Southgate Arts & Leisure Precinct take approximately an hour.

Williamstown is served by three railway stations: North Williamstown, Williamstown Beach and Williamstown, all on the Williamstown railway line.

There are three bus routes which connect Williamstown with surrounding suburbs.

The principal road connections from Williamstown are Kororoit Creek Road leading westward toward Altona and Laverton and two roads which head northward to Newport and Spotswood, namely Douglas Parade and Melbourne Road. The latter connects to central Melbourne via the West Gate Bridge.

A ferry service connects Williamstown's Gem Pier area with St Kilda and Port Melbourne. It operates 7 days a week in peak season, with a limited service in cooler months.

== Notable residents ==
- Steve Bracks AC, 44th Premier of Victoria and MP for Williamstown
- Bill Deller OAM, Australian rules football umpire and director
- Tony Dodemaide, cricketer and administrator
- Richard Greaves, author and prospector
- Richard Green, golfer and racing driver
- Andy Griffiths, author
- Lachlan Hunter, AFL player
- Brad Johnson, Western Bulldogs captain
- Molly Jovic, netballer
- Beatrice Kerr, swimmer and diver, born in Williamstown in 1887
- Shaun Micallef, comedian and television presenter
- Wade Noonan, politician and member for Williamstown
- Rohan Smith, Western Bulldogs footballer

== Gallery ==
Location of Williamstown

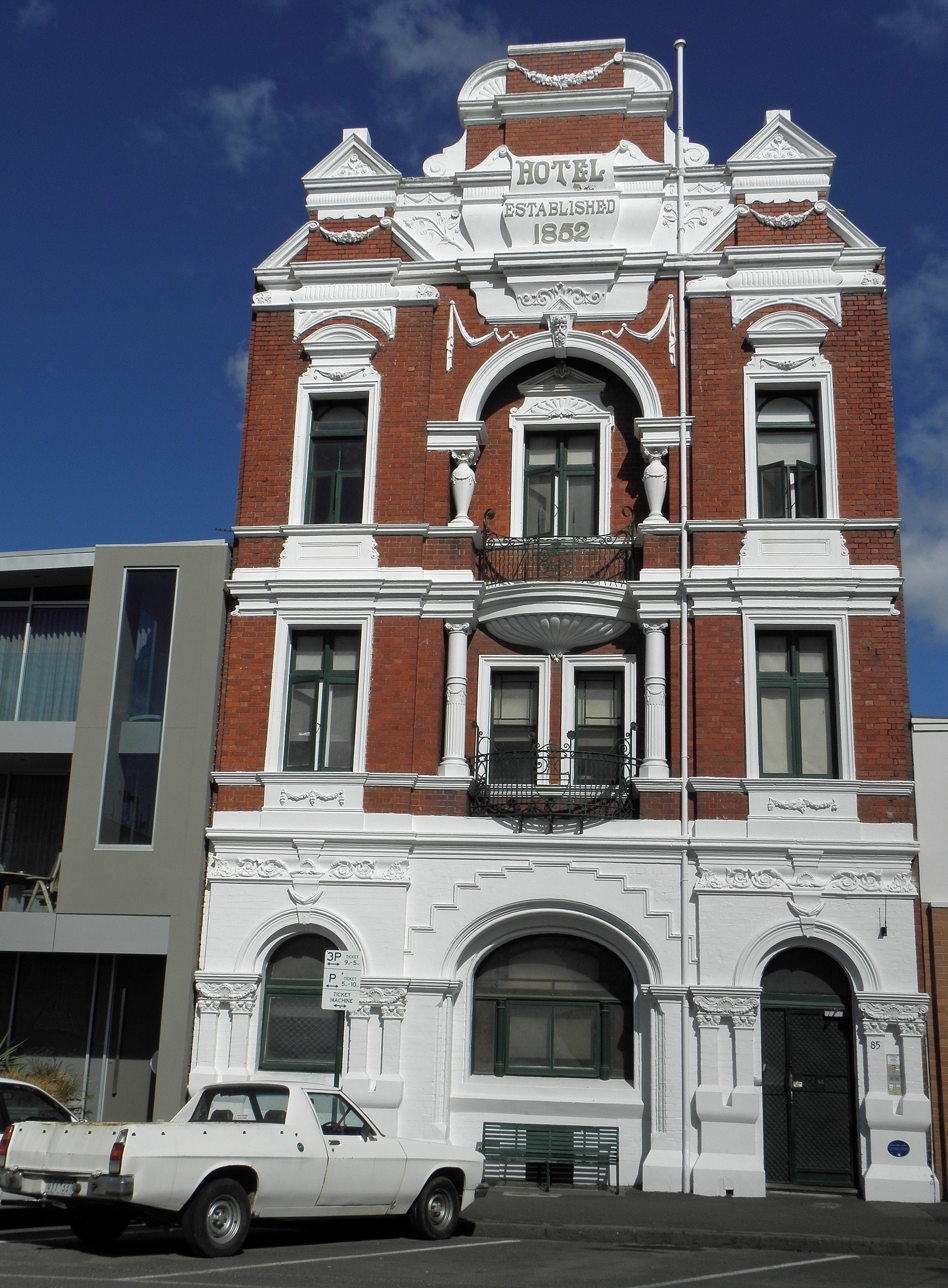
Old Royal Hotel (established 1852, rebuilt circa 1890s)

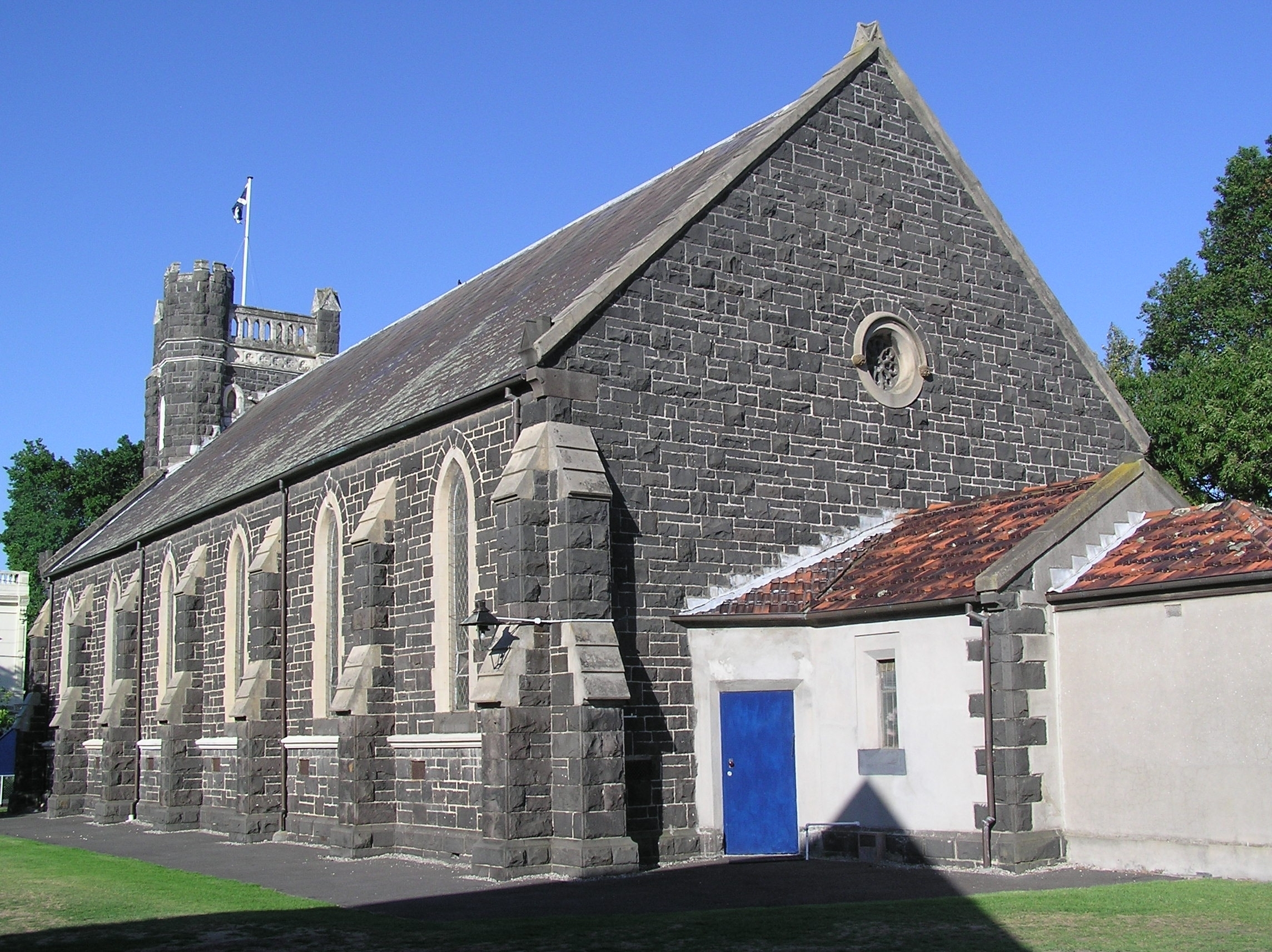
St. Andrew's Presbyterian Church (built 1870)

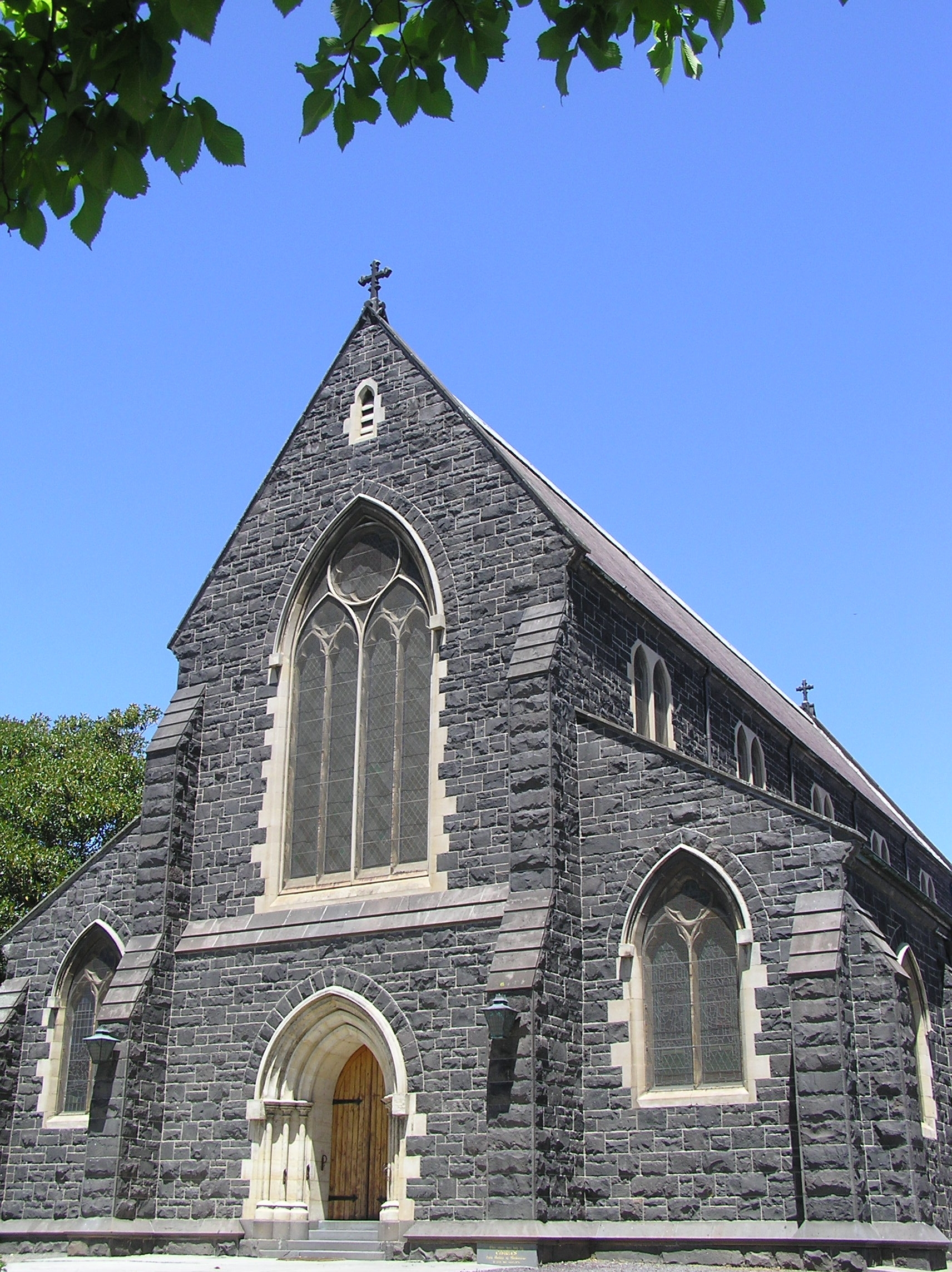
Holy Trinity Church of England in Nelson Place

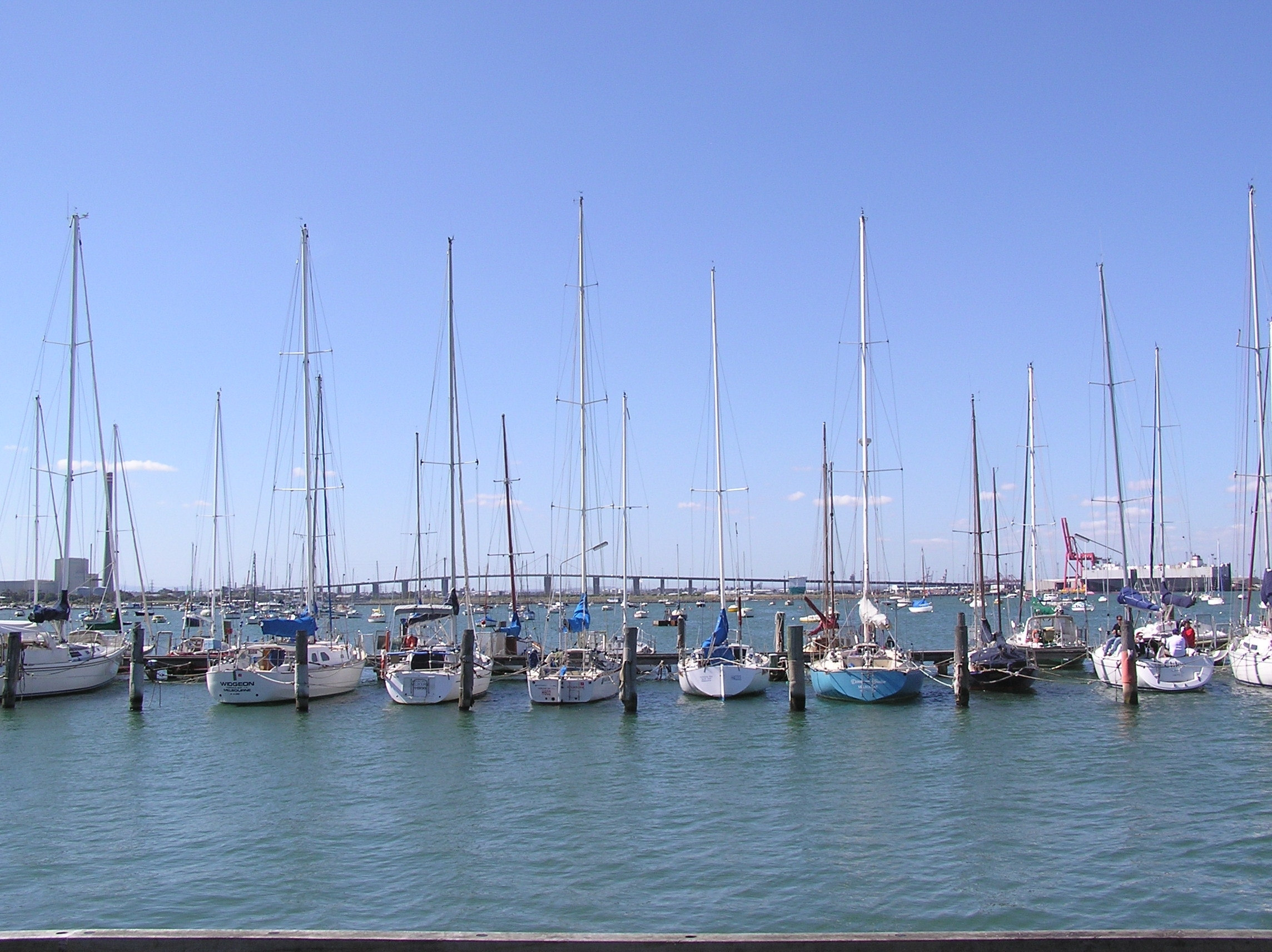
West Gate Bridge seen from Williamstown

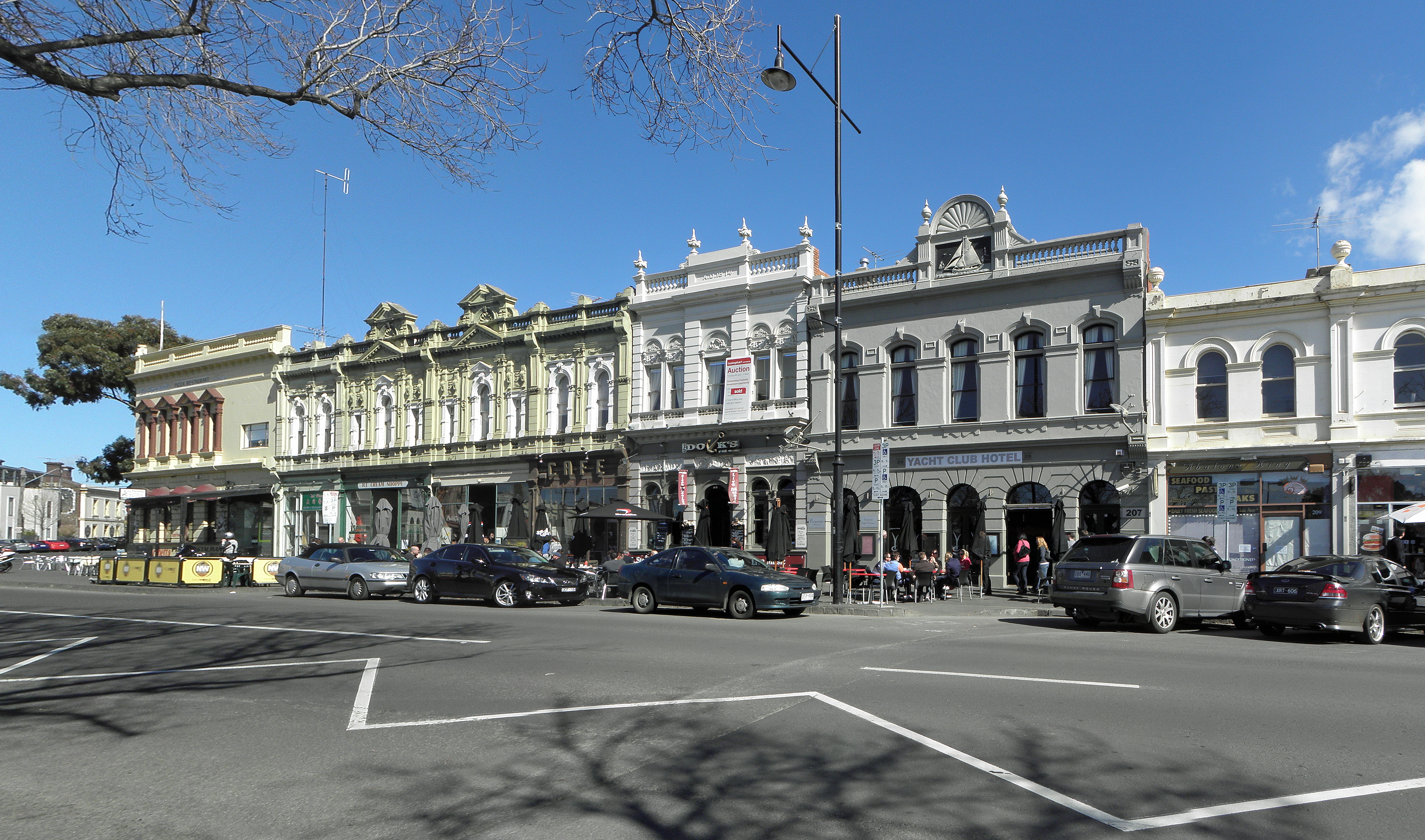
Nelson Place

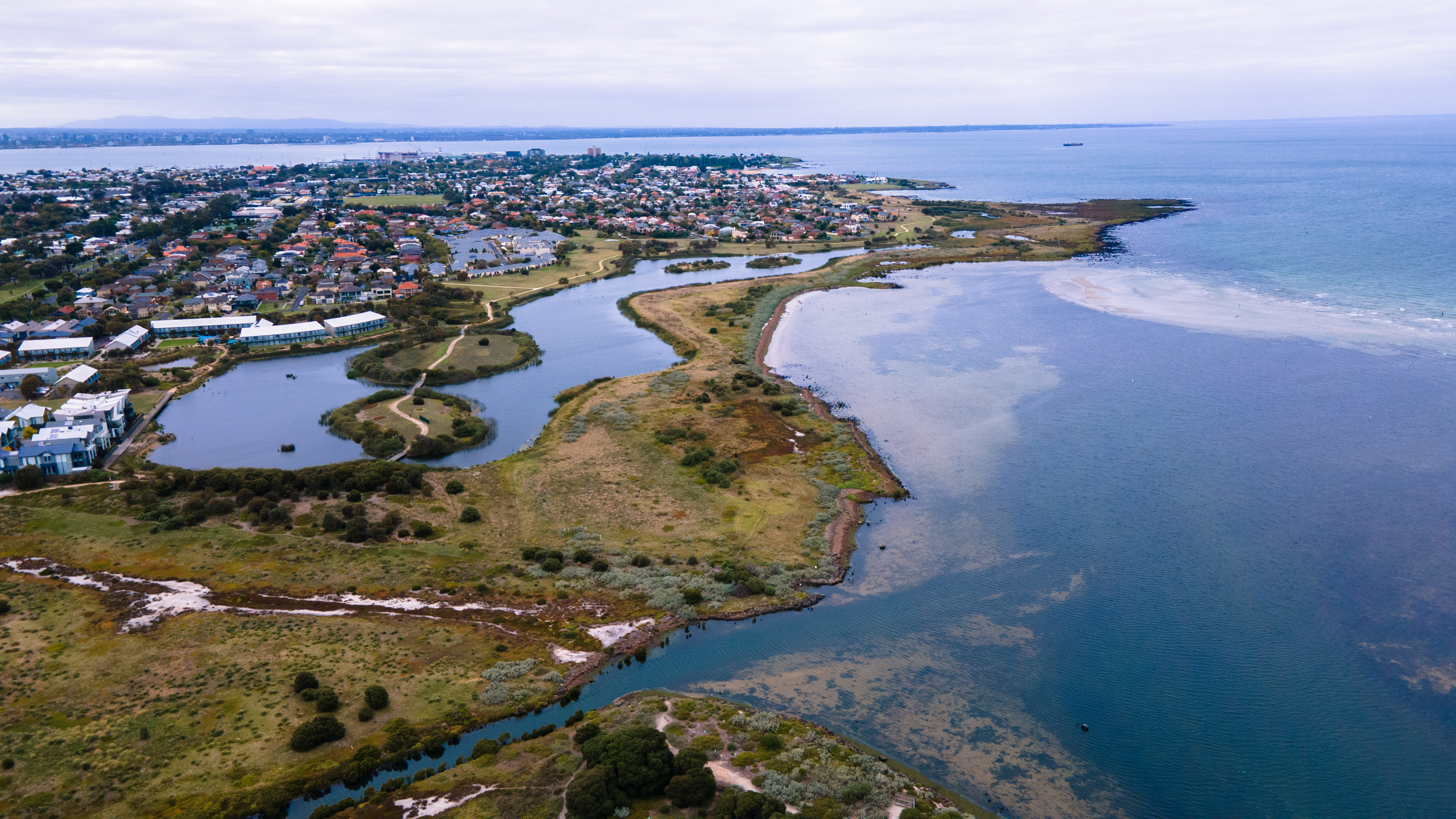
Aerial view looking south-east towards Williamstown from Altona Coastal Park, 2021

== See also ==
- City of Williamstown – Williamstown was previously within this former local government area.
