= Williamstown Town Hall =

Civic building in Melbourne, Australia

Coordinates: 37°51′30″S 144°53′46″E

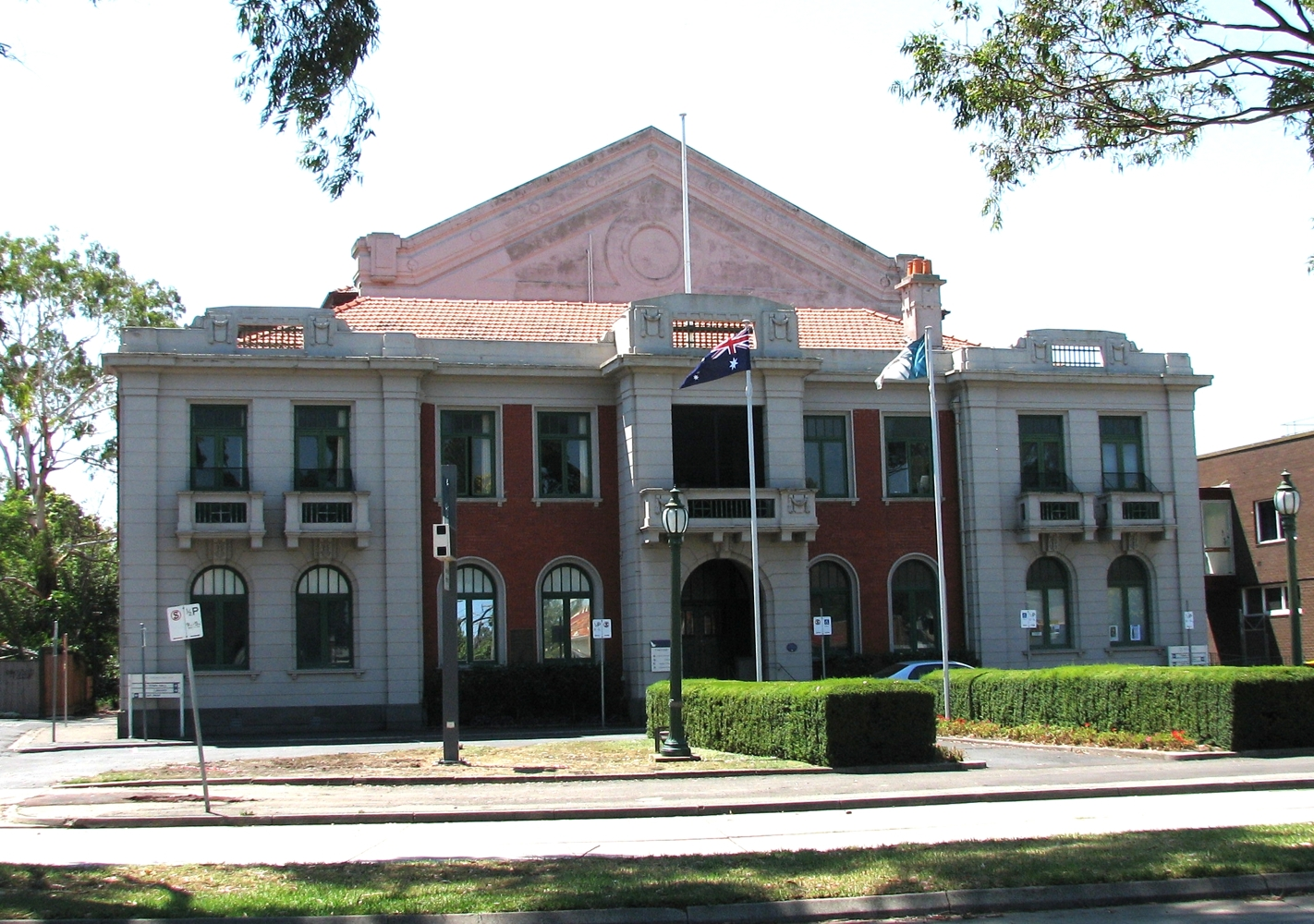
Williamstown Town Hall, Ferguson Street

Williamstown Town Hall is a civic building located in Williamstown, a suburb of Melbourne, Australia.

The hall was built in two stages, the first being the front municipal offices, designed in the Greek revival style to the design of then young architect Joseph Plottel, dating from 1919. The hall behind was added to the design of Gibbs, Finlay & Morsby, and officially opened in 1927.

After the City of Williamstown was amalgamated with the City of Altona in 1994 to form the new City of Hobsons Bay, the building continued to be used for council meetings, though not as often as its Altona counterpart.

== See also ==
- List of town halls in Melbourne
