= City of Williamstown =

Coordinates: 37°51′43″S 144°53′20″E

- Local government area
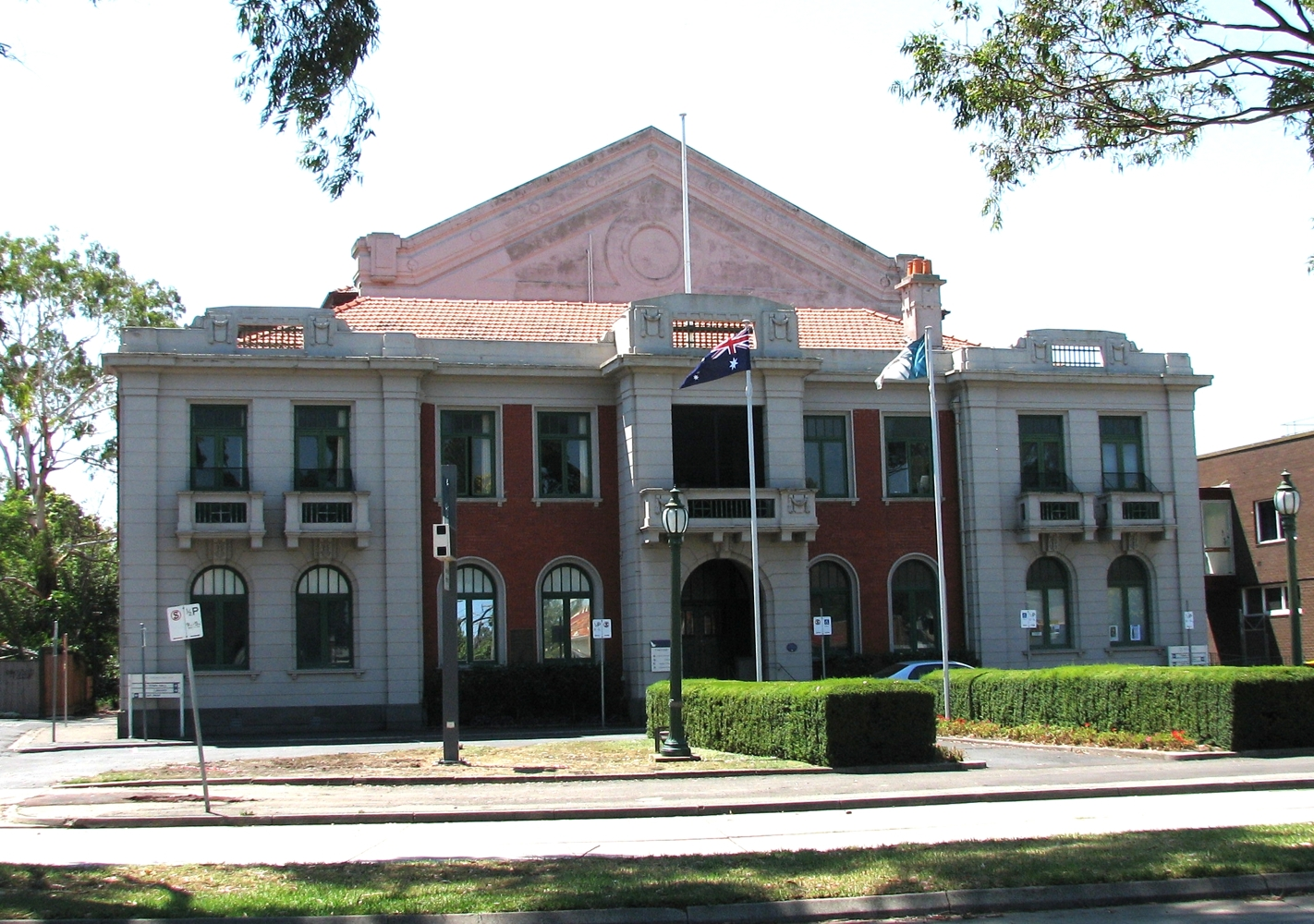
- Williamstown Town Hall, Ferguson Street

- The City of Williamstown as at its dissolution in 1994
- Country: Australia
- State: Victoria
- Region: Southwestern Melbourne
- Established: 1919
- Council seat: Williamstown

Area
  - Total: 14.50 km^{2} (5.60 sq mi)

Population
  - Total(s): 25,947 (1991)
  - Density: 1,789.4/km^{2} (4,634.6/sq mi)
- County: Bourke
LGAs around City of Williamstown
Altona; Footscray	Footscray	Footscray; Port Melbourne
Altona	City of Williamstown	Port Melbourne; Port Phillip
Port Phillip	Port Phillip	Port Phillip

The City of Williamstown was a local government area about 10 kilometres (6 mi) southwest of Melbourne, the state capital of Victoria, Australia. The city covered an area of 14.50 square kilometres (5.60 sq mi), and existed from 1919 until 1994.

== History ==
Williamstown was first incorporated as a borough on 14 March 1856. It became a town on 2 April 1886, and was proclaimed a city on 17 May 1919. In May 1962, it annexed 83 hectares (205 acres) from the Shire of Altona.

On 22 June 1994, the City of Williamstown was abolished, and along with the City of Altona and a couple of small neighbouring areas, was merged into the newly created City of Hobsons Bay.

=== Town Hall ===
Council meetings were held in a variety of locations in Williamstown until a permanent home was constructed. In its early years, the council met at the Police Court, as well as a rented property in Nelson Place, and later at the newly erected Court House. In 1869, the council took over the Town Hall in Thompson Street, finally moving to the purpose-built municipal building in Ferguson Street, known as Williamstown Town Hall, which was officially opened in 1927. The facility is still used for council meetings by the City of Hobsons Bay, although not as much as its Altona counterpart.

== Electricity supply ==
Commencing in 1916, the municipality ran its own electricity supply utility for a number of years, the first customer being connected in July 1917. After six months in operation, it had around 400 customers, increasing to around 5,600 by 1934.

== Wards ==
On 28 October 1887, the City of Williamstown was subdivided into four wards:

- South Ward
- North Ward
- Centre Ward
- Victoria Ward

At dissolution, each ward elected three councillors.

== Suburbs ==
- Newport
- Spotswood (shared with the City of Footscray)
- Williamstown*
- Williamstown North

* Council seat.

== Population ==
Year	Population
1954	29,313
1958	31,100*
1961	30,962
1966	30,416
1971	30,055
1976	26,427
1981	25,554
1986	23,287
1991	25,947

* Estimate in the 1958 Victorian Year Book.
