= South Kingsville =

- Suburb
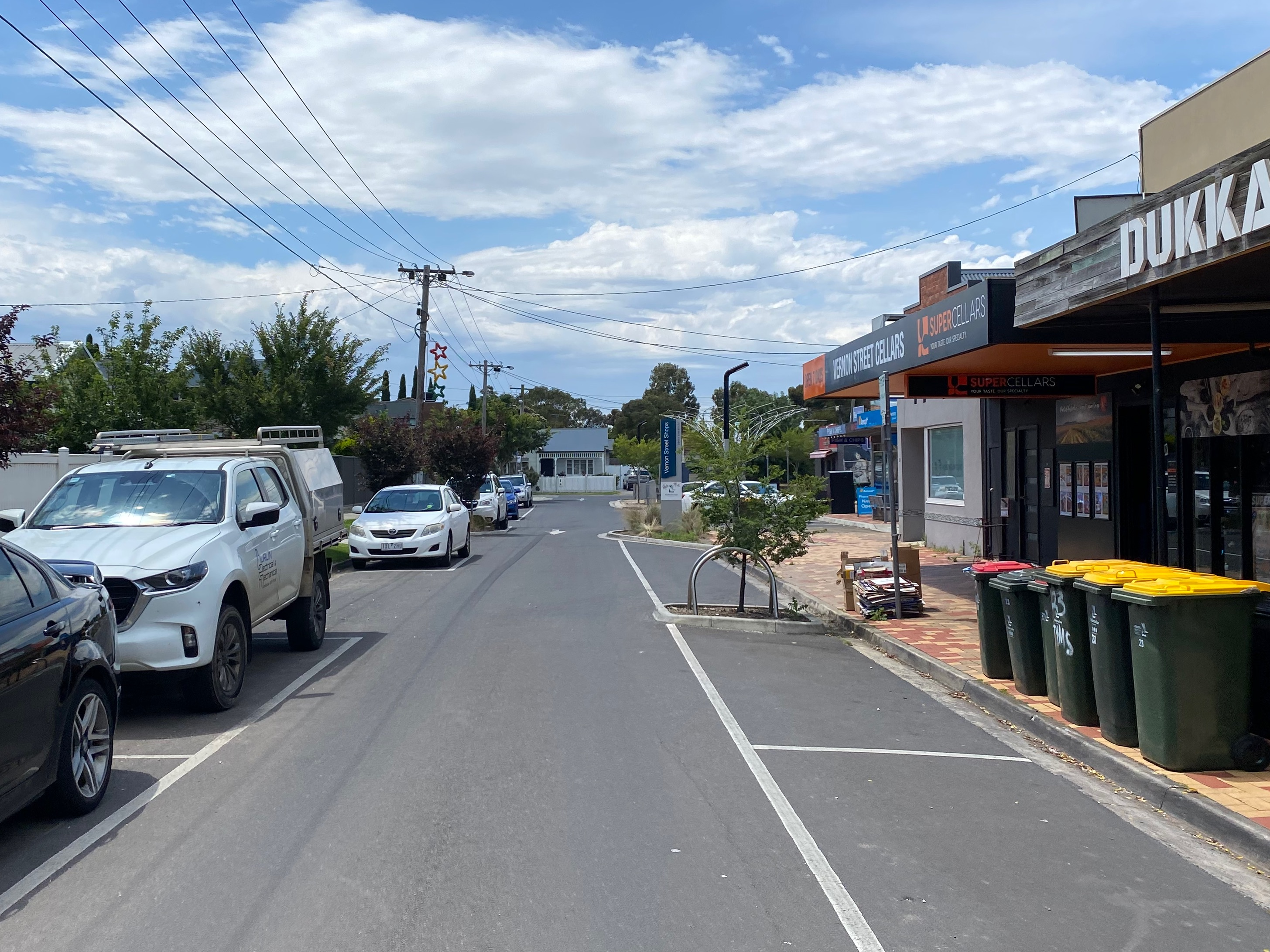
- The Vernon St shopping strip

- Interactive map of South Kingsville
- Coordinates: 37.819°S 144.873°E
- Country: Australia
- State: Victoria
- City: Melbourne
- LGA: City of Hobsons Bay
- Location: 8 km (5.0 mi) from Melbourne

Government
  - State electorate: Williamstown
  - Federal division: Gellibrand

Area
  - Total: 0.6 km^{2} (0.23 sq mi)
- Elevation: 18 m (59 ft)

Population
  - Total: 2,156 (2021 census)
  - Density: 3,590/km^{2} (9,300/sq mi)
- Postcode: 3015
Suburbs around South Kingsville
Yarraville	Yarraville	Spotswood
Altona North	South Kingsville	Spotswood
Altona North	Newport	Newport

South Kingsville is an inner suburb in Melbourne, Victoria, Australia, 8 km (5.0 mi) south-west of Melbourne's Central Business District, located within the City of Hobsons Bay local government area. South Kingsville recorded a population of 2,156 at the 2021 census.

The suburb is shaped as a right-angled triangle, bounded by New Street in the west, Blackshaws Road in the south, with the Newport-Sunshine railway line as a hypotenuse. Neighbouring suburbs include Newport, Yarraville, Altona North and Spotswood.

South Kingsville is approximately 10 minutes by car from Melbourne CBD via the West Gate Freeway and a 19-minute train journey using nearby Spotswood railway station.

== History ==
Development in Spotswood and South Kingsville began around the mid-1800s. In the 1840s, John Stewart Spotswood purchased 119 acres and began a dairy farm. The area of South Kingsville was originally called the Birmingham Estate and was subdivided in the 1880s, although it did not fully develop until after World War II; Kingsville South Post Office opening on 2 February 1948 (closing in 1978). This area had been re-zoned multiple times, being initially part of the Shire of Wyndham, later renamed Werribee, then from 1941 part of the City of Footscray, and finally, from 1994, part of Hobsons Bay. South Kingsville was also the location of Westgate Health Co-op, which was Australia's first-ever community medical co-operative (with a clinic still remaining in neighbouring Newport).

== Transport ==
Bus route

- 432 Newport ↔ Yarraville via Altona Gate Shopping Centre

== Today ==
At only 60 hectares, South Kingsville is the smallest suburb in the west of Melbourne.

Edwards Reserve in Brunel Street, South Kingsville, has one oval that is used for soccer and cricket. The reserve also has clubrooms, cricket nets, a basketball key, barbecue/picnic area and a children's playground.

The suburb is the home of the 5th Footscray Scout group, part of Scouts Australia – Kariwara District. The group meets in a private hall and is open to youth aged 6 to 26 years.

Vernon Street is the shopping strip of the suburb, also with Italian and Indian restaurants, and cafés. South Kingsville Community Centre is on nearby Paxton Street. providing a multitude of services to the community, such as: Pre School, Occasional Childcare Care facilities, Adult Education Courses, community activities and free access to computers and internet.

== See also ==
- City of Footscray – South Kingsville was previously within this former local government area.
