= City of Footscray =

Coordinates: 37°47′56″S 144°54′00″E

- Local government area
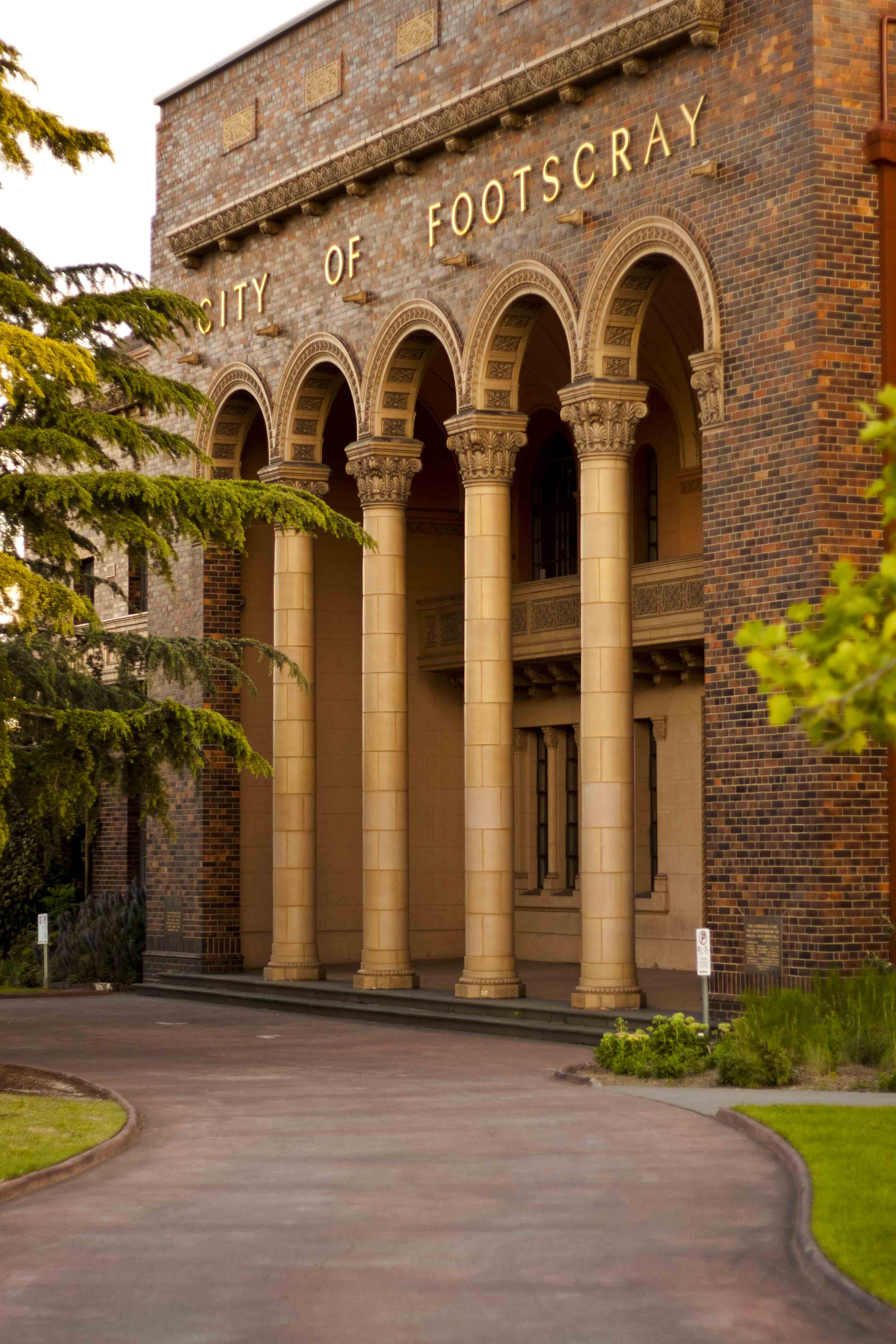
- City of Footscray building, located corner of Napier and Hyde Street in Footscray

- The extent of the City of Footscray at its dissolution in 1994
- Country: Australia
- State: Victoria
- Region: Western Melbourne
- Established: 1859
- Council seat: Footscray

Area
  - Total: 17.10 km^{2} (6.60 sq mi)

Population
  - Total(s): 47,900 (1992)
  - Density: 2,801/km^{2} (7,255/sq mi)
- County: Bourke
LGAs around City of Footscray
Sunshine	Essendon	Melbourne
Sunshine	City of Footscray	Melbourne
Altona	Williamstown	Port Melbourne

The City of Footscray was a local government area about 5 kilometres (3 mi) west of Melbourne, the state capital of Victoria, Australia. The city covered an area of 17.10 square kilometres (6.60 sq mi) and existed from 1859 until 1994. Its civic centre, after which it was named, was Footscray.

== History ==
Footscray was first incorporated as a municipality on 10 June 1859, and was made a borough in 1863. It became a town on 25 February 1887, and was proclaimed a city on 23 January 1891. On 6 January 1922 and 5 February 1941, Footscray annexed land previously part of the Shire of Werribee, which became the West Ward (later to be known as Kingsville Ward). Further additions to this ward were made at the expense of the City of Williamstown, on 12 May 1943.

On 15 December 1994, the City of Footscray was abolished, and along with parts of the City of Sunshine, was merged into the newly created City of Maribyrnong. The only exception was the suburb of South Kingsville, which was transferred to the City of Hobsons Bay.

== Wards ==
At dissolution, the City of Footscray was divided into four wards, each electing three councillors:

- North West Ward
- North Ward
- South Ward
- Kingsville Ward (formerly West Ward)

Prior to the 1988 elections, an additional Middle Ward existed.

== Suburbs ==
- Footscray*
- Kingsville
- Maribyrnong (shared with the City of Sunshine)
- Seddon
- South Kingsville
- Spotswood (shared with the City of Williamstown)
- West Footscray
- Yarraville
- Maidstone

* Council seat.

== Population ==
Year	Population
1954	57,915
1958	61,700*
1961	60,734
1966	58,666
1971	57,810
1976	51,635
1981	49,756
1986	47,330
1991	46,844

* Estimate in the 1958 Victorian Year Book.
