= Spotswood, Victoria =

Spotswood
- Suburb
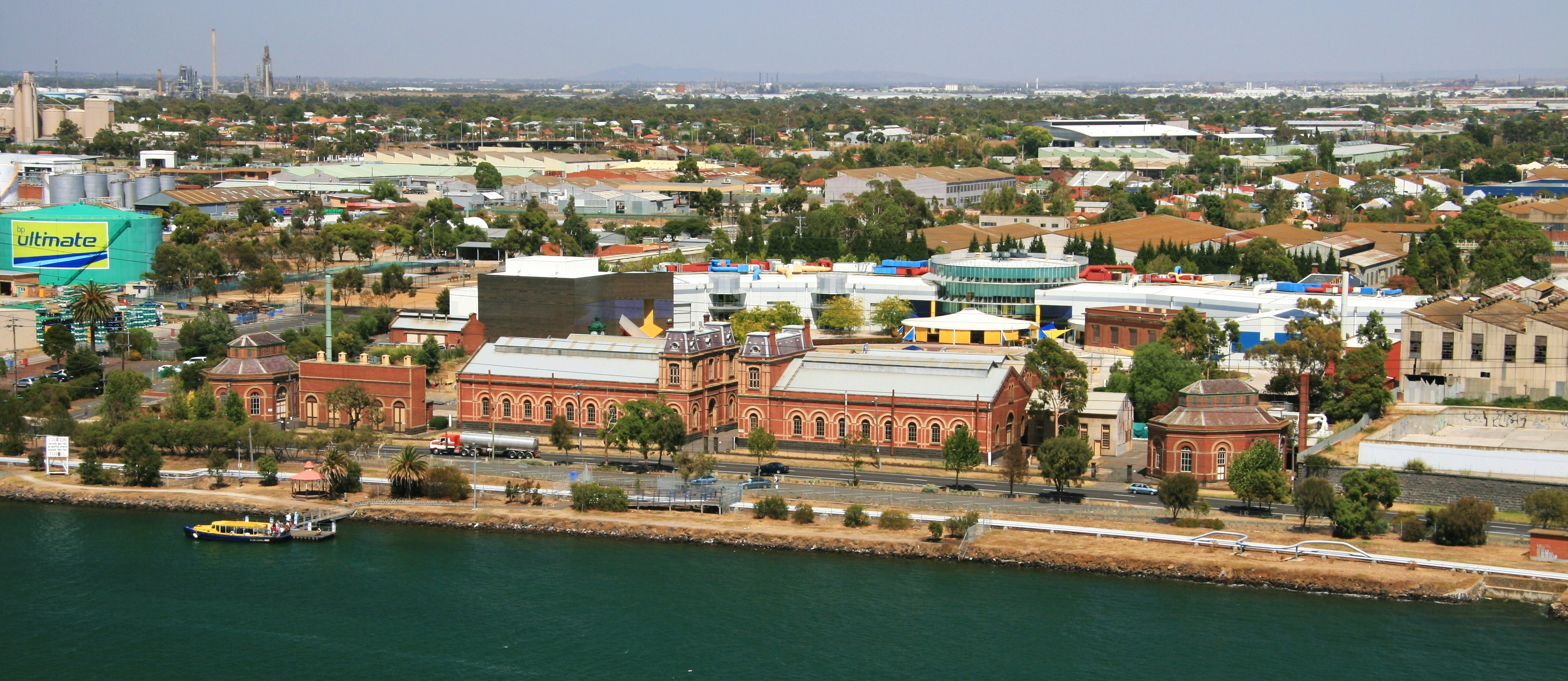
- View of Spotswood from Westgate Bridge

- Interactive map of Spotswood
- Coordinates: 37.831°S 144.887°E
- Country: Australia
- State: Victoria
- City: Melbourne
- LGA: City of Hobsons Bay
- Location: 7 km (4.3 mi) from Melbourne

Government
  - State electorate: Williamstown
  - Federal division: Fraser

Area
  - Total: 3.1 km^{2} (1.2 sq mi)
- Elevation: 18 m (59 ft)

Population
  - Total: 2,820 (2021 census)
  - Density: 910/km^{2} (2,360/sq mi)
- Postcode: 3015
Suburbs around Spotswood
Yarraville	Yarraville	Yarraville
South Kingsville	Spotswood	Port Melbourne
Newport	Newport	Newport

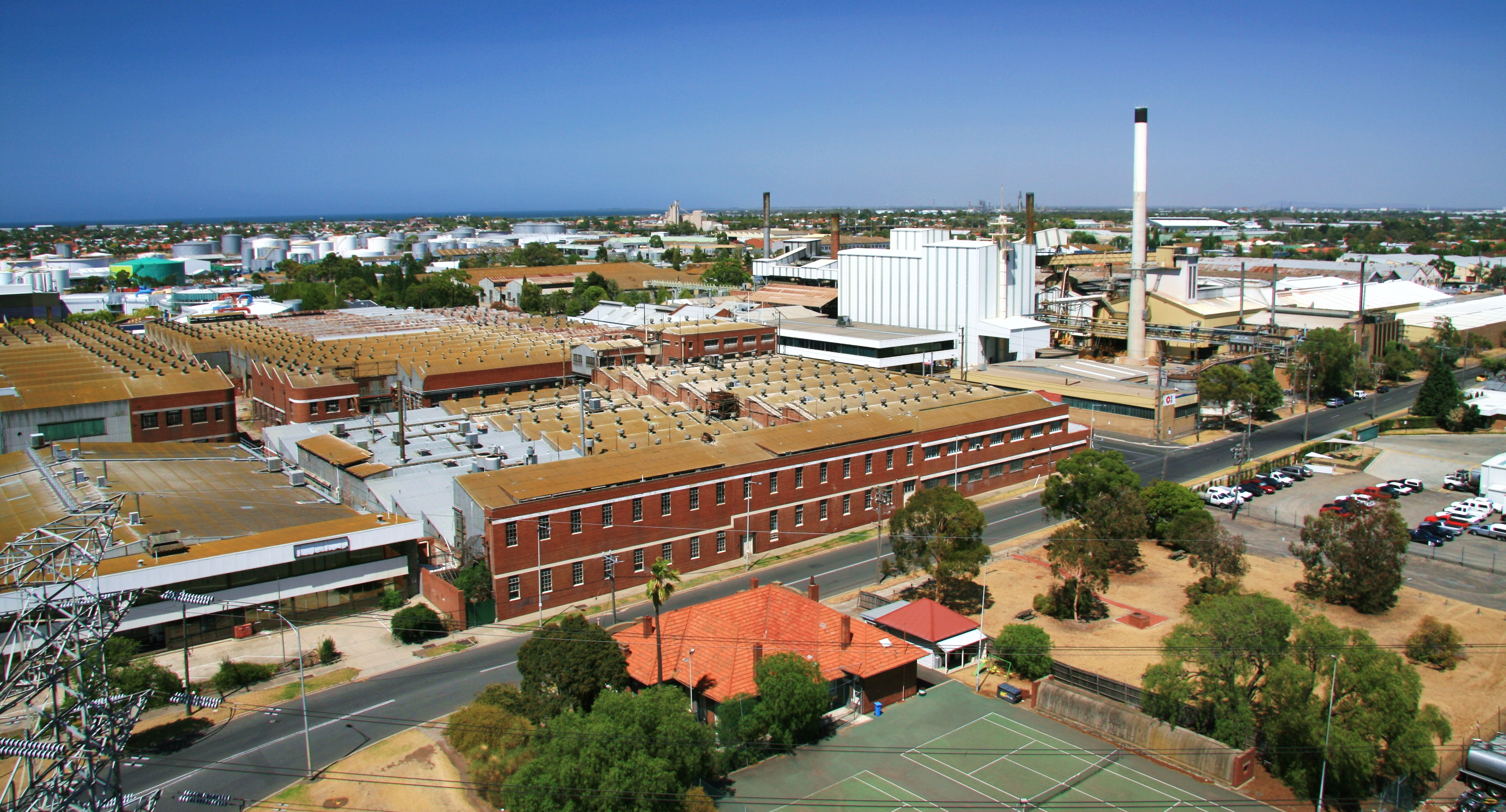
Overview of the industrial area below the West Gate Bridge

Spotswood is an inner suburb in Melbourne, Victoria, Australia, 7 km (4.3 mi) south-west of Melbourne's Central Business District, located within the City of Hobsons Bay local government area. Spotswood recorded a population of 2,820 at the 2021 census.

The suburb is bounded by the Newport–Sunshine freight railway line in the west, the West Gate Freeway in the north, the Yarra River in the east and the Burleigh Street in the south.

Spotswood was named after John Stewart Spotswood, who was one of the first farmers who owned much of the area in the 1840s.

== History ==
Spottiswoode Post Office opened on 1 February 1882 and was renamed Spottiswood around 1903 and Spotswood around 1906.

== Locality ==
Spotswood is known for the Victorian Science Museum, known as Scienceworks. Scienceworks is near the old sewage pumping station of Spotswood, constructed in 1897. This location was also used as the police headquarters in Mad Max and for the Academy Award-winning short film Harvie Krumpet.

== Film ==
Spotswood was the setting of the eponymous Australian film, Spotswood, made in 1990–1991, released in 1992, starring Anthony Hopkins. Most of the scenes in Spotswood were shot in the suburb, but the moccasin factory is fictional and doesn't exist in Spotswood; the factory scenes in the movie were shot in the old sewage pumping station. Moccasins are a derogatory stereotype for the western suburbs of Melbourne; implying a lack of class, culture and sophistication even though they are commonly used elsewhere in Australia. The suburb was the main location in the clay animation short-film Harvie Krumpet.

== Transport ==
Spotswood railway station is served by train services on the Werribee and Williamstown lines. Several bus routes also traverse the suburb.

== Sport ==
The suburb has an Australian Rules football team the Spotswood Football Club competing in the Western Region Football League. The Spotswood Cricket Club also plays at McLean Reserve and competes in the Victorian Sub District Cricket Association. Golfers play at the course of the Westgate Golf Club on Creek Street.

== See also ==
- City of Footscray – Parts of Spotswood were previously within this former local government area.
- City of Williamstown – Parts of Spotswood were previously within this former local government area.
