= City of Altona =

Coordinates: 37°52′05″S 144°49′48″E

City of Altona Victoria
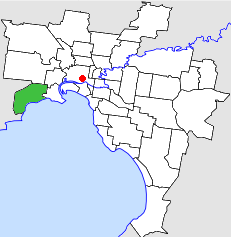
- Location in Melbourne
- The extent of the City of Altona at its dissolution in 1994
- Population: 35,900 (1992)
  - Density: 893.5/km^{2} (2,314/sq mi)
- Established: 1957
- Area: 40.18 km^{2} (15.5 sq mi)
- Council seat: Altona
- Region: Southwestern Melbourne
- County: Bourke
LGAs around City of Altona:
Werribee	Sunshine	Footscray
Werribee	City of Altona	Williamstown
Werribee	Port Phillip	Port Phillip

The City of Altona was a local government area about 13 kilometres (8 mi) west of Melbourne, the state capital of Victoria, Australia. The city covered an area of 40.18 square kilometres (15.51 sq mi), and existed from 1957 until 1994.

== History ==
The city was named after the town of Altona near Hamburg, Germany, in 1844 by Robert Wrede, a pastoralist and early settler. Land in the area was first incorporated as part of the Wyndham Road District on 6 October 1862, which became the Shire of Wyndham on 7 March 1864, and was renamed the Shire of Werribee on 15 December 1909.

On 20 February 1957, the Altona Riding of the Shire of Werribee was severed, and incorporated as the Shire of Altona, which was proclaimed by the Governor of Victoria on 29 May 1957, with nine councillors. It was declared a city on 21 December 1968. Only two changes occurred to Altona's boundaries; in 1958, a 4.05-hectare (10.0-acre) reserve at Laverton was annexed to Werribee, while 83 hectares (205 acres) in the east was severed and annexed to the City of Williamstown.

On 22 June 1994, the City of Altona was abolished, and along with the City of Williamstown and a couple of small neighbouring areas, was merged into the newly created City of Hobsons Bay.

Council met at the Altona Civic Centre, near the intersection of Civic Parade and Pier Street, Altona. The facility is still used for council meetings by the City of Hobsons Bay.

== Wards ==
Altona was the only municipality in Metropolitan Melbourne never to be subdivided. The council consisted of nine councillors, who represented the entire area.

== Suburbs ==
- Altona*
- Altona Meadows (shared with the City of Werribee)
- Altona North

* Council seat.

== Population ==
Year	Population
1954	6,300#
1958	9,500*
1961	15,811
1966	24,984
1971	30,589
1976	30,272
1981	30,909
1986	32,838
1991	34,492

* Estimate in the 1958 Victorian Year Book.
# As the Shire of Altona was created in 1957, this figure is an estimate only. Source: 1958 Victorian Year Book.
