= Altona =

Altona may refer to:

== Places ==
=== Australia ===
- Altona Beach, in Altona, Victoria, Australia
- Altona Meadows, Victoria, Australia
- Altona North, Victoria, Australia
- Altona, Victoria, a suburb of Melbourne, Australia
  - Altona railway station
  - Altona Refinery
- City of Altona, west of Melbourne
- Electoral district of Altona, a former electoral district in Victoria, Australia

=== Canada ===
- Altona, Manitoba, Canada
- Altona, Ontario, Canada

=== Germany ===
- Altona, Hamburg, borough of Hamburg
  - Altona-Altstadt, district of Hamburg, center of the historic city Altona
  - Hamburg-Altona station
  - Hamburg-Altona link line
  - Hamburg-Altona (electoral district)

=== United States ===
- Altona, Colorado
- Altona, Illinois
- Altona, Indiana
- Altona, Michigan
- Altona, Missouri
- Altona, Nebraska
- Altona, New York, a town in Clinton County
  - Altona (CDP), New York, within the town of Altona
- Altonah, Utah, also spelled Altona
- Altona (West Virginia), a historic farm near Charles Town
- Altona, Saint Croix, United States Virgin Islands
- Altona, Saint Thomas, United States Virgin Islands
- Altona, now New Holstein, Wisconsin

== Other uses ==
- 850 Altona, a minor planet in the Solar System
- Altona (sternwheeler), a steamboat on the Willamette River in Oregon, 1890
- MCP Altona, a container ship
- SS Altona (1877), a freighter

== See also ==
- Altenahr
- Altonah (disambiguation)
- Altoona (disambiguation)
- Altuna (disambiguation)
- Hamburg-Altona (disambiguation)
