= City of Hobsons Bay =

Coordinates: 37°51′S 144°50′E

- Local government area
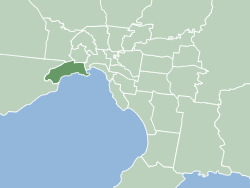
- Location within Melbourne metropolitan area

- Interactive map of City of Hobsons Bay
- Country: Australia
- State: Victoria
- Region: Greater Melbourne
- Established: June 1994
- Council seat: Altona

Government
  - Mayor: Daria Kellander
  - State electorates: Laverton; Point Cook; Williamstown
  - Federal divisions: Fraser; Gellibrand

Area
  - Total: 64 km^{2} (25 sq mi)

Population
  - Total: 96,470 (2018)
  - Density: 1,507/km^{2} (3,904/sq mi)
- Website: City of Hobsons Bay
LGAs around City of Hobsons Bay
Brimbank, Wyndham	Maribyrnong	Melbourne
Wyndham	City of Hobsons Bay	Melbourne, Port Phillip
Wyndham	Port Phillip	Port Phillip

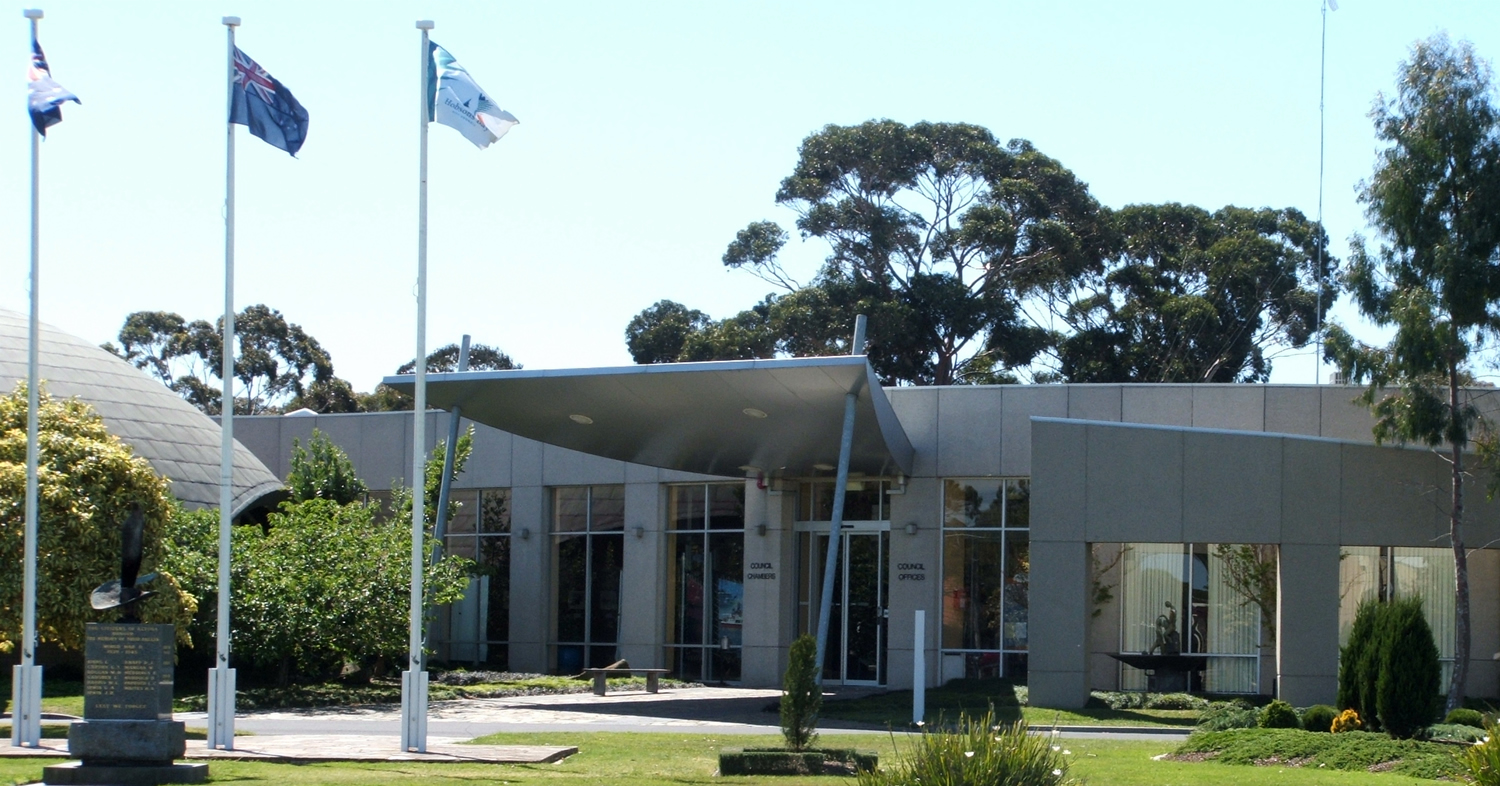
Hobsons Bay council chambers in Altona

The City of Hobsons Bay is a local government area in Melbourne, Victoria, Australia. It comprises the south-western suburbs between 6 and 20 km from the Melbourne city centre.

It takes its name from Hobsons Bay, the water body off the east coast of the LGA, named after Captain William Hobson. The city has an area of 64 square kilometres, and in June 2018 had a population of 96,470.

== History ==
The City of Hobsons Bay was founded on 22 June 1994 from the amalgamation of the City of Williamstown, the City of Altona (including an industrial area that it had gained from the City of Sunshine less than 12 months earlier), the suburb of South Kingsville from the City of Footscray, and the suburbs of Laverton, Seabrook and the western part of Altona Meadows from the City of Werribee.

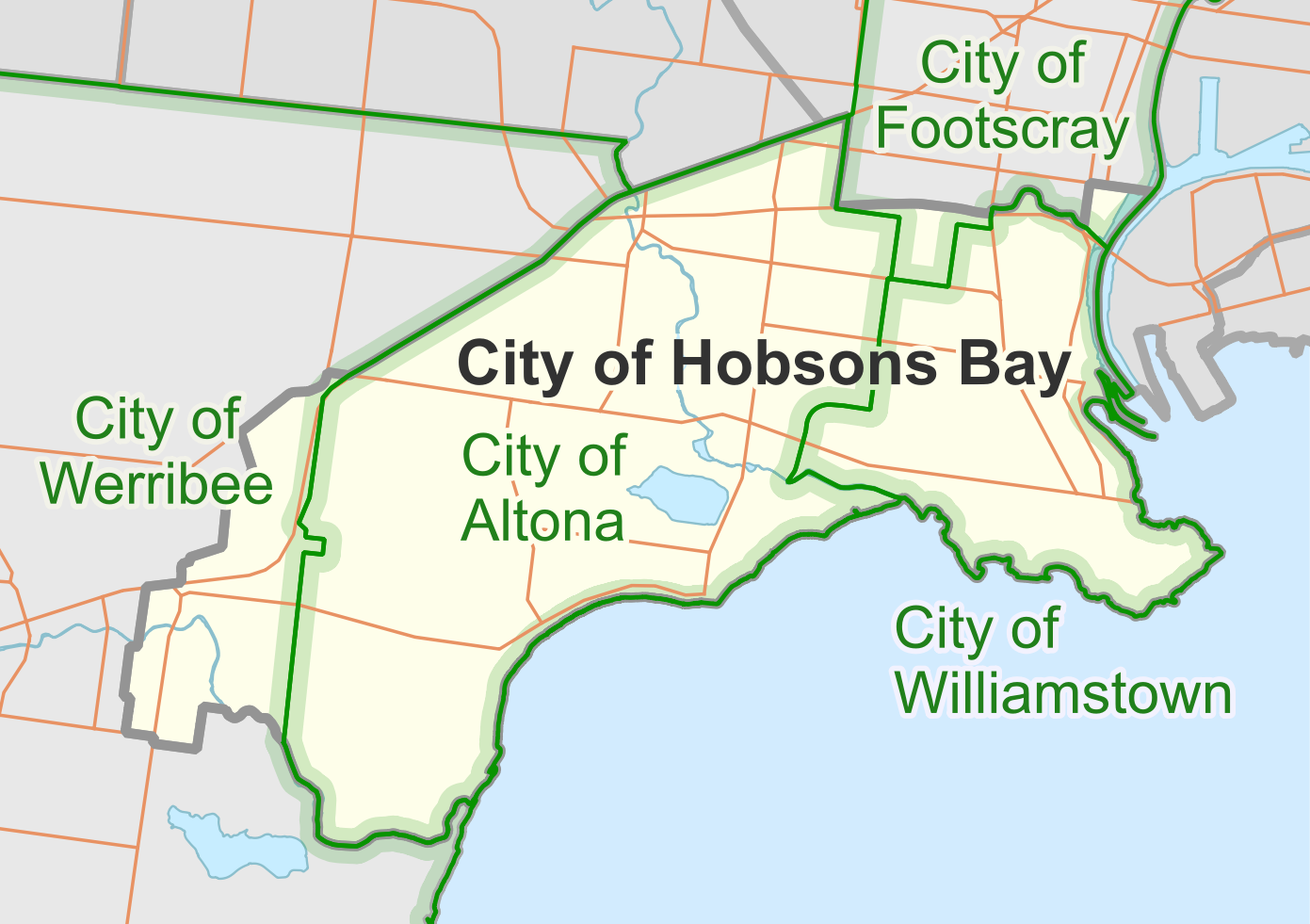
The City of Hobsons Bay's predecessor LGAs (green) as they were in 1994

== Council ==
Starting with the 2024 election, Hobsons Bay has been restructured into seven single-member wards, with each councillor elected through preferential voting. Previously, councillors were chosen from three multi-member wards.

The councillors currently serving as of the 2024 election are:

Ward	Party	Councillor	Notes
Altona	Independent	Daria Kellander	Mayor 2024–2025
Altona Meadows	Independent	Diana Grima	Mayor 2025–present
Altona North	Independent Labor	Rayane Hawli	Deputy Mayor 2024–2025
Laverton	Independent Labor	Paddy Keys-Macpherson	
Spotswood	Independent	Kristin Bishop	
Williamstown	Independent	Lisa Bentley	Deputy Mayor 2025–present
Williamstown North	Independent	Michael Disbury	

== Education ==
=== Libraries ===
The library, run by the council has five branches: Altona, Altona Meadows, Altona North, Newport and Williamstown. Reflecting the multiculturalism of the community, the library service has a large amount of material in eight different languages.

The Environment Resource Centre is located in Altona library and provides the community access to resources concerning the environment, including initiatives and environmental groups in Hobsons Bay.

== Transport ==
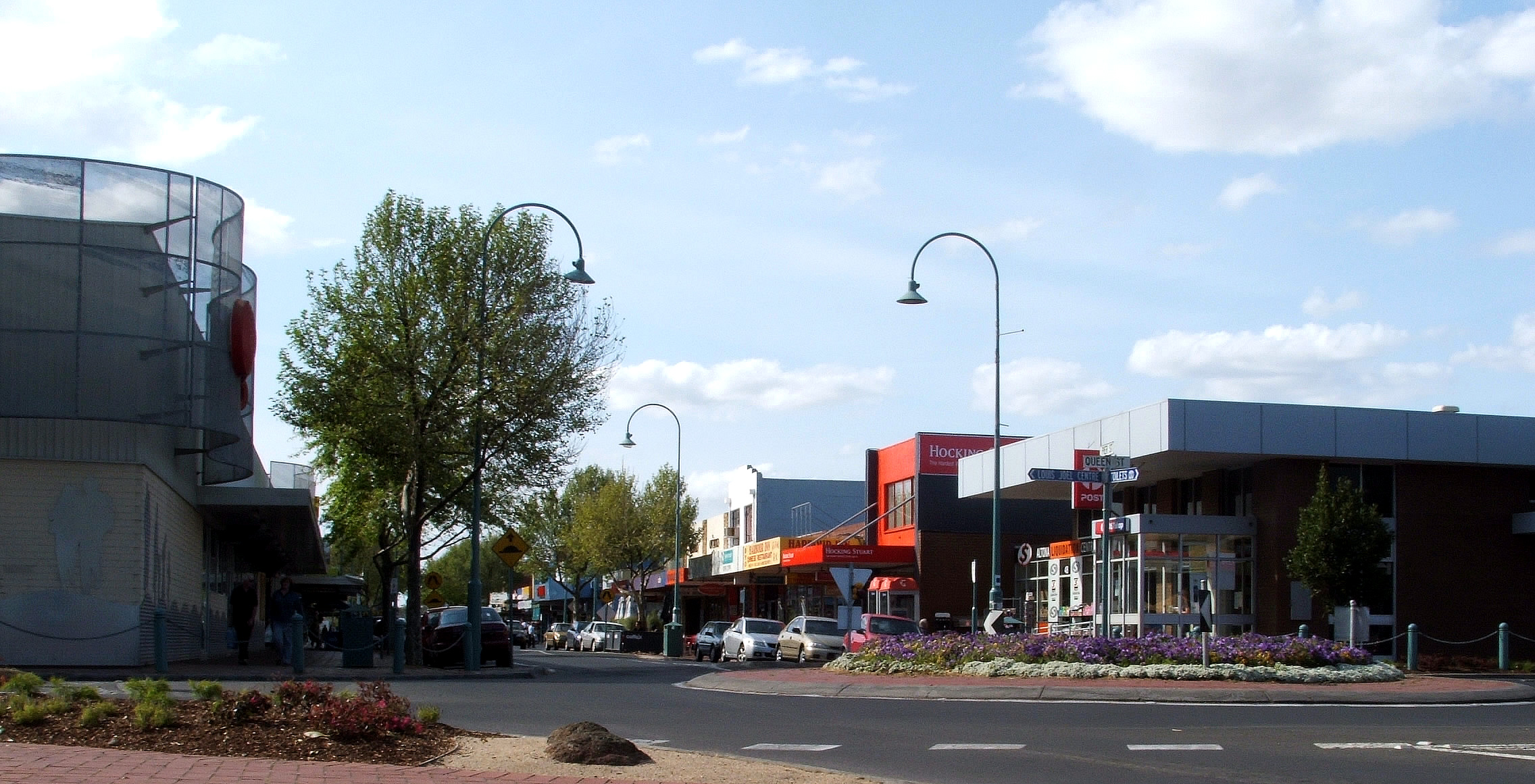
Pier Street, Altona

=== Suburban railway ===
Hobsons Bay has seven train stations on the Werribee railway line, in PTV Zones 1 and 2. These stations are Spotswood, Newport, Seaholme, Altona, Westona, Laverton and Aircraft. Previously on this line were the stations of Mobiltown, Paisley, and Galvin.

Williamstown railway line is another service which runs through Hobsons Bay. It departs the Werribee railway line at Newport and visits the stations of North Williamstown, Williamstown Beach, and Williamstown.

=== Freeways ===
The interchange between the West Gate Freeway, Western Ring Road and Princes Freeway lies in the north-west of Hobsons Bay.

From Hobsons Bay, the West Gate Freeway provides access to the Melbourne CBD and eastern suburbs (over the iconic West Gate Bridge), the Princes Freeway provides access to outer south-western suburbs and Geelong, while the Western Ring Road leads to the northern suburbs and Melbourne Airport.

== Townships and localities ==
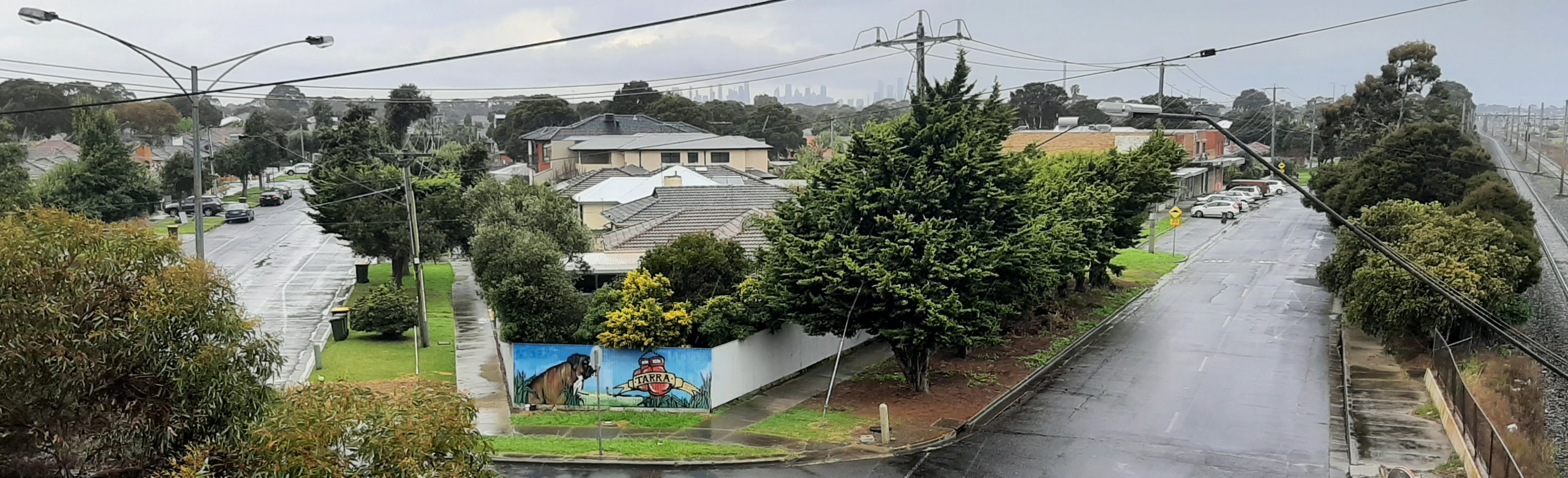
Suburban streets of Altona North

The 2021 census, the city had a population of 91,322 up from 88,778 in the 2016 census

Population
Locality	2016	2021
Altona	10,762	11,490
Altona Meadows	19,160	18,479
Altona North	12,152	12,962
Brooklyn^	1,856	1,979
Laverton^	4,915	4,760
Newport	12,916	13,658
Seabrook	5,124	4,952
Seaholme	1,928	2,067
South Kingsville	1,947	2,156
Spotswood	2,604	2,820
Williamstown	13,969	14,407
Williamstown North	1,593	1,622

^ - Territory divided with another LGA

== Sister cities ==
- Anjo, Aichi, Japan
- Shire of Buloke, Victoria, Australia (friendship alliance)

== See also ==
- List of places on the Victorian Heritage Register in the City of Hobsons Bay
- List of Melbourne suburbs
