= Altona, U.S. Virgin Islands =

Altona, U.S. Virgin Islands may refer to:

- Altona, Saint Croix, U.S. Virgin Islands
- Altona, Saint Thomas, U.S. Virgin Islands
