= Laverton, Victoria =

Laverton
- Suburb
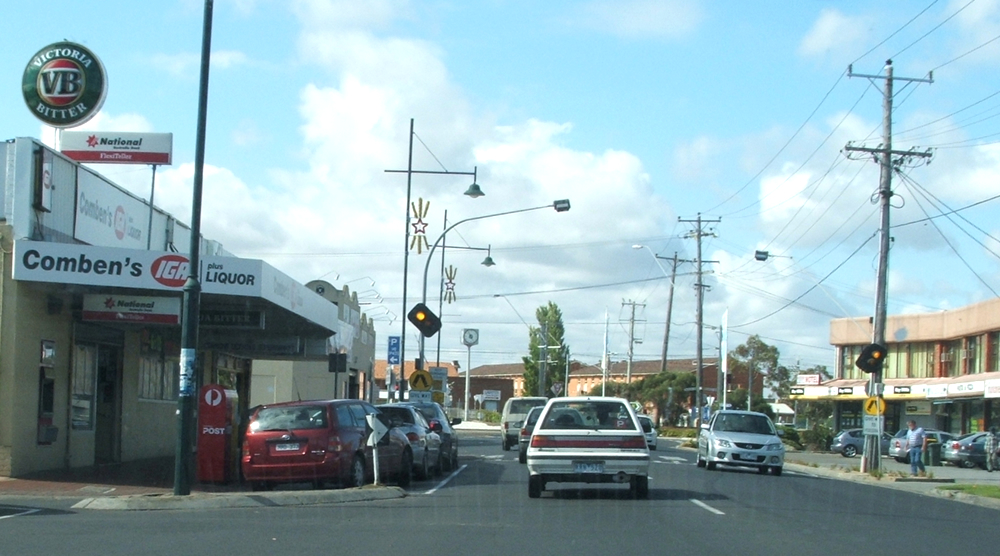
- Aviation Road, main street of Laverton

- Interactive map of Laverton
- Coordinates: 37.858°S 144.773°E
- Country: Australia
- State: Victoria
- City: Melbourne
- LGAs: City of Hobsons Bay; City of Wyndham
- Location: 17.5 km (10.9 mi) from Melbourne

Government
  - State electorate: Laverton
  - Federal division: Gellibrand

Area
  - Total: 6.8 km^{2} (2.6 sq mi)
- Elevation: 12 m (39 ft)

Population
  - Total: 4,760 (2021 census)
  - Density: 700/km^{2} (1,813/sq mi)
- Postcode: 3028
- Mean max temp: 19.8 °C (67.6 °F)
- Mean min temp: 9.4 °C (48.9 °F)
- Annual rainfall: 534.2 mm (21.03 in)
Suburbs around Laverton
Truganina	Laverton North	Altona North
Williams Landing	Laverton	Altona Meadows
Point Cook	Seabrook	Altona Meadows

Laverton established in 1886, is a suburb of Melbourne, Victoria, Australia, 17 km (11 mi) south-west of Melbourne's Central Business District, located within the Cities of Hobsons Bay and Wyndham local government areas. Laverton recorded a population of 4,760 at the 2021 census.

It was home to the RAAF Base (RAAF Williams), and covers 148 ha (0.57 sq mi) in the suburb of Laverton. Laverton was originally established to support the greater rate of flying and maintenance activities after the formation of the RAAF in 1921. Many homes in the surrounding area were colloquially called the “cabbage patch”, in reference to the boom of young families after the return of soldiers from WWII. Fences in the area also used to be low (below 1 m (3.3 ft)) to originally form a shared community with no fence at the front. This style has recently been changed particularly on the main arterials throughout Laverton with higher fences being built in line with local council building policies. The military airfield at RAAF Williams, Laverton was decommissioned and has now been developed into a new suburb – Williams Landing.

The Laverton base and airfield was established by the Royal Australian Air Force on 01 March 1926, and is the third oldest RAAF base in Australia. Home to No. 1 Aircraft Depot between 1926 and 1994, Laverton has also housed flying units, Support and Training Command Headquarters, No. 6 RAAF Hospital and training and administrative functions. The airfield was officially closed in 1996 and subsequently sold for suburban housing development.

Laverton Swim and Fitness Centre (LSFC), originally called Laverton Memorial Swimming Pool, was proudly funded by the residents and Werribee Shire council (who owned the suburb of Laverton prior to 2014 handover to Hobsons Bay City Council). It opened in June 1976 and was dedicated to those who had served in various conflicts in which Australia had been involved. A WWII memorial plaque was installed, however removed or possibly stolen and is to be replaced with an identical plaque in 2022. A petition was launched by Laverton Residents in 2020, in support by Wetlands Ward Councillors as part of their campaign to be voted in, however a decision by the previous council in 2021 was made to close the pool, supported by the Wetlands Ward councillors in 2022, to instead build a new state-of-the-art pool in the neighbouring suburb of Altona Meadows for $60m as part of the Western Aquatic Strategy 2019-2030. The feasibility of this project to break ground at the new site of Bruce Comben Reserve, Altona Meadows - is to be reviewed by February 2023.

Other notable Laverton facilities are the Woods Street Art Space, The Hub community Centre and many up and coming new restaurants and cafes with upgrades planned to support the growth of the suburb (7,500 by 2031 up from approximately 4,700 as per 2021 census).

Laverton is home to the Melbourne Ballpark state baseball stadium, which hosts several national events each year, including home games of the Melbourne aces who compete in the Australian Baseball League. The facility resides on what is known as the Altona Meadows side of the M1 freeway.

Laverton is connected to the Werribee railway line at Laverton station and Aircraft station.

Laverton is serviced by a network of primary and secondary state arterial roads, including major arterials such as the Princes Freeway, where there is an entry ramp via Point Cook Road (Aviation Road), and 5 exits into and out of Laverton.

Replacement of the railway crossing with a bridge at Aircraft station was finished in 2019 and future potential works to reroute traffic from and to Point Cook Road, which is predominantly used by city bound Point Cook residents travelling by vehicle.

== History ==
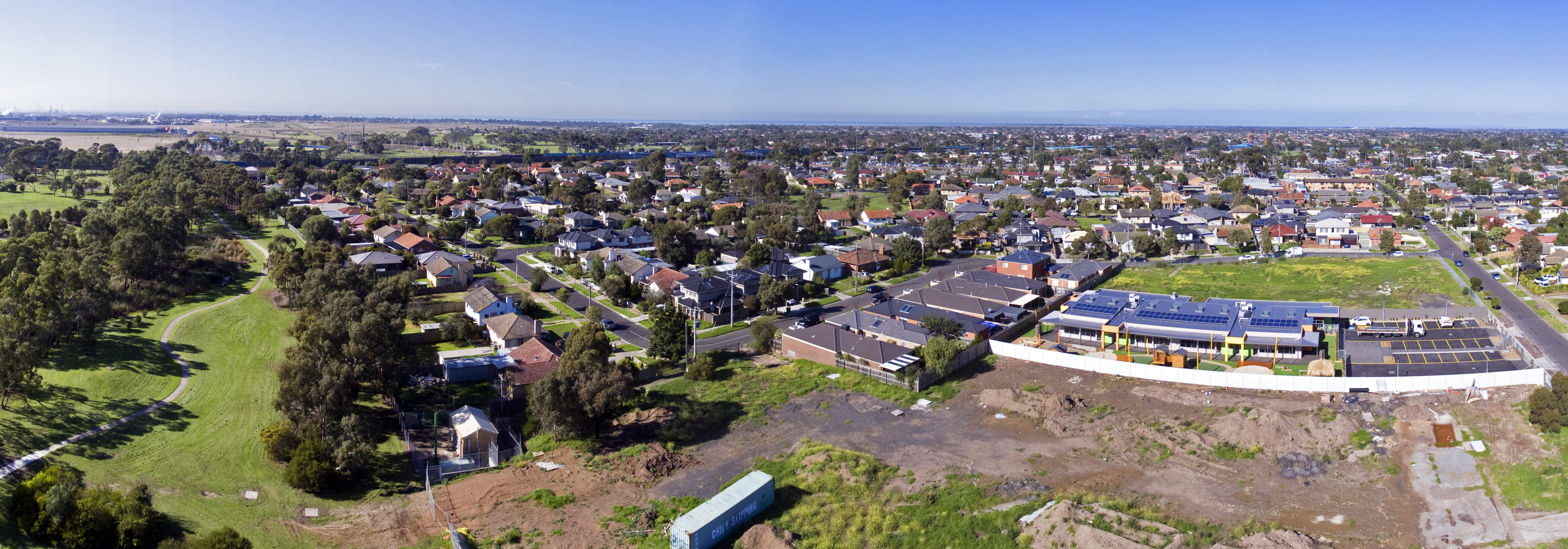
Aerial panorama of Laverton, Victoria facing south, 2017

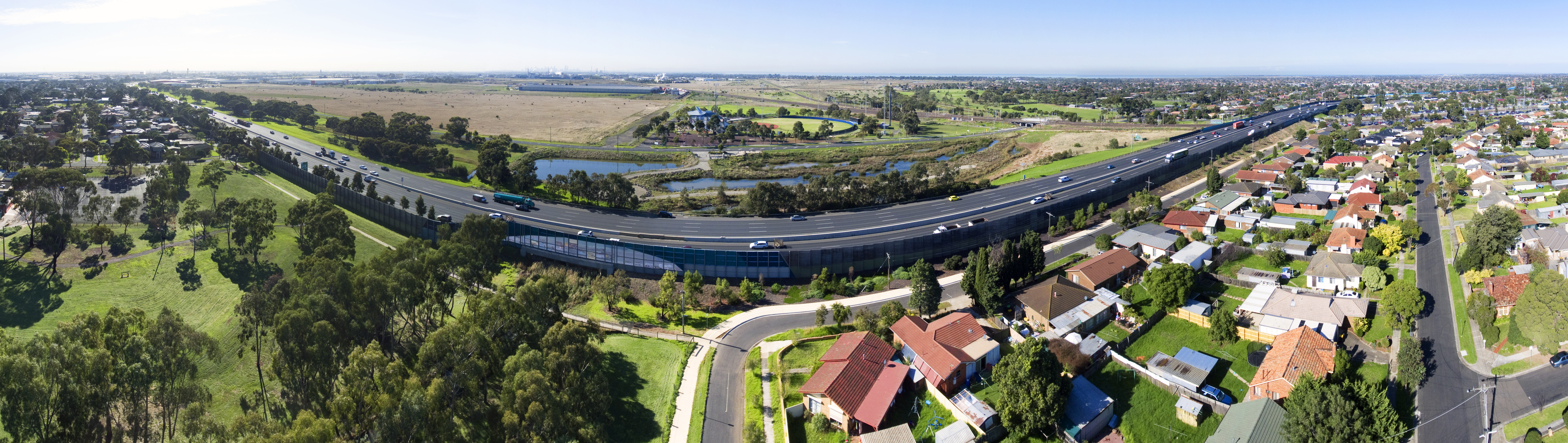
Aerial panorama of the M1 freeway along Laverton's southern perimeter, 2017

Laverton's history starts in 1886 when the sale of land in the area was promoted by Staples, Wise and Company. Laverton station was opened in the same year, becoming the first station between Newport and Werribee on the Geelong railway line. Laverton post office opened on 9 April 1888.

A kilometre further down the line Aircraft station, originally called Aircraft Siding, was opened in 1927, named for the adjacent RAAF base, which had opened in 1921, seven years after an RAAF base had been established at Point Cook, eight kilometres south.

In the 1950s, a second primary school was built in Laverton, having over 900 students by 1966. Two more primary schools and a high school were established around that time. There is a police station near Laverton railway station.

In 1959, the Victorian Housing Commission acquired large parcel of land to build houses for staff working at the RAAF base, leading to further population growth. More schools were opened and a shopping strip developed near Laverton station.

== Climate ==
Laverton possesses an oceanic climate (Köppen: Cfb). The town experiences warm summers and cool winters. Average maxima vary from 25.8 °C (78.4 °F) in January to 13.8 °C (56.8 °F) in July, while average minima fluctuate between 14.3 °C (57.7 °F) in February and 5.2 °C (41.4 °F) in July. Precipitation is moderately low, averaging 534.2 mm (21.03 in) per annum. However, rainfall is quite frequent (particularly in winter), and is spread across 143.1 precipitation days. The suburb of Laverton is not particularly sunny, experiencing 166.7 cloudy days and only 45.6 clear days per annum. Extreme temperatures have ranged from 47.5 °C (117.5 °F) on 7 February 2009 to −4.4 °C (24.1 °F) on 15 July 1984.

Climate data for Laverton (RAAF Williams) (37.86°S 144.76°E, 20 m (66 ft) AMSL) (1941-2024 normals & extremes)
Month	Jan	Feb	Mar	Apr	May	Jun	Jul	Aug	Sep	Oct	Nov	Dec	Year
Record high °C (°F)	45.0 (113.0)	47.5 (117.5)	41.4 (106.5)	35.5 (95.9)	27.3 (81.1)	24.3 (75.7)	23.5 (74.3)	26.8 (80.2)	31.3 (88.3)	37.2 (99.0)	42.4 (108.3)	45.2 (113.4)	47.5 (117.5)
Mean daily maximum °C (°F)	25.8 (78.4)	25.6 (78.1)	23.8 (74.8)	20.3 (68.5)	16.9 (62.4)	14.2 (57.6)	13.8 (56.8)	15.0 (59.0)	17.1 (62.8)	19.4 (66.9)	21.6 (70.9)	23.9 (75.0)	19.8 (67.6)
Mean daily minimum °C (°F)	14.0 (57.2)	14.3 (57.7)	12.7 (54.9)	10.0 (50.0)	7.8 (46.0)	5.9 (42.6)	5.2 (41.4)	5.7 (42.3)	6.8 (44.2)	8.4 (47.1)	10.3 (50.5)	12.1 (53.8)	9.4 (49.0)
Record low °C (°F)	5.2 (41.4)	5.0 (41.0)	2.7 (36.9)	0.3 (32.5)	−0.9 (30.4)	−3.3 (26.1)	−4.4 (24.1)	−3.7 (25.3)	−1.7 (28.9)	−1.0 (30.2)	0.8 (33.4)	3.6 (38.5)	−4.4 (24.1)
Average precipitation mm (inches)	41.4 (1.63)	43.4 (1.71)	34.2 (1.35)	45.8 (1.80)	45.5 (1.79)	38.0 (1.50)	37.9 (1.49)	44.0 (1.73)	47.6 (1.87)	56.2 (2.21)	53.8 (2.12)	46.5 (1.83)	534.2 (21.03)
Average precipitation days (≥ 0.2 mm)	7.4	6.9	8.6	10.8	13.8	14.2	15.4	15.7	14.6	14.0	11.9	9.8	143.1
Average afternoon relative humidity (%)	48	50	51	55	62	67	64	61	58	55	53	50	56
Average dew point °C (°F)	11.0 (51.8)	11.9 (53.4)	10.7 (51.3)	9.1 (48.4)	8.3 (46.9)	7.1 (44.8)	5.9 (42.6)	5.9 (42.6)	6.7 (44.1)	7.8 (46.0)	8.9 (48.0)	9.7 (49.5)	8.6 (47.5)
Mean monthly sunshine hours	263.5	234.5	207.7	171.0	133.3	123.0	139.5	161.2	171.0	210.8	222.0	248.0	2,285.5
Percentage possible sunshine	59	61	54	51	43	43	46	49	48	52	52	54	51
Source: Bureau of Meteorology (1941-2024 normals & extremes)

== Demographics ==
In the 2011 census, the population of Laverton was 4,065, approximately 47.4% female and 52.6% male. The median/average age of the people in Laverton is 31 years of age.

47.1% of people living in the suburb of Laverton were born in Australia. The other top responses for country of birth were 14.0% India, 4.7% Burma, 2.6% Philippines, 2.4% New Zealand, 2.4% England, 2.3% Thailand, 1.6% China, 1.5% Vietnam, 0.8% Scotland, 0.5% Nepal, 0.5% Cambodia, 0.5% Sudan, 0.5% Italy, 0.5% Ethiopia.

51.7% of people living in Laverton speak English only. The other top languages spoken are 12.7% Other, 7.9% Punjabi, 5.5% Language spoken at home not stated, 2.8% Hindi, 1.9% Arabic, 1.8% Other, 1.8% Vietnamese, 1.4% Mandarin, 1.3% Spanish.

The religious makeup of Laverton is 22.8% Catholic, 17.9% No religion, 8.5% Anglican, 8.3% Religious affiliation not stated, 7.7% Other Religious Groups, 7.6% Baptist, 6.8% Hinduism, 3.7% Islam, 3.2% Buddhism, 2.8% Eastern Orthodox.

== Transport ==
=== Train ===
Laverton is home to two train stations; Aircraft Station and Laverton Station, both of which are serviced by trains on the Werribee railway line.

=== Bus ===
Laverton is serviced by nine bus routes:

- Route 400: Sunshine Station to Laverton Station
- Route 411: Laverton Station to Footscray (via Altona Meadows and Altona)
- Route 412: Laverton Station to Footscray (via Altona Meadows and Altona)
- Route 414: Laverton Station to Footscray
- Route 415: Laverton Station to Williamstown (via Altona)
- Route 417: Laverton Station to Laverton Station (via Laverton North)
- Route 496: Laverton Station to Sanctuary Lakes
- Route 498: Laverton Station to Hoppers Crossing Station
- Route 903: Altona to Mordialloc (SMARTBUS Service)

== Royal Australian Air Force bases ==
Laverton was the home to RAAF Base Laverton. The base is no longer used for operational flying. In 2008 the base became part of the new suburb of Williams Landing. For administrative purposes, it is now merged with the former RAAF Base Point Cook as RAAF Base Williams. Point Cook is home to the RAAF Museum, where visitors can see many different types of historical RAAF aircraft. RAAF Williams is also home to the Laverton depot of the Australian Army Reserves 8/7 Battalion of the Royal Victorian Regiment.

== Scouts ==
Laverton was home to the 1st Laverton Air Scout group which began in approximately 1952. In the past, it was an active 'Air Scout' Group given the local RAAF base. The group currently has Joey Scouts, Cub Scouts and Scouts. It met in a hall on railway land near the Laverton railway station. This hall was also used by local sports clubs and gets hired out for parties. 1st Laverton Scout Group has been dissolved and permanently closed.

Laverton was also home to 2nd Laverton Scout Group, which began in 1970. This group has a hall at Lawrie Emmins Reserve and since 2014, hasn't been 2nd Laverton, they became Williams. Williams is a smaller, lesser known group with a lot less members than other Scout Groups in Werribee Plains District.

== Sport ==
The suburb has an Australian rules football team (Laverton Magpies) competing in the Western Region Football League.

The Laverton Cricket Club is also based at Laverton Park. It currently has five senior teams and a large number of junior sides.

Golfers play at the course of the RAAF Williams Golf Club.

A skate park, based at McCormick Park, caters to skaters and BMX riders.

== See also ==
- City of Werribee – Laverton was previously within this former local government area.
