= Paisley railway station, Melbourne =

Former railway station in Victoria, Australia

Paisley
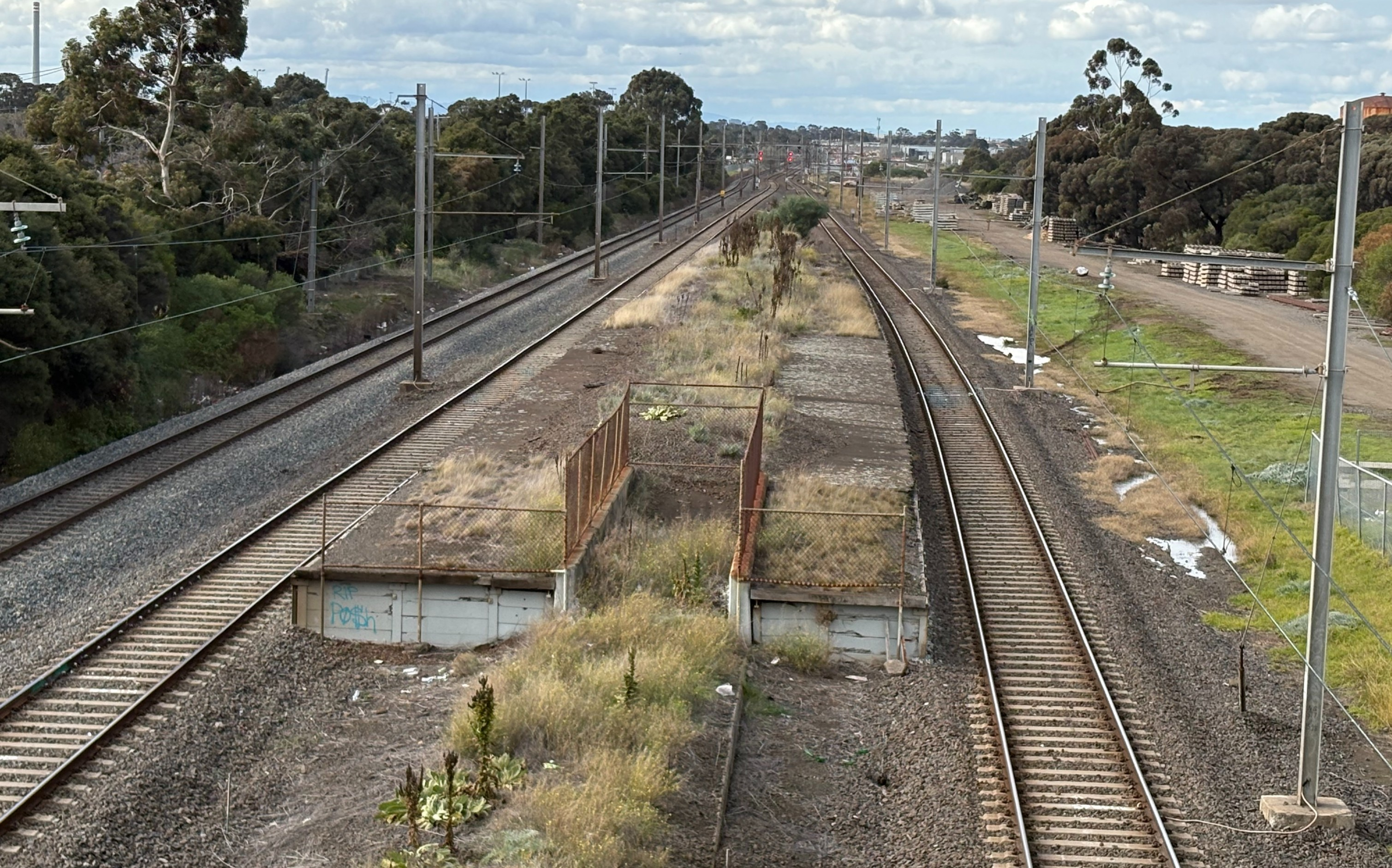
- Northeast-bound view of the platform in July 2025

General information
- Coordinates: 37.8466°S 144.8468°E
- System: Closed commuter rail station
- Line: Werribee
- Platforms: 2
- Tracks: 2

Other information
- Status: Closed
- Station code: PLY

History
- Opened: 14 October 1929; 96 years ago
- Closed: 14 April 1985; 41 years ago

Former services
Preceding station	MetRail	Following station
Newport towards Flinders Street	Werribee line	Galvin towards Werribee
List of closed railway stations in Melbourne
Location

Paisley is a disused railway station on the Werribee line, which is part of the Melbourne rail network. It was located between Newport and Galvin during operation, serving the suburb of Altona North.

== History ==
Paisley station opened on 14 October 1929. It was located adjacent to the Millers Road level crossing, which was replaced by a road overpass in 1973.

Although the Altona North area was sparsely populated at the time, it played an important role in serving two oil refineries in the area. The Standard Oil Platform (later renamed to Mobiltown) was opened in 1953 next to the Altona Refinery, providing a second railway station in the area.

When the line between Altona Junction and Laverton was duplicated in 1967, a new second track was built behind the existing station, converting it into an island platform. In 1975, a subway was also provided to allow passengers to get to the platform from the adjacent Ross Road.

=== Closure ===
In 1985, a new section of track was opened, joining Westona and Laverton stations. The Werribee line had been electrified two years earlier, but after the construction of the Westona–Laverton link, trains on the Werribee line were diverted via Altona and Westona in an attempt to make a more viable route (given that both Paisley and the nearby station of Galvin saw little use).

As a result, Paisley and Galvin were bypassed and closed, with the last trains stopping at Paisley on 14 April 1985. Mobiltown had closed three months earlier, leaving Altona North without a railway station. The Public Transport Users Association (PTUA) criticised the closure of both stations as "the left hand not knowing what the right hand was doing".

The pedestrian subway was filled in following the station's closure, but the island platform still exists, adjacent to the Millers Road overpass, and is visible from passing trains to Werribee.

In 1991, the car park for the former station was expanded to become the Altona North park and ride terminus for the Route 232 bus service to Melbourne via the Westgate Bridge.

As of 2026, the gap between the two nearest stations – Newport and Laverton – is the longest between any stations on the Melbourne rail network. There have been calls to rebuild Paisley or construct a new station in Altona North.

== See also ==
- List of closed railway stations in Melbourne
