= Altoona =

Altoona, a variant of "Altona", may refer to:

== Places in the United States ==
- Altoona, Pennsylvania, a city; the oldest and largest of these places, and namesake of most of the rest of this list
  - Altoona, Alabama, a town
  - Altoona, Florida, a census-designated place
  - Altoona, Iowa, a city
  - Altoona, Kansas, a city
  - Altoona, Ohio, an unincorporated community
  - Altoona, Washington, a census-designated place
  - Altoona, Wisconsin, a city

== Biology ==
- Altoona, a synonym of the moth genus Peoria (moth)

== See also ==
- Altona (disambiguation)
- Altuna (disambiguation)
