= Galvin railway station =

Former railway station in Victoria, Australia

Galvin
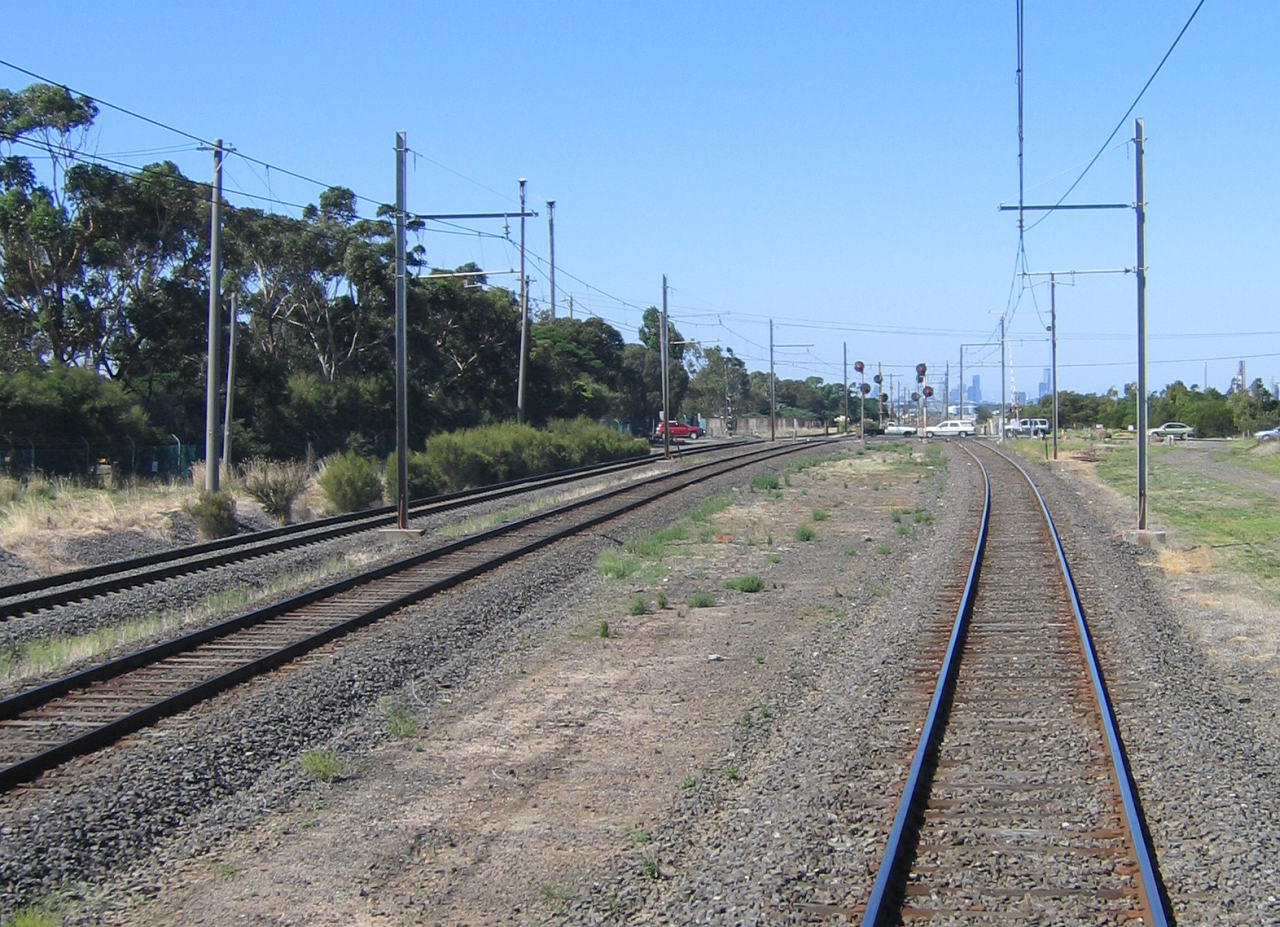
- Station site looking towards city in March 2006

General information
- Coordinates: 37°51′19″S 144°48′26″E
- System: Closed commuter rail station
- Line: Werribee
- Platforms: 2
- Tracks: 2

Other information
- Status: Closed

History
- Opened: 27 August 1927; 98 years ago
- Closed: 14 April 1985; 41 years ago

Former services
| Preceding station | MetRail | Following station |
|---|---|---|
| Paisley towards Flinders Street | Werribee line | Laverton towards Werribee |
List of closed railway stations in Melbourne
Location

Galvin railway station is a closed railway station which was located on the Werribee line of the Melbourne suburban rail system in Australia. It was located adjacent to Maidstone Street, Altona, and was situated between Paisley and Laverton stations.

== History ==
Galvin station opened on 27 August 1927 and was named after Michael Galvin, the Werribee shire president at the time. It was a public platform, but it played a particular role in providing passenger services for workers at industries being established in the area. When the line between Altona Junction and Laverton was duplicated in 1967, Galvin was provided with an island platform. After the system of public transport fare zones was instituted in the early 1980s, Galvin became the border between Zones 1 and 2 on the Werribee Line.

In 1985, a new extension joining Westona and Laverton stations was opened. The Werribee line had been electrified two years earlier,but after the construction of the Westona - Laverton link, trains on the Werribee line were diverted via Altona and Westona to try to make a more viable route, because both Galvin and the nearby Paisley station were little used. As a result, both Galvin and Paisley were bypassed and closed. The last trains stopped at the station on 14 April 1985.

After closure, the station building and platforms were demolished, but the track slew to allow for Galvin's island platform remains.
