= Mobiltown railway station =

Former railway station in Victoria, Australia

Mobiltown
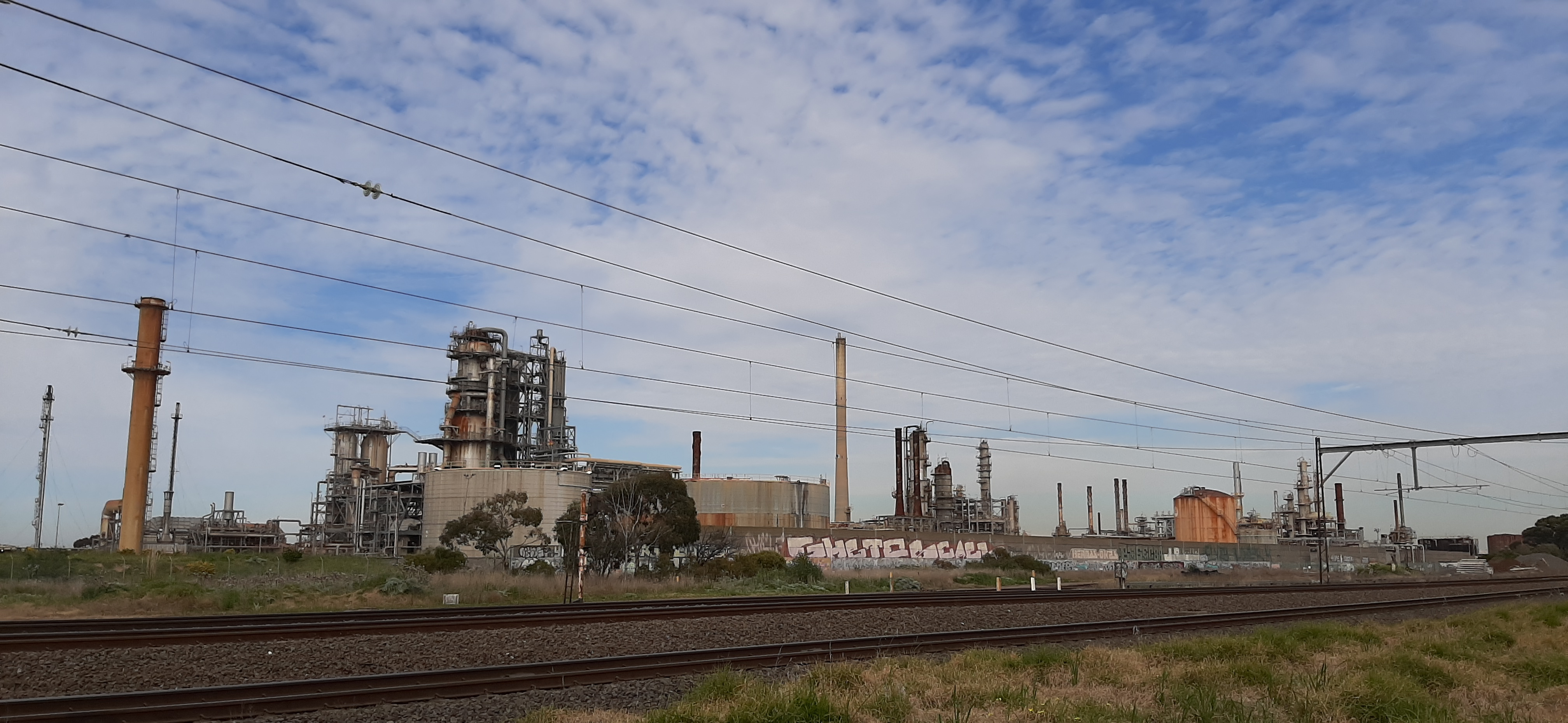
- Railway tracks near the former Mobiltown station site

General information
- Other names: Standard Oil Platform (1953–1954)
- Coordinates: 37°51′05″S 144°51′11″E
- System: Closed commuter rail station
- Line: Altona
- Distance: 13.93 kilometres from Southern Cross
- Platforms: 1
- Tracks: 1

Other information
- Status: Demolished

History
- Opened: 9 November 1953; 72 years ago
- Closed: 18 January 1985; 41 years ago

Former services
Preceding station	MetRail	Following station
Newport towards Flinders Street	Altona line	Seaholme towards Altona
List of closed railway stations in Melbourne
Location

Mobiltown was a railway station on the Altona line, which was part of the Melbourne rail network. It was located immediately north of the Kororoit Creek Road level crossing next to the oil refinery in the suburb of Altona North.

== History ==
The station opened in 1953 as the Standard Oil Platform, serving workers of the oil refinery operated by the Standard Vacuum Oil Company. Construction of the platform was paid for by the company. It was located near the former site of the Williamstown Racecourse station, which was immediately south of the Kororoit Creek Road level crossing and closed in May 1950.

Shortly after the company changed its trading name to Mobil Australia, the station's name was changed to Mobiltown on 1 June 1954.

Mobiltown was made a public platform in 1958. In October 1977, VicRail told Altona City Council that it intended to close the station "as soon as formalities have been completed" because of low patronage, with most refinery workers using the nearby Paisley station.

The station was officially closed on 18 January 1985, less than three months before the Altona line was extended to Laverton and subsumed into the Werribee line, becoming the Altona loop. Upon the opening of the extension, Paisley was closed, leaving Altona North without a railway station.

By 1992, Mobiltown station was demolished and no trace of the platform remained. The Kororoit Creek Road level crossing was removed in 2018, with a rail overpass now overshadowing the former site of the station. As part of this process, the line was partially duplicated.

Australian singer-songwriter Broderick Smith sang about the "Last Train from Mobiltown" on his group's 1981 album Broderick Smith's Big Combo.

== Platforms and services ==
The station at Mobiltown had one platform. It was served by Altona line trains travelling from Newport and Flinders Street.

Mobiltown platform arrangement
Platform	Line	Destination
1	Altona line	Altona, Newport, Flinders Street

== See also ==
- List of closed railway stations in Melbourne
