= Altonah =

Altonah may refer to several places in the United States:

- Altonah, Utah, an unincorporated community in Duchesne County, Utah
- Altonah, Pennsylvania, a former village in Northampton County, Pennsylvania

== See also ==
- Altona (disambiguation)
