= List of places on the Victorian Heritage Register in the City of Hobsons Bay =

This is a list of places on the Victorian Heritage Register in the City of Hobsons Bay in Victoria, Australia. The Victorian Heritage Register is maintained by the Heritage Council of Victoria.

The Victorian Heritage Register, as of 2021, lists 33 state-registered places within the City of Hobsons Bay:

Place name	Place #	Location	Suburb or Town	Co-ordinates	Built	State registered	Photo
Williamstown Cemetery	H1837	89 Champion Rd	Williamstown North	37°51′07″S 144°52′45″E	1857	9 December 1999	
