= Hamburg-Altona (disambiguation) =

Altona, also called Hamburg-Altona, is a borough of the German city of Hamburg.

Hamburg-Altona may also refer to:

- Altona-Altstadt, district of Hamburg, center of the historic city Altona
- Hamburg-Altona (electoral district)
- Hamburg-Altona station
- Hamburg-Altona link line

== Other uses ==
- Hamburg Altona (film), a 1989 Yugoslav film

== See also ==
- Altona
