= Altuna =

Altuna may refer to:

- Altuna Runestone, a Viking Age memorial runestone
- Altuna Sejdiu, Albanian-Macedonian singer-songwriter, known professionally as Tuna
- Fernando Bengoetxea Altuna, known as Pernando Amezketarra
- Horacio Altuna (born 1941), Argentine comics artist
- Jon Altuna (born 1980), Spanish footballer
- Tuna Altuna (born 1989), Turkish tennis player

== See also ==
- Altona (disambiguation)
- Altoona (disambiguation)
- Antuna
