= Frenchtown, U.S. Virgin Islands =

Settlement in United States Virgin Islands

Coordinates: 18.33829°N 64.942090°W

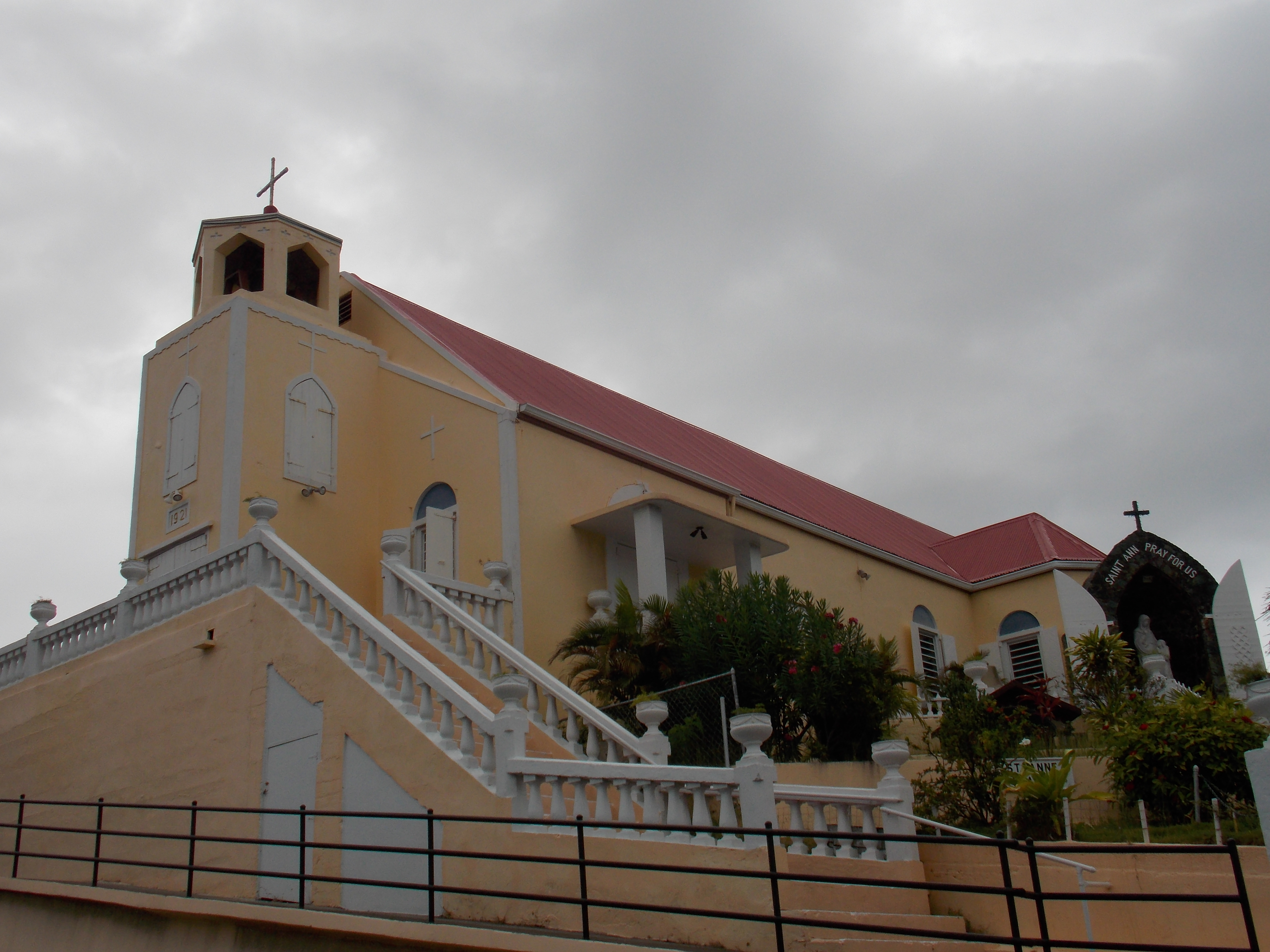
Saine Anne's Chapel.

Frenchtown is a settlement on the island of Saint Thomas in the United States Virgin Islands. It is located on the south coast, on the west side of the capital, Charlotte Amalie and to the east of the settlement of Altona.

== History ==
During the mid to late 19th century, a series of devastating hurricanes and droughts afflicted the nearby island of Saint-Barthelemy. This caused many members of its French-speaking population to migrate to the island of Saint Thomas, where the ones who had been fisherman on Saint-Barthelemy settled in Carenage, later known as Frenchtown.

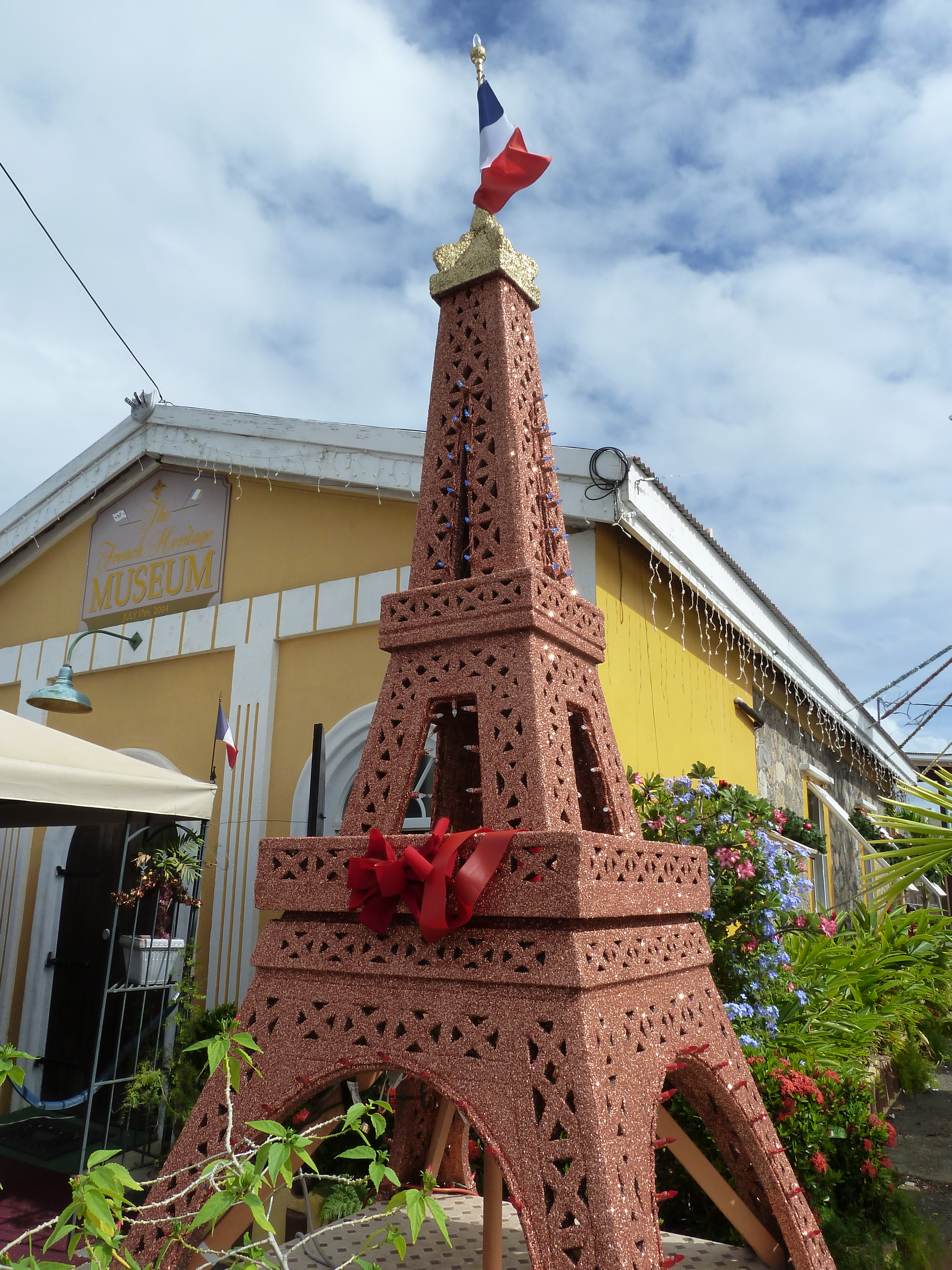
French Heritage Museum, Frenchtown, 2011

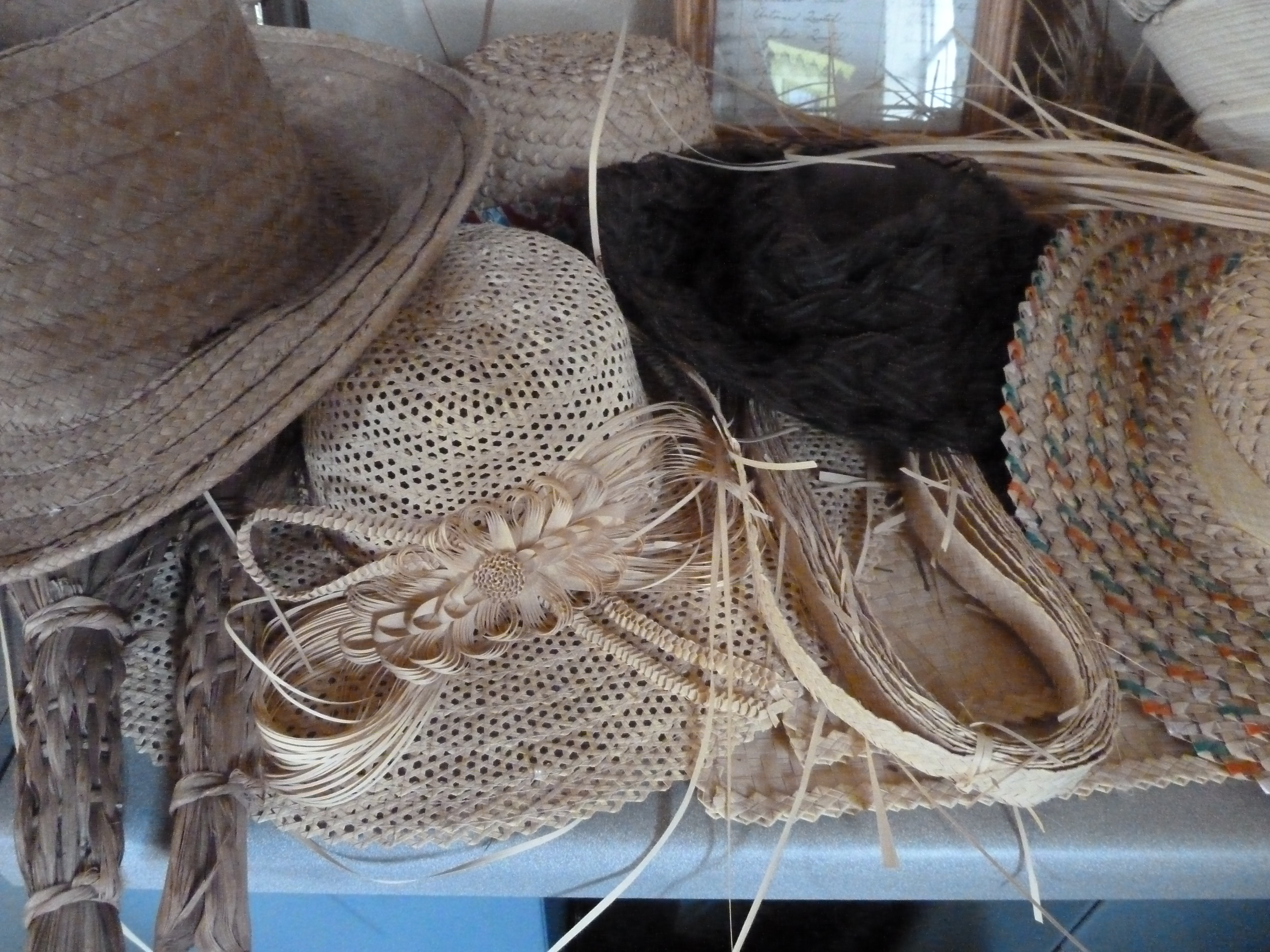
Hats, French Heritage Museum, Frenchtown, 2011

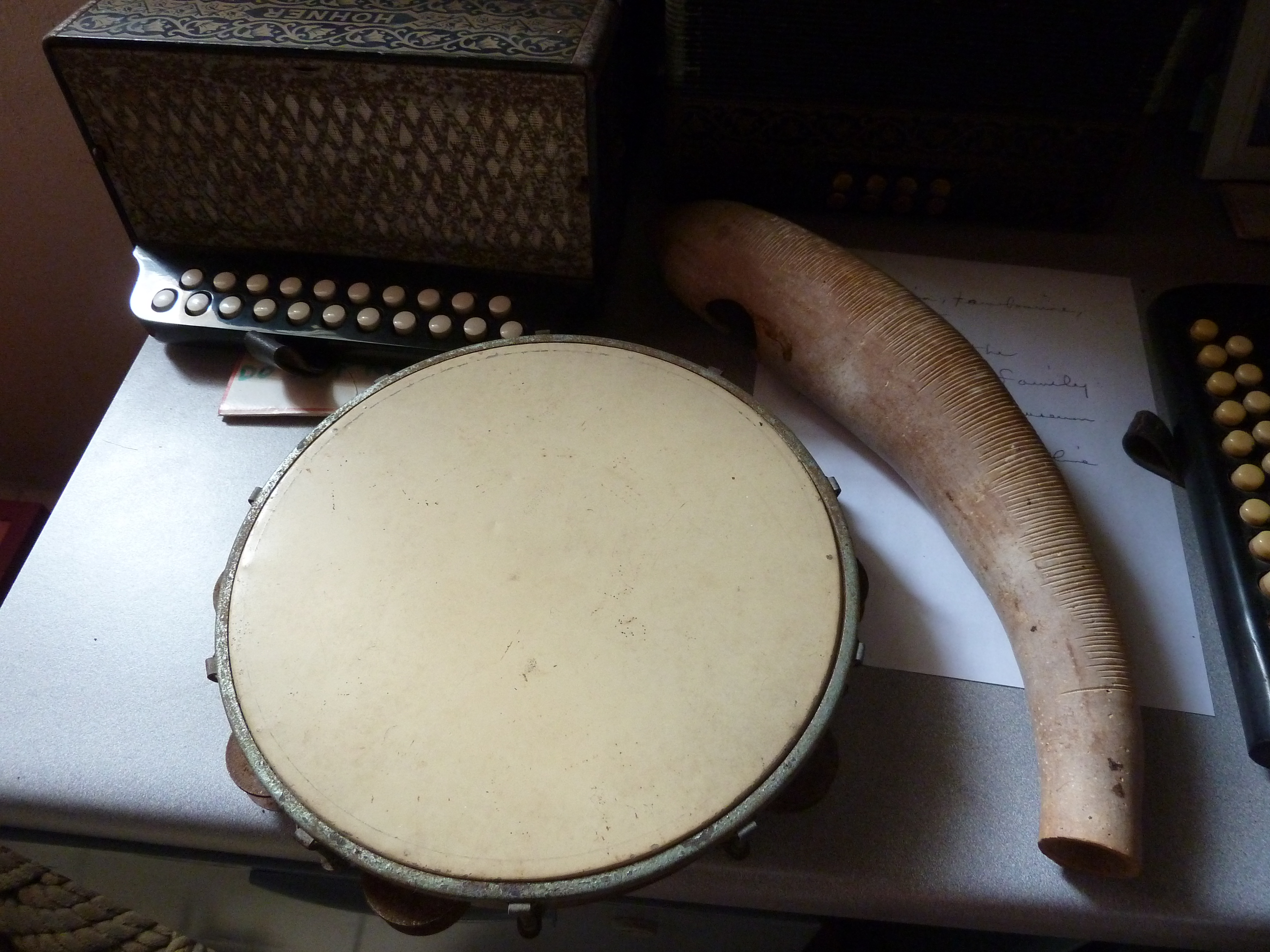
Instruments, French Heritage Museum, Frenchtown, 2011
