= Altona Meadows =

Altona Meadows Melbourne, Victoria
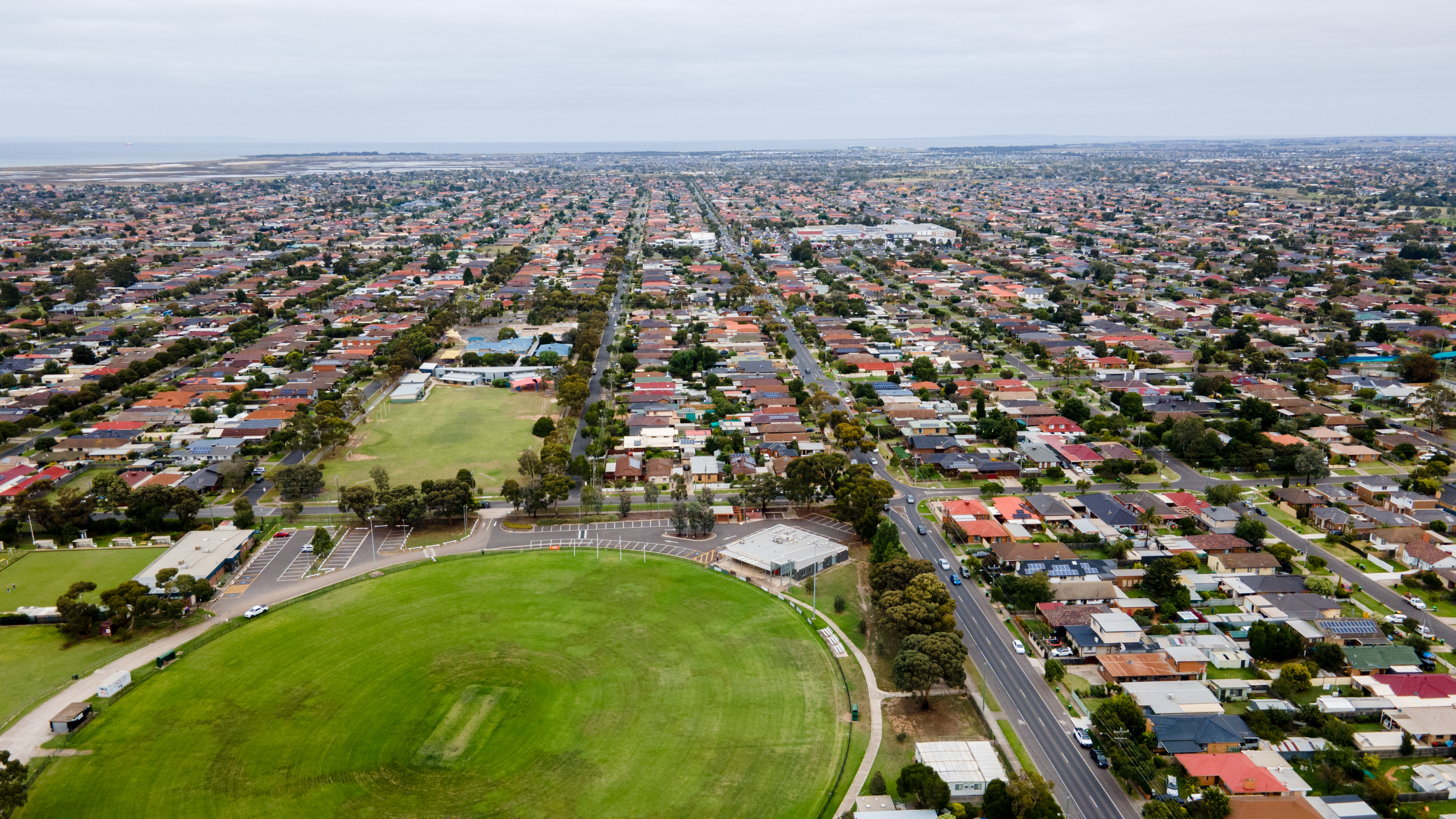
- Aerial view of Altona Meadows

- Coordinates: 37.875°S 144.782°E
- Population: 18,479 (2021 census)
  - Density: 1,777/km^{2} (4,602/sq mi)
- Postcode(s): 3028
- Elevation: 6 m (20 ft)
- Area: 10.4 km^{2} (4.0 sq mi)
- Location: 17 km (11 mi) from Melbourne
- LGA(s): City of Hobsons Bay
- State electorate(s): Point Cook
- Federal division(s): Gellibrand
Suburbs around Altona Meadows:
Laverton	Altona	Altona
Seabrook	Altona Meadows	Port Phillip
Point Cook	Point Cook	Port Phillip

Altona Meadows is a suburb in Melbourne, Victoria, Australia, 17 km (11 mi) south-west of Melbourne's Central Business District, located within the City of Hobsons Bay local government area. Altona Meadows recorded a population of 18,479 at the 2021 census.

Located partly within Altona Meadows, Cheetham Wetlands is a large park with numerous boardwalks traversing its network of lagoons. The wetlands attract large numbers of migratory birds, making it popular with walkers and birdwatchers alike.

== History ==
Altona Meadows Post Office opened on 15 March 1996 as the suburb developed.

== Population ==
Comparing between 2016 census and 2021 census, the data revealed a changing population in Altona Meadows. While the population (19,160 people in 2016 compared to 18,479 in 2021) as well as the proportion of people who is born in Australia (59.2% in 2016 and 62.2 in 2021) remained relatively stable, the proportion of people who is born in India dropped by about a third (4.2% in 2016 and 2.7% in 2021). Besides Australia and India, the next most common countries of birth were England (2.6% in 2016 vs 2.7% in 2021), Malta (2.5% in 2016 and 2.3% in 2021), Vietnam (2.3% in both 2016 and 2021) and the Philippines (2.1% in both 2016 and 2021). The proportion of people who only spoke English at home increased from 59.6% in 2016 to 63.6% in 2021. Other common languages spoken at home included Vietnamese (3.0% in 2016 and 3.1% in 2021), Greek (2.5% in 2016 and 2.1% in 2021), Arabic (3.0% in 2016 and 2.5% in 2021), Maltese (2.7% in 2016 and 2.1% in 2021), and Italian (2.4% in 2016 and 2.0% in 2021). The number of people identified as "No Religion" rose by over a quarter from 24.4% to 31.0% from 2016 to 2021, but the most common religion remained as Catholic (31.1% in 2016 and 30.6% in 2021). In terms of employment, there is a slight shift away from labourers (11.1% in 2016 and 8.7% in 2021) to professionals (17.3% to 19.9%). The number of people who is 65 or above also rose from 14.3% in 2016 to 18% in 2021, and the number of people between 25 and 49 experienced a slight drop from 36.7% to 34.6%.

== Education ==
=== Altona Green Primary School ===
Altona Green Primary School is a state-run primary school established in 1990. In 2020, the school had an enrolment of 388 students from Prep to Year 6, 35.13 equivalent full-time staff; 2 principal class, 21.6 teachers (1 Leading Teacher and 1 Learning Specialist) and Education Support Officers. The school has specialist and support programs for the students, which includes; The Arts, Physical Education, Italian, STEM, Kitchen and Garden program and Literacy Intervention. The school is spacious, safe and well-maintained which attracts students from diverse multicultural and socio-economic backgrounds.

=== Altona Meadows Primary School ===
Altona Meadows Primary School is a state-run primary school that first opened in 1982. The school has a stable enrolment of around 350 students from Prep to Year 6. There is a diverse multicultural and socio-economic background. Notable former pupils include Australian rules footballer Daniel Giansiracusa.

=== Queen of Peace Parish Primary School ===
Queen of Peace Parish Primary School is a Catholic co-educational primary school. Approximately 560 pupils from grades Prep to 6 are at the school. The school was opened in 1982. In 2011, the new gym was opened, along with a new music and performing arts centre.

== Transport ==
=== Bus ===
- Route 411: Laverton Station to Footscray (via Altona Meadows and Altona)
- Route 412: Laverton Station to Footscray (via Altona Meadows and Altona)
- Route 415: Laverton Station to Williamstown (via Altona)
- Route 496: Laverton Station to Sanctuary Lakes
- Route 498: Laverton Station to Hoppers Crossing Station
- Route 944: City to Point Cook (Night Bus Service)

== Politics ==
Altona Meadows falls within the federal electorate of Gellibrand (currently held by the ALP's Tim Watts), the state electorate of Point Cook, as well as the local council area of the City of Hobsons Bay.

Typically for a working-class western suburb of Melbourne, it has consistently been a very safe area for the ALP. However, as new housing estates have been established within the area and it becomes increasingly middle-class, it witnessed some larger-than-average swings towards the Liberals during the Howard years (despite remaining solidly Labor).

== Notable residents ==
- Greg Inglis – Rugby league player

== See also ==
- City of Altona – Parts of Altona Meadows were previously within this former local government area.
- City of Werribee – Parts of Altona Meadows were previously within this former local government area.
