= Seabrook, Victoria =

Seabrook
- Suburb
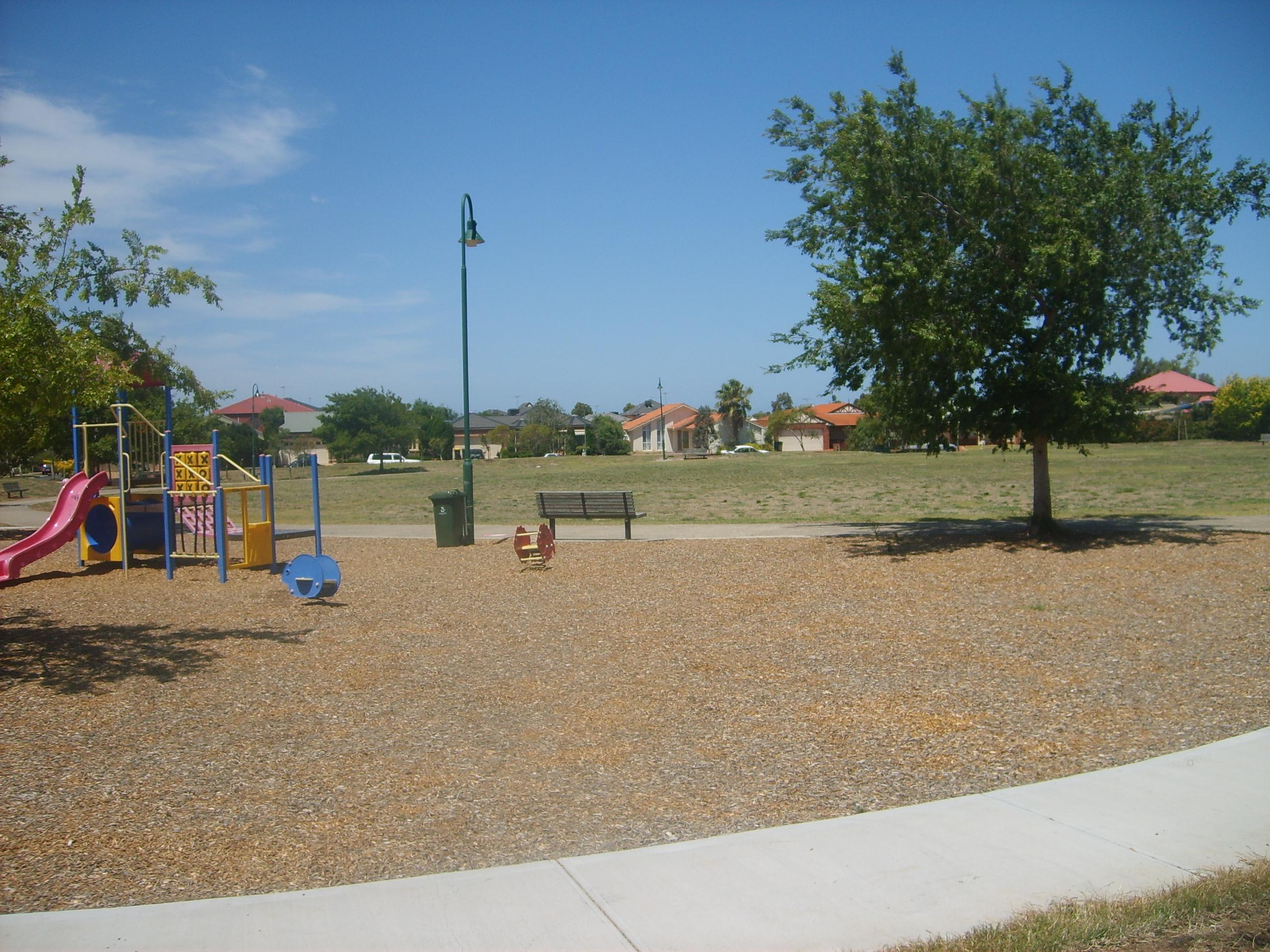
- Homestead Run

- Interactive map of Seabrook
- Coordinates: 37.876°S 144.758°E
- Country: Australia
- State: Victoria
- City: Melbourne
- LGA: City of Hobsons Bay
- Location: 19.5 km (12.1 mi) from Melbourne; 8.5 km (5.3 mi) from Werribee

Government
  - State electorate: Point Cook
  - Federal division: Gellibrand

Area
  - Total: 1.6 km^{2} (0.62 sq mi)
- Elevation: 11 m (36 ft)

Population
  - Total: 4,952 (2021 census)
  - Density: 3,095/km^{2} (8,020/sq mi)
- Postcode: 3028
Suburbs around Seabrook
Point Cook	Altona Meadows	Altona Meadows
Point Cook	Seabrook	Altona Meadows
Point Cook	Point Cook	Point Cook

Seabrook is a suburb in Melbourne, Victoria, Australia, 19 km (12 mi) south-west of Melbourne's Central Business District, located within the City of Hobsons Bay local government area. Seabrook recorded a population of 4,952 at the 2021 census.

== Facilities ==
The suburb has a small shopping area with some take-away food stores and a Solo service station located on Point Cook Road and Mintaro Way. Seabrook Primary School also serves the area for education. Although a public school, Seabrook Primary School ranks amongst the top schools in the state of Victoria. Seabrook Primary School had been an International Baccalaureate (IB) World School between September 2011 and January 2025.

== Transport ==
=== Bus ===
- Route 496: Laverton Station to Sanctuary Lakes
- Route 498: Laverton Station to Hoppers Crossing station
- Route 944: City to Point Cook (Night Bus Service)

== Notable people ==
- Connor Menadue - AFL player

== Gallery ==
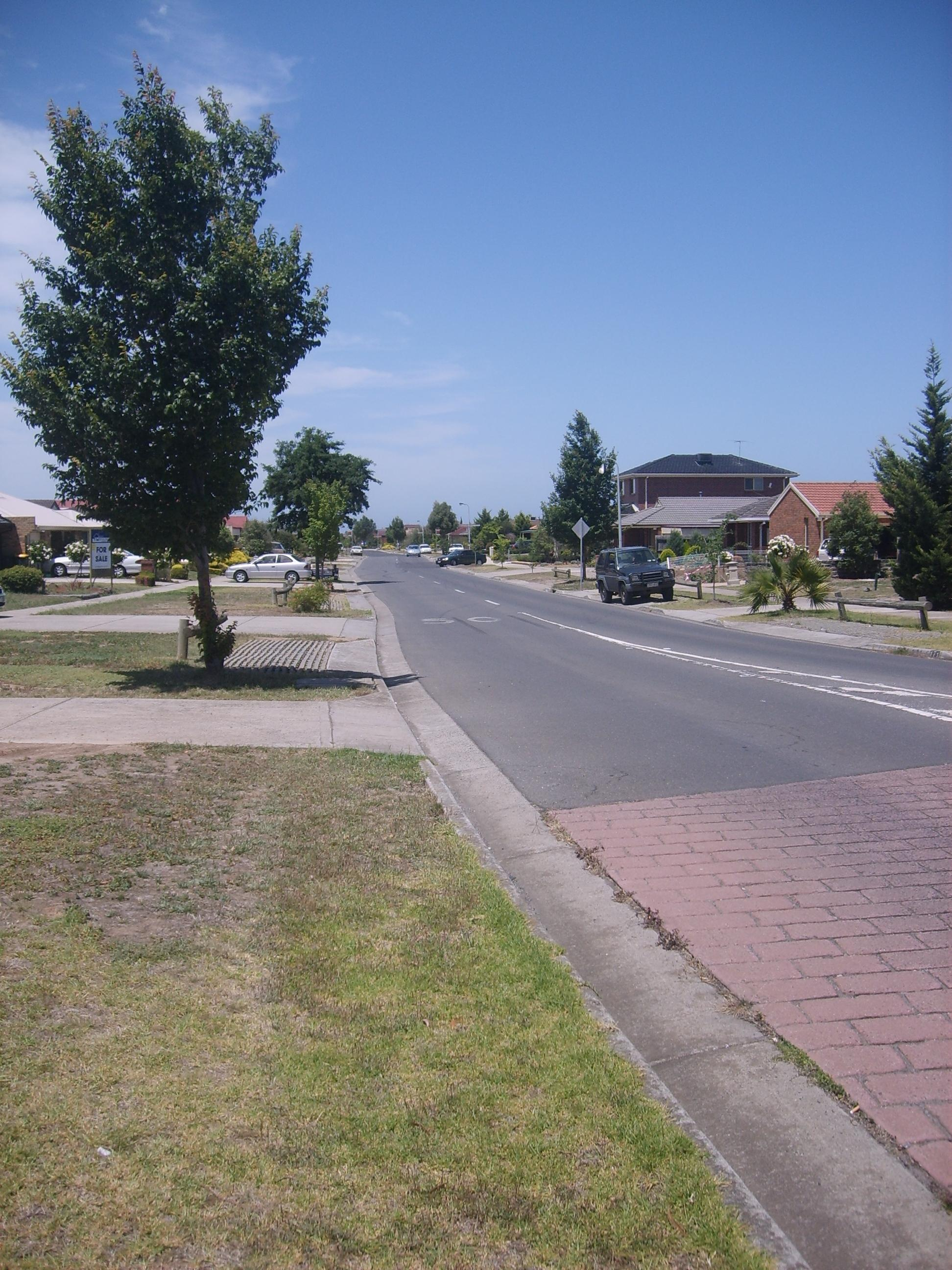
Seabrook Boulevard

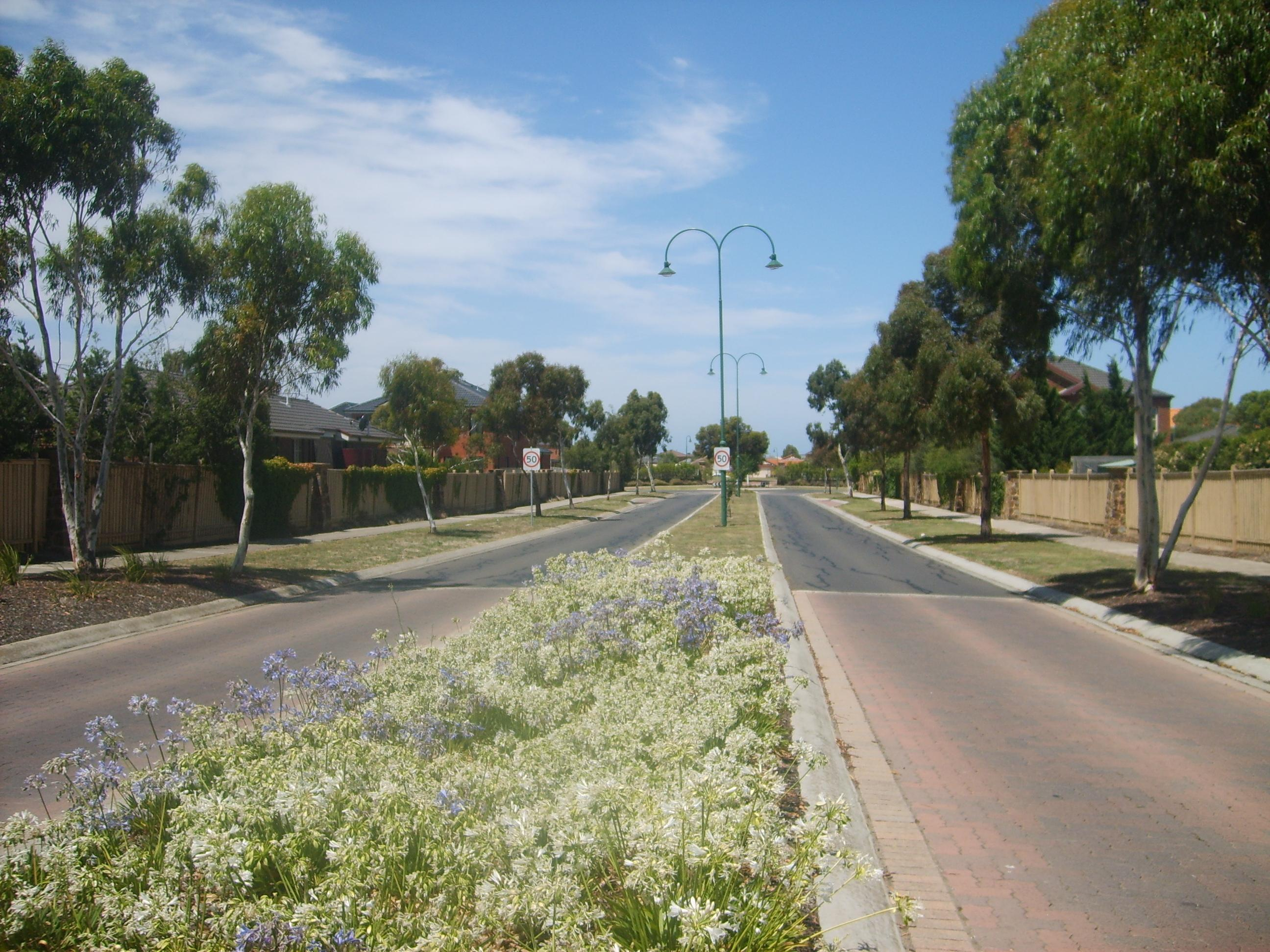
Homestead Run

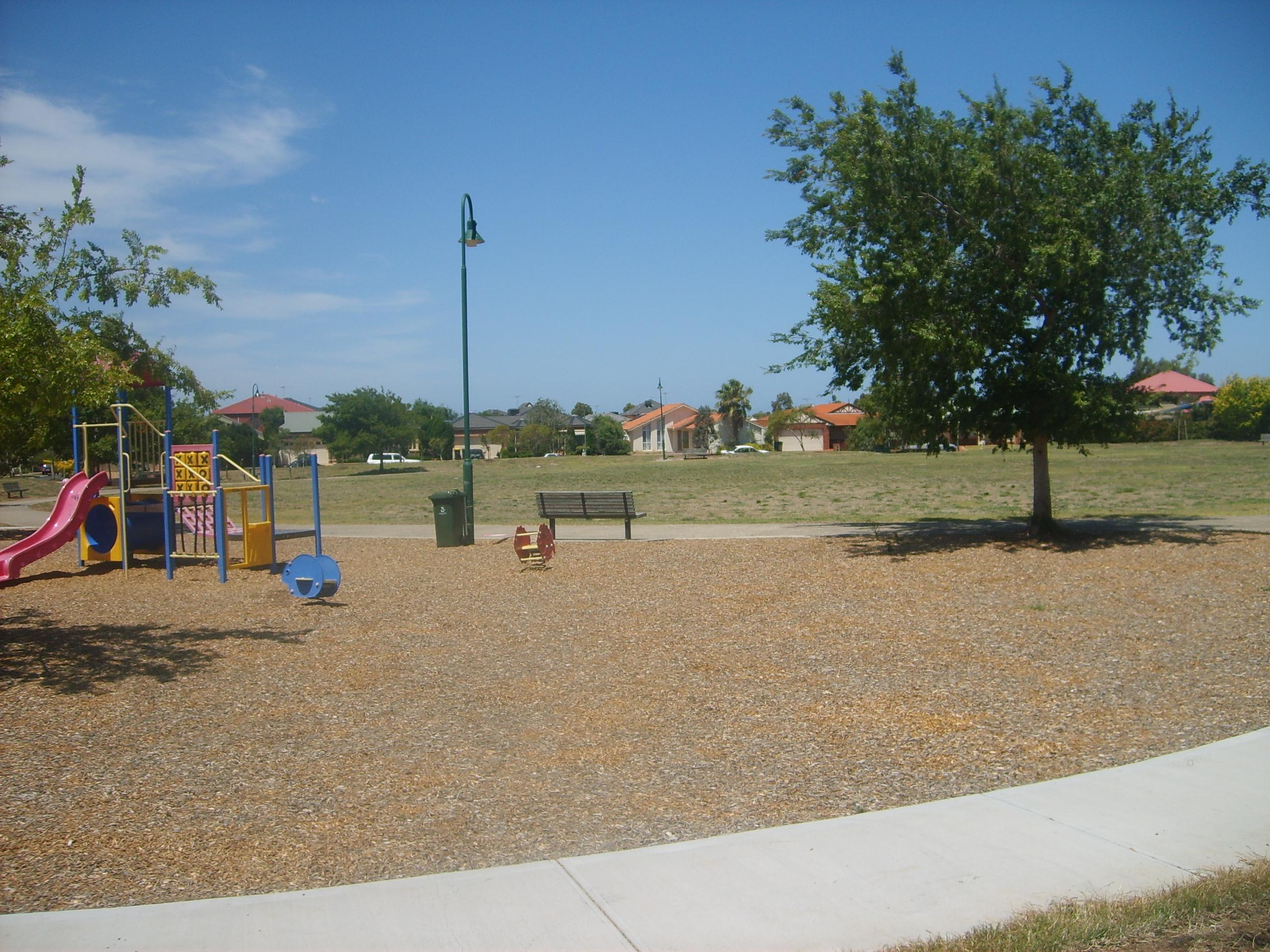
Homestead Run Reserve

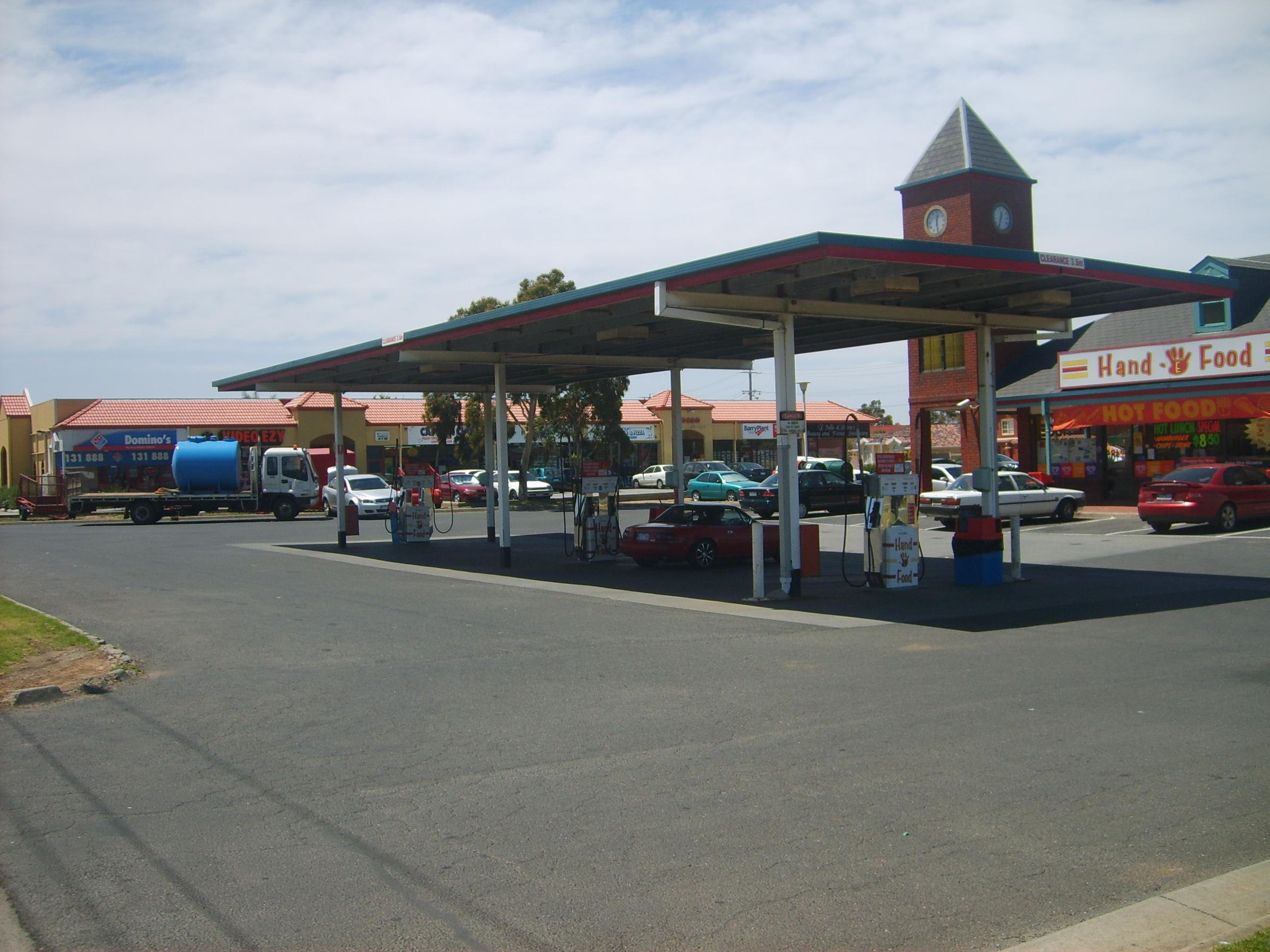
"Hand-e-Food" convenience store and petrol station

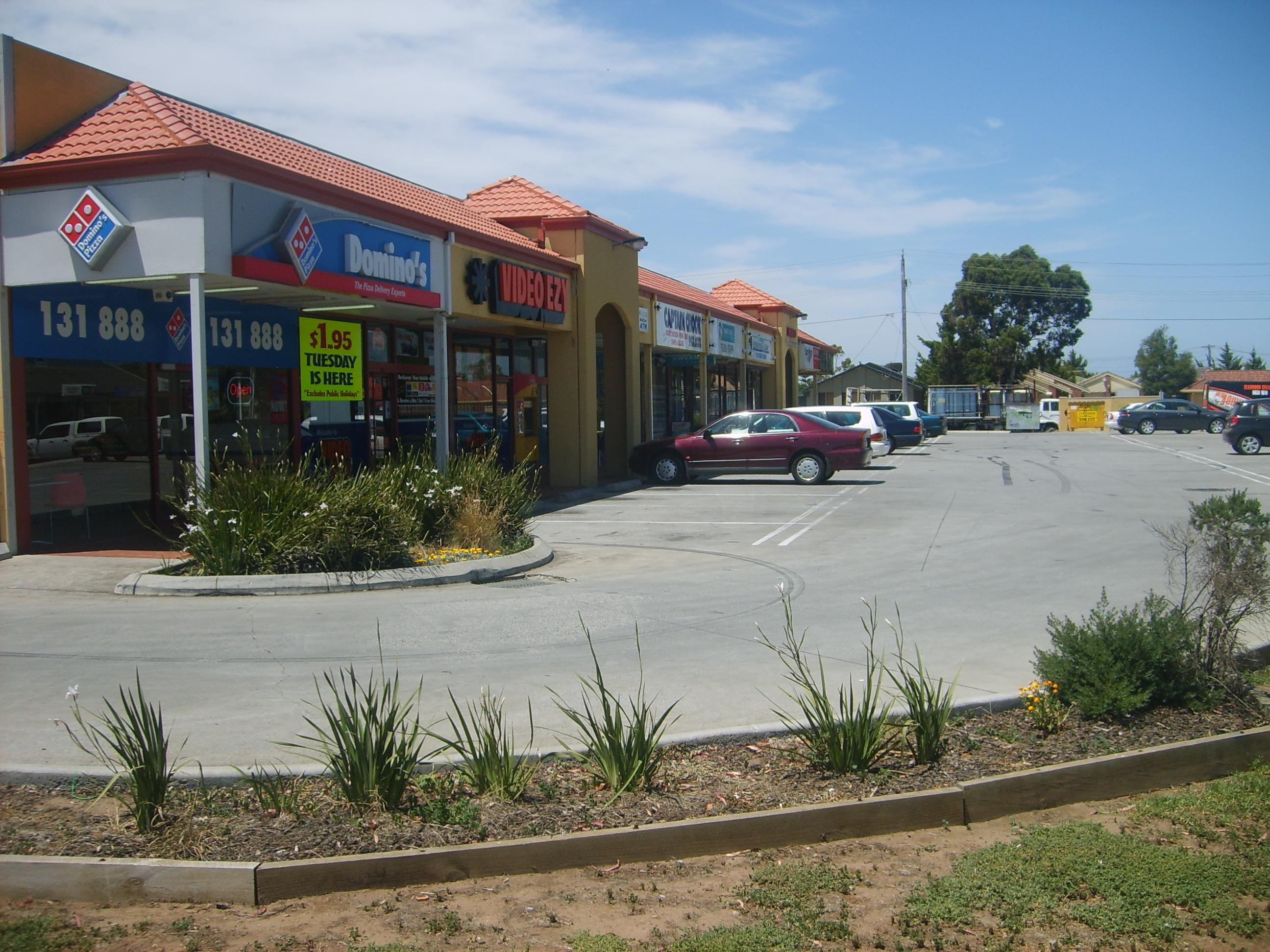
Seabrook Shopping Centre

== See also ==
- City of Werribee – Seabrook was previously within this former local government area.
