= Altona, Saint Croix, U.S. Virgin Islands =

Altona
- Village
- Location in Saint Croix, United States Virgin Islands Altona (the U.S. Virgin Islands)
- Coordinates: 17°44′41″N 64°41′39″W
- Country: United States Virgin Islands
- Island: Saint Croix
- Time zone: UTC-4 (AST)

Altona is a settlement on the island of Saint Croix in the United States Virgin Islands. It is an eastern suburb of Christiansted.

== History ==
Altona (Eastend Quarter A No. 5, Christiansteds Police District and Jurisdiction) is a former livestock estate. As of 1816, it had an area of just 25 acres.17 enslaved labourers were present on the estate. On 8 September 1818, it was sold by auction to P. Borch for Ps. 500. It was already the same day sold by him to J. de la Motta, for Ps. 3,305. On 16 February 1819, 30 acres of the property was sold by J. de la Motta to J. Benners for Ps. 3,000. On 15 October 1824, October 15, Altona was sold by auction to A. Danielsen for Ps. 100. A. Danielsen assumed St. Croix Upper Guardians’ claim in favor of R. Faussett, for Ps. 2,40.

== Sources ==
- U.S. Geological Survey Geographic Names Information System: Altona, Saint Croix, U.S. Virgin Islands
