= Westona railway station =

Railway station in Melbourne, Australia

Westona
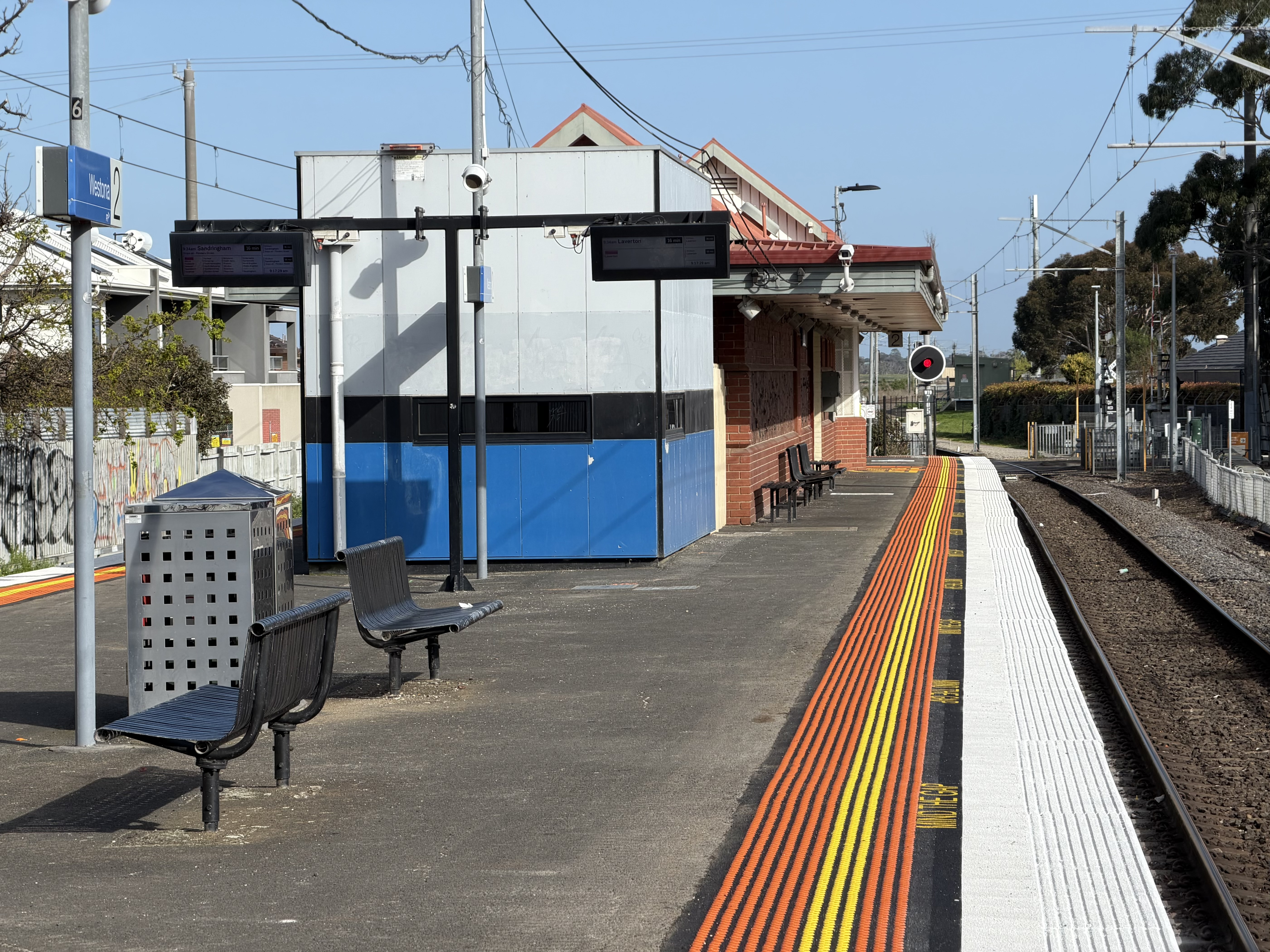
- Westbound view from Platform 2, September 2026

General information
- Location: Maidstone Street, Altona, Victoria 3018; City of Hobsons Bay; Australia
- Coordinates: 37°51′54″S 144°48′49″E
- System: PTV commuter rail station
- Owner: VicTrack
- Operator: Metro Trains
- Line: Werribee
- Distance: 18.53 kilometres from Southern Cross
- Platforms: 2 (1 island)
- Tracks: 2
- Connections: Bus

Construction
- Structure type: Ground
- Parking: 80
- Cycle facilities: Yes
- Accessible: Yes—step free access

Other information
- Status: Operational, unstaffed
- Station code: WTO
- Fare zone: Myki zone 1/2
- Website: Public Transport Victoria

History
- Opened: 21 January 1985; 41 years ago
- Electrified: January 1985 (1500 V DC overhead)

Passengers
- 2005–2006: 268,293
- 2006–2007: 296,515 ▲10.51%
- 2007–2008: 316,372 ▲6.69%
- 2008–2009: 349,476 ▲10.46%
- 2009–2010: 350,423 ▲0.27%
- 2010–2011: 309,620 ▼11.64%
- 2011–2012: 245,212 ▼20.8%
- 2012–2013: Not measured
- 2013–2014: 227,635 ▼7.16%
- 2014–2015: 229,932 ▲1%
- 2015–2016: 238,575 ▲3.75%
- 2016–2017: 236,790 ▼0.74%
- 2017–2018: 240,157 ▲1.42%
- 2018–2019: 240,150 ▼0.002%
- 2019–2020: 212,000 ▼11.72%
- 2020–2021: 107,350 ▼49.36%
- 2021–2022: 137,950 ▲28.5%

Services
Preceding station	Metro Trains	Following station
Altona towards Sandringham via Flinders Street	Werribee line Weekdays	Laverton Terminus
Altona towards Sandringham via Flinders Street	Werribee line Weekends	Laverton towards Werribee
Track layout
Location

Westona station is a railway station operated by Metro Trains Melbourne on the Werribee line, part of the Melbourne rail network. It serves the western suburb of Altona, in Melbourne, Victoria, Australia. Westona station is a ground level unstaffed station, featuring an island platform. It opened on 21 January 1985.

Westona is a crossing loop in the middle of a 10-kilometre-long section of single track between Altona Junction and Laverton. The direction in which trains cross at Westona is unusual for Melbourne, in that they pass each other on the right, rather than passing on the more common left.

== History ==
In 1965, the Victorian Parliament passed the Altona Railway Extension Act, which authorised a 1-mile (1.6 km) extension of the Altona railway, west to Maidstone Street. Despite a sign being erected on the future site of Westona station, proclaiming that a railway was to be built to there, nothing was done for almost two decades.

Westona station opened on 21 January 1985, when the railway line from Altona was extended. After opening, the station was briefly the terminus of the line, with the up face of the island platform (Platform 1) only in use. During the time that Westona was the terminus, the Altona Loop operated under Staff and Ticket operations from Altona to Westona which meant that only one driver at a time could carry the token and travel on the section. On 14 April of that year, the track to Laverton was opened and three position signalling was commissioned between Altona Junction and Laverton, replacing staff and ticket and two position signalling between Altona Junction and Altona. The station was named by Joanna O'Connor, Alan Angus and Betty Angus, who won a council-run contest to find a name. Because the new station was west of Altona, they suggested Westona.

In 1986, control of all signals and points was transferred to the Newport signal box, with the signal control panel moved to the relay room for maintenance and emergency purposes only.

== Platforms and services ==
Westona has one island platform with two faces. It is served by Werribee line trains.

Westona platform arrangement
Platform	Line	Destination	Via	Service Type	Notes	Source
1	Werribee line	Sandringham	Altona and Flinders Street	All stations		
2	Werribee line	Laverton		All stations	Weekdays.	
2	Werribee line	Werribee		All stations	After 7pm and weekends.	

== Transport links ==
CDC Melbourne operates one bus route via Westona station, under contract to Public Transport Victoria:

- 415 : Laverton station – Williamstown
