= Altona, Saint Thomas, U.S. Virgin Islands =

Coordinates: 18.338846°N 64.948758°W

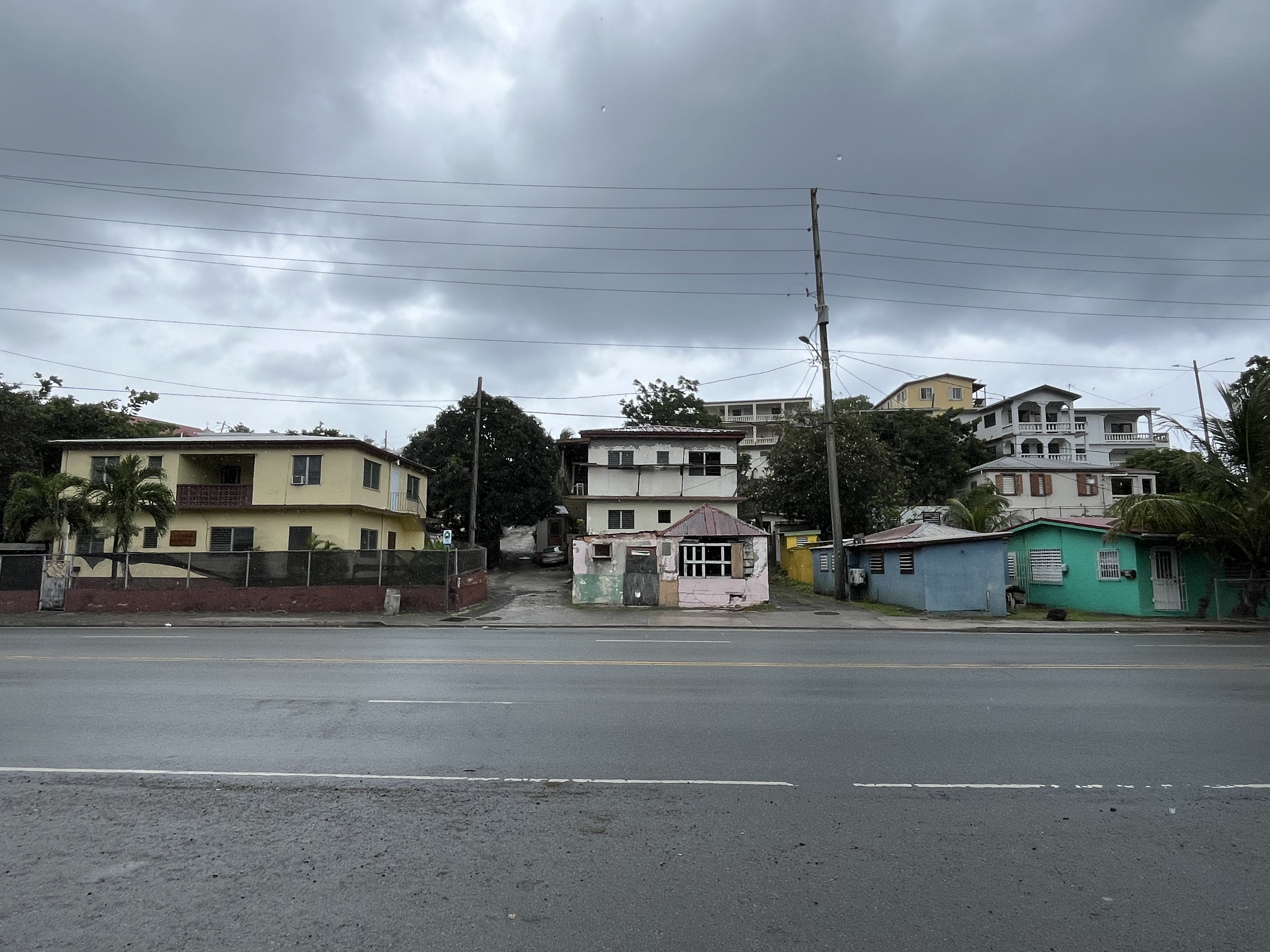
Altona

Altona is a settlement on the island of Saint Thomas in the United States Virgin Islands. It is located on the south coast, to the west of the capital, Charlotte Amalie and the settlement of Frenchtown.
