= Altona Refinery =

Oil refinery in Victoria, Australia

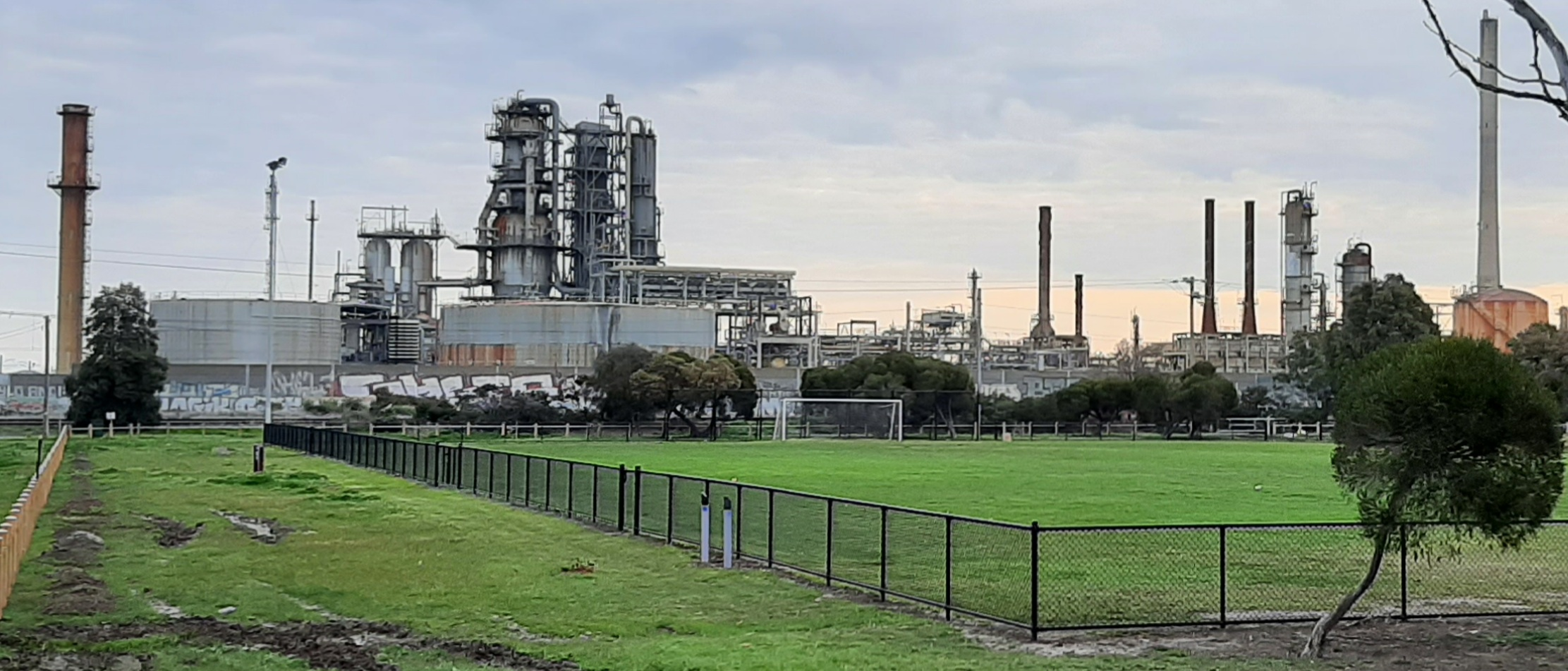

- Location within Victoria
- Location: Altona North, Victoria, Australia; 37.85°S 144.85°E

Refinery details
- Owner: ExxonMobil
- Opened: 1949
- Closed: 2022 (planned)
- Capacity: 90,000 barrels per day (14,000 m^{3}/d)
- No. of employees: 350 (2021)

The Altona Refinery was an oil refinery in Altona North, Victoria, Australia, operated by ExxonMobil. The refinery is located next to Kororoit Creek which is not navigable. Ships unload at a pier on Point Gellibrand in nearby Williamstown.

Its output was 14.5 million litres of refined oil products each day. Employing 350 staff (in 2019), it was the smallest refinery in Australia, but also one of the oldest. The facility stopped refining fuel in 2020, and switched to a fuel importing and distribution network.

== History ==
The Altona Refinery construction commenced in 1946 and was completed in 1954. It was constructed by Braun Transworld Corporation for Standard Vacuum Oil Company. The refinery was upgraded in 2004 to comply with new national fuel standards. By 2005 the refinery was struggling with cutbacks and less demand seeing the facility struggling to survive. There has been some talk of its closure since at least 2014, due to competition from other refineries in Asia. However demand grew and in 2016 production had increased, and the facility was not only being fully utilised, but a $20 million investment saw one of the existing crude oil units get a pre-distillation stage added, enabling the growth of its production of premium products. Demand dropped during the COVID-19 pandemic, and output was decreased.

== Output of the facility ==
In 2016 the refinery's overall production was 80,000 barrels per day, 60% of that being petrol, 30% diesel and 10% jet fuel, which is piped directly to Melbourne Airport. It also produces LPG. The refinery could produce petrol with 1% benzene and diesel with a maximum sulfur content of 50ppm. To improve quality after the 2004 upgrade, sulfur content in diesel was further reduced to 10ppm.

80 storage tanks were used to store the products produced by the refinery. From here, around 90% of products are transported to ExxonMobil Australia's Yarraville Terminal using a pipeline, with the distribution of the products there by road and rail. LPG produced by the refinery would then go to the Qenos plant, at the Altona chemical complex. It would also go to the Geelong LyondellBasell chemical plant.

== Closure and future plans ==
In February 2021, ExxonMobil announced the Altona Refinery would close and be converted to a fuel import terminal. By 2022, most of the refinery processes had been closed, with some of the facilities that would be integrated into the new import facility remaining.

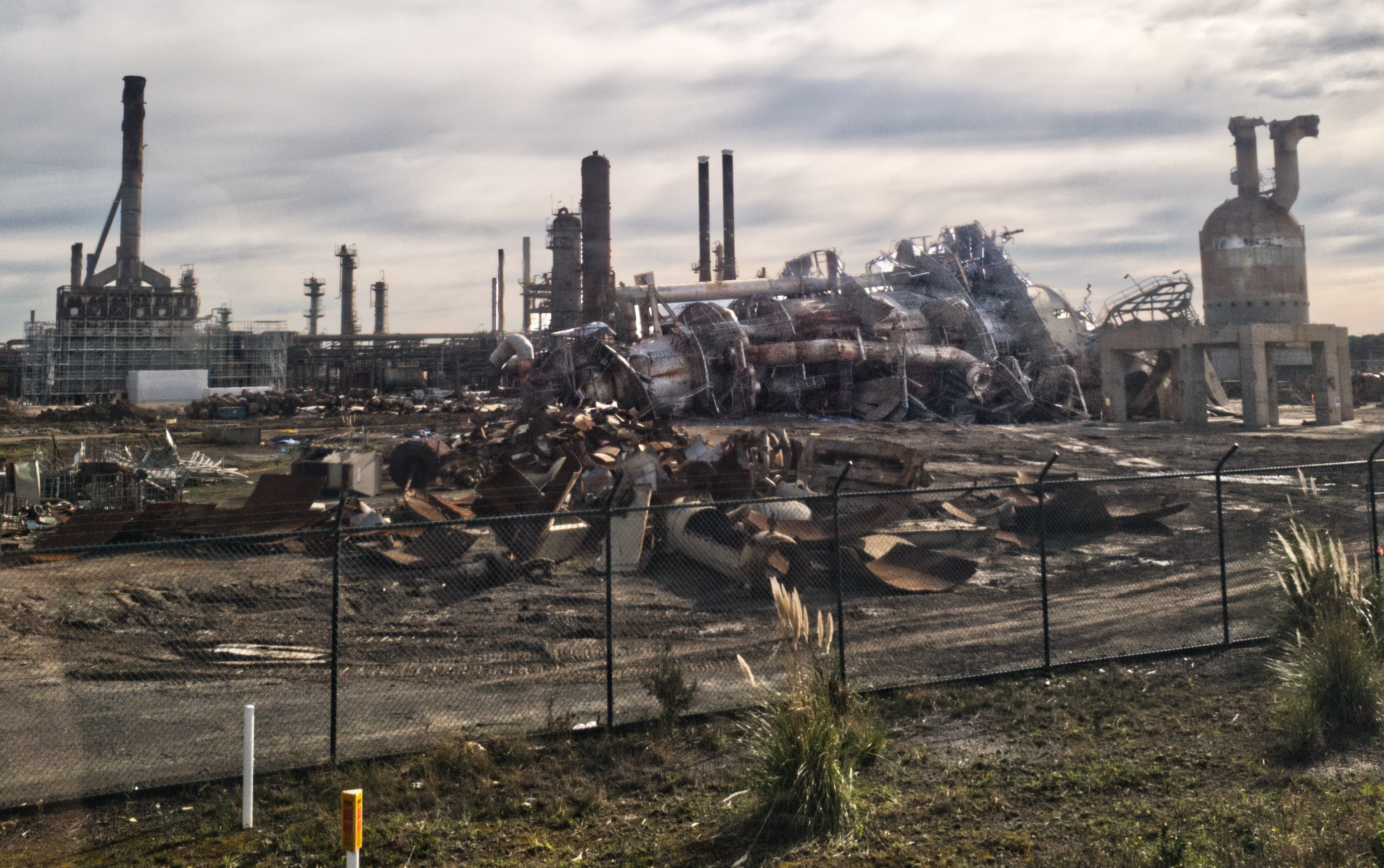
The catalytic converter tower of the refinery after being demolished by a planned explosion as part of the decommissioning process

The decommission of the refinery infrastructure that will not be part of the future terminal was underway in 2022. The site is still an active fuel distribution network, so the decommissioning had to take place in an environment that was still operating as a business, as fuel tanks and truck continued to drop off and collect fuel for distribution. Future decommissioning work is likely to go into the mid-2020s. Plans were for the fuel to be shipped into the deep water port at Point Gellibrand, and then moved to Yarraville.
