= Trafalgar railway station =

Railway station in Victoria, Australia

Trafalgar
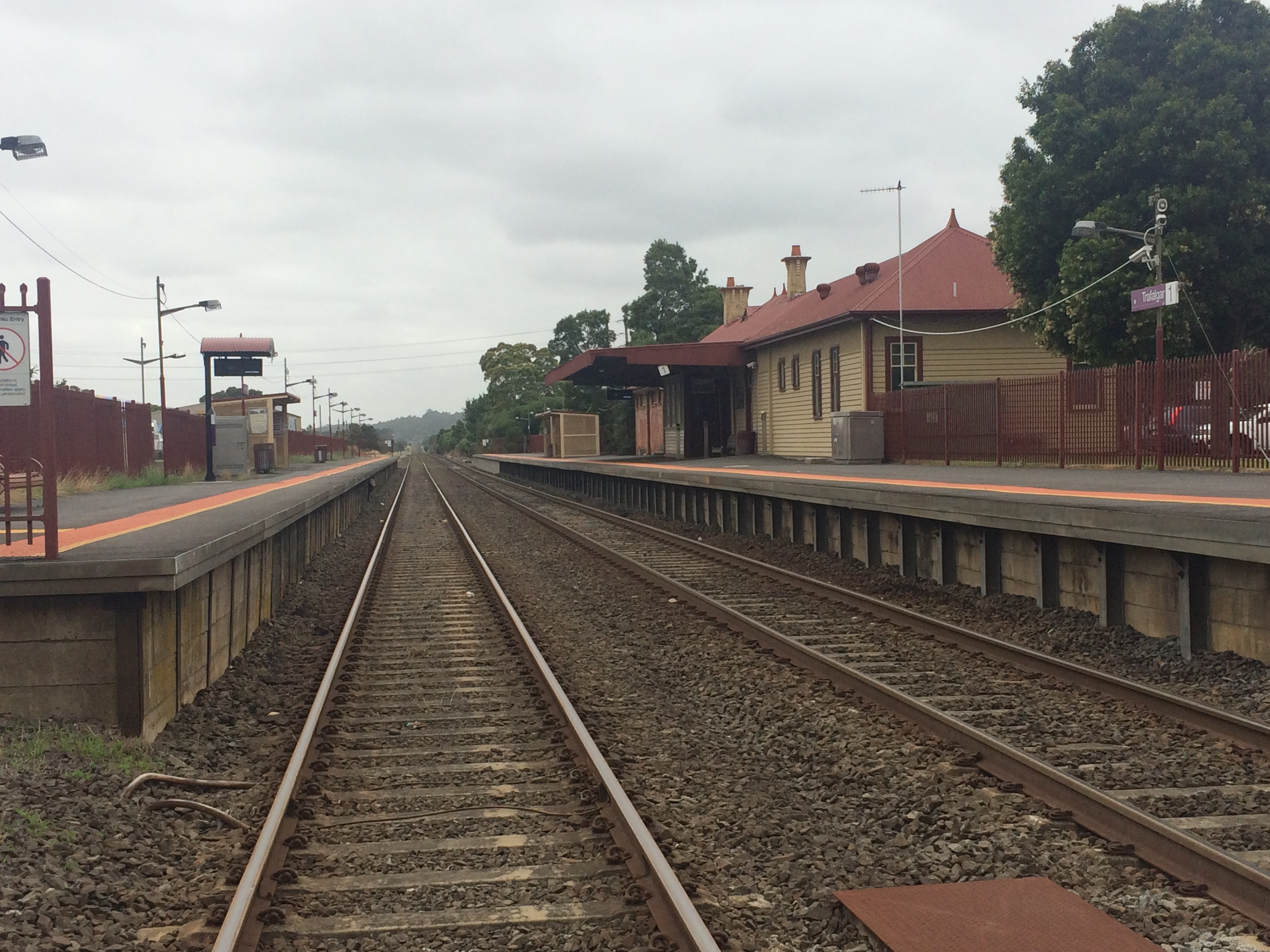
- Eastbound view of station platforms, January 2017

General information
- Location: Princes Highway, Trafalgar, Victoria 3824; Shire of Baw Baw; Australia
- Coordinates: 38°12′27″S 146°09′18″E
- System: PTV regional rail station
- Owner: VicTrack
- Operator: V/Line
- Line: Gippsland
- Distance: 120.27 kilometres from Southern Cross
- Platforms: 2 side
- Tracks: 2
- Connections: Bus

Construction
- Structure type: At-grade
- Parking: Yes
- Cycle facilities: Yes
- Accessible: Yes

Other information
- Status: Operational, unstaffed
- Station code: TFG
- Fare zone: Myki zone 8/9
- Website: Public Transport Victoria

History
- Opened: 1 August 1878; 148 years ago
- Former names: Narracan (1884)

Services
| Preceding station | V/Line | Following station |
|---|---|---|
| Yarragon towards Southern Cross | Gippsland line | Moe towards Traralgon or Bairnsdale |
Location
- Location within Victoria

Trafalgar railway station is a regional railway station on the Gippsland line, part of the Victorian railway network. It serves the town of Trafalgar, in Victoria, Australia. Trafalgar station is a ground level unstaffed station, featuring two side platforms. It opened on 1 August 1878.

Initially opened as Trafalgar, the station was renamed two times. It was renamed to Narracan on 5 May 1884, then was given its current name of Trafalgar on 2 June of that year.

== History ==
In 1955, electrification of the line was extended from Warragul to Moe, passing through the station. In 1958, the line from Yarragon was duplicated, and included a new down platform (Platform 2), a new signal panel and flashing light signals at the Ashby Street level crossing, located nearby in the up direction of the station. In 1960, the line between Trafalgar and Moe was duplicated.

On 2 July 1987, electrification between Warragul and Traralgon ceased. In 1996, a footbridge at the station, which was located at the up end, was closed, and replaced with a pedestrian crossing. In 1997, boom barriers were provided at the Ashby Street level crossing.

A disused goods shed and platform formerly existed behind Platform 2. However, were removed in 2004 by the current land owners, Reid Stockfeeds. On 28 April 2006, the signal panel was abolished.

== Platforms and services ==
Trafalgar has two side platforms. Most trains depart from Platform 1, but some peak hour services use Platform 2. It is serviced by V/Line Traralgon and selected Bairnsdale line services.

Trafalgar platform arrangement
| Platform | Line | Destination |
|---|---|---|
| 1 | Traralgon line Bairnsdale line | Southern Cross |
| 2 | Traralgon line Bairnsdale line | Traralgon, Bairnsdale |

== Transport links ==
Warragul Bus Lines operates two routes via Trafalgar station, under contract to Public Transport Victoria:

- Garfield station – Traralgon Plaza
- Traralgon station – Drouin North
