= Tynong railway station =

Railway station in Victoria, Australia

Tynong
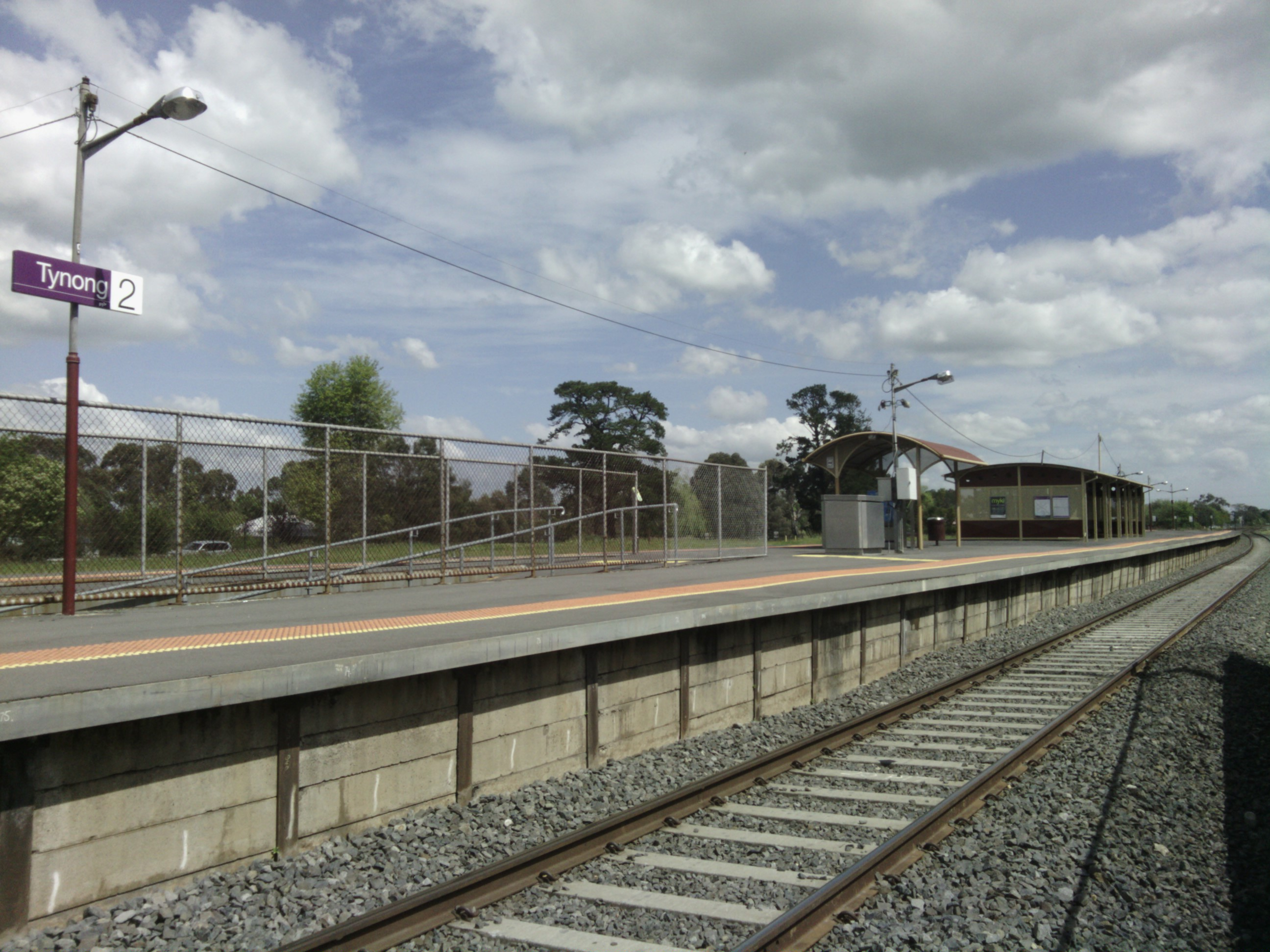
- Westbound view of Platform 2, October 2014

General information
- Location: Nar Nar Goon–Longwarry Road, Tynong, Victoria 3813; Shire of Cardinia; Australia
- Coordinates: 38°05′05″S 145°37′44″E
- System: PTV regional rail station
- Owner: VicTrack
- Operator: V/Line
- Line: Gippsland
- Distance: 70.80 kilometres from Southern Cross
- Platforms: 2 (1 island)
- Tracks: 2
- Connections: Bus

Construction
- Structure type: At-grade
- Parking: Yes
- Accessible: Yes

Other information
- Status: Operational, unstaffed
- Station code: TYN
- Fare zone: Myki zone 3/4
- Website: Public Transport Victoria

History
- Opened: 12 February 1880; 146 years ago

Services
Preceding station	V/Line	Following station
Nar Nar Goon towards Southern Cross	Gippsland line	Garfield towards Traralgon or Bairnsdale
Location
- Location within Victoria

Tynong railway station is a regional railway station operated by V/Line on the Gippsland line, part of the Victoria rail network. It serves the town of Tynong, in Victoria, Australia. Tynong is a ground-level unstaffed station, featuring an island platform with two faces. The station opened on 12 February 1880.

== History ==
In 1953, the line from Nar Nar Goon was duplicated, with electrification between Pakenham and Warragul occurring in 1954. In 1956, the line to Bunyip was duplicated, and in 1957, the present island platform was provided, when duplication of the line was provided through the station.

Rail sidings were once provided at Tynong, however they were withdrawn in 1978/1979. On 1 October 1979, freight services to and from the station were withdrawn. A further siding was removed in 1982.

In 1998, electrified services between Pakenham and Warragul ceased, with de-electrification between those stations occurring in 2001.

== Platforms and services ==
Tynong has one island platform with two faces. It is serviced by V/Line Traralgon and selected Bairnsdale line services.

Tynong platform arrangement
Platform	Line	Destination
1	Traralgon line Bairnsdale line	Southern Cross
2	Traralgon line Bairnsdale line	Traralgon, Bairnsdale

== Transport links ==
Warragul Bus Lines operates two routes via Tynong station, under contract to Public Transport Victoria:

- Garfield station – Nar Nar Goon station
- Pakenham station – Garfield station
