= Yarragon railway station =

Railway station in Victoria, Australia

Yarragon
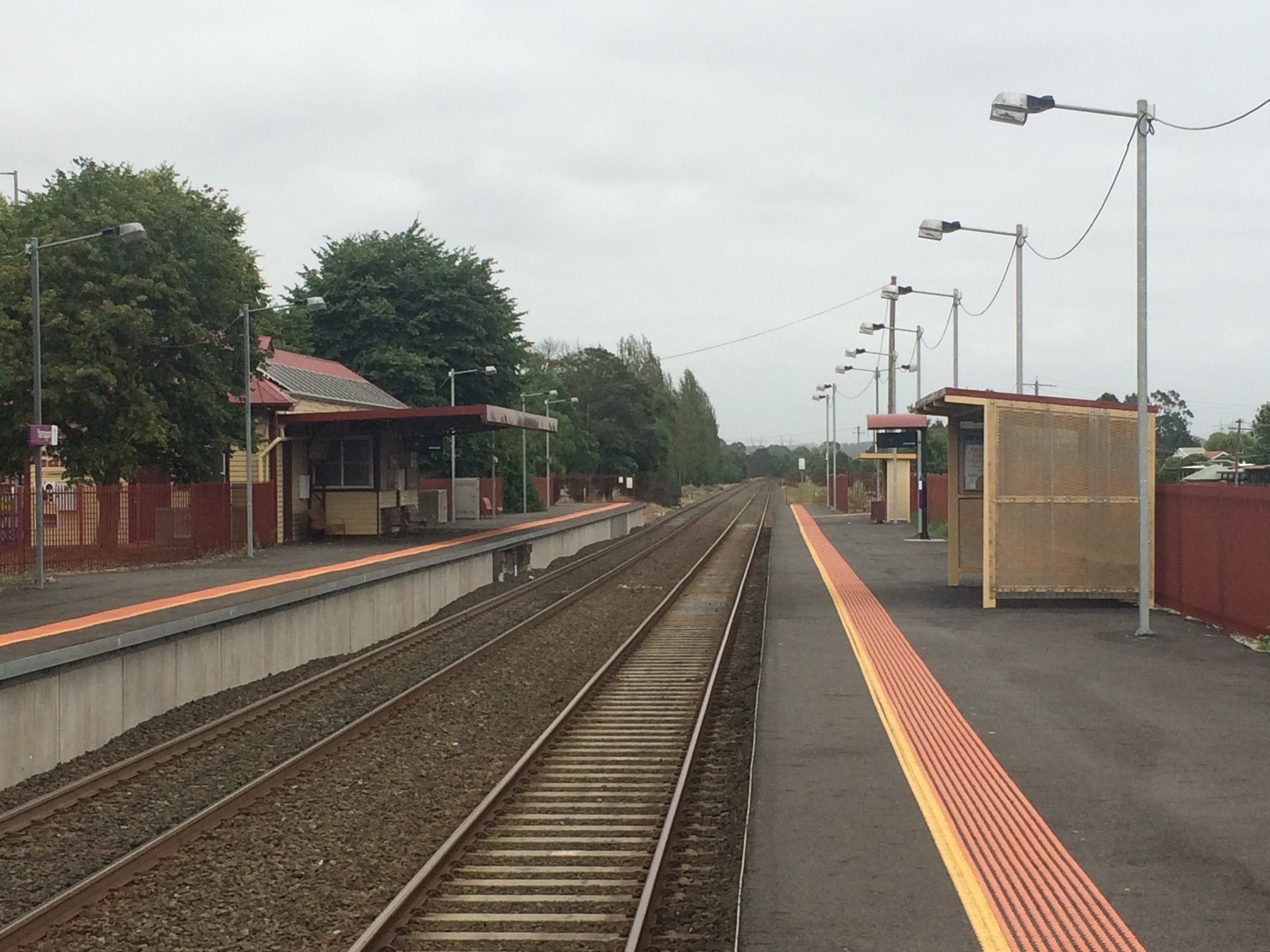
- Westbound view from Platform 2, January 2017

General information
- Location: Princes Highway, Yarragon, Victoria 3823; Shire of Baw Baw; Australia
- Coordinates: 38°12′13″S 146°03′49″E
- System: PTV regional rail station
- Owner: VicTrack
- Operator: V/Line
- Line: Gippsland
- Distance: 112.22 kilometres from Southern Cross
- Platforms: 2 side
- Tracks: 2
- Connections: Bus

Construction
- Structure type: At-grade
- Parking: 12 spaces
- Accessible: Yes

Other information
- Status: Operational, unstaffed
- Station code: YON
- Fare zone: Myki zone 8
- Website: Public Transport Victoria

History
- Opened: 1 August 1878; 148 years ago
- Former names: Waterloo (1878-1883)

Services
| Preceding station | V/Line | Following station |
|---|---|---|
| Warragul towards Southern Cross | Gippsland line | Trafalgar towards Traralgon or Bairnsdale |
Location
- Location within Victoria

Yarragon railway station is a regional railway station on the Gippsland line, part of the Victorian railway network. It serves the town of Yarragon, in Victoria, Australia. Yarragon station is a ground level unstaffed station, featuring two side platforms. It opened on 1 August 1878.

Initially opened as Waterloo, the station was given its current name of Yarragon on 17 December 1883.

== History ==
In 1952, the line between Warragul and Yarragon was duplicated. In 1955, electrification of the line was extended from Warragul to Moe, passing through the station. In 1958, duplication of the line to Trafalgar occurred.

On 2 July 1987, electrification between Warragul and Traralgon ceased. During August 1988, the double line block system between Yarragon and Warragul was abolished, with automatic three position signalling introduced. Switching out facilities were also provided at Yarragon during this time.

Steam locomotive K162 is on display, opposite the entrance to Platform 1. This locomotive was exchanged for K183 of the same class, when Steamrail Victoria deemed the latter to be in better condition. K183's tender remained, and thus K162 was painted as K183.

A disused goods platform exists behind Platform 2. By 2019, it was partly demolished, and the rail was removed.

== Platforms and services ==
Yarragon platform arrangement
| Platform | Line | Destination |
|---|---|---|
| 1 | Traralgon line Bairnsdale line | Southern Cross |
| 2 | Traralgon line Bairnsdale line | Traralgon, Bairnsdale |

== Transport links ==
Warragul Bus Lines operates two routes via Yarragon station, under contract to Public Transport Victoria:

- Garfield station – Traralgon Plaza
- Traralgon station – Drouin North
