= Drouin railway station =

Railway station in Victoria, Australia

Drouin
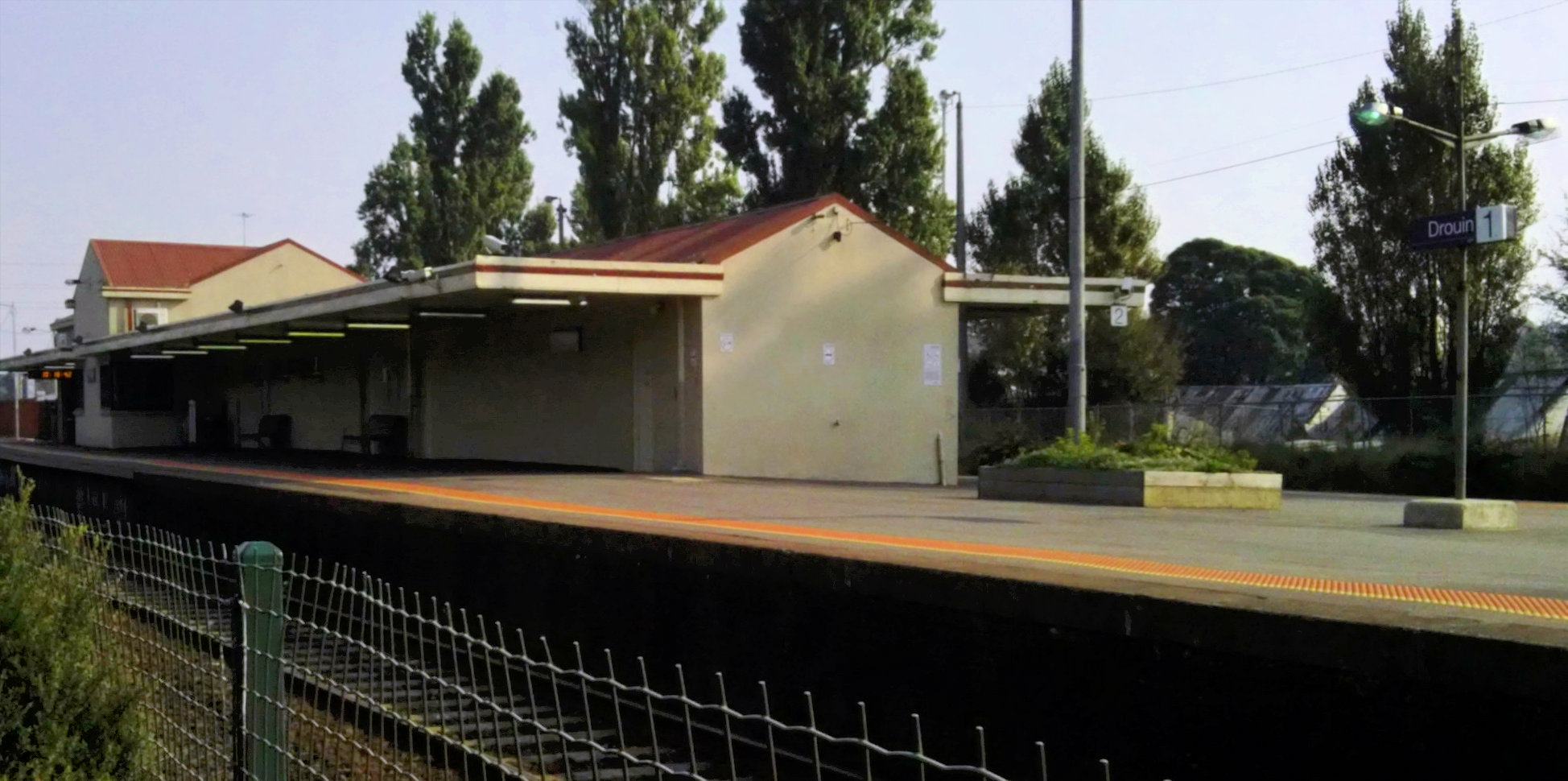
- Westbound view of station building and Platform 1, March 2015

General information
- Location: Francis Avenue, Drouin, Victoria 3818; Shire of Baw Baw; Australia
- Coordinates: 38°08′09″S 145°51′19″E
- System: PTV regional rail station
- Owner: VicTrack
- Operator: V/Line
- Line: Gippsland
- Distance: 92.22 kilometres from Southern Cross
- Platforms: 2 (1 island)
- Tracks: 2
- Connections: Bus

Construction
- Structure type: At-grade
- Parking: Yes
- Cycle facilities: Yes
- Accessible: Yes

Other information
- Status: Operational, staffed part-time
- Station code: DRO
- Fare zone: Myki zone 6
- Website: Public Transport Victoria

History
- Opened: 1 March 1878; 148 years ago

Services
Preceding station	V/Line	Following station
Longwarry towards Southern Cross	Gippsland line	Warragul towards Traralgon or Bairnsdale
Garfield towards Southern Cross	Gippsland line Bairnsdale express	Warragul towards Bairnsdale
Location
- Location within Victoria

Drouin railway station is a regional railway station on the Gippsland line, part of the Victorian railway network. It serves the town of Drouin, in Victoria, Australia. Drouin station is a ground level unstaffed station, featuring an island platform with two faces. It opened on 1 March 1878.

== History ==
Drouin opened on 1 March 1878, when the line was extended from Bunyip to Moe. The station, like the township itself, was supposedly named after a Frenchman invented a chlorination process for the extraction of gold and metals from ore, or an Aboriginal word meaning 'north wind'.

In 1950, the line to Warragul was duplicated, and in 1952, duplication of the line to Longwarry occurred. The present island platform was provided in 1958.

The signal box at Drouin closed in February 1988, with the block post abolished, all fixed signals covered and lights extinguished. The interlocked signal frame was also abolished. By October 1989, all former sidings and crossovers, and the associated overhead wire, were abolished, effectively leaving Drouin as a "through" station.

In 2006, the station building underwent a refurbishment. During this time, it received Viclink purple station signage, the first station on the regional rail network to receive this signage.

== Platforms and services ==
Drouin has one island platform with two faces. It is serviced by V/Line Traralgon and Bairnsdale line services.

Drouin platform arrangement
Platform	Line	Destination
1	Traralgon line Bairnsdale line	Southern Cross, Traralgon, Bairnsdale
2	Traralgon line Bairnsdale line	Southern Cross, Traralgon, Bairnsdale

== Transport links ==
Warragul Bus Lines operates four routes via Drouin station, under contract to Public Transport Victoria:

- 85 : to Warragul station
- 86 : to Drouin North
- Garfield station – Traralgon Plaza
- Traralgon station – Drouin North
