= Longwarry railway station =

Railway station in Longwarry, Victoria, Australia

Longwarry
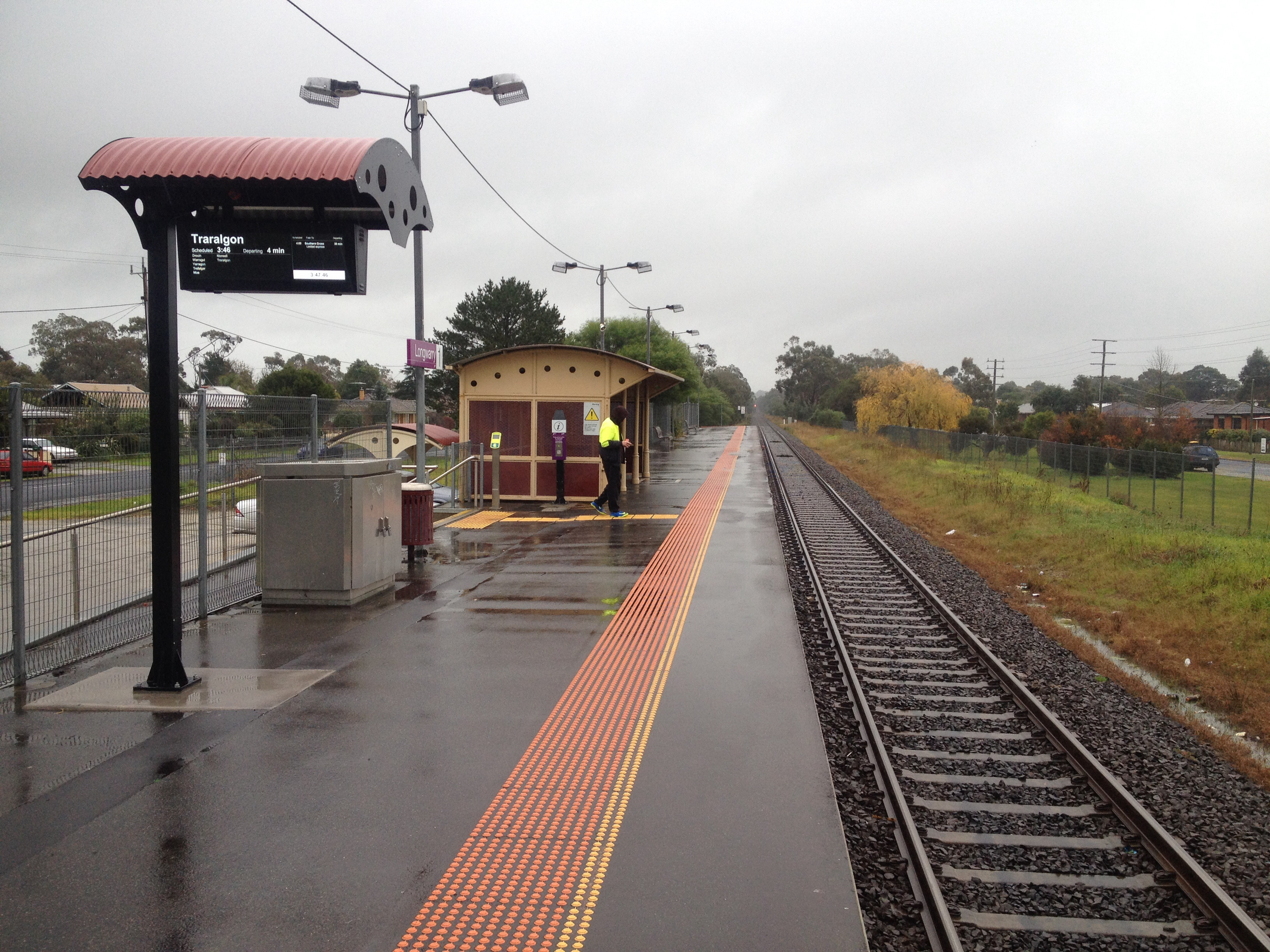
- Westbound view from station platform, June 2016

General information
- Location: Nar Nar Goon–Longwarry Road, Longwarry, Victoria 3816; Shire of Baw Baw; Australia
- Coordinates: 38°06′45″S 145°46′14″E
- System: PTV regional rail station
- Owner: VicTrack
- Operator: V/Line
- Line: Gippsland
- Distance: 83.49 kilometres from Southern Cross
- Platforms: 2 side
- Tracks: 2
- Connections: Bus

Construction
- Structure type: At-grade
- Parking: Yes
- Accessible: Yes

Other information
- Status: Operational, unstaffed
- Station code: LWY
- Fare zone: Myki zone 5/6
- Website: Public Transport Victoria

History
- Opened: 1 July 1881; 145 years ago

Services
Preceding station	V/Line	Following station
Bunyip towards Southern Cross	Gippsland line	Drouin towards Traralgon or Bairnsdale
Location
- Location within Victoria

Longwarry railway station is a regional railway station on the Gippsland line, part of the V/Line network. It serves the town of Longwarry, in Victoria, Australia. Longwarry station is a ground level unstaffed station, featuring two side platforms. It opened on 1 July 1881.

== History ==
The track east of the station to Drouin was duplicated in 1952, but the section between Bunyip and Longwarry remained single track for several decades because the bridge over the Bunyip River has not been duplicated. The line through Longwarry to Warragul was electrified in July 1954, but electrification was removed in December 1998.

On 26 August 1988, the electric staff safeworking system between Longwarry and Bunyip was abolished, and was replaced with automatic three-position signalling. The double line block system between Longwarry and Warragul was also abolished, along with the signal box and all two position signals. At the same time, boom barriers were provided at the Yannathan Road level crossing, replacing hand-operated gates. By October 1989, the connections to the former goods siding was abolished, as was the overhead wire above the siding.

As part of the Regional Rail Revival project, a second platform was built at the station, and the line between Bunyip and Longwarry was duplicated, with the project originally being scheduled for completion in late 2022. Duplication works would later be completed in June 2024.

== Platforms and services ==
Longwarry has two platforms. The second of which commenced operations in 2024. It is served by V/Line Traralgon and selected Bairnsdale line trains.

Longwarry platform arrangement
Platform	Line	Destination
1	Traralgon line Bairnsdale line	Southern Cross, Traralgon, Bairnsdale
2	Traralgon line Bairnsdale line	Southern Cross, Traralgon, Bairnsdale

== Transport links ==
Warragul Bus Lines operates one route via Longwarry station:

- Garfield station – Traralgon Centre Plaza
