= Nar Nar Goon railway station =

Railway station in Victoria, Australia

Nar Nar Goon
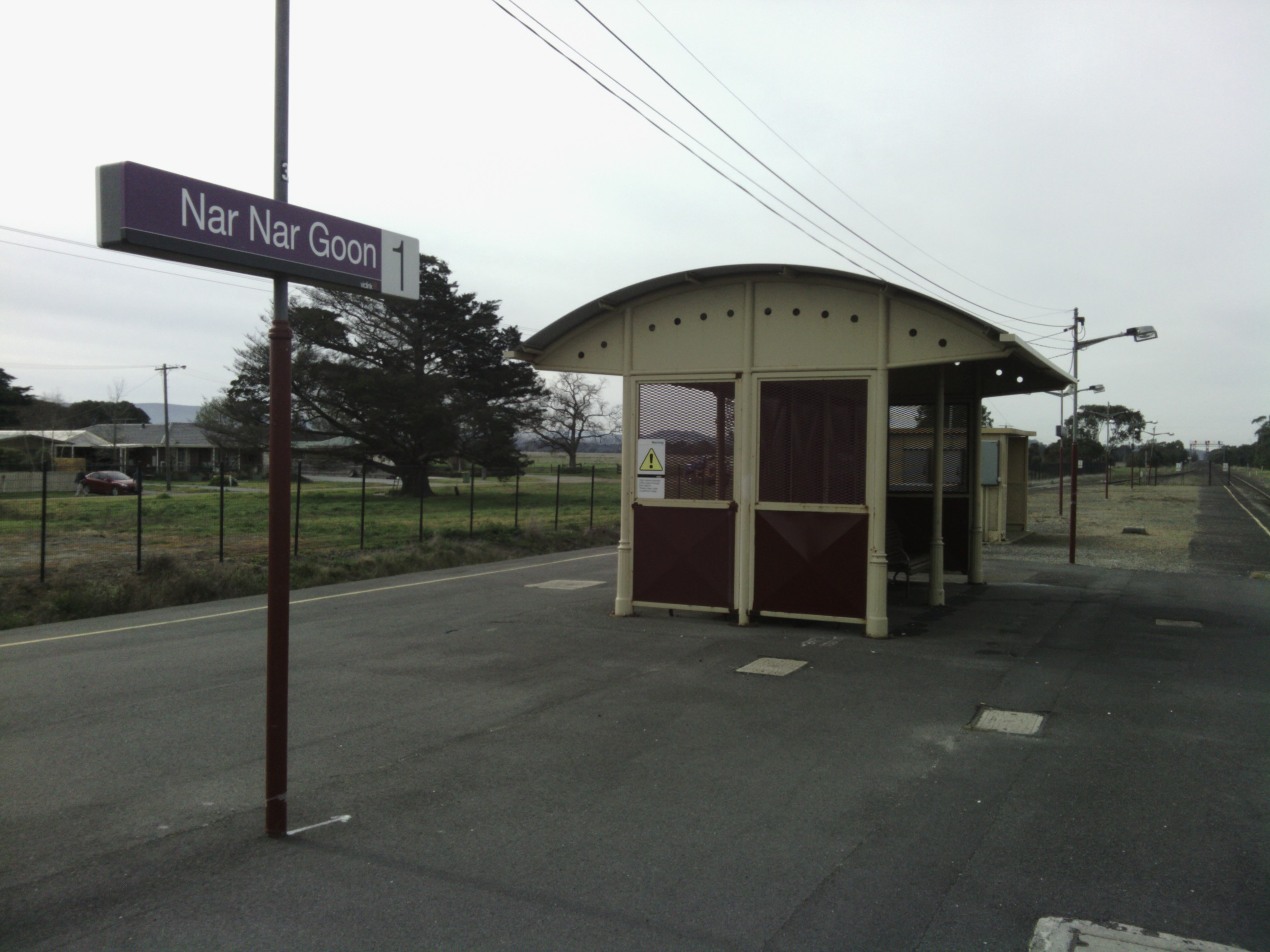
- Eastbound view from Platform 1, July 2013

General information
- Location: Station Street, Nar Nar Goon, Victoria 3812; Shire of Cardinia; Australia
- Coordinates: 38°04′54″S 145°34′20″E
- System: PTV regional rail station
- Owner: VicTrack
- Operator: V/Line
- Line: Gippsland
- Distance: 65.81 kilometres from Southern Cross
- Platforms: 2 (1 island)
- Tracks: 2
- Connections: Bus

Construction
- Structure type: At-grade
- Parking: Yes
- Accessible: Yes

Other information
- Status: Operational, unstaffed
- Station code: NNG
- Fare zone: Myki zone 3/4
- Website: Public Transport Victoria

History
- Opened: 1 April 1881; 145 years ago

Services
Preceding station	V/Line	Following station
Pakenham towards Southern Cross	Gippsland line	Tynong towards Traralgon or Bairnsdale
Disruptions Only
Preceding station	V/Line	Following station
East Pakenham Terminus	Gippsland line	Tynong towards Traralgon or Bairnsdale
Location
- Location within Victoria

Nar Nar Goon railway station is a regional railway station operated by V/Line on the Gippsland line, part of the Victoria rail network. It serves the town of Nar Nar Goon, in Victoria, Australia. Nar Nar Goon is a ground-level unstaffed station, featuring an island platform with two faces. The station opened on 1 April 1881.

== History ==
In 1953, the line between Nar Nar Goon and Tynong was duplicated. In 1954, the line to Pakenham was duplicated, electrification of the line between Pakenham and Warragul occurred, and a signal panel was provided. In 1958, the present island platform was provided.

In 1993, siding "A" was abolished, as was a crossover and the up end connection to the former goods yard, with No.2 road baulked at the down end of the Koo Wee Rup Road level crossing. In 1996, No.3 road was abolished, and No.2 road was shortened in length. In 1999, all remaining points were removed.

In 1998, electrified services between Pakenham and Warragul ceased, with de-electrification between those stations occurring in 2001.

On 28 April 2006, the signal panel at the station was abolished.

== Platforms and services ==
Nar Nar Goon has one island platform with two faces. It is serviced by V/Line Traralgon and selected Bairnsdale line services.

Nar Nar Goon platform arrangement
Platform	Line	Destination	Via	Service Type	Note	Source
1	Traralgon line Bairnsdale line	Southern Cross	Dandenong	All stations	Select services terminate at Flinders Street.	
2	Traralgon line Bairnsdale line	Traralgon, Bairnsdale	Warragul	All stations		

== Transport links ==
Warragul Bus Lines operates two routes via Nar Nar Goon station, under contract to Public Transport Victoria:

- to Garfield station
- Pakenham station – Garfield station
