= Dandenong railway station =

Railway station in Melbourne, Australia

Dandenong
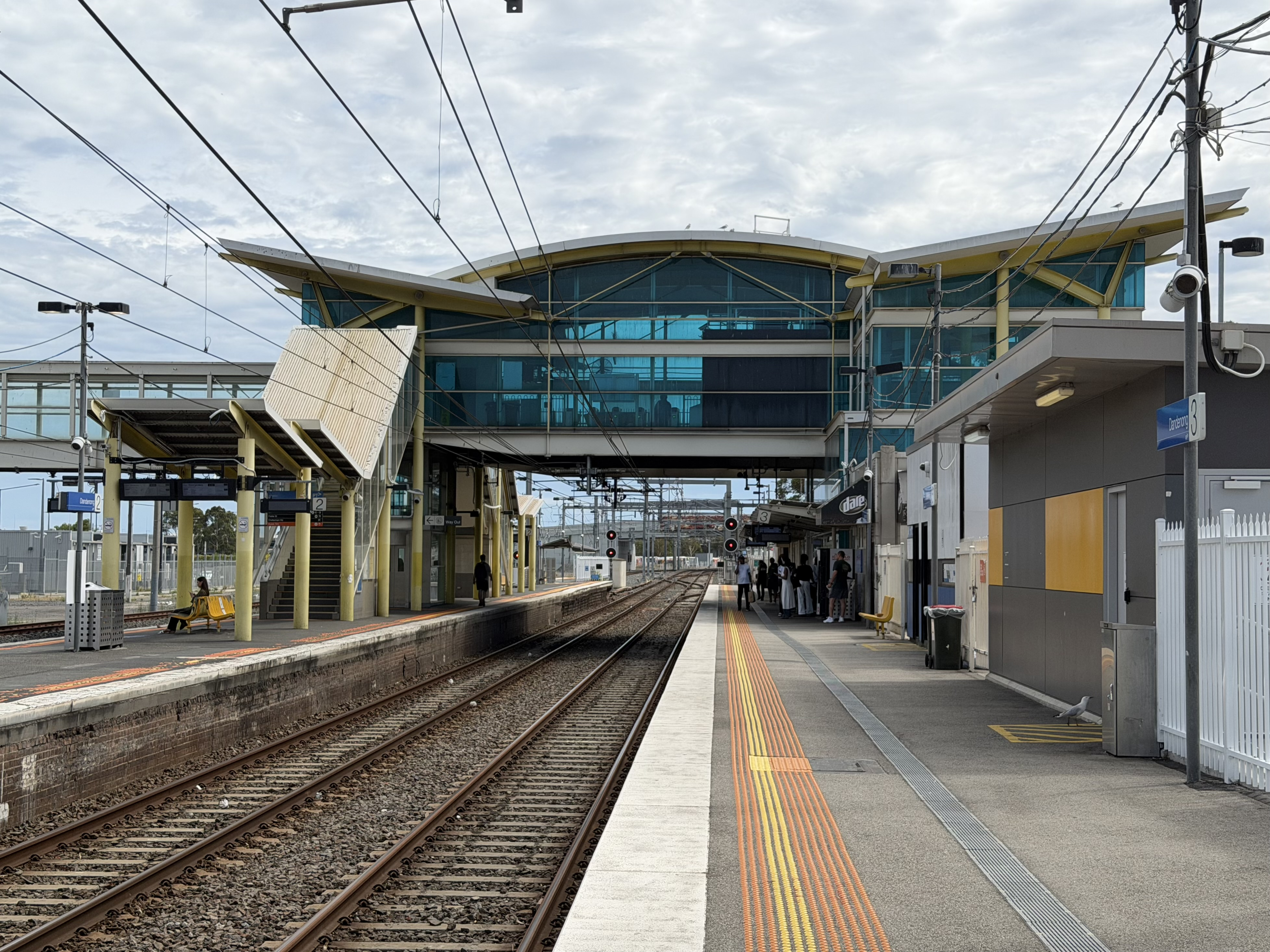
- North-west-bound view from Platform 3 in February 2026

General information
- Location: Rudduck Street, Dandenong, Victoria 3175; City of Greater Dandenong; Australia
- Coordinates: 37°59′24″S 145°12′35″E
- System: PTV commuter and regional rail station
- Owner: VicTrack
- Operator: Metro Trains
- Lines: Cranbourne Pakenham; Gippsland
- Distance: 31.19 kilometres from Southern Cross
- Platforms: 3 (2 side, 1 island)
- Tracks: 9
- Train operators: Metro Trains; V/Line
- Connections: Bus; Coach

Construction
- Structure type: At-grade
- Parking: 300 spaces
- Cycle facilities: 12 racks
- Accessible: No — steep ramp

Other information
- Status: Operational, premium station
- Station code: DNG
- Fare zone: Myki zone 2
- Website: Public Transport Victoria

History
- Opened: 8 October 1877; 148 years ago
- Rebuilt: 1975; 24 March 1995
- Electrified: December 1922 (1500 V DC overhead)

Passengers
- 2005–2006: 1,749,164
- 2006–2007: 1,956,212 ▲11.83%
- 2007–2008: 2,208,117 ▲12.87%
- 2008–2009: 2,469,632 ▲11.84%
- 2009–2010: 2,406,134 ▼2.57%
- 2010–2011: 2,544,899 ▲5.76%
- 2011–2012: 2,657,623 ▲4.42%
- 2012–2013: Not measured
- 2013–2014: 2,390,722 ▼10.04%
- 2014–2015: 2,403,533 ▲0.53%
- 2015–2016: 2,329,886 ▼3.06%
- 2016–2017: 2,374,824 ▲1.92%
- 2017–2018: 2,190,679 ▼7.75%
- 2018–2019: 2,165,203 ▼1.16%
- 2019–2020: 1,819,050 ▼15.98%
- 2020–2021: 1,159,900 ▼36.23%
- 2021–2022: 1,234,650 ▲6.44%
- 2022–2023: 1,738,900 ▲40.84%
- 2023–2024: 2,073,300 ▲19.23%
- 2023–2024: 1,970,750 ▼4.95%

Services
Preceding station	Metro Trains	Following station
Yarraman towards Watergardens or Sunbury via Metro Tunnel	Cranbourne line	Lynbrook towards Cranbourne
Yarraman towards Watergardens or Sunbury via Metro Tunnel	Pakenham line	Hallam towards East Pakenham
Preceding station	V/Line	Following station
Clayton towards Southern Cross	Gippsland line	Berwick 1 weekday peak service towards Traralgon
Clayton towards Southern Cross	Gippsland line	Pakenham towards Traralgon or Bairnsdale
Caulfield towards Southern Cross	Gippsland line Bairnsdale express	Pakenham towards Bairnsdale
Former services
Preceding station	M-Train	Following station
Yarraman towards Flinders Street	Pakenham line	General Motors towards Pakenham
Preceding station	VicRail	Following station
Springvale towards Spencer Street	South Gippsland line	Lyndhurst towards Yarram
Preceding station	V/Line	Following station
Springvale towards Spencer Street	South Gippsland line	Cranbourne towards Leongatha
Track layout
Location

Dandenong station is a railway station operated by Metro Trains Melbourne and V/Line on the Pakenham, Cranbourne and Gippsland lines, part of the Melbourne and Victorian rail networks. It serves the south-eastern suburb of Dandenong, in Melbourne, Victoria, Australia. Dandenong station is a ground level premium station, featuring three platforms, an island platform with two faces and one side platform. It opened on 8 October 1877, with the current station provided in March 1995.

A number of train stabling sidings are located near the station, including to the north of the station on either side of the railway line, as well as parallel to the platforms. A little-used goods yard was once located to the south of the station.

The disused General Motors station was situated between Dandenong and Hallam.

== History ==
Dandenong opened as one of the original stations on the Melbourne to Sale railway line. In 1892, the South Gippsland line opened from Dandenong. Like the suburb itself, the station name derives either from an Indigenous word believed to mean "lofty mountains", or the Woiwurrung word "Tanjenong", which was the name of a local creek.

In 1922, the line from Oakleigh to Dandenong was electrified. In 1954, electrification was extended to Warragul, then onwards to Traralgon. Trains beyond Dandenong were generally hauled by L class electric locomotives, and were principally used for passenger services and briquette traffic, using coal from the large open cut coal mines in the Latrobe Valley. In 1956, the line was duplicated to Narre Warren.

In 1972, the down end of Platform 1 was extended. On 19 January 1975, electrified suburban services were extended to Pakenham. Occurring in that year, the station buildings were reconstructed.

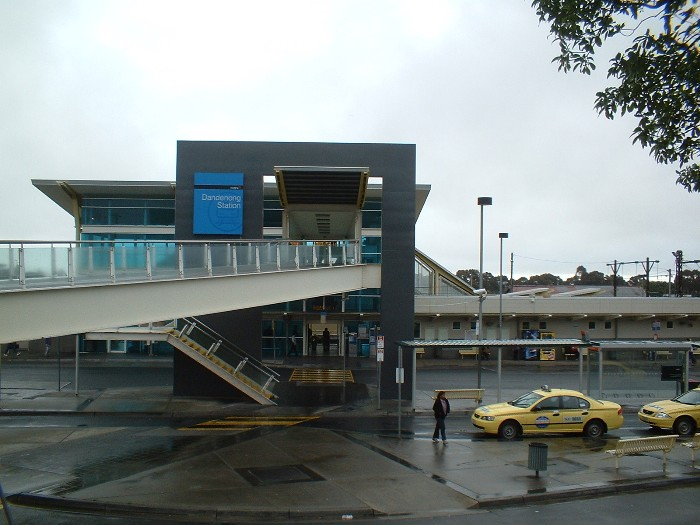
The 1994/1995 rebuilt station entrance and building, November 2005

Between 1994 and 1995, the station was again rebuilt, as part of the Cranbourne electrification project. The rebuild included the demolition of the former Southern Aurora Hotel (completed in May 1993), the removal of the former timber station building (completed in April 1994), and filling-in the pedestrian underpass at the down end of the station. On 24 March 1995, the rebuilt station was opened by the then Prime Minister Paul Keating.

During the 2017/2018 financial year, Dandenong was the twelfth-busiest station on Melbourne's metropolitan network, with almost 2.2 million passenger movements.

== Facilities, platforms and services ==
Dandenong has one side platform and one island platform with two faces. Access to the platforms is provided by stairs and lifts from an overhead concourse. The side platform (Platform 3) has a kiosk and an enclosed waiting room, containing a customer service window and toilets.

Dandenong is served by Cranbourne and Pakenham line trains, and by V/Line Traralgon and Bairnsdale trains.

Up until mid-late 2019, the unique configuration of the tracks at both ends of the station allowed trains to depart from any platform, in any direction. Since then, Pakenham bound services can no longer depart from Platform 1.

=== Metropolitan ===
Dandenong platform arrangement
Platform	Line	Destination	Via	Service Type	Notes	Source
1	Cranbourne line Pakenham line	Sunbury, Watergardens, West Footscray	Town Hall	All stations and limited express services		
1	Cranbourne line	Cranbourne		All stations	Night Network shuttle services.	
2	Cranbourne line Pakenham line	Sunbury, Watergardens, West Footscray	Town Hall	All stations and limited express services		
3	Cranbourne line Pakenham line	East Pakenham, Cranbourne		All stations		

=== Regional ===
Dandenong platform arrangement
Platform	Line	Destination	Via	Service Pattern
2	Gippsland line	Southern Cross	Flinders Street	Set down only
3	Gippsland line	Traralgon, Bairnsdale		Pick up only

== Transport links ==
Cranbourne Transit operates three bus routes to and from Dandenong station, under contract to Public Transport Victoria:

- 890 : to Lynbrook station
- 892 : to Casey Central
- 893 : to Cranbourne Park Shopping Centre

Kinetic Melbourne operates one SmartBus route via Dandenong station, under contract to Public Transport Victoria:

- SmartBus 901 : Frankston station – Melbourne Airport

Ventura Bus Lines operates twenty routes via Dandenong station, under contract to Public Transport Victoria:

- 800 : to Chadstone Shopping Centre
- 802 : to Chadstone Shopping Centre
- 804 : to Chadstone Shopping Centre
- 811 : to Brighton
- 812 : to Brighton
- 813 : to Waverley Gardens Shopping Centre
- 814 : to Springvale South
- 828 : Hampton station – Berwick station
- 843 : to Endeavour Hills
- 844 : to Doveton
- 845 : to Endeavour Hills
- 848 : to Brandon Park Shopping Centre
- 850 : to Glen Waverley station
- 857 : to Chelsea station
- 861 : to Endeavour Hills
- 862 : to Chadstone Shopping Centre
- Night Bus 978 : to Clayton station (Saturday and Sunday mornings only)
- Night Bus 979 : to Clayton station (Saturday and Sunday mornings only)
- Night Bus 981 : to Cranbourne (Saturday and Sunday mornings only)
- Night Bus 982 : to Cranbourne (Saturday and Sunday mornings only)

V/Line operates two coach services to and from Dandenong station:

- Cowes
- Inverloch
