= Moe railway station =

Railway station in Victoria, Australia

Moe
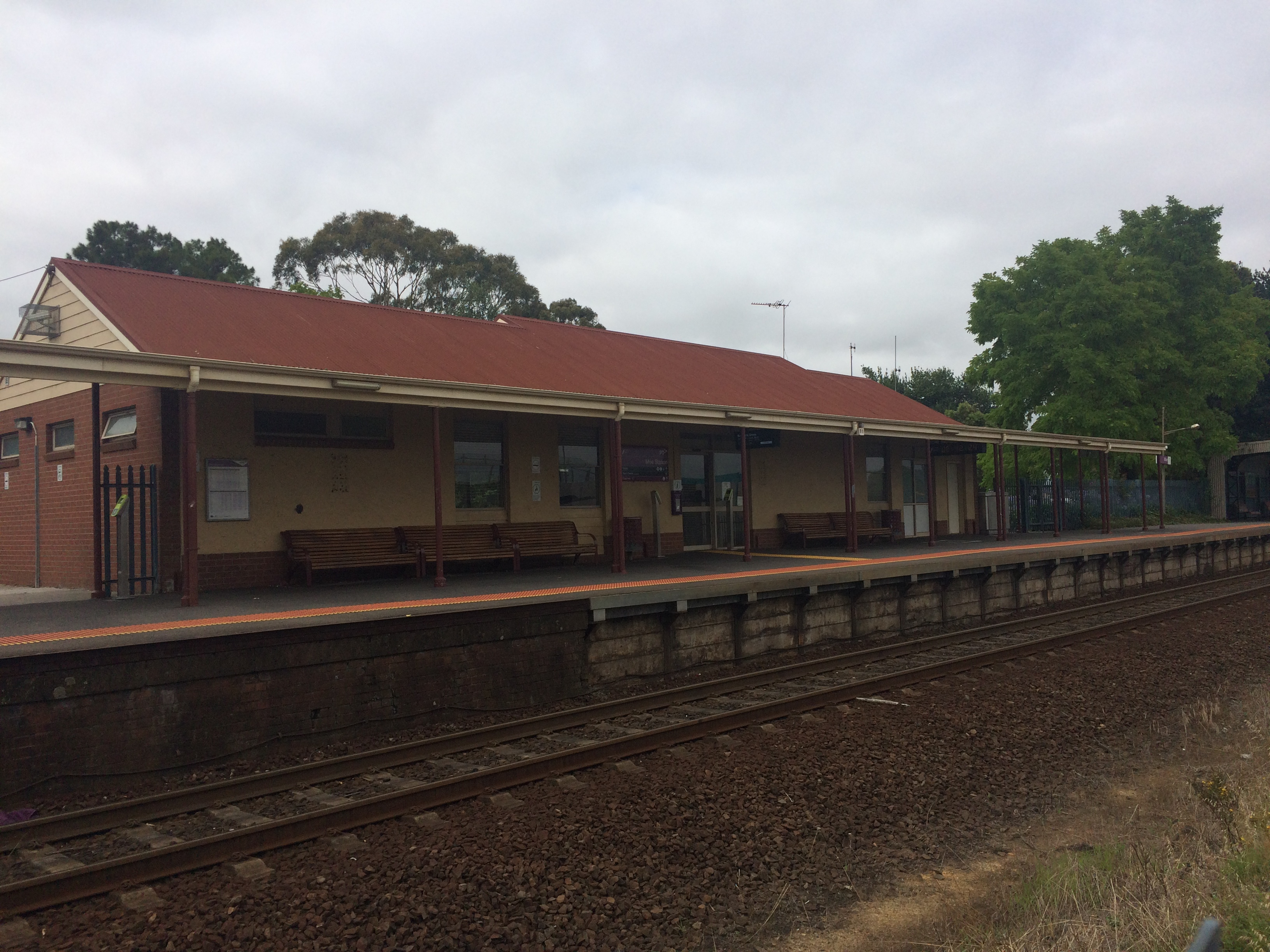
- Southbound view of the station building, January 2017

General information
- Location: Lloyd Street, Moe, Victoria 3825; City of Latrobe; Australia
- Coordinates: 38°10′37″S 146°15′38″E
- System: PTV regional rail station
- Owner: VicTrack
- Operator: V/Line
- Line: Gippsland
- Distance: 130.23 kilometres from Southern Cross
- Platforms: 1
- Tracks: 1
- Connections: Bus

Construction
- Structure type: At-grade
- Parking: 30 spaces
- Cycle facilities: Available
- Accessible: Yes

Other information
- Status: Operational, staffed
- Station code: MOE
- Fare zone: Myki zone 9/10
- Website: Public Transport Victoria

History
- Opened: 1 March 1878; 148 years ago
- Rebuilt: 1991/1992

Services
Preceding station	V/Line	Following station
Trafalgar towards Southern Cross	Gippsland line	Morwell towards Traralgon or Bairnsdale
Warragul towards Southern Cross	Gippsland line Bairnsdale express	Morwell towards Bairnsdale
Former services
Preceding station	Disused railways	Following station
Terminus	Walhalla line	Gooding
Terminus	Thorpdale line	David
Terminus	Yallourn line	Yallourn
Location
- Location within Victoria

Moe railway station is a regional railway station on the Gippsland line, part of the Victorian railway network. It serves the town of Moe, in Victoria, Australia. Moe station is a ground level unstaffed station, featuring an island platform with two faces. It opened on 1 March 1878.

It was formerly the junction station for the narrow gauge Walhalla line and the broad gauge Thorpdale and Yallourn lines.

In 1955, electrification was extended to the station and Yallourn from Warragul, and the following year, it was extended to Traralgon.

A 70 ft. turntable also existed at Moe until 1963, when it was dismantled. In 1964, siding "B" at the station was abolished. In 1966, the electric staff signalling was abolished between Moe and Morwell, and was replaced with Automatic and Track Control.

By 1987, the line to Yallourn was closed. In 1989, the signal box, interlocking, signals and goods yard was abolished.

Construction of the current station building commenced in late 1991, and was completed in 1992, with the former station building demolished shortly after.

== Platforms and services ==
Moe has one platform. It is serviced by V/Line Traralgon and Bairnsdale line services.

Moe platform arrangement
Platform	Line	Destination
1	Traralgon line Bairnsdale line	Southern Cross, Traralgon, Bairnsdale

== Transport links ==
Latrobe Valley Bus Lines operates eight routes via Moe station, under contract to Public Transport Victoria:

- 1 : Moe – Traralgon
- 5 : Moe – Traralgon
- 8 : to Traralgon
- 11 : Moe – Moe West
- 12 : Moe – Moe South
- 13 : Moe – Moe North
- 14 : Moe – Newborough
- 15 : Moe – Newborough

Warragul Bus Lines operates two routes via Moe station, under contract to Public Transport Victoria:

- Garfield station – Traralgon Plaza
- Traralgon station – Drouin North
