= Bunyip railway station =

Railway station in Bunyip, Victoria, Australia

Bunyip
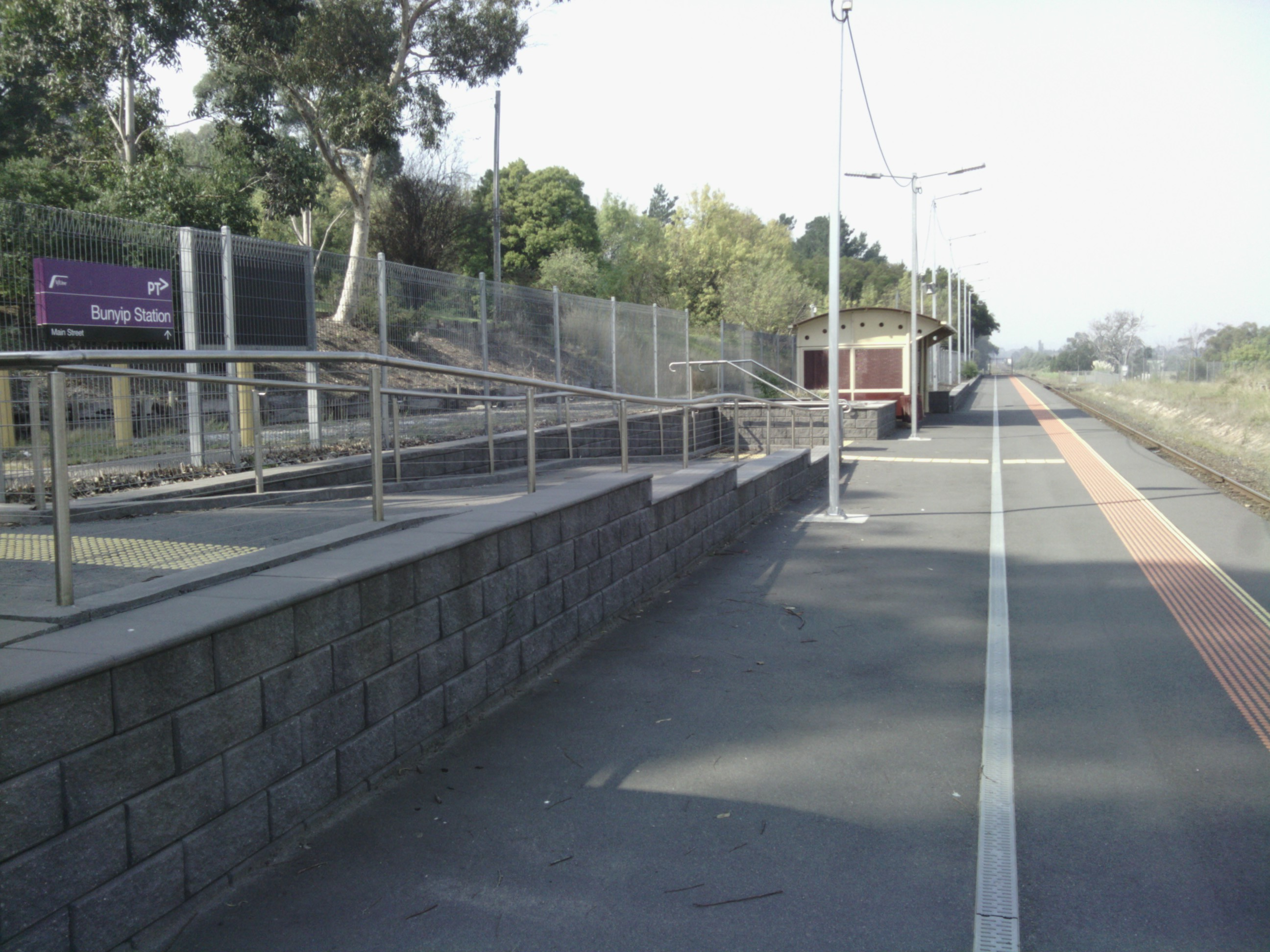
- Eastbound view from the original station platform, prior to the new Platform 1 been built, March 2015

General information
- Location: Nar Nar Goon–Longwarry Road, Bunyip, Victoria 3815; Shire of Cardinia; Australia
- Coordinates: 38°05′56″S 145°43′15″E
- System: PTV regional rail station
- Owner: VicTrack
- Operator: V/Line
- Line: Gippsland
- Distance: 79.09 km (49.14 mi) from Southern Cross
- Platforms: 2
- Tracks: 2
- Connections: Bus

Construction
- Structure type: At-grade
- Parking: Yes
- Accessible: Yes

Other information
- Status: Operational, unstaffed
- Station code: BYP
- Fare zone: Myki zone 4/5
- Website: Public Transport Victoria

History
- Opened: 8 October 1877; 148 years ago
- Rebuilt: 13 June 2024 (Regional Rail Revival)

Services
Preceding station	V/Line	Following station
Garfield towards Southern Cross	Gippsland line	Longwarry towards Traralgon or Bairnsdale
Location
- Location within Victoria

Bunyip railway station is a regional railway station on the Gippsland line, part of the Victorian railway network. It serves the town of Bunyip, in Victoria, Australia. Bunyip station is a ground level unstaffed station, featuring two side platforms. It opened on 8 October 1877, with the current station provided in 2024.

A substation and a short section of the overhead wiring, both of which are listed on the Victorian Heritage Register, have been retained to the west of the station.

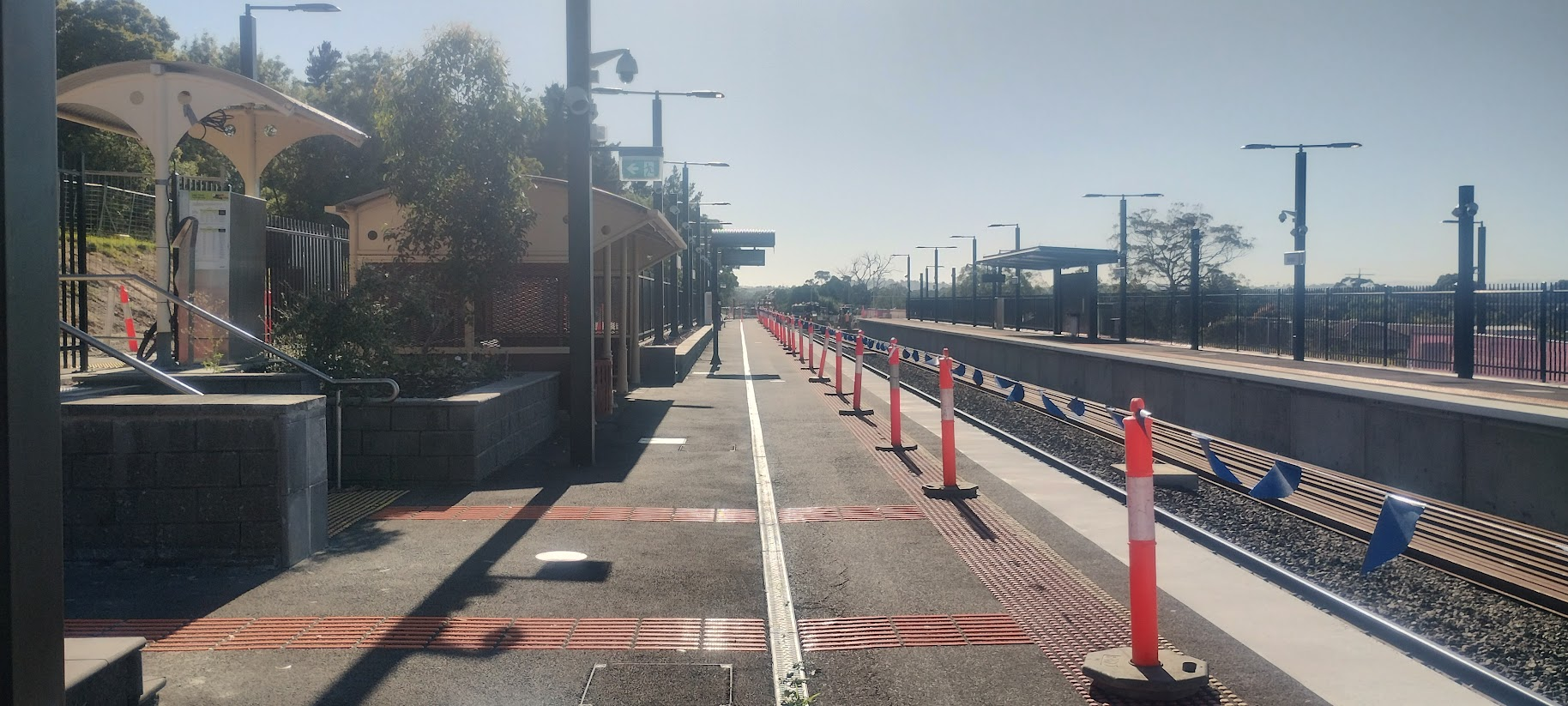
Bunyip station during construction, January 2023

== History ==
The line through Bunyip was electrified in July 1954, but the electrification was switched off between Bunyip and Warragul in December 1998, and between Pakenham and Bunyip in 2005, as part of the Regional Fast Rail project. The track up to the western (up) end of the station was duplicated in 1956.

On 26 August 1988, the electric staff system between Bunyip and Longwarry was abolished, and was replaced with automatic three-position signalling. The signal box, interlocking, and all two-position signals, were also abolished.

The station was de-staffed on 26 May 1991.

In 2022, as part of the Regional Rail Revival project, the former goods and stock platform and crane were removed to make way for duplicated track and a new second platform. The siding for the goods platform was removed in April 1988.

In April 2017, the Victorian state government announced an upgrade project to the Gippsland line as part of the Regional Rail Revival package. A second platform would be constructed at Bunyip, along with duplicated track from Bunyip to Longwarry. However, it was reported in May 2022, that track would not be duplicated over the Bunyip River. The new platform, renumbered to Platform 1, opened on 13 June 2024. The original platform was renumbered to Platform 2.

== Platforms and services ==
Bunyip has two platforms both served by V/Line Traralgon and selected Bairnsdale line trains.

Bunyip platform arrangement
Platform	Line	Destination
1	Traralgon line Bairnsdale line	Southern Cross
2	Traralgon line Bairnsdale line	Traralgon, Bairnsdale

== Transport links ==
Warragul Bus Lines operates one route via Bunyip station, under contract to Public Transport Victoria:

- Garfield station – Traralgon Plaza
