= Gippsland Railway =

Gippsland Railway may refer to:

- Gippsland railway line
- Gippsland V/Line rail service
