= LWY =

Live with Yourself! (LWY) is a science fiction comedy webtoon series by Andrew "Shen" Tsyaston and David J. Catman

LWY may also refer to:

- LWY, the IATA code for Lawas Airport, Sarawak, Malaysia
- LWY, the station code for Longwarry railway station, Victoria, Australia
