= Pakenham railway station =

Railway station in Melbourne, Australia

Pakenham
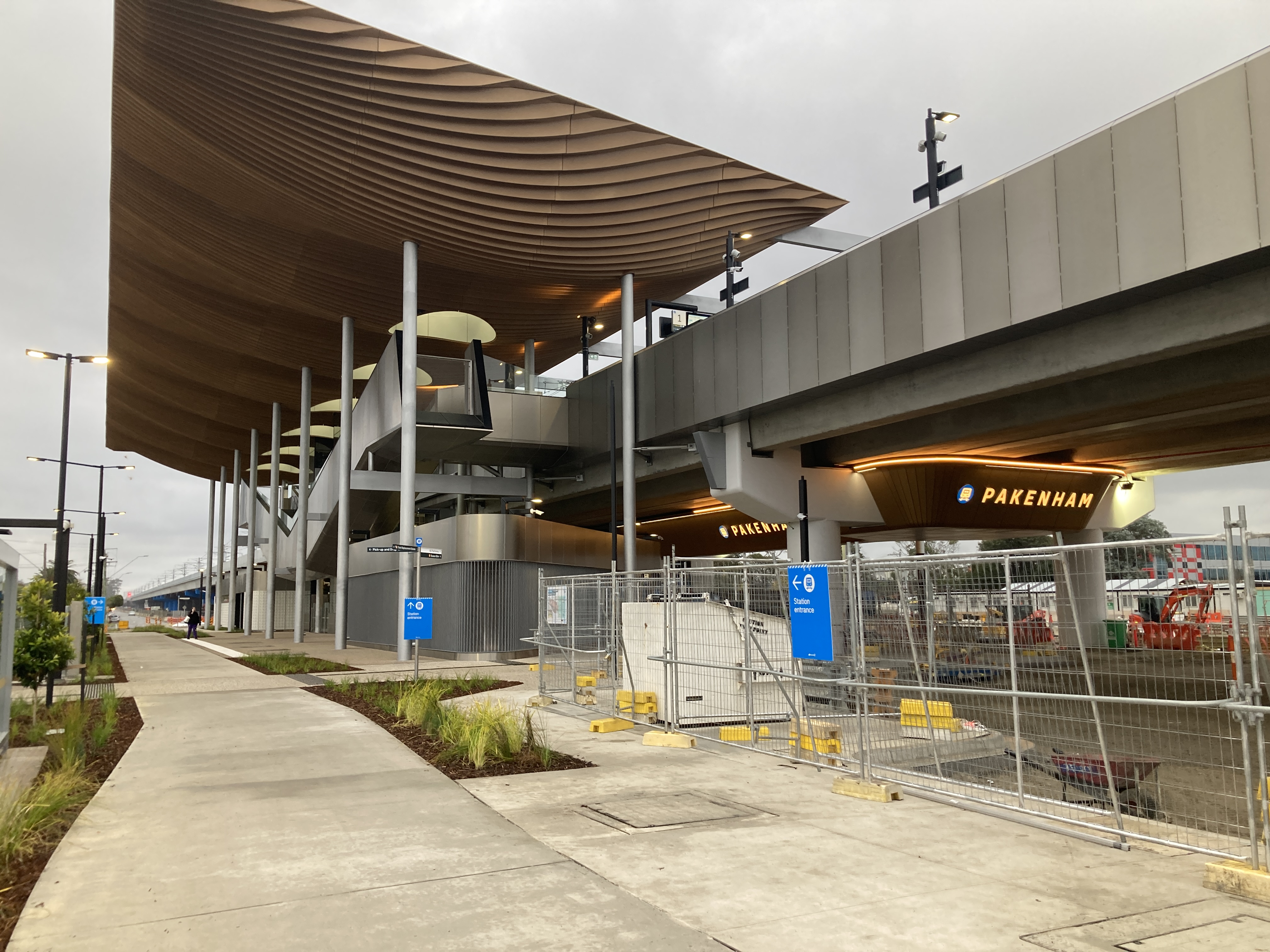
- The completed south side of the newly-rebuilt elevated station, June 2024

General information
- Location: Railway Avenue, Pakenham, Victoria 3810; Shire of Cardinia; Australia
- Coordinates: 38°04′49″S 145°29′09″E
- System: PTV commuter and regional rail station
- Owner: VicTrack
- Operator: Metro Trains; V/Line
- Lines: Pakenham; Gippsland
- Distance: 58.19 kilometres from Southern Cross
- Platforms: 2 side
- Tracks: 2
- Connections: Bus

Construction
- Structure type: Elevated
- Parking: 364 spaces
- Cycle facilities: Available
- Accessible: Yes—step free access

Other information
- Status: Operational, premium station
- Station code: PKM
- Fare zone: Myki zone 2
- Website: Public Transport Victoria

History
- Opened: 8 October 1877; 149 years ago
- Rebuilt: 1970; 3 June 2024 (LXRP)
- Electrified: July 1954 (1500 V DC overhead)

Passengers
- 2005–2006: 372,581
- 2006–2007: 418,935 ▲12.44%
- 2007–2008: 465,357 ▲11.08%
- 2008–2009: 566,307 ▲21.69%
- 2009–2010: 600,056 ▲5.95%
- 2010–2011: 646,991 ▲7.82%
- 2011–2012: 642,952 ▼0.62%
- 2012–2013: Not measured
- 2013–2014: 562,129 ▼12.57%
- 2014–2015: 559,719 ▼0.42%
- 2015–2016: 597,746 ▲6.79%
- 2016–2017: 586,421 ▼1.89%
- 2017–2018: 576,006 ▼1.77%
- 2018–2019: 489,255 ▼15.06%
- 2019–2020: 465,800 ▼4.79%
- 2020–2021: 280,300 ▼39.82%
- 2021–2022: 270,350 ▼3.54%
- 2022–2023: 398,000 ▲47.21%

Services
Preceding station	Metro Trains	Following station
Cardinia Road towards Watergardens or Sunbury via Metro Tunnel	Pakenham line	East Pakenham Terminus
V/Line Services
Preceding station	V/Line	Following station
Dandenong towards Southern Cross	Gippsland line Bairnsdale express	Garfield towards Bairnsdale
Dandenong towards Southern Cross	Gippsland line	Nar Nar Goon towards Traralgon or Bairnsdale
Berwick 1 weekday peak service towards Southern Cross	Gippsland line	Nar Nar Goon towards Traralgon
Track layout
Location
- Location within Melbourne

Pakenham station is a railway station operated by Metro Trains Melbourne and V/Line on the Pakenham and Gippsland lines, part of the Melbourne and Victorian rail networks. It serves the south-eastern Melbourne suburb of Pakenham in Victoria, Australia.

Pakenham is an elevated premium station, featuring two side platforms. It opened on 8 October 1877, with the current station provided in June 2024. Stabling facilities were located on the south side of the station, until their removal in 2022.

== History ==
Pakenham station opened when the railway line from Bunyip was extended to Oakleigh. Like the suburb itself, the station is named after Sir Edward Michael Pakenham, a major general who served in the Peninsular War.

In 1938, flashing light signals were provided at the former Main Street level crossing, which was located at the up end of the station.

Initially a single track, the line between Pakenham and Nar Nar Goon was duplicated in 1954. In 1955, the line between Pakenham and Officer was duplicated and an island platform was provided in 1959, when duplication occurred through the station.

On 19 January 1975, electrified suburban services were extended to the station. A crossover was also provided at the up end of the station around that time. During 1979–1980, the former ground level pebbledash station building was constructed.

On 16 April 1980, Pakenham was the scene of a collision between Hitachi carriage 353D and guards van 286ZL. The guards van was destroyed in the collision and the Hitachi carriage was later scrapped.

In 1986, boom barriers were provided at the Main Street level crossing.

On 15 March 1997, Pakenham was upgraded to a premium station. Between 2001 and 2024, it was the terminus of the Melbourne electrified rail network.

On 9 March 2011, a Siemens train over-ran No. 5 road near the station, crashing into a stanchion.

In March 2014, it was announced that a new train servicing facility would be built at Pakenham East, to maintain the new High Capacity Metro Trains.

In May 2024, the Main Street level crossing was grade separated, as part of the Level Crossing Removal Project. A rail bridge was built over the road, and included a new, rebuilt elevated station. As part of the project, Pakenham line services were extended by approximately 2 km (1.2 mi) to a new station at East Pakenham.

On 17 May 2024, McGregor Road, Main Street and Racecourse Road level crossings were eliminated. On the same night, the old ground-level Pakenham station was closed and demolished. The rebuilt Pakenham station and new East Pakenham station opened on 3 June 2024. At the time of reopening, the northern side of the station building (including platform 2) was only partially finished, with the platform only accessible via temporary stairs. Works will continue on the northern side for the construction of permanent stairs and lift until late 2024.

== Platforms and services ==
Pakenham has two side platforms. It is served by Pakenham line trains, and V/Line Traralgon and Bairnsdale line trains.

=== Metropolitan ===
Pakenham platform arrangement
Platform	Line	Destination	Via	Service Type	Notes	Source
1	Pakenham line	West Footscray, Watergardens or Sunbury	Town Hall	Limited express	Services to West Footscray only operate during weekday peaks.	
2	Pakenham line	East Pakenham		All stations		

=== Regional ===
Pakenham platform arrangement
Platform	Line	Destination	Via	Service Type	Notes	Source
1	Gippsland line	Southern Cross	Flinders Street	Limited express		
2	Gippsland line	Traralgon, Bairnsdale		All stations and limited express services		

== Transport links ==
Ventura Bus Lines operates six routes via Pakenham station, under contract to Public Transport Victoria:

- 840 : to Gembrook
- 925 : to Officer South (via Cardinia Road Station)
- 926 : to Westfield Fountain Gate
- 927 : to Pakenham North (via The Avenue)
- 928 : to Berwick station (via Cardinia Road Station)
- 929 : to Pakenham North (via Army Road and Windermere Boulevard)

Westernport Roadlines operates one bus route to and from Pakenham station, under contract to Public Transport Victoria:

- to Koo Wee Rup

== Gallery ==
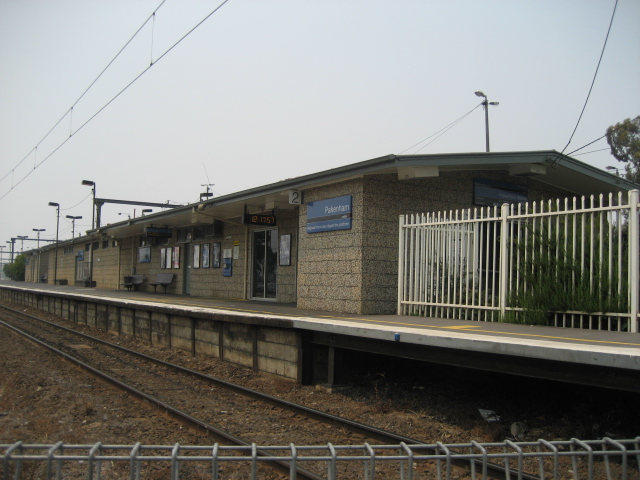
Eastbound view of former ground level Platform 2 and station building, December 2006

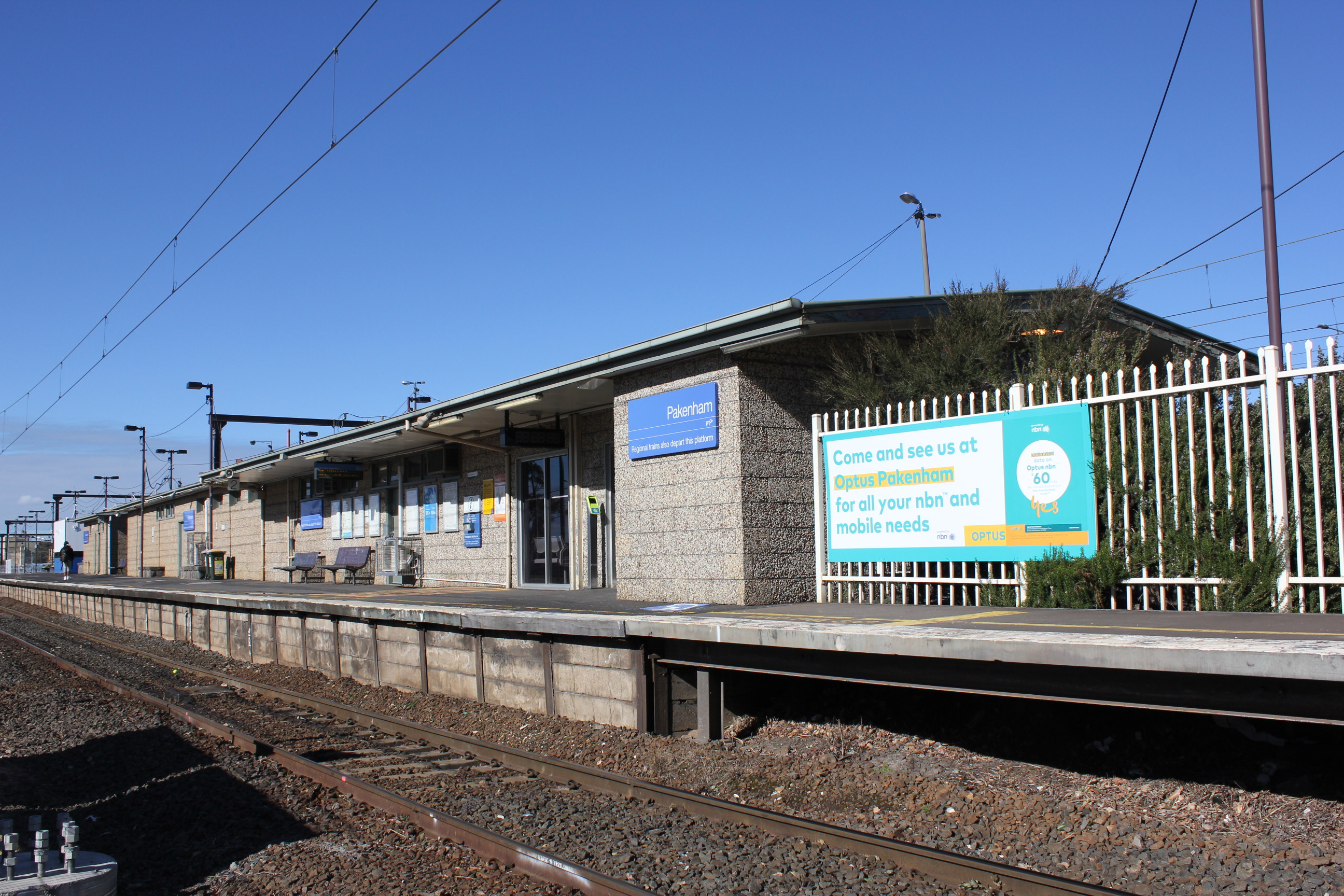
Eastbound view of former ground level Platform 2 and station building, July 2018

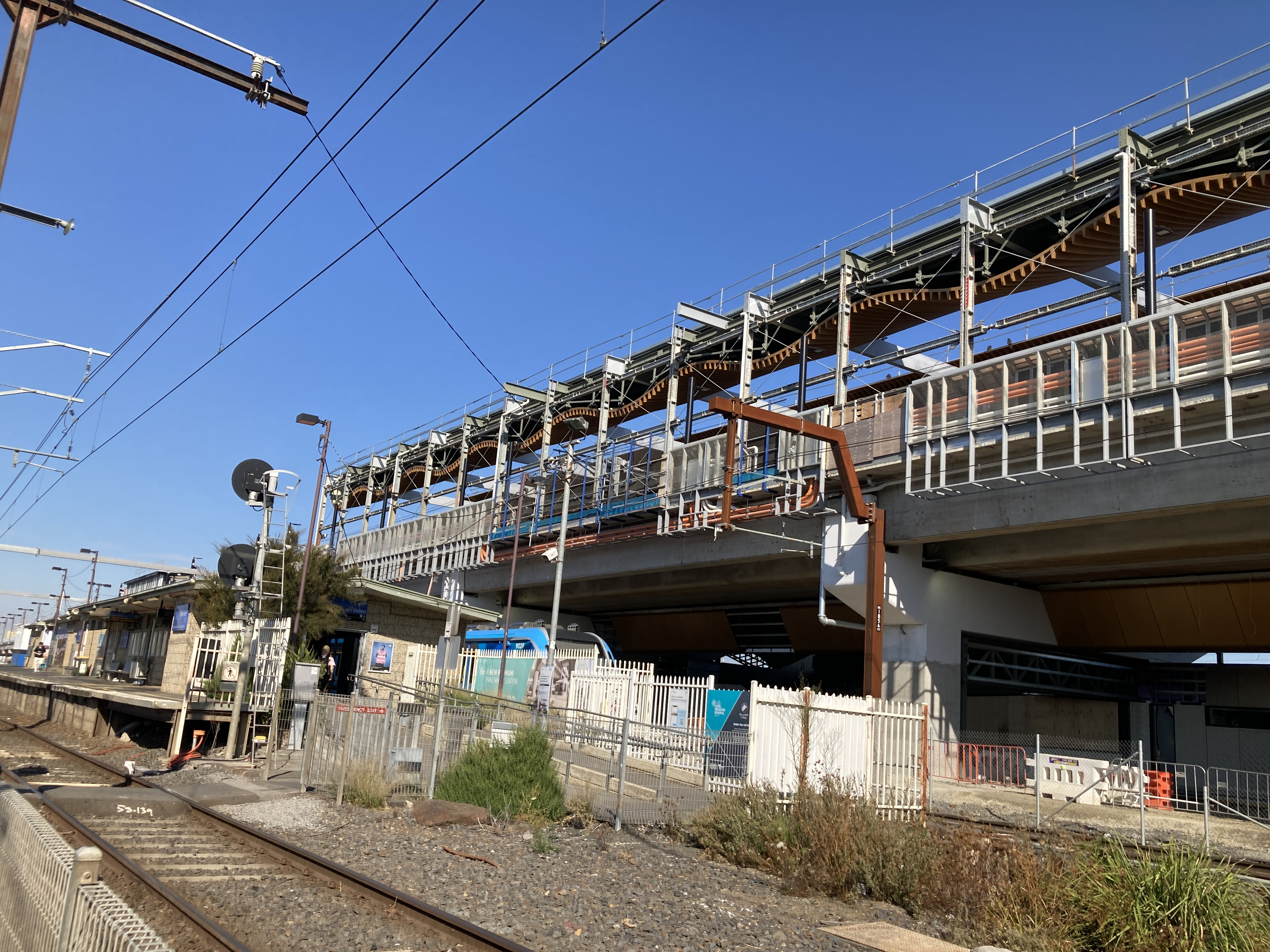
Eastbound view of former ground level Platform 2, showing new elevated station under construction, March 2024

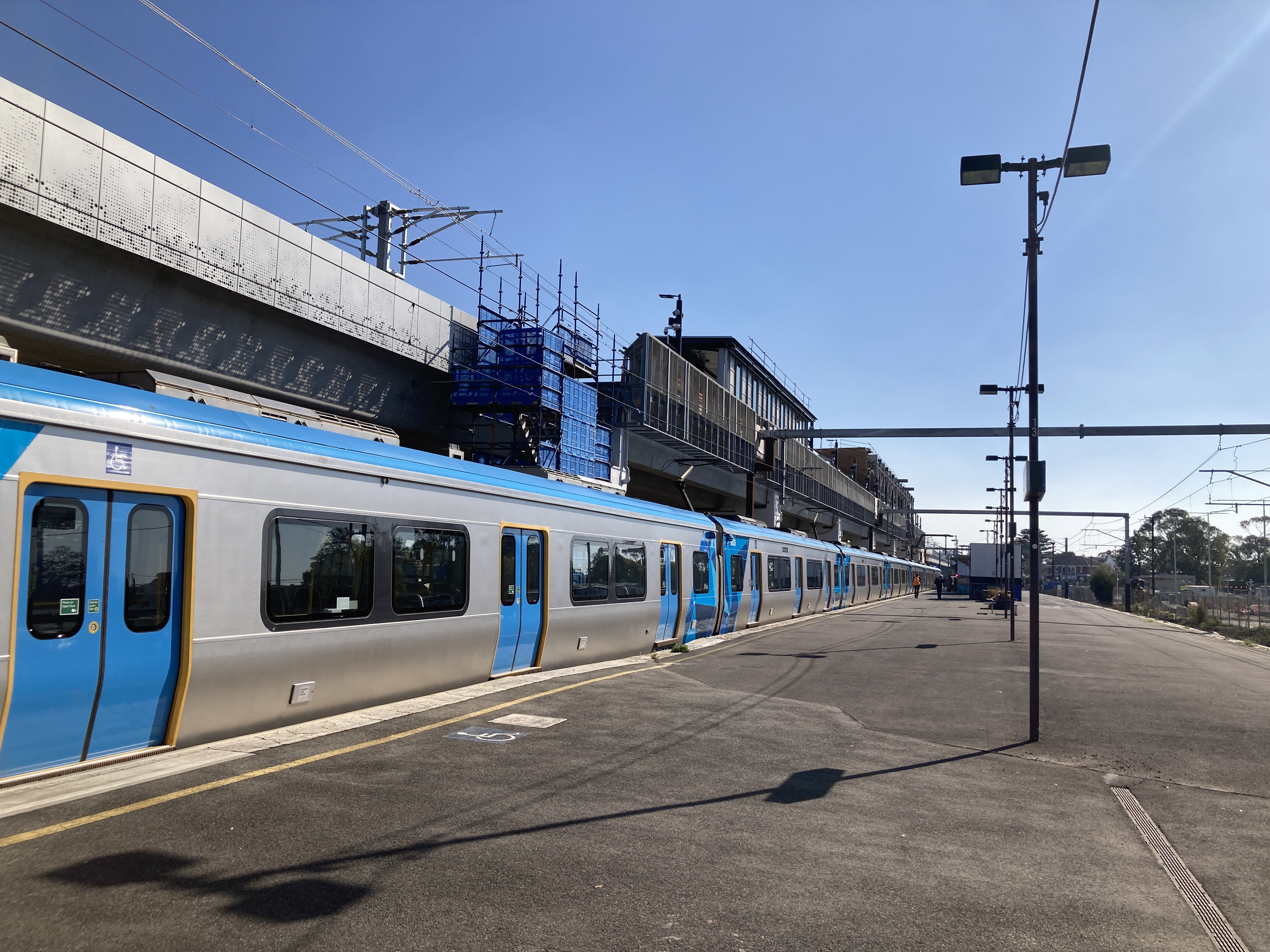
Westbound view from former ground level Platform 1, showing elevated station under construction, March 2024

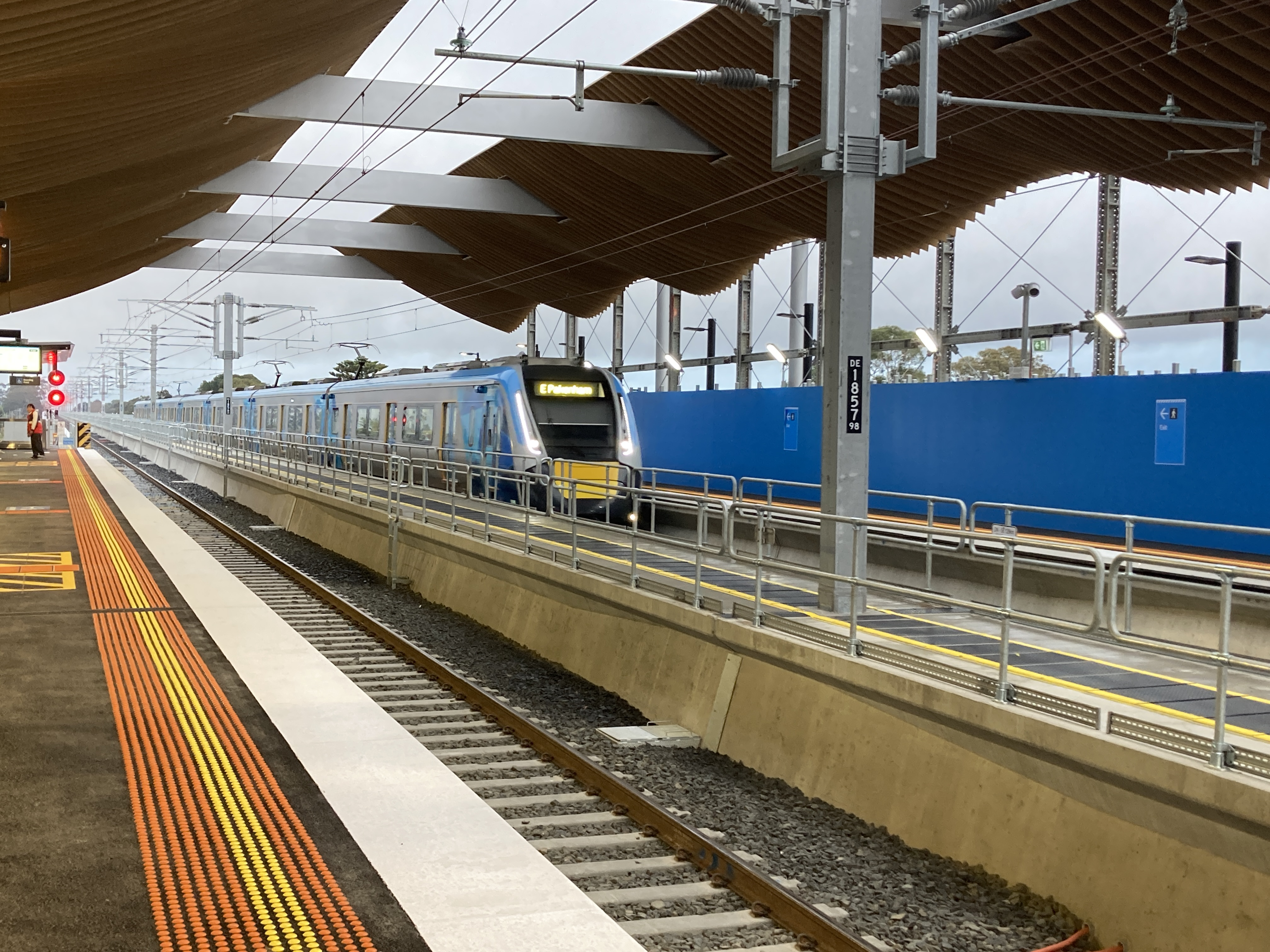
Westbound view from Platform 1 with a HCMT arriving at Platform 2 on an East Pakenham-bound service, June 2024

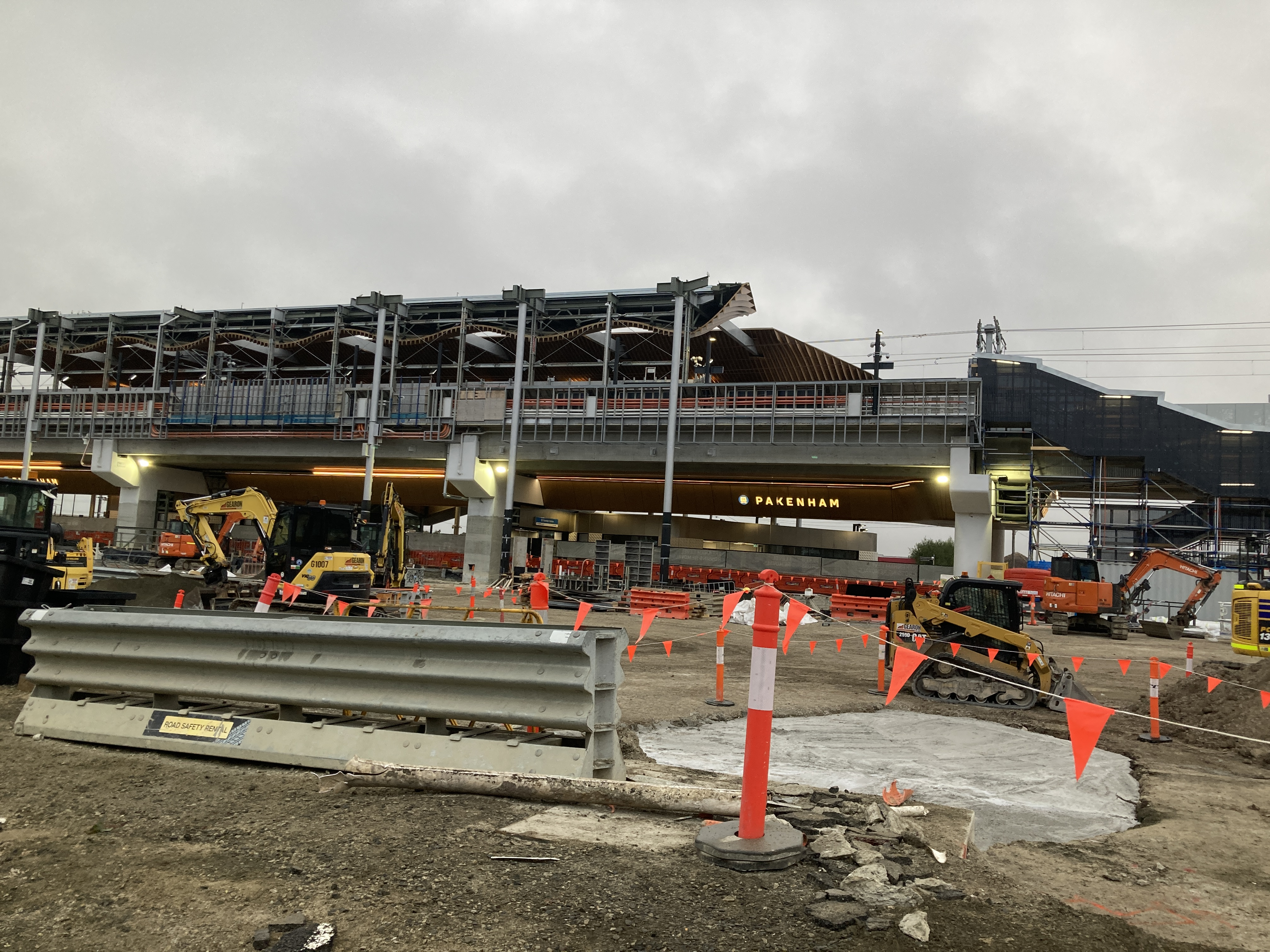
Southbound view of the newly rebuilt elevated station, showing the uncompleted north side,
June 2024
