= Casey Central =

Casey Central Shopping Centre
- Location: Narre Warren South, Victoria, Australia
- Coordinates: 38°4′3″S 145°18′2″E
- Stores: 91
- Anchor tenants: 4
- Floor area: 28,500 m^{2} (307,000 sq ft)
- Floors: 1
- Parking: 1,300+
- Website: www.caseycentral.com.au

Casey Central is a regional shopping centre located in the suburb of Narre Warren South, Victoria, approximately 41 kilometres (25 mi) south-east from the Melbourne central business district. The centre underwent a major redevelopment in 2016 and currently includes a Kmart Discount Department store, three supermarkets and over 90 specialty stores. The centre also features a fresh food hall and a number of casual dining options. The centre has a foot traffic count of approximately 300,000 people per month.

== History ==
Casey Central initially opened with a Coles supermarket, Post office and some specialty stores. The opening date is not currently verified.

=== Redevelopment ===
A redevelopment of Casey Central commenced in the mid-2010s, with the expanded centre opening on 17 March 2016. The redevelopment included a new Aldi supermarket, Target discount department store, a relocated Coles supermarket and a Woolworths supermarket in the former Coles space, which opened later in the year. In October 2020, the Target store was converted to a Kmart.

== Major stores ==
- Kmart
- Woolworths
- Coles
- Aldi
- Target (Formerly)
