= Warragul railway station =

Railway station in Victoria, Australia

Warragul
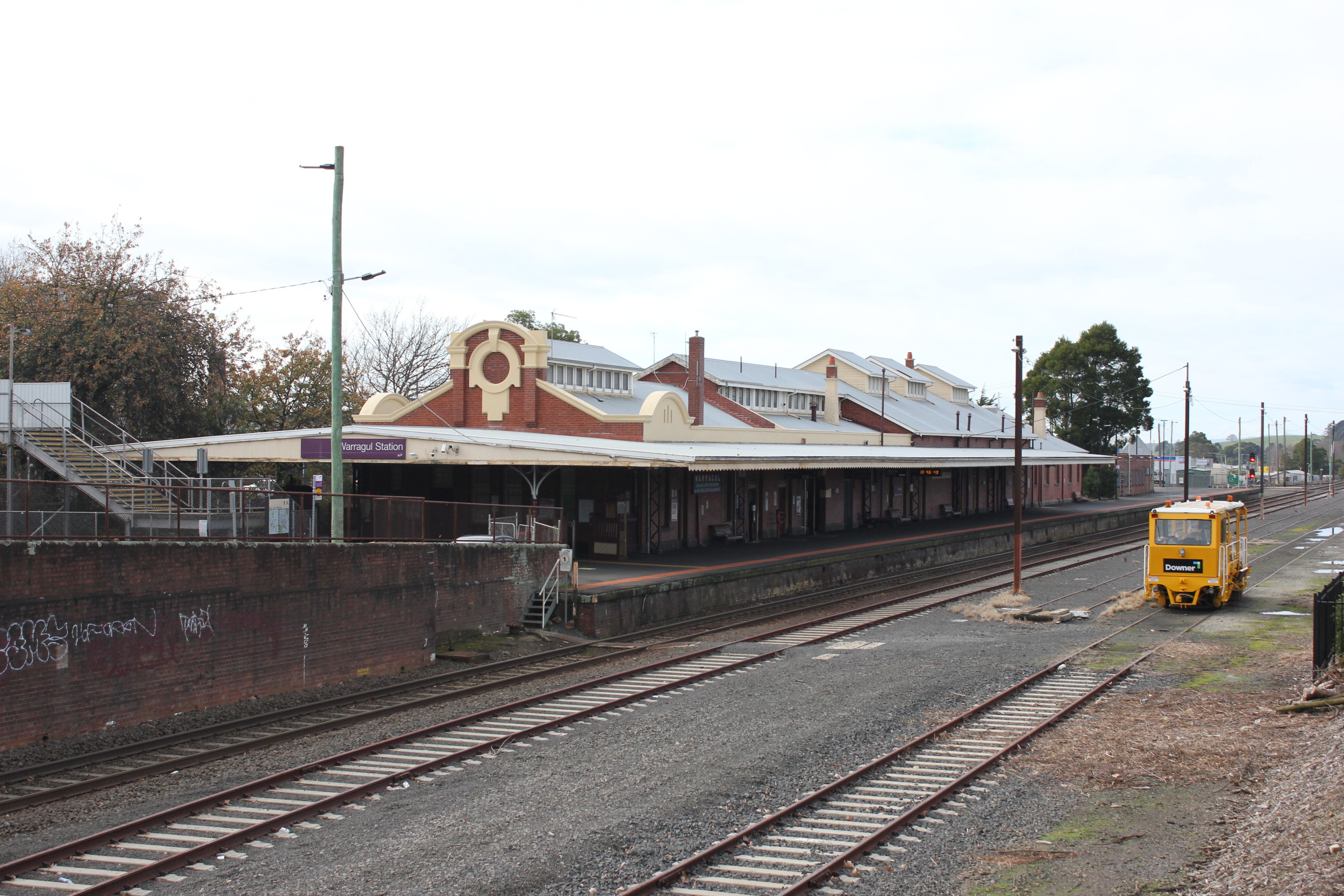
- Eastbound view of station platform and building, July 2018

General information
- Location: 122 Queen Street, Warragul, Victoria 3820; Shire of Baw Baw; Australia
- Coordinates: 38°09′53″S 145°55′56″E
- System: PTV regional rail station
- Owner: VicTrack
- Operator: V/Line
- Line: Gippsland
- Distance: 99.67 kilometres from Southern Cross
- Platforms: 2 (1 island)
- Tracks: 5
- Connections: Bus

Construction
- Structure type: At-grade
- Parking: 200 spaces
- Cycle facilities: Available
- Accessible: Yes

Other information
- Status: Operational, staffed
- Station code: WGL
- Fare zone: Myki zone 6/7
- Website: Public Transport Victoria

History
- Opened: 1 March 1878; 148 years ago
- Rebuilt: 2015
- Former names: Warrigal (1878-1879)

Services
Preceding station	V/Line	Following station
Drouin towards Southern Cross	Gippsland line	Yarragon towards Traralgon or Bairnsdale
Drouin towards Southern Cross	Gippsland line Bairnsdale express	Moe towards Bairnsdale

Victorian Heritage Register
- Official name: Warragul Railway Station
- Criteria: A, D
- Designated: 20 August 1982
- Reference no.: VHR H1598
Location
- Location within Victoria

Warragul railway station is a regional railway station on the Gippsland line, part of the Victorian railway network. It serves the town of Warragul, in Victoria, Australia. Warragul station is a ground level premium station, featuring one island platform. It opened on 1 March 1878, with the current station provided in 2015.

Initially opened as Warrigal, the station was given its current name of Warragul on 1 May 1879.

== History ==
The line between Pakenham and Warragul was duplicated in various stages between 1952 and 1956, and was electrified in 1954. Two years earlier, in 1952, the line to Yarragon was duplicated, and in 1955, electrification was extended to Moe.

It was the junction station for the branch line to Neerim South and Noojee, which closed in 1958.

Starting from 15 February 1987, and lasting until December 1998, the station was the terminus of a number of The Met/PTC electric passenger services from Flinders Street. The line was de-electrified beyond Warragul on 28 June 1987, and the overhead support structures were removed in 2005/2006, as part of the Regional Fast Rail project.

The former "A" siding was abolished in 1988, along with alterations to the points, signals and levers. Also during 1988, the double line block system between Warragul and Yarragon was abolished, with automatic three position signalling introduced. This introduction also resulted in the abolition of signal boxes "A" and "B", both replaced by a signal panel in the station building.

The tracks in the former yard are now used as storage for concrete sleepers, old and new signals, and rail machines. Tracks on the northern side of the station were moved slightly, to reduce the radius of curves, and allow trains to travel at higher speed.

On 28 April 2006, the signal panel within the station building was abolished.

The station itself was upgraded in 2015. It included a new car park and a bus interchange, a new footbridge next to the Alfred Street overpass and a new road underpass at Normanby Place, located at the eastern end of the station.

== Platforms and services ==
Warragul has one island platform with two faces. It is serviced by V/Line Traralgon and Bairnsdale line services.

Warragul platform arrangement
Platform	Line	Destination
1	Traralgon line Bairnsdale line	Southern Cross
2	Traralgon line Bairnsdale line	Traralgon, Bairnsdale

== Transport links ==
Warragul Bus Lines operates eight routes via Warragul station, under contract to Public Transport Victoria:

- 80 : to Warragul South
- 81 : to Warragul North
- 82 : to Warragul North
- 83 : to Warragul East
- 85 : to Drouin station
- 89 : to Noojee
- Garfield station – Traralgon Plaza
- Traralgon station – Drouin North

== Gallery ==
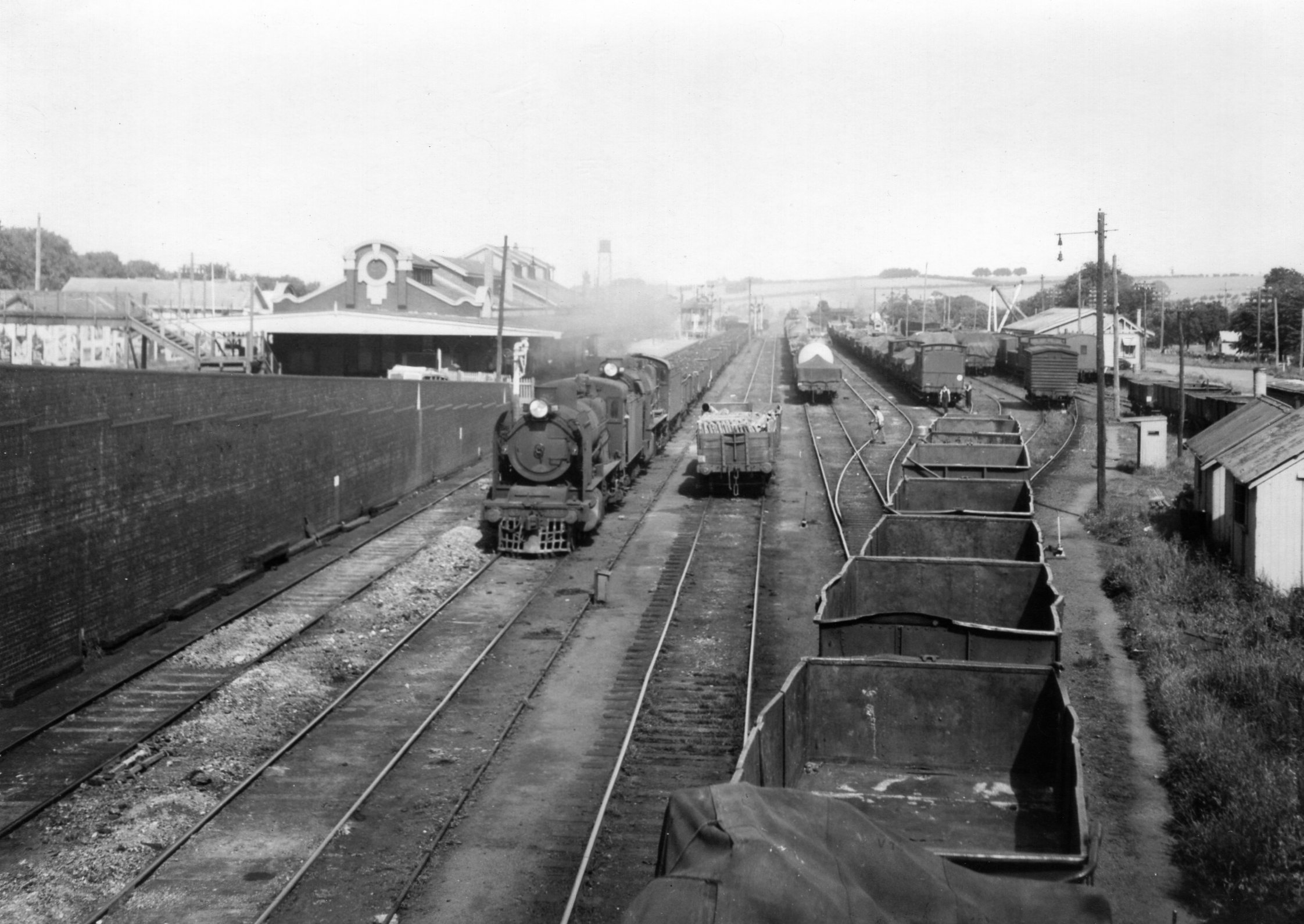
Eastbound view with a Flinders Street bound Steam locomotive, c. 1920
