= Garfield railway station =

Railway station in Victoria, Australia

Garfield
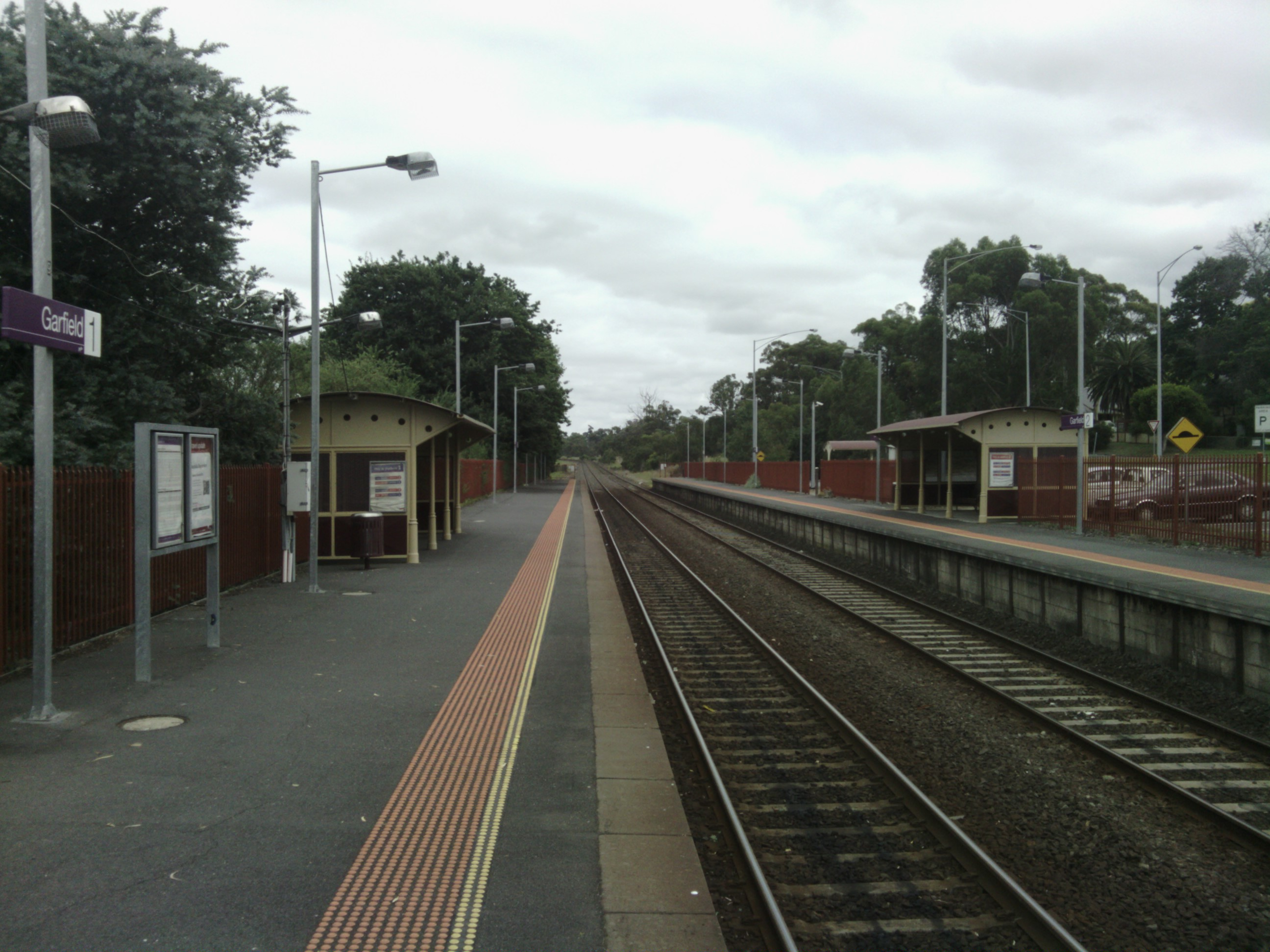
- Westbound view from Platform 1, January 2015

General information
- Location: Nar Nar Goon–Longwarry Road, Garfield, Victoria 3814; Shire of Cardinia; Australia
- Coordinates: 38°05′28″S 145°40′25″E
- System: PTV regional rail station
- Owner: VicTrack
- Operator: V/Line
- Line: Gippsland
- Distance: 74.94 kilometres from Southern Cross
- Platforms: 2 side
- Tracks: 2
- Connections: Bus

Construction
- Structure type: At-grade
- Parking: Yes
- Accessible: Yes

Other information
- Status: Operational, unstaffed
- Station code: GFD
- Fare zone: Myki zone 4/5
- Website: Public Transport Victoria

History
- Opened: 17 December 1884; 141 years ago
- Former names: Cannibal Creek Siding (1884–1887)

Services
Preceding station	V/Line	Following station
Tynong towards Southern Cross	Gippsland line	Bunyip towards Traralgon or Bairnsdale
Pakenham towards Southern Cross	Gippsland line Bairnsdale express	Drouin towards Bairnsdale
Location
- Location within Victoria

Garfield railway station is a regional railway station on the Gippsland line, part of the Victorian railway network. It serves the town of Garfield, in Victoria, Australia. Garfield station is a ground level unstaffed station, featuring two side platforms. It opened on 17 December 1884.

Initially opened as Cannibal Creek Siding, the station was given its current name of Garfield on 28 March 1887, after other suggested names from locals were rejected.

== History ==
The station was destroyed by fire on 20 February 1924. In 1954, electrification of the line was provided between Pakenham and Warragul, and in 1956, the line between Tynong and Bunyip was duplicated, with a new down platform (Platform 2) provided.

In 1971, a crossover at the station was abolished, and in 1978, the up end connection to the siding was abolished. The siding was abolished altogether in 1987.

In 1998, electrified services between Pakenham and Warragul ceased, with de-electrification between those stations occurring in 2001.

== Platforms and services ==
Garfield has two side platforms. It is serviced by V/Line Traralgon and Bairnsdale line services.

Garfield platform arrangement
Platform	Line	Destination
1	Traralgon line Bairnsdale line	Southern Cross
2	Traralgon line Bairnsdale line	Traralgon, Bairnsdale

== Transport links ==
Warragul Bus Lines operates three routes to and from Garfield station, under contract to Public Transport Victoria:

- to Nar Nar Goon station
- to Pakenham station
- to Traralgon Plaza
