= Gippsland line =

Passenger rail service in Victoria, Australia

Bairnsdale

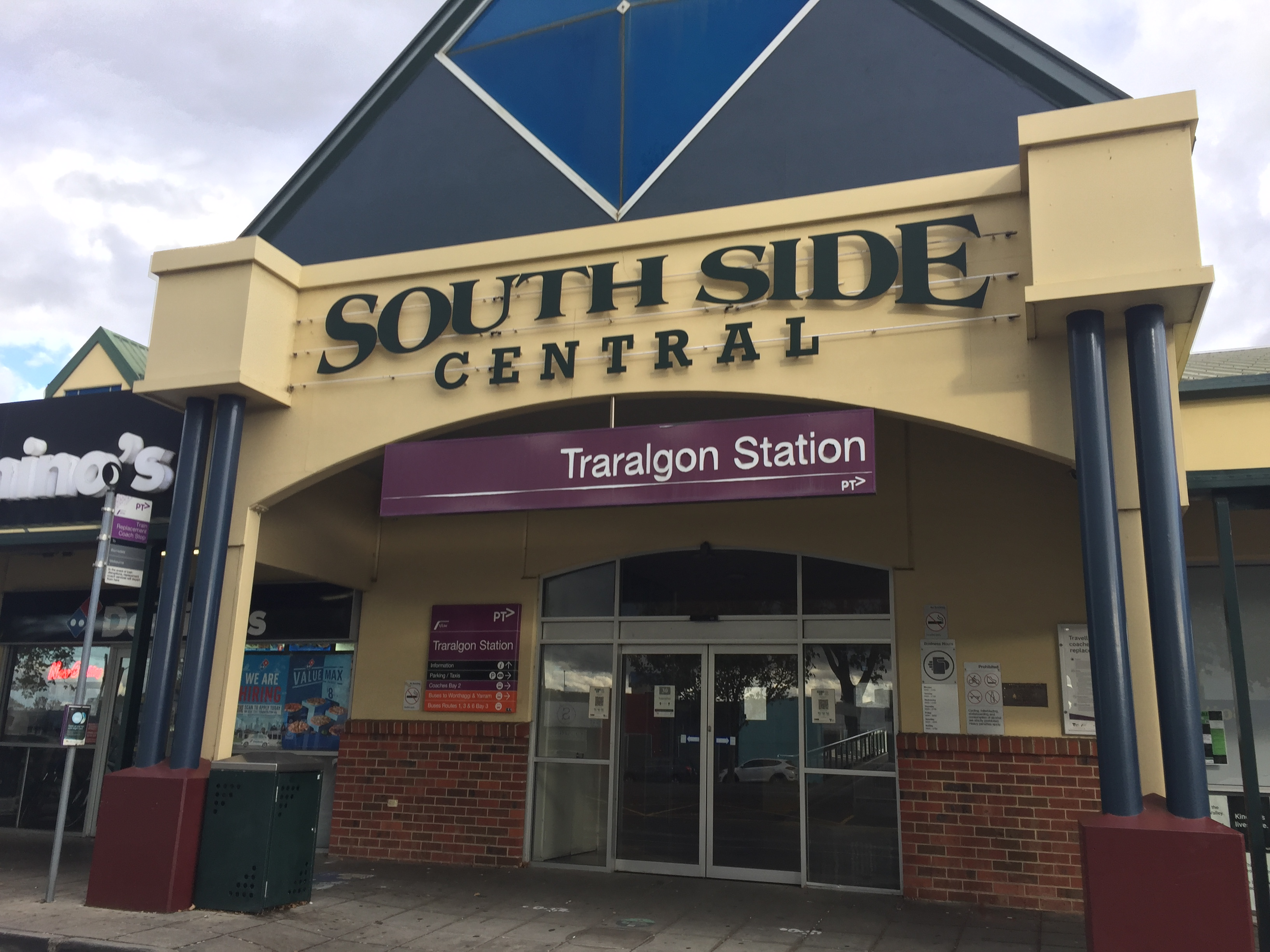
- Traralgon railway station entrance

Overview
- Service type: Regional rail
- Status: Operational
- Locale: Victoria, Australia
- Current operator: V/Line

Route
- Termini: Southern Cross; Traralgon; Bairnsdale
- Stops: 23
- Distance travelled: 276.80 km (172.00 mi)
- Line used: Gippsland

On-board services
- Class: Economy
- Catering facilities: None

Technical
- Rolling stock: VLocity
- Track gauge: 1,600 mm (5 ft 3 in)
- Electrification: None
- Track owner: VicTrack

The Bairnsdale line is a regional passenger rail service operated by V/Line in Victoria, Australia. It serves 23 stations towards its terminus in the regional city of Bairnsdale, but most services terminate at Traralgon.

== History ==
Although the line was extended to Orbost in 1916, passenger services along the line extended only as far as Bairnsdale beginning in the 1930s. In 1954 the line beyond Dandenong was electrified as far as Traralgon, with services from this time provided by the L class electric locomotives.

In 1975 suburban services were extended from Dandenong to Pakenham, on what is known as the Pakenham line. By the 1980s, the motive power of trains reverted to diesel locomotives, with electrification cut back to Warragul in 1987, and to Bunyip in 1998. Suburban Comeng trains were used by V/Line to provide services from Melbourne to Warragul in the late 1980s and early 1990s.

In 1993, passenger services from Sale to Bairnsdale were withdrawn, leading to massive protests. They were reinstated in 2004 as part of the Linking Victoria program. The line was upgraded as part of the Regional Fast Rail project in 2005 and the last of the overhead wires were removed, except for a short section to the Melbourne side of Bunyip station.

In March 2013 the service was suspended east of Traralgon because of safety problems with level crossings. Rail services resumed in October 2013.

== Services ==
Services to Traralgon operate every 40 minutes every day. Between Southern Cross and Pakenham, services generally stop at Flinders Street, Richmond, Caulfield, Clayton and Dandenong. One service during the weekday peak(running towards Melbourne in the morning peak, and Traralgon in the afternoon peak), also stops at Berwick. At metropolitan stations (excluding Pakenham), trains running towards Traralgon and Bairnsdale only pick up passengers, and trains running towards Southern Cross only set down passengers.

Most services stop at all stations between Pakenham and their terminus, but a few services during peak periods run express from Pakenham to Garfield, Garfield to Drouin, and Warragul to Moe. A few peak service terminate and originat at Flinders Street instead of Southern Cross.

There are three daily return services to Bairnsdale. At Bairnsdale, trains connect with road coach services to Orbost, Batemans Bay and Canberra. All Bairnsdale services as of September 2024 are operated by V/Line VLocity diesel multiple-unit trains, with the last N class locomotive-hauled service operating on 14 September 2024.

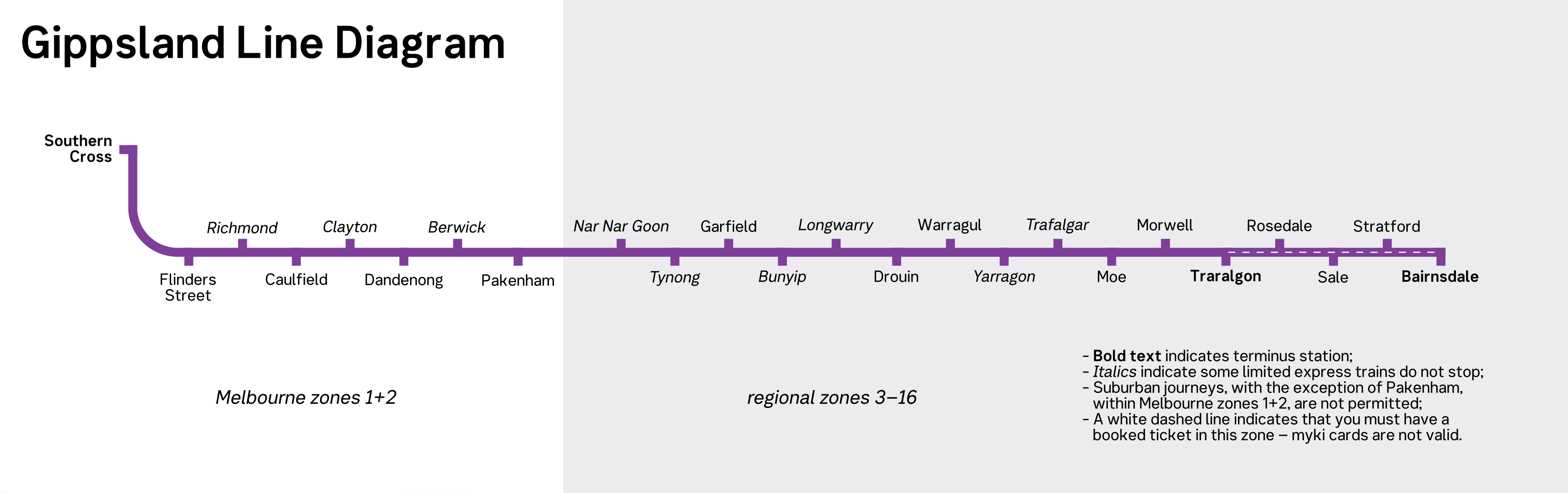
Bairnsdale Line route diagram

== Gallery ==
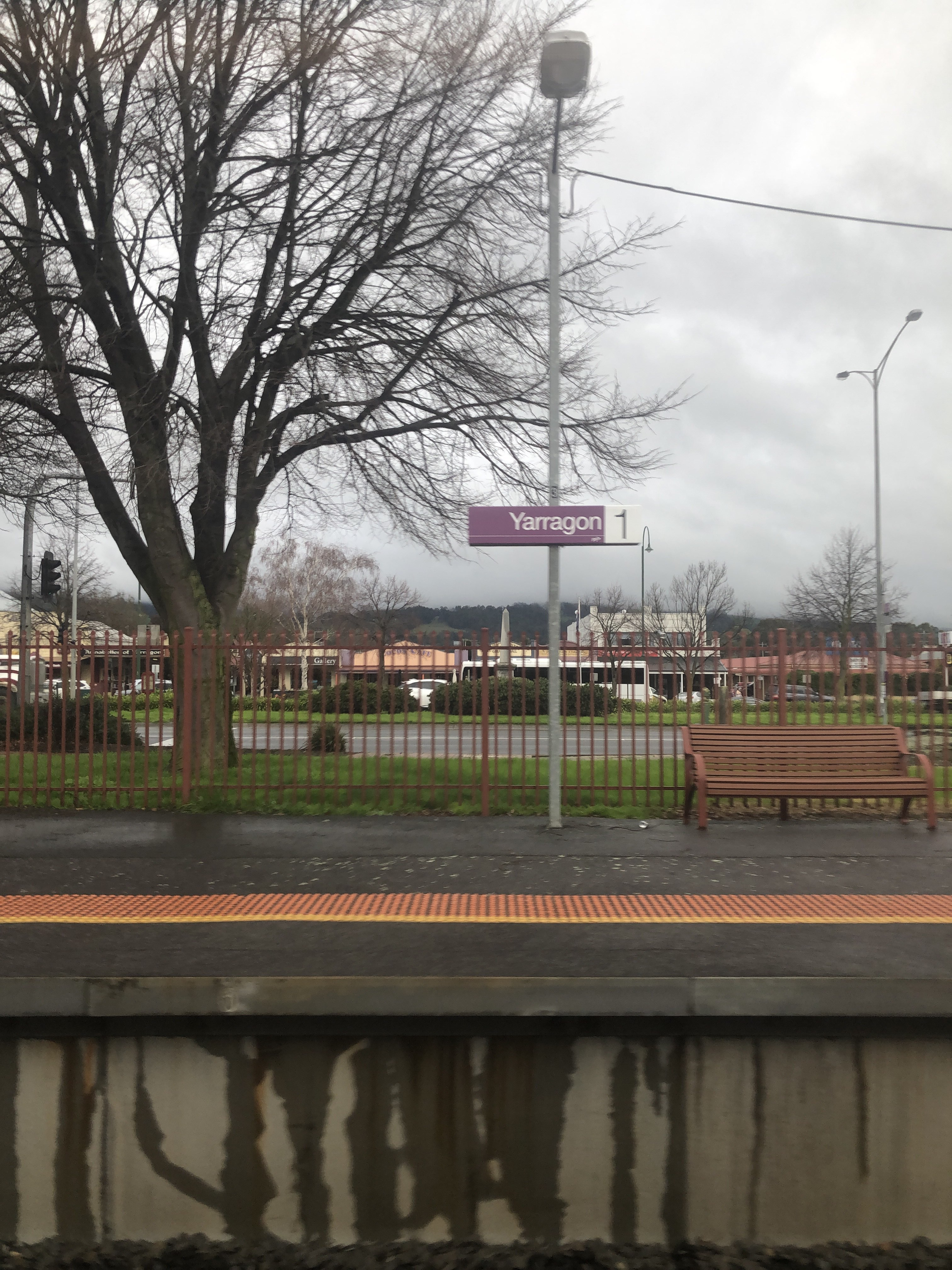
Platform sign at Yarragon

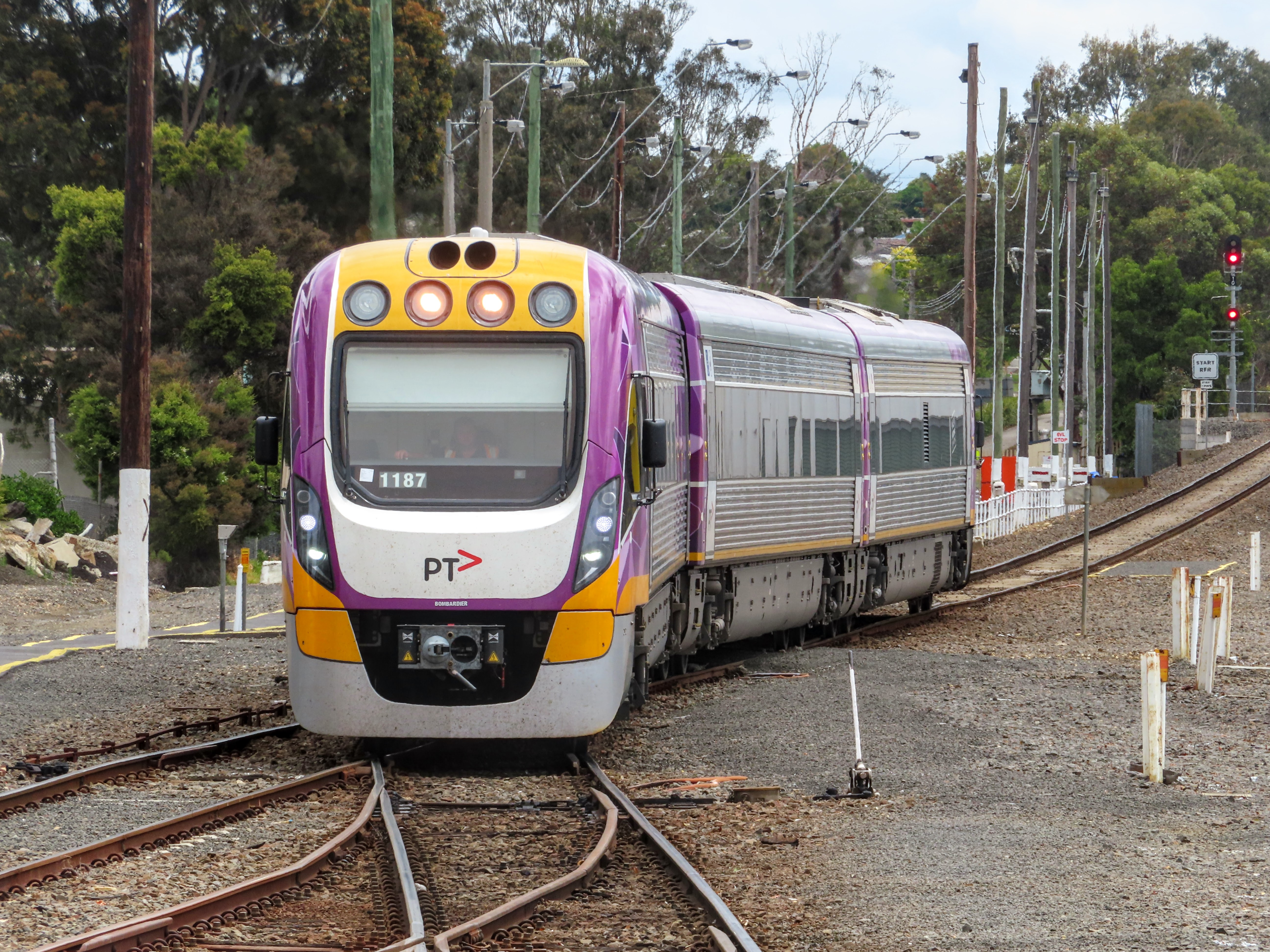
A V/Line VLocity arriving at Traralgon

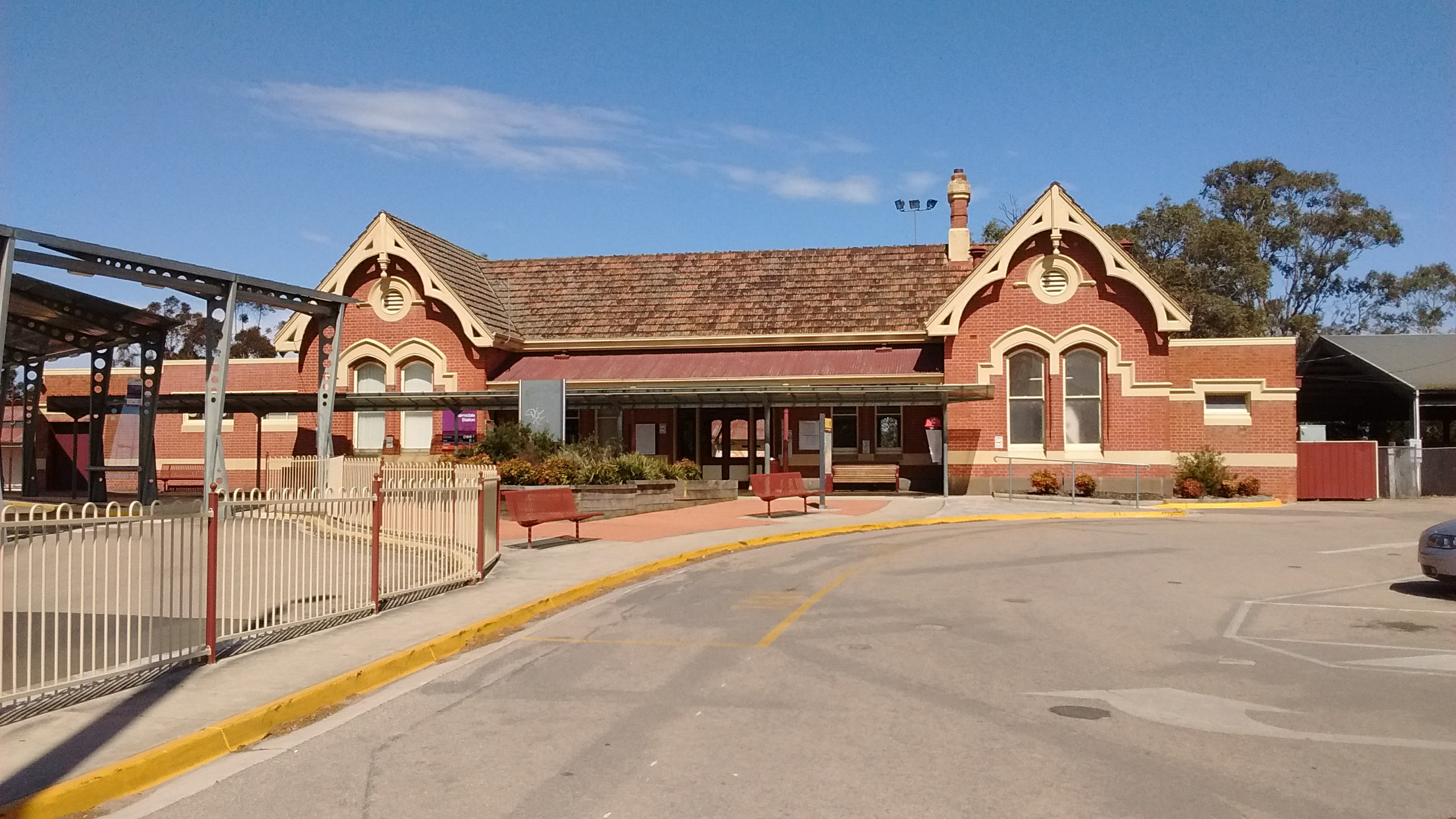
Bairnsdale railway station, the current terminus of the line

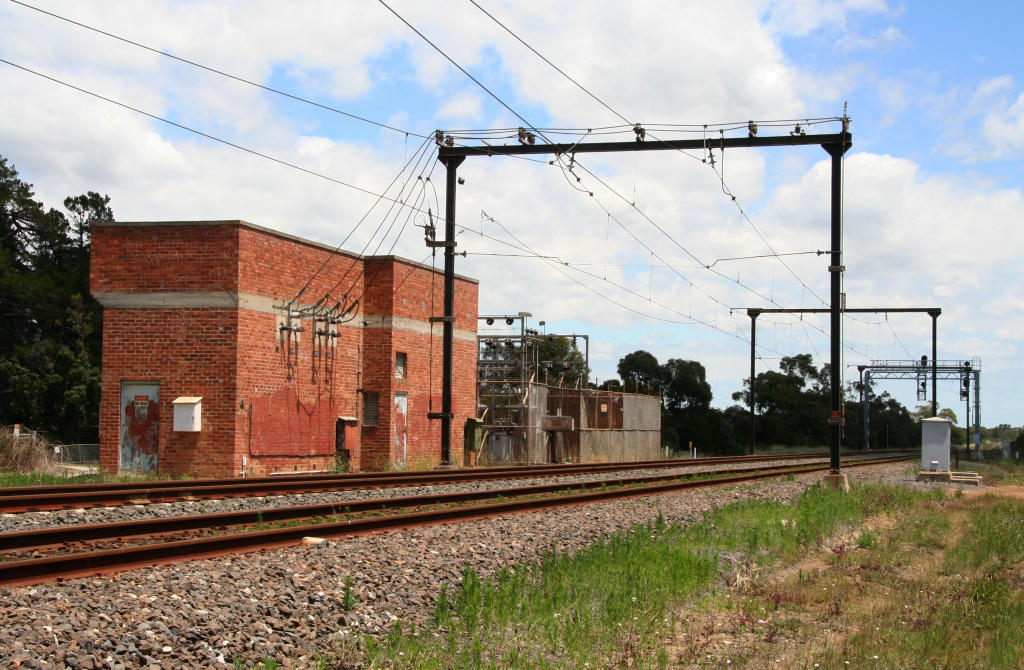
Heritage-listed overhead wiring and electrical substation at Bunyip, a remnant of when the line was electrified as far as Traralgon
