= Traralgon Centre Plaza =

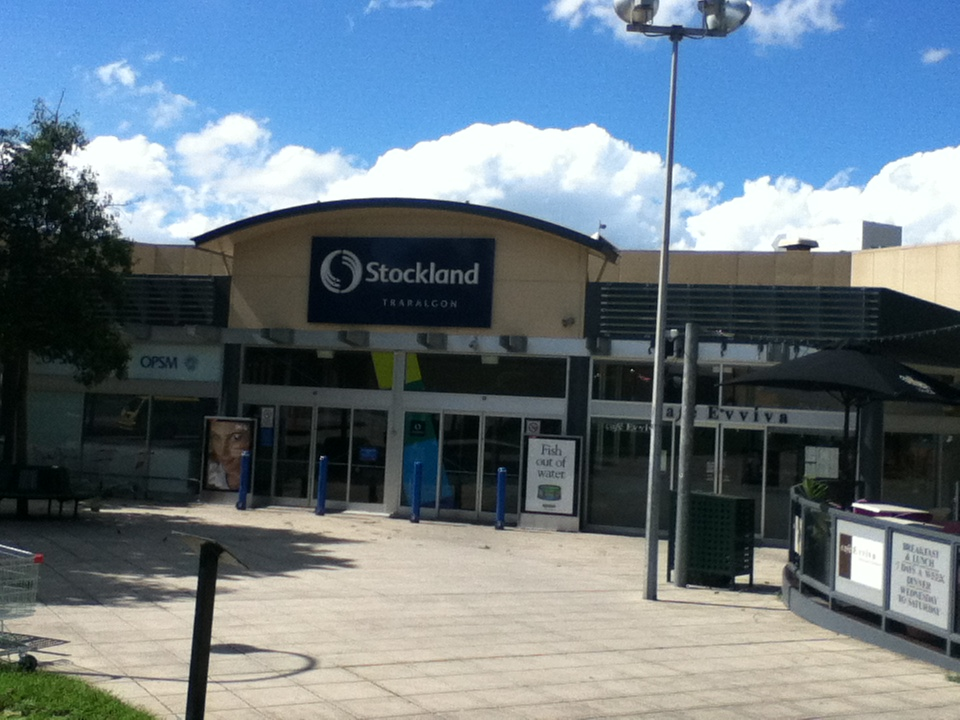
- The south-west entrance on the corner of Franklin Street and Post Office Place, taken in 2012 before the 2018 minor extension.
- Location: Traralgon, Victoria, Australia
- Coordinates: 38°11′39″S 146°32′23″E
- Opened: 11 November 1985
- Previous names: Stockland Traralgon (2003–2021)
- Developer: Grollo Group
- Manager: CBRE Group
- Owner: Fawkner Property
- Num. of stores: 56
- Num. of anchor tenants: 2
- Floor area: 20,087 m^{2}
- Floors: 1
- Parking: 756 spaces
- Website: www.traralgoncentreplaza.com.au

Traralgon Centre Plaza (formerly Stockland Traralgon) is a single-level enclosed sub-regional shopping centre located in the central business district of Traralgon, Victoria, Australia. It serves as a retail hub for the Latrobe Valley and wider Gippsland region, featuring over 50 specialty stores alongside its major anchors.

== History ==
=== Early planning and development ===
Initial planning for the Traralgon Centre Plaza began in the early 1980s, spearheaded by co-developers Jim Coombe and John Minuzzo of Minfam Pty Ltd, who proposed the project through Country Shopping Centres. The initial $20 million proposal for the 4.45-hectare site adjoining Franklin and Argyle Streets outlined an 18,000-square metre complex originally intended to be anchored by a Woolworths supermarket and a Big W discount department store. The original masterplan also included a junior department store, a major electrical retailer, roughly 30 specialty shops, and parking for 1,100 vehicles.

The local city council initially approved a second stage to the project, valued at $5 million, which would have added an eight-storey office complex on top of the western end of the plaza, providing 5,264 square metres of rentable space and a further 105 car parks. However, rival developers Grollo-Lustig—who were concurrently planning a $50 million Morwell Civic Centre complex—temporarily issued a stop writ against the project, claiming the plaza's planning approval had not been properly advertised.

Ultimately, the project proceeded but pivoted away from the Woolworths anchors and the high-rise office tower concept. The revised design was constructed by Melbourne-based Grollo Constructions, designed by architect Mario Bernardi, and leased by Max McMahon of LJ Hooker.

=== Opening and retail evolution ===
The Traralgon Centre Plaza officially opened at 8:00 am on Monday, 11 November 1985. The project generated 250 jobs during its construction phase and approximately 450 retail jobs upon its completion.

Upon opening, the centre was anchored by a Super Kmart hypermarket, an early retail format combining a discount department store and a supermarket under one roof. It also housed a 929-square-metre Fossey's store alongside 34 specialty shops. In mid-1989, the Super Kmart concept was discontinued in Australia, resulting in the hypermarket floor space being structurally separated to form individual Coles and Kmart stores.

Around the same time, in June 1989, the shopping centre was sold to Barnett Corporation for $13.5 million. The centre changed ownership again in 1992 when it was sold to a fund managed by Schroders. By June 1994, the tenant mix had evolved to include a Franklins No Frills supermarket operating alongside Coles, Kmart, and Fossey's.

=== Stockland ownership ===
In June 2003, the complex was acquired by property group Stockland and rebranded as Stockland Traralgon. During its 18-year tenure, Stockland conducted various upgrades to modernise the centre. A $4.8 million minor extension and upgrade commenced in June 2018. This project added a 574-square-metre extension to the south-west corner of the centre (fronting the corner of Franklin Street and Post Office Place), creating new retail spaces. The upgrade also modernised the Franklin Street entrance with architectural cladding and landscaping, alongside targeted accessibility and sustainability improvements. The renovations were completed by November 2018.

=== Fawkner Property and recent history ===
In March 2021, Stockland sold the shopping centre to Melbourne-based fund manager Fawkner Property for $85 million. Following the acquisition, the new owners reverted the facility's name back to Traralgon Centre Plaza.

== Facilities and design ==
Traralgon Centre Plaza has a gross leasable area (GLA) of approximately 20,087 square metres. The mall's interior architecture is designed around a dual rectangular "racetrack" layout to optimise pedestrian flow. Historically, the internal decor was distinguished by its angled ceilings with recessed lighting and reddish terrazzo flooring, which still exist today. A structural feature of the centre since its inception is a basement-to-ground-level travelator, which was a first in the Latrobe Valley.

To accommodate visitors from the wider Gippsland area, the complex includes parking for 756 vehicles, a portion of which is located in an underground basement carpark. The basement carpark is flood-prone during heavy rain and storms, with several flooding events requiring property repairs. On 10 June 2021, torrential rain caused water levels to rise at least 400 millimetres in the basement in a matter of hours. The floodwaters caused extensive damage to the travelator, fire pump room, electrical switchboards, and retailers' storerooms, necessitating a significant clean-up effort.

The property and leasing is managed by CBRE on behalf of the owners Fawkner Property.

== Tenants ==
The main shopping centre currently houses around 56 stores and services, incorporating a food court, an external bus interchange, and national retail brands. In recent years, both Coles and Kmart have undergone store refurbishments to modernise their layouts and entrances.

The eastern at-grade car park contains pad sites accommodating a McDonald's restaurant, which was originally proposed as part of the plaza's 1980s masterplan, as well a mycar Tyre & Auto (formerly Kmart Tyre & Auto Service) centre.

=== Major tenants ===
- Coles
- Kmart

=== Prominent retailers ===
- Cotton On
- Liquorland
- McDonald's
- mycar Tyre & Auto
- Priceline Pharmacy
- The Reject Shop
