= Traralgon railway station =

Railway station in Victoria, Australia

Traralgon
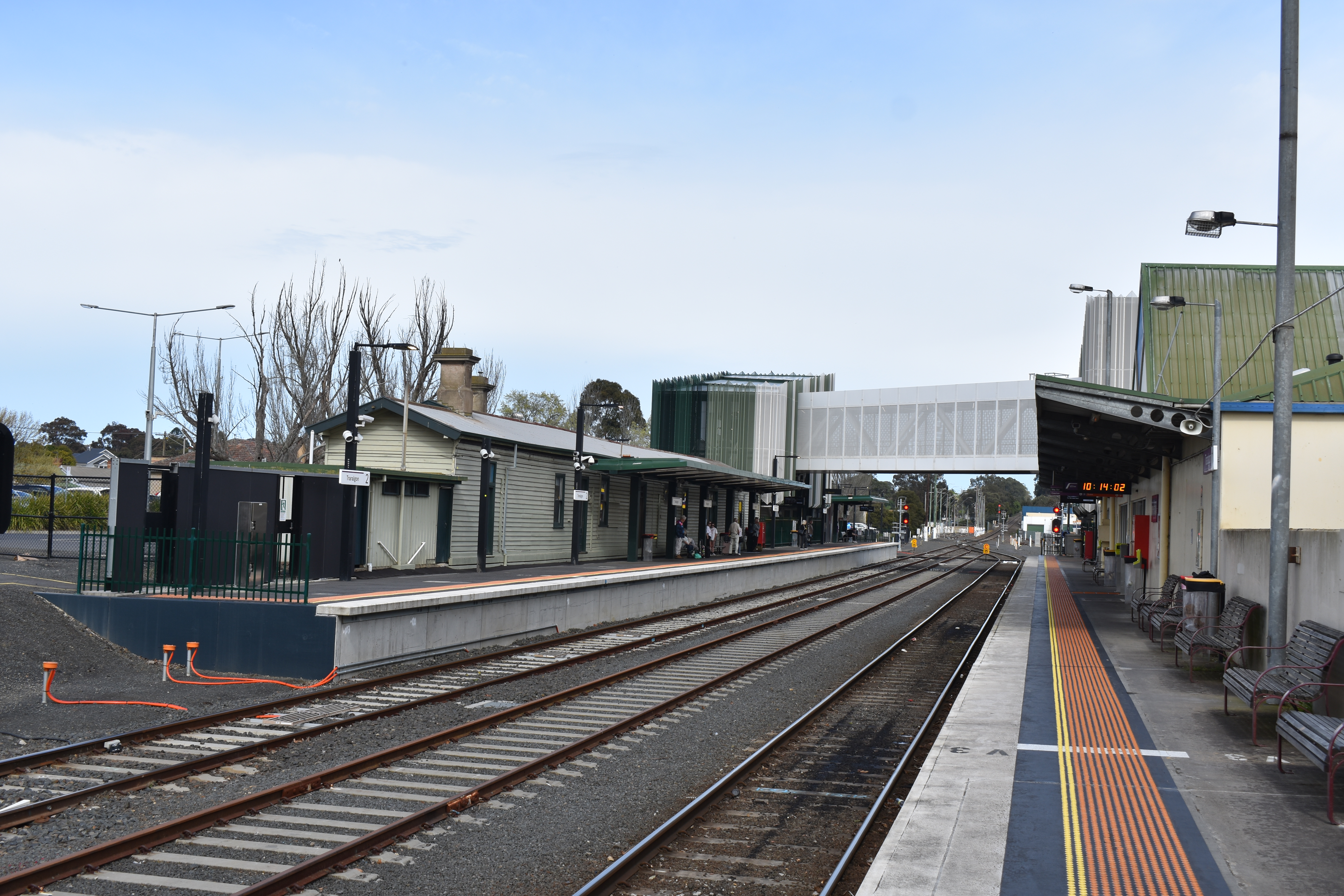
- South-east bound view from Platform 1, October 2025

General information
- Location: Princes Highway, Traralgon, Victoria 3844; City of Latrobe; Australia
- Coordinates: 38°11′56″S 146°32′19″E
- System: PTV regional rail station
- Owner: VicTrack
- Operator: V/Line
- Line: Gippsland line
- Distance: 158.07 kilometres from Southern Cross
- Platforms: 2 (One not in use)
- Tracks: 3
- Connections: Bus

Construction
- Structure type: At-grade
- Parking: Yes
- Cycle facilities: Yes
- Accessible: Yes

Other information
- Status: Operational, staffed
- Station code: TRG
- Fare zone: Myki zone 12
- Website: Public Transport Victoria

History
- Opened: 1 June 1877; 149 years ago
- Rebuilt: 16 June 1995

Services
Preceding station	V/Line	Following station
Morwell towards Southern Cross	Gippsland line	Rosedale towards Bairnsdale
Morwell towards Southern Cross	Gippsland line	Terminus

Former service
Preceding station	Disused railways	Following station
Maryvale siding	Orbost line	Loy Yang
Terminus	Maffra line	Glengarry
List of closed railway stations in Victoria
Location
- Location within Victoria

Traralgon railway station is a regional railway station on the Gippsland line, part of the Victorian railway network. It serves the city of Traralgon, in Victoria, Australia. It opened on 1 June 1877, with the current station provided in 1995.

The station is the terminus for V/Line's Traralgon line services. It was formerly the junction of the cross country branch line to Maffra and Stratford, which was closed between 1987–1995.

== History ==
Electrification of the Gippsland line to Traralgon was carried out between 1954 and 1956, to support freight traffic in the Latrobe Valley. After that traffic declined, the rail line to Traralgon station was de-electrified on 2 July 1987.

In 1990, the signal box and auxiliary frame at the station were abolished, as well as the up end connections to the former locomotive depot sidings, and the former dock platform for the Maffra line.

On 16 June 1995, the current station building and platform opened, as part of a commercial development on the site. The station was sited on the opposite side of the line to the former station. The former station building still exists, under private ownership. The turntable and engine shed have been retained, with the latter listed on the Victorian Heritage Register. Traralgon is now only used for passenger services, with freight operations ceasing in 1994.

In early 2019, Rail Projects Victoria announced a second platform would be built at the station. The project would also involve upgrading the existing pedestrian overpass.

== Platforms and services ==
Traralgon has one side platform, with a second side platform under construction. It is served by V/Line Traralgon line trains, which terminate at the station, and Bairnsdale line trains.

Traralgon platform arrangement
Platform	Line	Destination
1	Traralgon line Bairnsdale line	Southern Cross, Bairnsdale
2	Traralgon line Bairnsdale line	Southern Cross

== Transport links ==
Latrobe Valley Bus Lines operates four routes via Traralgon station, under contract to Public Transport Victoria:

- 1 : Moe – Traralgon
- 3 : Traralgon – Churchill
- 6 : Traralgon – Traralgon South
- 7 : Traralgon – Churchill

South Coast Bus operates one route to and from Traralgon station, under contract to Public Transport Victoria:

- to Wonthaggi

Turnbulls operates one route via Traralgon station, under contract to Public Transport Victoria:

- Yarram – Traralgon

Warragul Bus Lines operates two routes via Traralgon station, under contract to Public Transport Victoria:

- Garfield station – Traralgon Plaza
- to Drouin North
