= Andrews government =

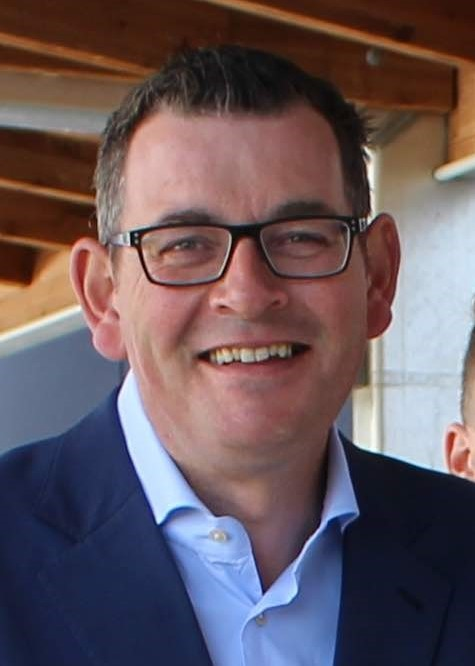
- Premiership of Daniel Andrews; 4 December 2014 – 27 September 2023
- Premier: Daniel Andrews
- Governor: Alex Chernov; Linda Dessau; Margaret Gardner
- Cabinet: Andrews I Andrews II; Andrews III
- Party: Victorian Labor
- Election: 2014 · 2018 · 2022
- Appointed by: Governor Alex Chernov
- Seat: 1 Treasury Place
- Coat of arms of Victoria

The Andrews government was the state executive government of Victoria, Australia, led by Premier Daniel Andrews of the Labor Party. It began on 4 December 2014 when Andrews took over as premier following the 2014 Victorian state election and concluded with Andrews's resignation, leading to the 2023 Victorian Labor Party leadership election which resulted in Deputy Premier of Victoria Jacinta Allan winning the election uncontested and subsequently forming government on 27 September 2023.

== Term of government (2014–2023) ==
=== Economic policy ===
==== Privatisation ====
In 2018, the Andrews government oversaw the privatisation of the land titles and registry office for $2.8 billion.

In 2022, the Andrews government oversaw the privatisation of the operation of the registration and licensing part of VicRoads.

===== Port of Melbourne lease =====
In September 2016, the Andrews Government privatised the Port of Melbourne for a term of 50 years in return for more than $9.7 billion.

=== Infrastructure ===
On winning office, Andrews government cancelled the East West Link project and initiated the Level Crossing Removal Project and the Melbourne Metro Rail Project.

In August 2018, Andrews announced plans to build the Suburban Rail Loop, connecting all major rail lines via Melbourne Airport.

=== Social Policy ===
==== Abortion ====
In November 2015, the government passed a law to limit protests outside abortion clinics. The Liberal/Coalition mps had a conscience vote. and 150 metre buffer zones are now enforced.

==== Euthanasia ====
On 20 September 2017, the Voluntary Assisted Dying Bill 2017 was introduced into the Legislative Assembly of the Victorian Parliament by the Andrews Labor Government. The bill is modelled on the recommendations of an expert panel chaired by former Australian Medical Association president Professor Brian Owler. The proposed legislation was said by proponents to be the most conservative in the world and contain 68 safeguards including measures designed to protect vulnerable people from coercion and abuse, as well as a board to review each case. Labor and Coalition MPs were allowed a conscience vote on the Bill.

The bill was debated in the lower house over three sitting days, passing the Assembly without amendment on 20 October 2017 after an emotional and tense debate which lasted more than 24 hours. The bill was passed by 47 votes to 37. The Bill finally passed through parliament, with amendments made in the Victorian Legislative Council, on 29 November 2017.

In passing the bill, Victoria became the first state to legislate for voluntary assisted dying. The law received royal assent on 5 December 2017, and came into effect on 19 June 2019.

==== Drug policy ====
In 2017, The Andrews government approved a drug injection site in North Richmond, Victoria. the injecting room would be the first in Victoria.

In 2023, Andrews made it permanent.

==== Aboriginals ====
During his time as Premier of Victoria, Daniel Andrews led two major decisions to permanently fly the Aboriginal flag at prominent Victorian landmarks. In September 2015, the Aboriginal flag began flying permanently over Victoria's Parliament House alongside the Australian and Victorian state flags. Previously, it had only been flown temporarily for events such as NAIDOC Week and Reconciliation Week.

In 2022, the Victorian Government announced plans for the Aboriginal flag to permanently fly atop Melbourne's West Gate Bridge alongside the Australian flag. The Victorian Liberal Opposition Leader Matthew Guy supported the plans.

In 2018, the Parliament of Victoria passed the Advancing the Treaty Process with Aboriginal Victorians Bill 2018 which formally legislated a treaty-making body.

In 2019, the Aboriginal representative body was established and became the First Peoples' Assembly of Victoria. The state government established a truth-telling forum known as the Yoorrook Justice Commission in 2021.

The Victorian Liberal Party declared their support for the government's process of negotiating a treaty in 2022, but Liberal Party member Tim Smith indicated that he would vote against any proposed legislation on this matter. The Treaty Authority and Other Treaty Elements Bill 2022 passed parliament in August. The bill established the Treaty Authority which aimed to expand consultation with Indigenous peoples and act as an umpire for these negotiations.

The Legislative Council voted 31 votes to three for the Treaty Authority and Other Treaty Elements Bill 2022. The three who voted against the bill were the two Liberal Democrats Tim Quilty and David Limbrick, and former Liberal turned Democratic Labour Bernie Finn.

==== LGBT ====
In April 2015, the Andrews Government announced it would repeal Section 19A of the Crimes Act, a law which singled out intentional HIV transmission for harsher penalties of up to 25 years imprisonment, in contrast to the maximum penalty for manslaughter which was 20 years. As a result of the reform, intentional infection of HIV is now considered under existing criminal offences such as "causing serious injury". The Crimes Amendment (Repeal of Section 19A) Act 2015 passed the Parliament on 28 May 2015 and received royal assent on 2 June 2015, before immediately going into effect.

After returning to office at the November 2018 election, the government re-introduced legislation abolishing the sexual reassignment surgery requirement. The legislation allows applicants to self-nominate the sex listed on their birth registration as male, female, or any other gender diverse or non-binary descriptor of their choice. Children are also able to apply to alter the sex on their certificate, but only with the backing of their parents and a supporting statement from a doctor, psychologist or another prescribed person.

The legislation was introduced to the Parliament on 18 June and passed the Assembly by 56 votes to 27 on 15 August 2019. The bill moved to the Legislative Council, where it passed by 26 votes to 14 on 27 August 2019. The legislation received royal assent on 3 September 2019 and went into effect on 1 May 2020. The bill was debated along partisan lines in the Parliament. The Labor Party, the Greens and some crossbenchers were supportive, though Liberal/National members voted against the legislation, citing alleged concerns regarding the safety of women in single-sex spaces and the potential for applicants to abuse the system.

the Andrews government banned gay conversion in 2021. The Liberal opposition did not oppose the bill but moved a number of amendments that failed. The new laws hand down hefty fines or jail time of up to a decade for anyone caught trying to suppress or change someone’s sexuality.

In April 2022, a bill passed both houses of the Parliament and the Governor of Victoria granted royal assent became an Act – that repeals all HIV legislation within Victoria on mandatory public health disease notifications, blood donations and also human tissue services. The law goes into effect from 15 February 2023, or by proclamation sooner.

=== Crime ===
In April 2023, the Victorian Government committed to raising the age of criminal responsibility from 10 to 12 by the end of 2024 and to 14 by 2027.

=== Environmental policy ===
As of September 2016, Victoria has permanently banned hydraulic fracturing and all forms of unconventional gas extraction.

In 2021, Victoria under the Andrews goverment put a fracking ban in the Victorian Constitution. This policy in the Victorian constitution, makes it harder for future governments to change the law.

=== Foreign policy ===
As Premier, Andrews priortised relations between with China and ministers were directed to visit in their official capacity.

His government signed a memorandum of understanding (MoU) with the Chinese government under the Belt and Road Initiative in October 2018, but kept its details secret until he released it five weeks later. The MoU involved cooperation on facilities connectivity, unimpeded trade, finance, people-to-people bonds, and the "Digital Silkroad". Cooperation was to be in the form of "dialogue, joint research, pilot programs, knowledge sharing, and capacity building". Andrews said at the time that the MoU "does not bind Victoria to be involved in any specific project or initiative" and "the government will consider both the Victorian and national interest before agreeing to be involved in any specific activity".

On 21 April 2021, the Commonwealth Government used its veto powers to cancel the agreements made between Victoria and China under the Belt and Road Initiative.
