= Level Crossing Removal Project =

Infrastructure project in the state of Victoria, Australia

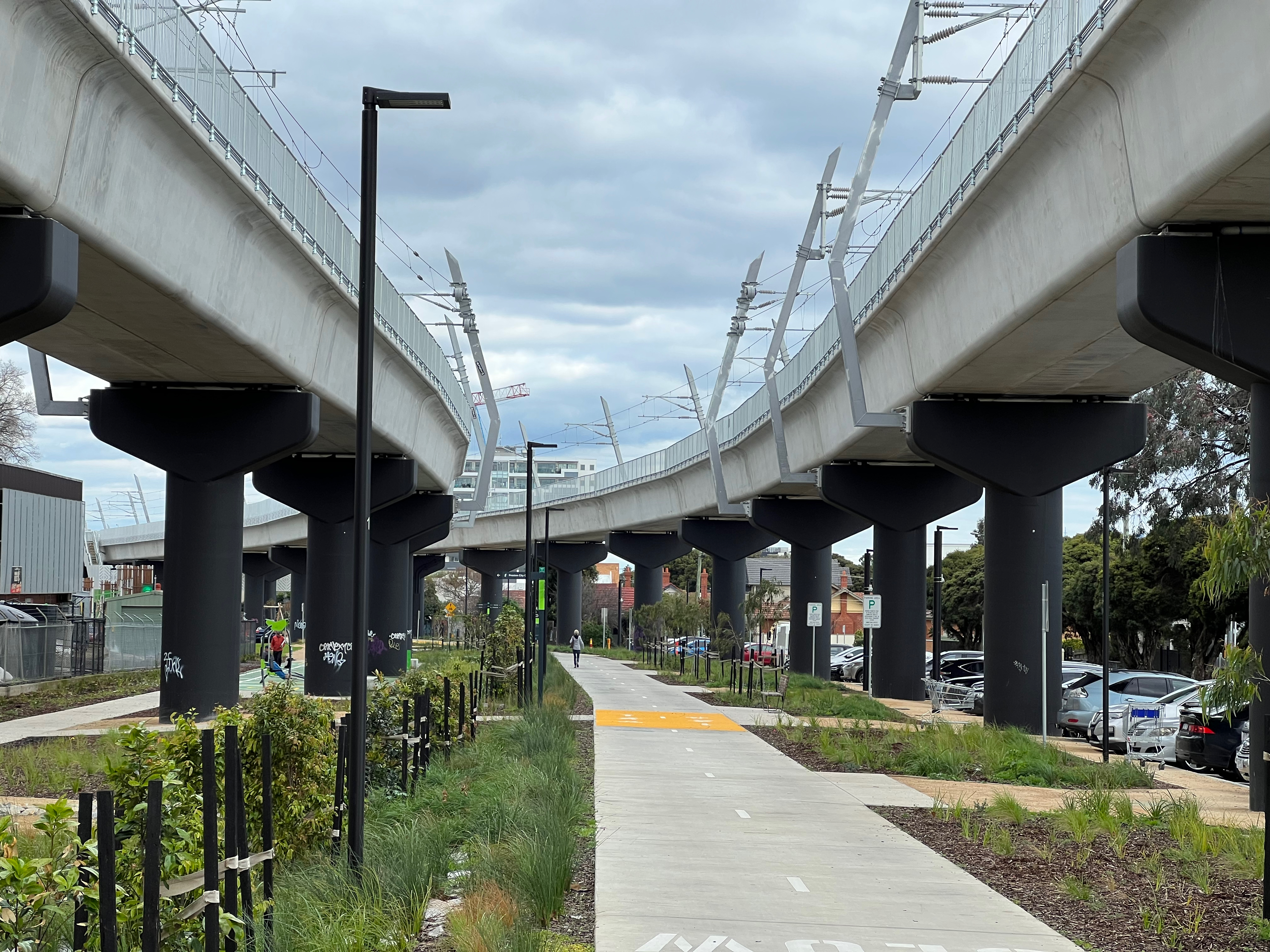
- Elevated rail near the rebuilt Preston station.

Project overview
- Formed: March 2015
- Type: Project team
- Jurisdiction: Melbourne
- Headquarters: Melbourne
- Minister responsible: Vicki Ward, Minister for Public Transport
- Project executive: Matthew Gault, CEO (of the Victorian Infrastructure Delivery Authority)
- Parent department: Department of Transport and Planning
- Parent authority: Victorian Infrastructure Delivery Authority
- Website: bigbuild.vic.gov.au

The Level Crossing Removal Project (LXRP) is a project to remove and grade-separate 110 level crossings and to rebuild 51 stations on the metropolitan and regional rail network of the Melbourne, Victoria, Australia. The project aims to improve network efficiency, rail safety, and reduce traffic congestion.

After pledging the removal of 50 level crossings at the 2014 Victorian state election, the Andrews government committed A$2.4 billion in the 2015–2016 budget to remove the first 20 crossings by 2018. The next 30 crossings were notionally funded through the hypothecation of the sale proceeds from the privatisation of the Port of Melbourne. Prior to the 2018 state election, the government committed to remove a further 25 level crossings, using a new prioritisation framework.

In 2021, the government announced a further ten level crossing removals and four level crossing closures would occur by 2025, bringing the total planned level crossing removals to 85 by 2025. In 2022, the Andrews government announced the removal of an additional 25 level crossings by 2033, (Note: The date was revised from 2030 to 2033 across two announcements in 2026 (see below).) bringing the total to 110. (Note: Or 121 including add-ons and closures.) At the conclusion of the project, the Cranbourne, Pakenham, Lilydale, Frankston, Sunbury, and Werribee lines (with the exception of the Altona Loop) will have no road-rail level crossings for their entire length.

Previously its own administrative agency, in 2019 the LXRP became a project within the Major Transport Infrastructure Authority, an office of the Victorian Department of Transport and Planning. As of September 2026, 96 crossings have been removed and 50 train stations have been built or rebuilt as part of the project. (Note: Following a classification change in 2021, crossing closures past this date do not count toward the total. Thus, 104 crossings have been removed in total, including crossing closures.)

== Background ==
When Melbourne's rail network was built, many road-railway crossings were via level crossing rather than bridges or underpasses due to the city's flat topography and sparse population. As traffic levels increased, these became bottlenecks for road and rail traffic, limiting the speed and frequency of train services. In 1954, the State Government established a committee to look at the removal of level crossings at Clifton Hill, Elsternwick, Footscray, Moorabbin, and Newport. These projects were completed by 1960.

In 1983, the level crossing at Station Street, Box Hill, was removed. Other level crossing removals include Dorset Road, Boronia, in 1998 and Middleborough Road, Laburnum, in 2007. In the early 2010s, level crossings were removed at Nunawading (2010), Springvale (2014), Sunshine (2014), and Mitcham (2014).

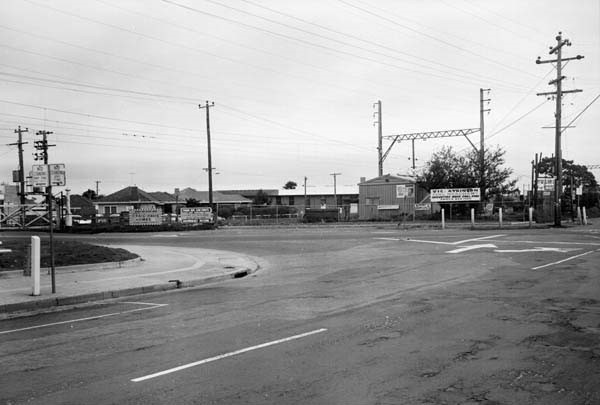
The level crossing at Clayton Road, Clayton prior to its removal.

As of 2014, there were 176 level crossings left on metropolitan Melbourne's rail network (4 of which involved tram lines) and 228 places where railways had been separated from roads; by the end of the LXRP, 66 level crossings will remain. Over two-thirds of these grade separations were constructed between 1863 and 1918, with fewer than one level crossing removal per year between 1918 and 2015. The commitment by the government to remove 110 (Note: Or 121 including add-ons and closures.) level crossings over sixteen years, by 2032, represents the fastest rate of crossing removals in Melbourne's history.

== History ==
=== 2014 election commitments ===
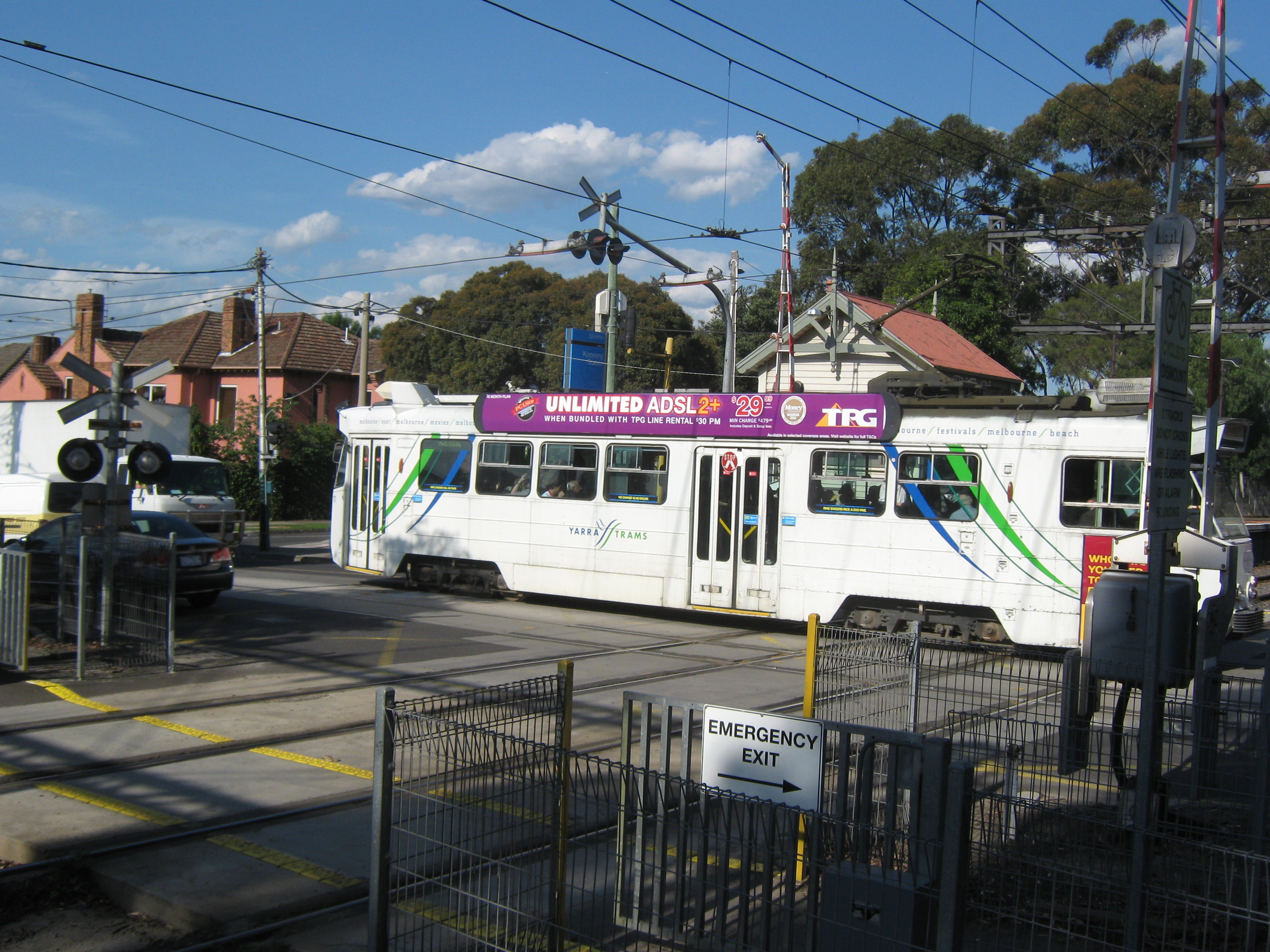
The crossing at Glenferrie Road, Kooyong was not included on the original removal list, despite being marked as a priority by VicRoads.

In June 2014, five months prior to the Victorian state election, VicRoads compiled a report of the most dangerous level crossings in Victoria and handed it to the Napthine Liberal-Nationals government. In its 2014 state election manifesto, the then Labor opposition announced that, if elected, it would remove 50 level crossings by grade separation, with 20 to be removed by 2018. Although the majority of crossings announced by Opposition Leader Daniel Andrews were included in the priority list, ten of the crossings highlighted by VicRoads were not on the opposition's list. The sites of all 50 level crossing removals were progressively announced over the following two years after the election of the Andrews government in November 2014.

In September 2016, the Port of Melbourne lease concluded, providing $9.7 billion for infrastructure, including funding for the remaining 30 level crossing removals to be completed by mid-2022.

=== 2018 election commitments ===
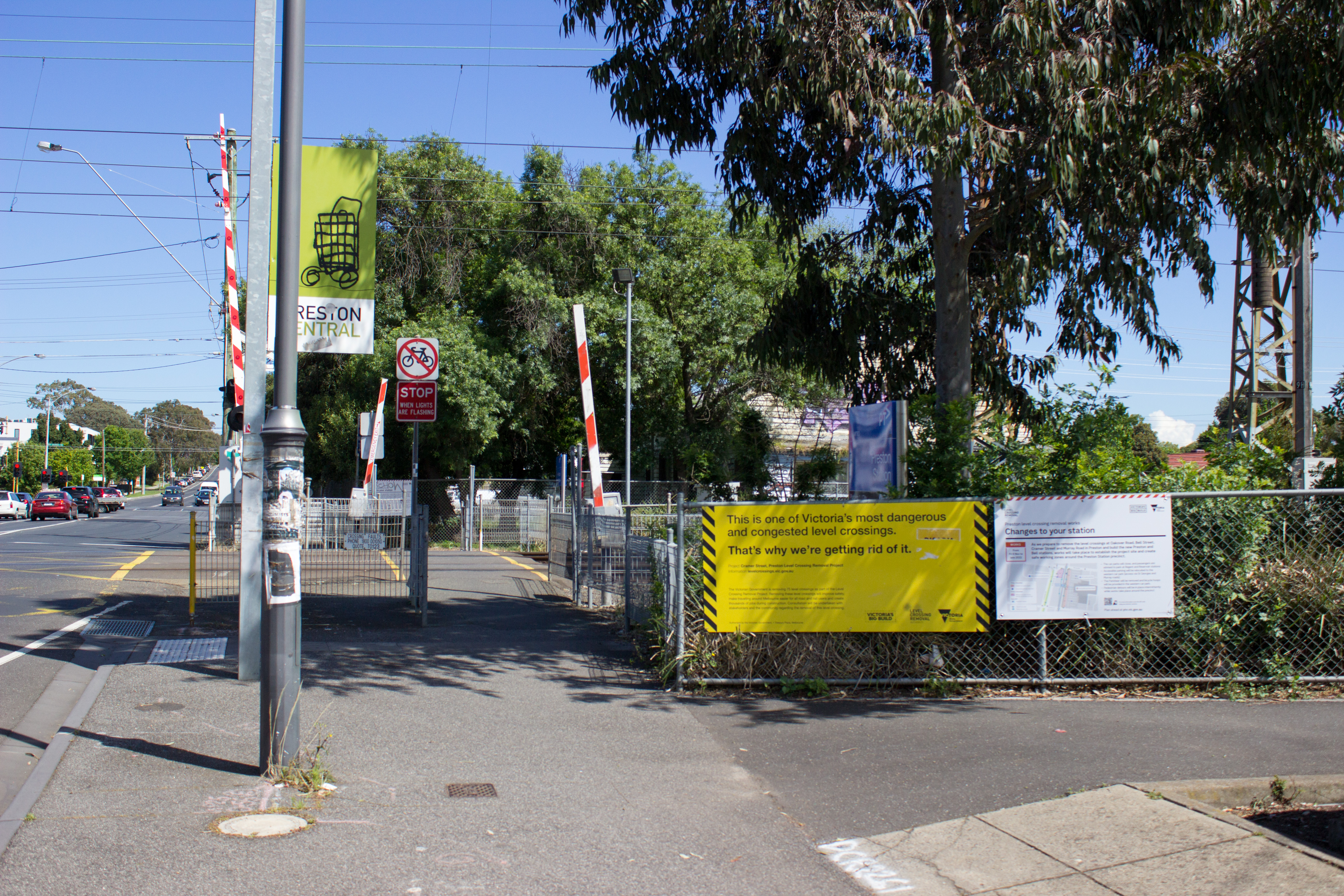
A project sign in 2020 indicating that the crossing at Cramer Street, Preston will be removed.

In October 2018, the LXRP surpassed the State Government's 2014 election commitment of removing 20 level crossings by 2018, having officially removed 29 crossings. In the lead up to the 2018 state election, Victorian Premier Daniel Andrews pledged to remove a further 25 level crossings across Melbourne at a cost of $6.6 billion by 2025. The locations of the additional removals were announced progressively over the course of 2018 through a new prioritisation framework based on safety, congestion, and proximity to emergency services.

=== 2021 additional commitments ===
In July 2021, the State Government announced the removal of an additional ten level crossings and four closures by the end of 2025 at a cost of $2.5 billion. These removals will include the reconstruction of five stations across the network, with stations to be rebuilt at Croydon, Keon Park, Narre Warren, Parkdale, and Ringwood East. At the conclusion of these additional 35 removals, the Pakenham, Cranbourne, and Lilydale lines will have no road level crossings for their entire length, with these announcements pushing the number of crossing removals to 85 by 2025.

=== 2022 election commitments ===
In the lead up to the 2022 state election, the Andrews government announced a further 25 level crossing removals, bringing the total number of removals to 110 by 2030. Many of these removals will be delivered together and include a number of closures. In September 2022, the premier announced eight crossings would be removed in Brunswick on the Upfield line. The eight crossings would be removed by 2027 (later revised to 2030) and would include the rebuilding of Jewell, Brunswick, and Anstey stations. The government announced elevated rail would be built along the corridor from Royal Park to Moreland Road, meeting the elevated rail built as part of the 2022 level crossing removal works, and would include an upgrade of the Upfield Bike Path.

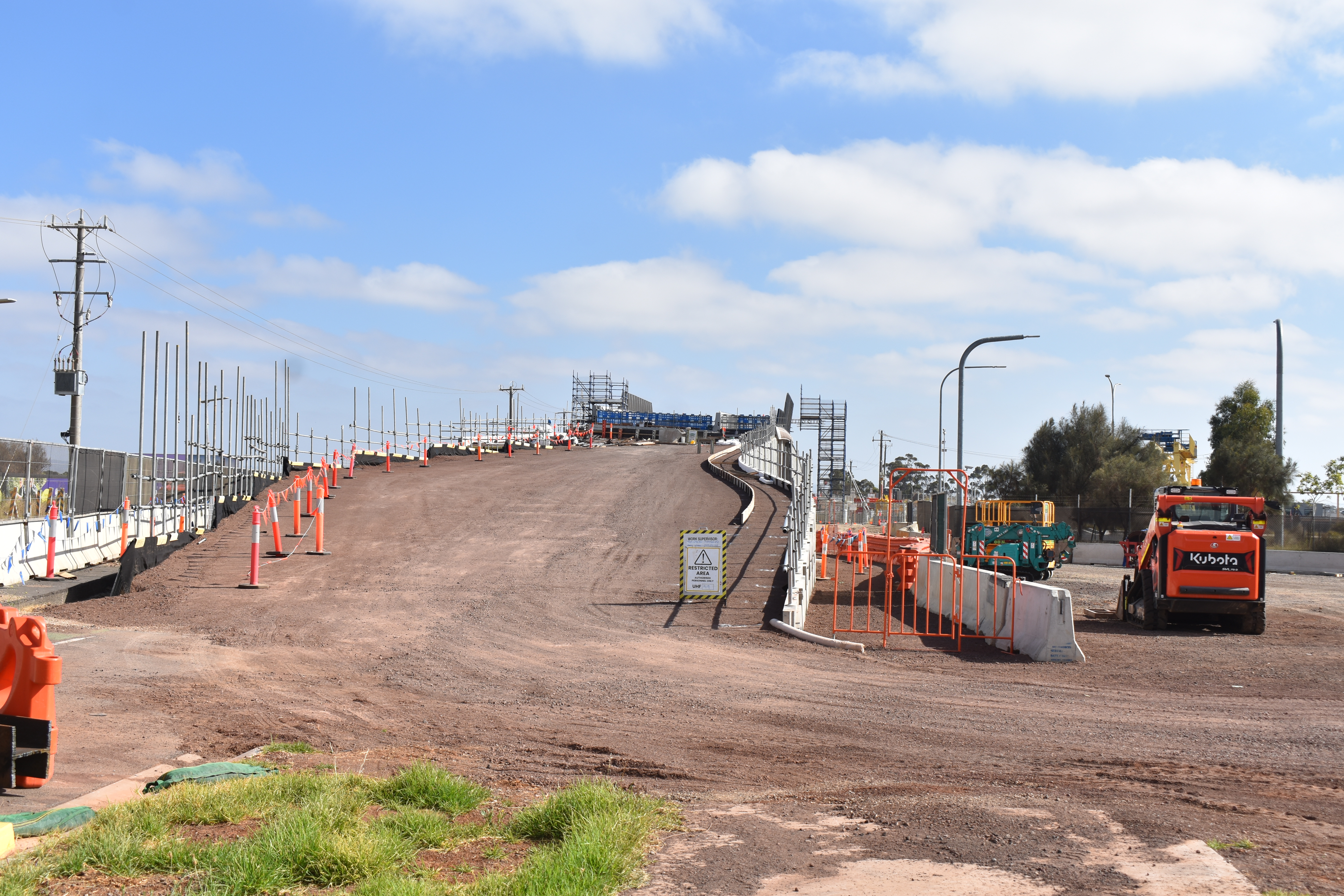
Construction of a road overpass over the rail line at Ferris Road, Cobblebank

In October 2022, the government committed to removing an extra four level crossings on the Ballarat line between Caroline Springs and Melton stations by 2028. Proposed removal methods for the level crossings at Exford Road and Coburns Road is by constructing a rail trench (since revised to a rail bridge) and lowering Melton station, while the roads will be elevated over tracks to get rid of the Hopkins Road and Ferris Road level crossings. Seven more crossing removals and two closures were announced in October 2022 for the Frankston line. These level crossings would be removed by 2029 and would make the line level crossing free for its entire length. Four stations will be rebuilt as part of the removals at Highett, Mordialloc, Aspendale, and Seaford.

On 21 and 25 October 2022, the Andrews government announced an additional two level crossing removals for the Sunbury line and one on the Hurstbridge line. These crossings are located at Old Calder Highway and Watsons Road, Diggers Rest, and Ruthven St, Macleod. These crossings will be removed by 2026 via the construction of a road bridge for the Sunbury line removals and a rail bridge for the Hurstbridge line. At the conclusion of these removals, the Sunbury line will be fully level crossing free.

The government announced an additional three removals and two closures on the Werribee line on 27 October 2022. Along with the four already removed on the Werribee line, these removals would make the line level crossing free by 2030, and allow for additional services and the construction of the Geelong Fast Rail project. The crossings at Hudsons Road, Spotswood, Maddox Road, Newport, and Maidstone Street, Altona. These crossings will be removed with a combination of rail over and road over, and will include a newly elevated Spotswood station. The crossings at Anderson Street, Yarraville, and Champion Road, Newport will be closed during the project. Pedestrian links will still remain with a plan to upgrade local roads to accommodate the closure of these crossings.

== Governance ==
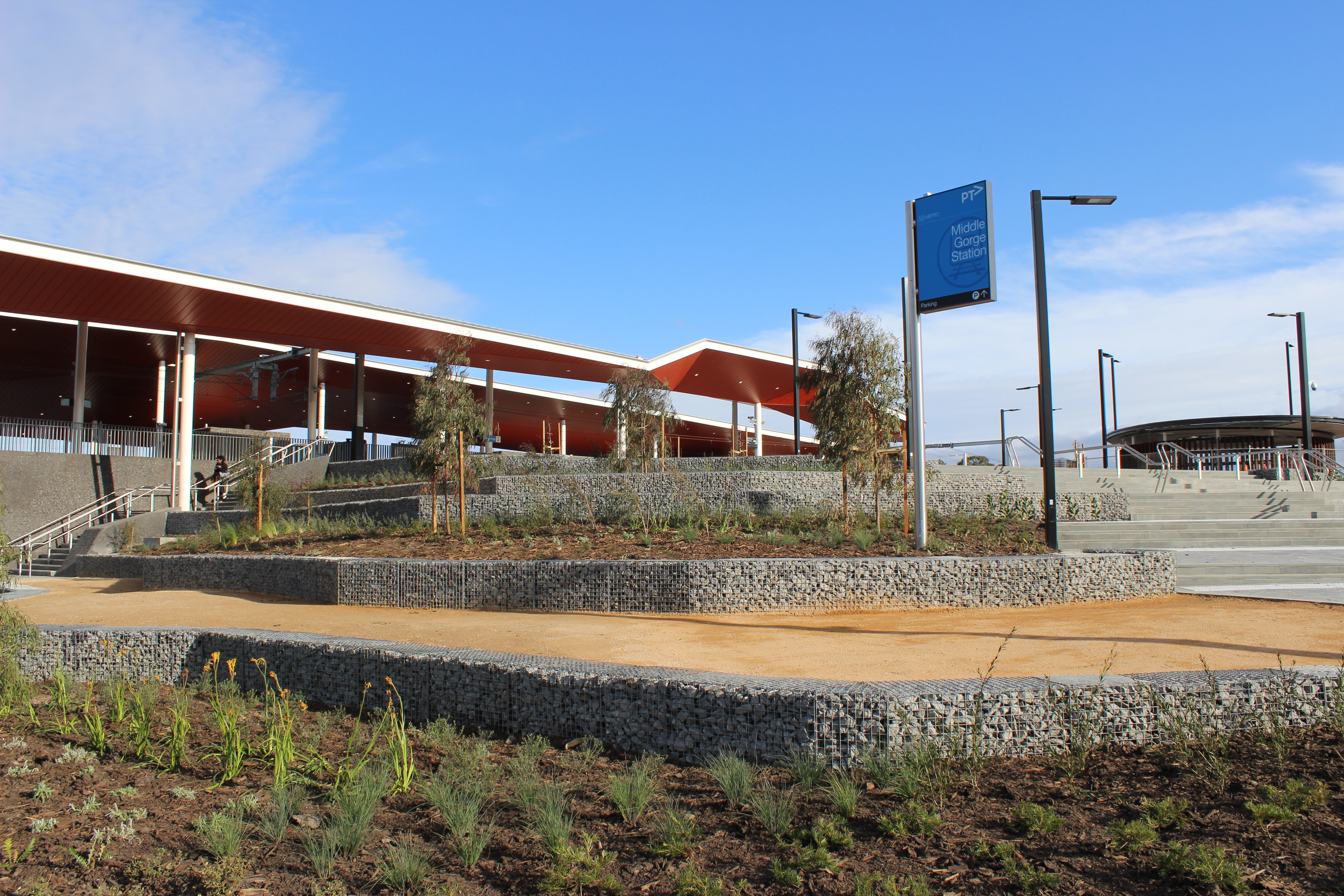
Middle Gorge station, opened as part of the Mernda rail extension in 2018.

The Level Crossing Removal Authority (LXRA) was formed in May 2015 as an administrative office of the then-new Department of Economic Development, Jobs, Transport and Resources to deliver the project.

Later, the LXRA led delivery of other rail projects, including extension of the South Morang line to Mernda, upgrades of the Hurstbridge and Cranbourne lines, as well as a rebuilt Frankston station. The authority also delivered a new stabling facility north of Wyndham Vale station and train storage at Kananook.

The LXRA was abolished as an independent administrative office following the 2018 state election, with its functions absorbed into the newly formed Major Transport Infrastructure Authority at the Department of Transport.

== Architecture and urban design ==
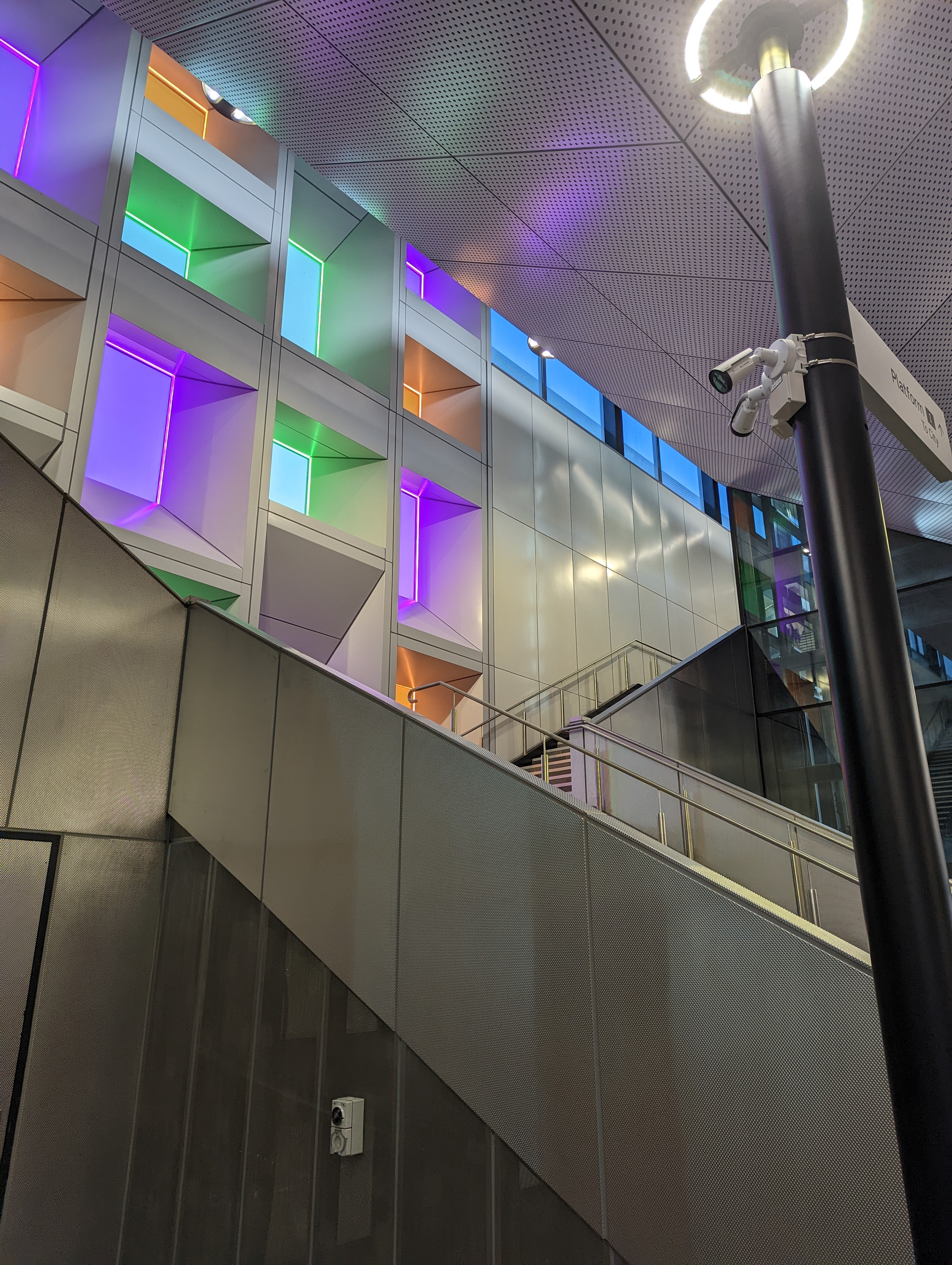
The interior of the rebuilt Bell station in Preston, showing stained glass windows behind the staircase that leads to the city-bound platform.

The LXRP has used several different design approaches to removing level crossings, tailoring designs to different urban settings around Melbourne. Most projects, particularly those in the denser inner- and middle-suburbs, have involved lowering the rail line into a trench or elevating the rail line above the road. Some projects in outer suburbs, such as Gap Road near Sunbury station or Station Street near Beaconsfield station, have involved lowering or raising the road without altering the existing rail corridor. This is enabled by the additional space surrounding the railway line.

As noted by University of Melbourne researchers in 2016, the scale of the project had significant urban renewal implications for the city:

Each crossing removal affects, on average, at least a kilometre of rail corridor and, within the urban area, this usually includes a station. In some instances, topography has required the removal of more than one crossing to meet rail engineering requirements as well as longer sections of corridor becoming part of the works. On the face of it, this means that the current seventy-five crossing removals could result in seventy-five kilometres of transformed rail corridors and fifty-seven new stations – more than a quarter of Melbourne's total.

The researchers emphasised the urban benefits from new elevated rail over trenched rail, including the creation of new parkland and open space, arguing wider benefits could be achieved beyond reducing traffic congestion. One study examined the local public health positive and negative impacts from the removal of level crossings on the Upfield line, including significant construction impacts. The study found that by improving road connections the project could help induce more car usage, but that this could be offset by improving pedestrian and cycling connections.

Architecture of the Level Crossing Removal Project

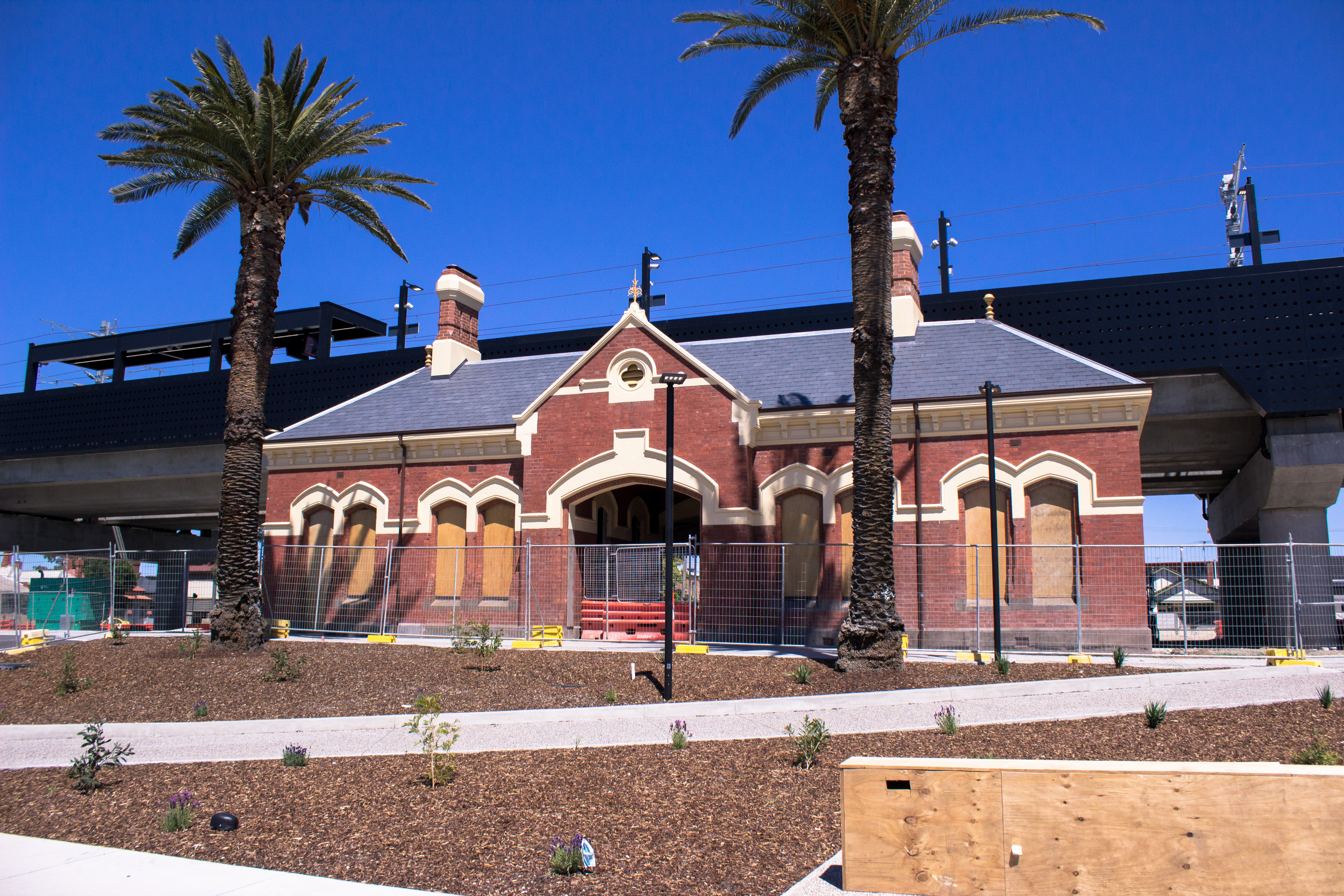
Moreland railway station shows the integration of the heritage station into the new elevated design.

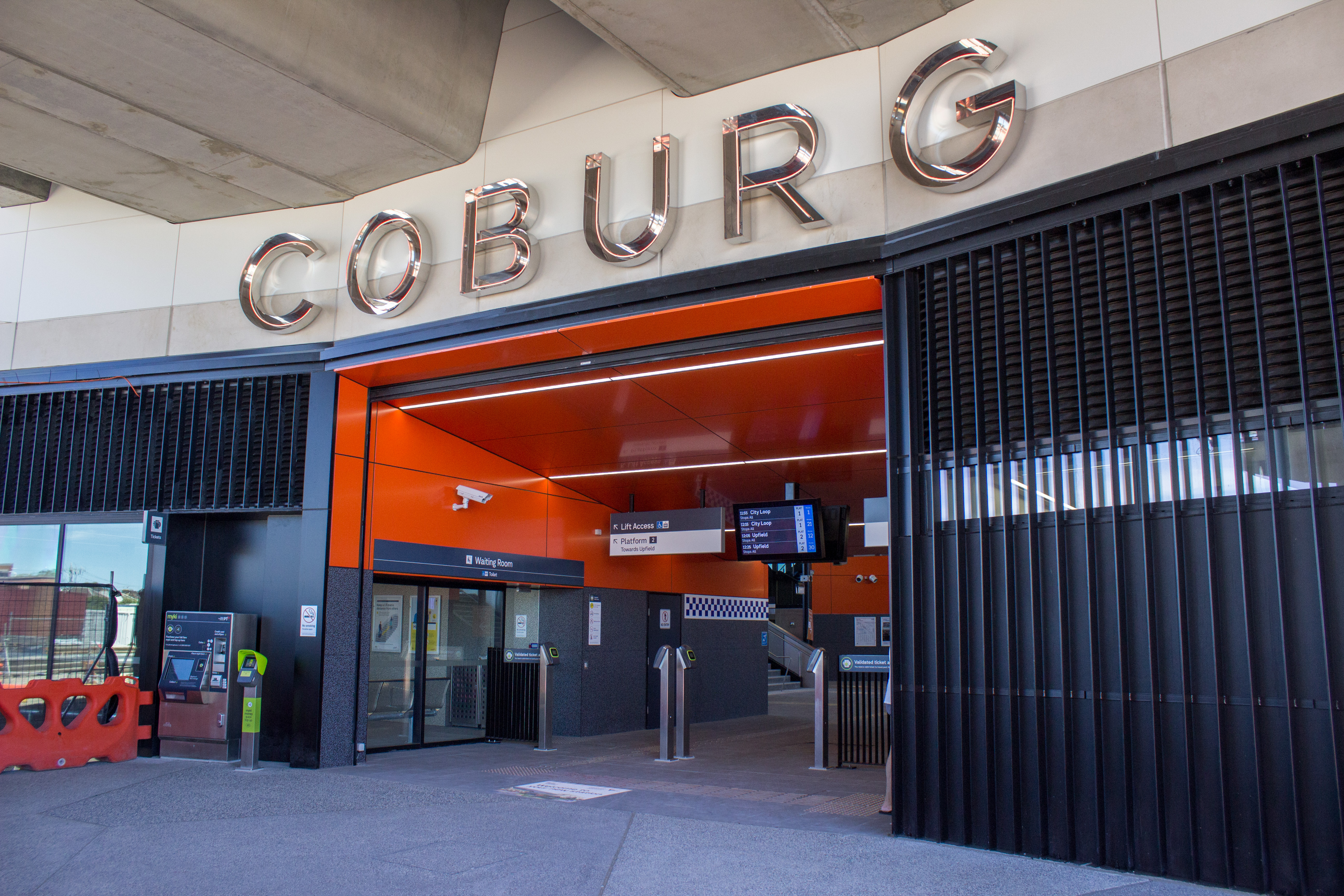
Entrance of newly elevated Coburg railway station.

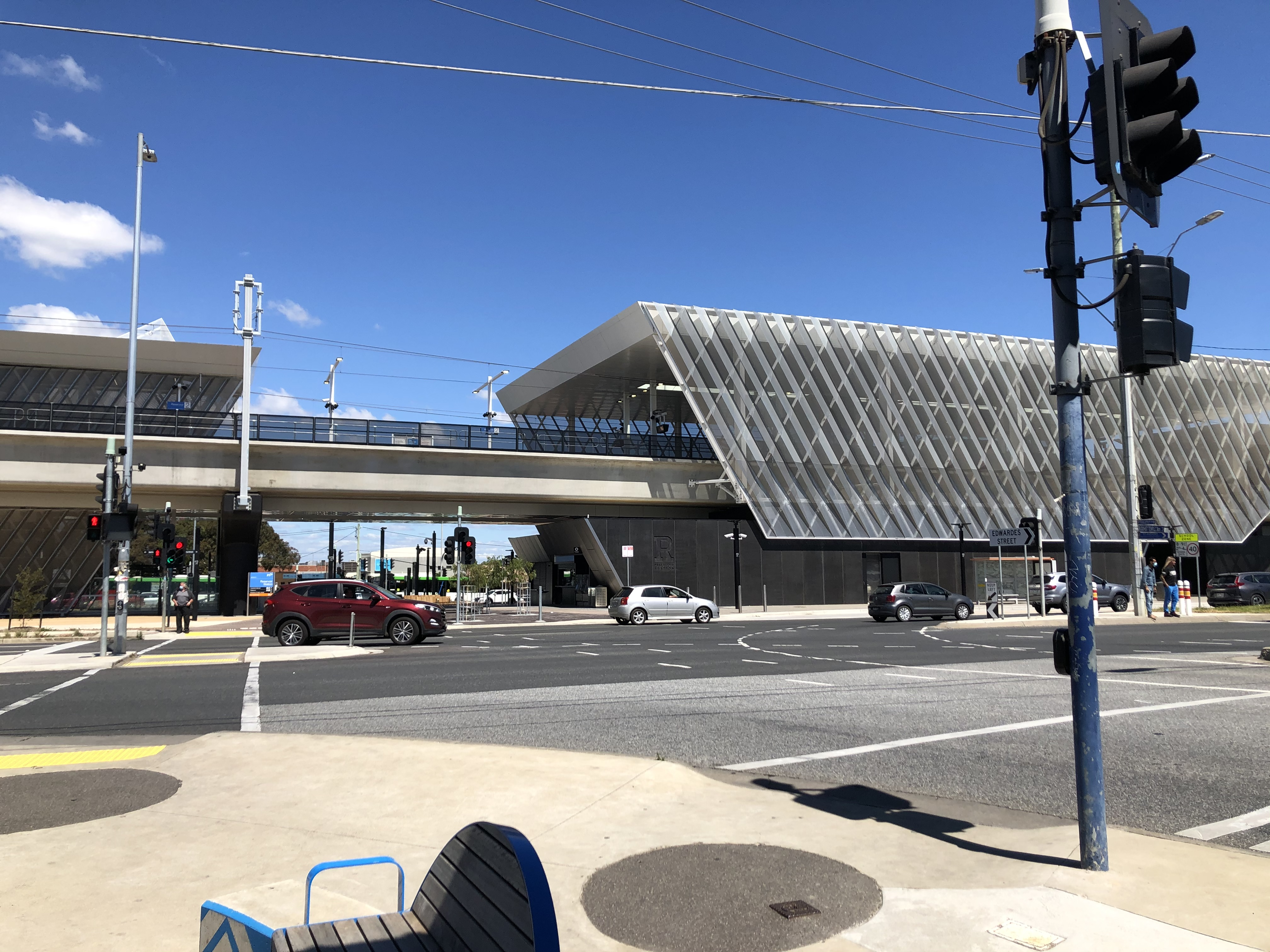
Newly elevated Reservoir railway station.

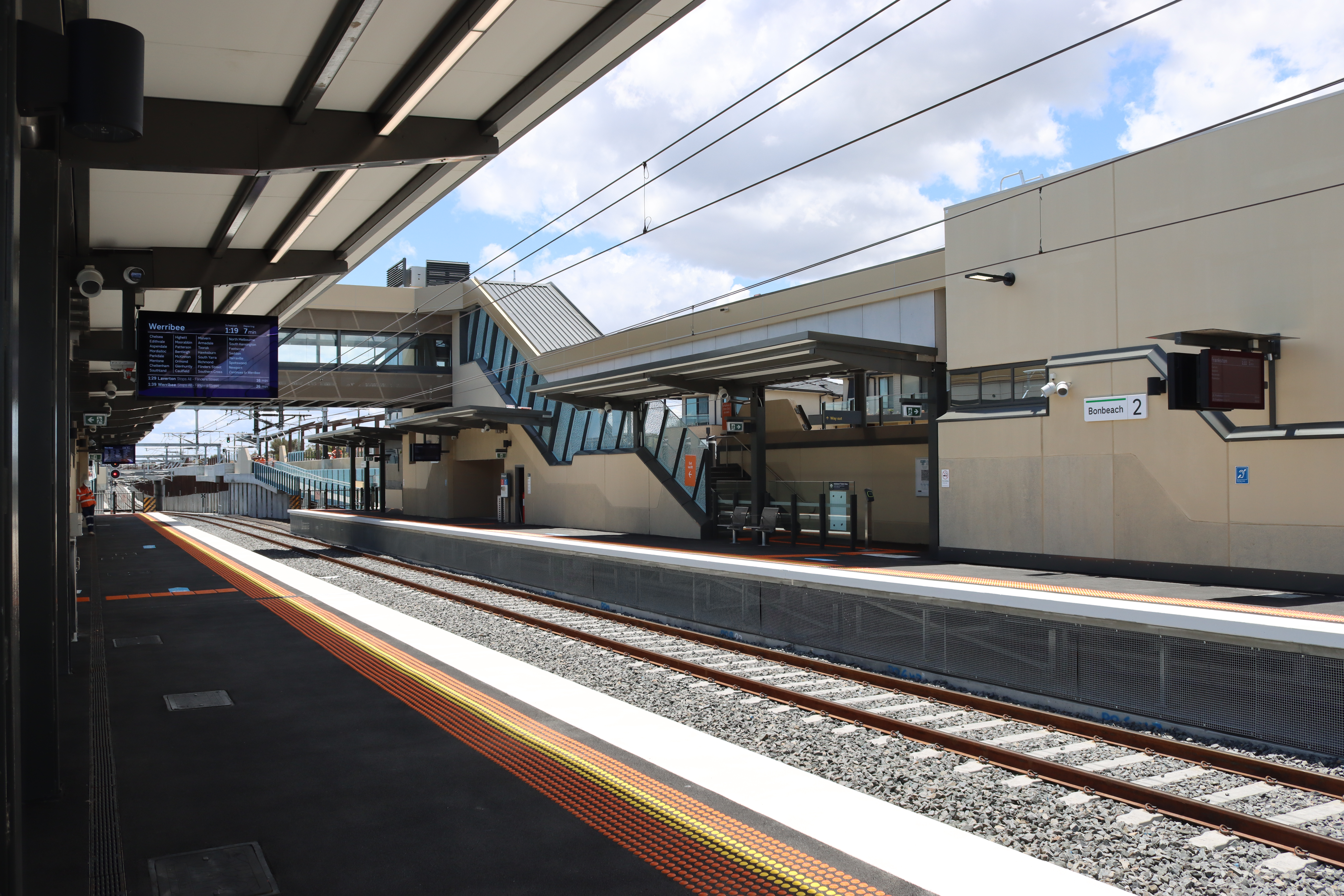
Bonbeach railway station displays the project's sunken station designs.

=== Awards ===
The LXRP has received numerous awards for their different projects in the categories of sustainability, architecture, and urban design. The Reservoir station project was presented the 'Special Prize Exterior' award in the Passenger Stations category at the World Architecture and Design Award at the 2021 Prix Versailles. The Toorak Road level crossing removal topped the infrastructure category of the Australian Institute of Landscape Architects awards due to the design of the new public parkland, cycling paths, and open space.

The elevated rail project from Moreland to Coburg stations saw landscape architects Tract win the Infrastructure Award of Excellence for their landscape and urban design work on the project, with the judging panel "particularly impressed with the urban renewal of the area". The Bell to Moreland project was also awarded a score of 98 points from the Infrastructure Sustainability Council (ISC), the highest rating ever awarded in Australia.

=== Elevated rail ===
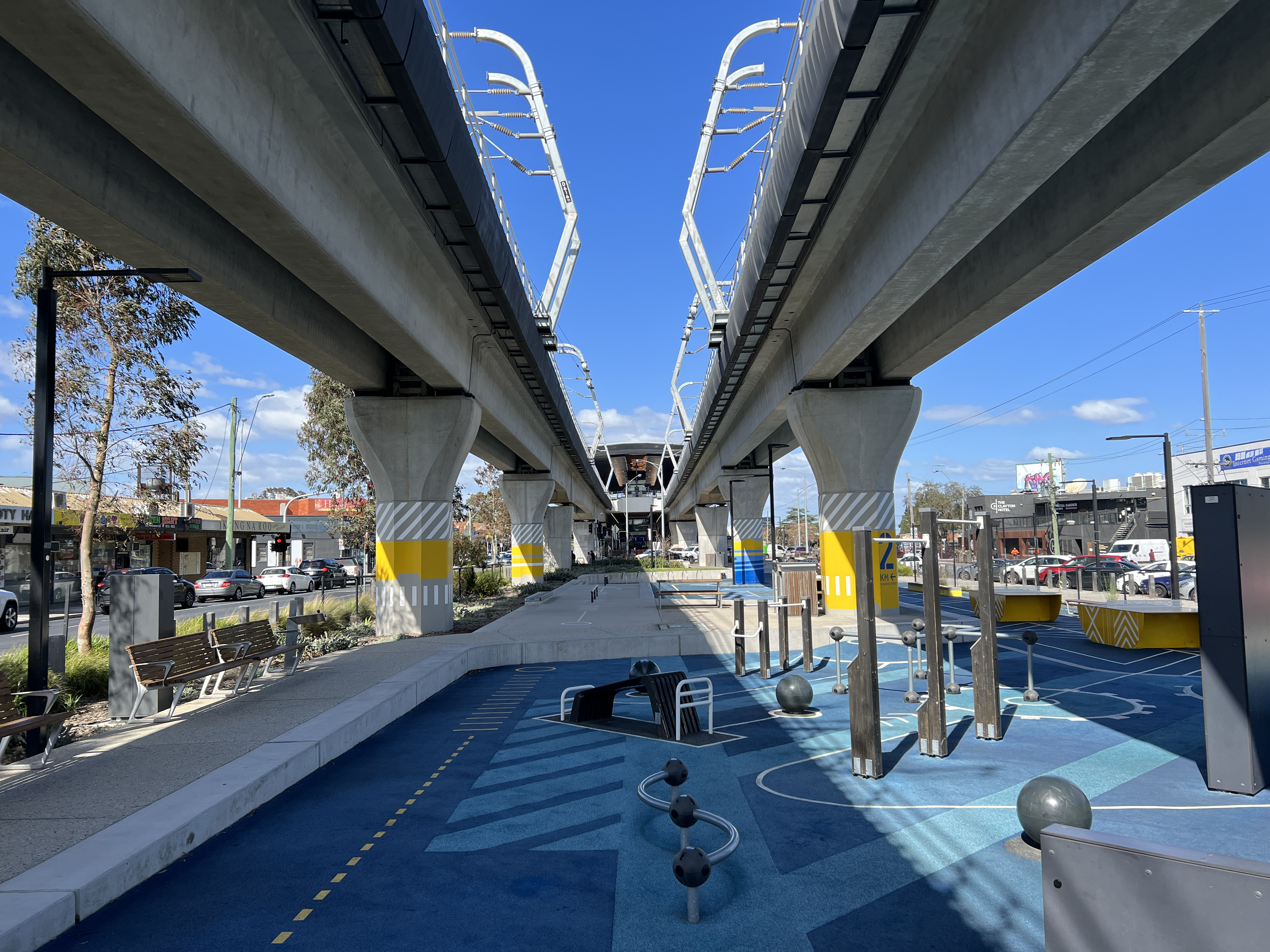
Recreational space created by the LXRP beneath the newly elevated rail line at Clayton station in Melbourne's south-east

Some of the most significant changes to Melbourne's urban structure from the LXRP have resulted from the construction of large sections of elevated rail, something that was relatively rare in Melbourne. In 2016, the government announced that 8.3 kilometres (5.2 mi) of elevated rail would be built in Melbourne's south-eastern suburbs to remove nine level crossings on the Pakenham and Cranbourne rail corridor and build five new elevated stations at Carnegie, Murrumbeena, Hughesdale, Clayton, and Noble Park.

Dubbed "sky rail" by opponents and some media outlets, the LXRP spurred significant local opposition due to concerns over visual and noise impacts, and lack of consultation. The project became a political issue in the 2018 state election, although one opinion poll commissioned by The Age newspaper found 60% of Victorians supported the use of elevated rail to remove level crossings, and the government was returned at the election with an increased majority. Prior to the election, the government announced more sections of elevated rail on the Pakenham line.

Some experts argued elevated rail offered a better urban outcome than trenched rail, providing opportunities for more open space, economic development, better local connections and less disruption from construction. The Caulfield to Dandenong level crossing removals created a large new section of open parkland, dubbed a "linear park". This included 22.5 hectares (56 acres) of new open space, sports courts, playgrounds, new walking and cycling trails, and expanded station forecourts. As part of the project, the Djerring Trail was created, a 17-kilometre (11 mi) shared-use path along the rail corridor. In the year after the elevated rail opened in 2018, the media reported that many residents, including some who were opposed to the project, were happy with the outcome and utilised the new open space.

The rebuilt station at Keon Park was located 100 m south across the road from its original position, moving it within 4–5 metres of existing apartments. Residents have raised concerns over lack of privacy, station lights shining into apartments, and noise issues and have asked for double or triple glazed windows instead of a voluntary buyout. The project manager said overhead transmission lines meant the original station location would not be viable, and that the level crossing removal team had consulted with the community to adapt the station design.

Residents in the Nightingale Village apartments expressed similar concerns with current plans for the Anstey station level crossing removal, calling for the new station to be moved south of Hope Street (an extra 180 m south), rather than moving the new station between West and Hope Streets (200 m south of its current location). These calls have been prompted by the close proximity (~1 metre) of apartment balconies from the proposed station. Residents believe the currently vacant land east of their proposed alternative will provide space for the station, allowing for better bus connections, and future developments to be better integrated with the station. However, the LXRP has said that moving the station south of Hope Street would require significant property acquisition, create negative impacts on the heritage listed Lux Foundry building, and increase walking distances for commuters.

=== Tree removal ===
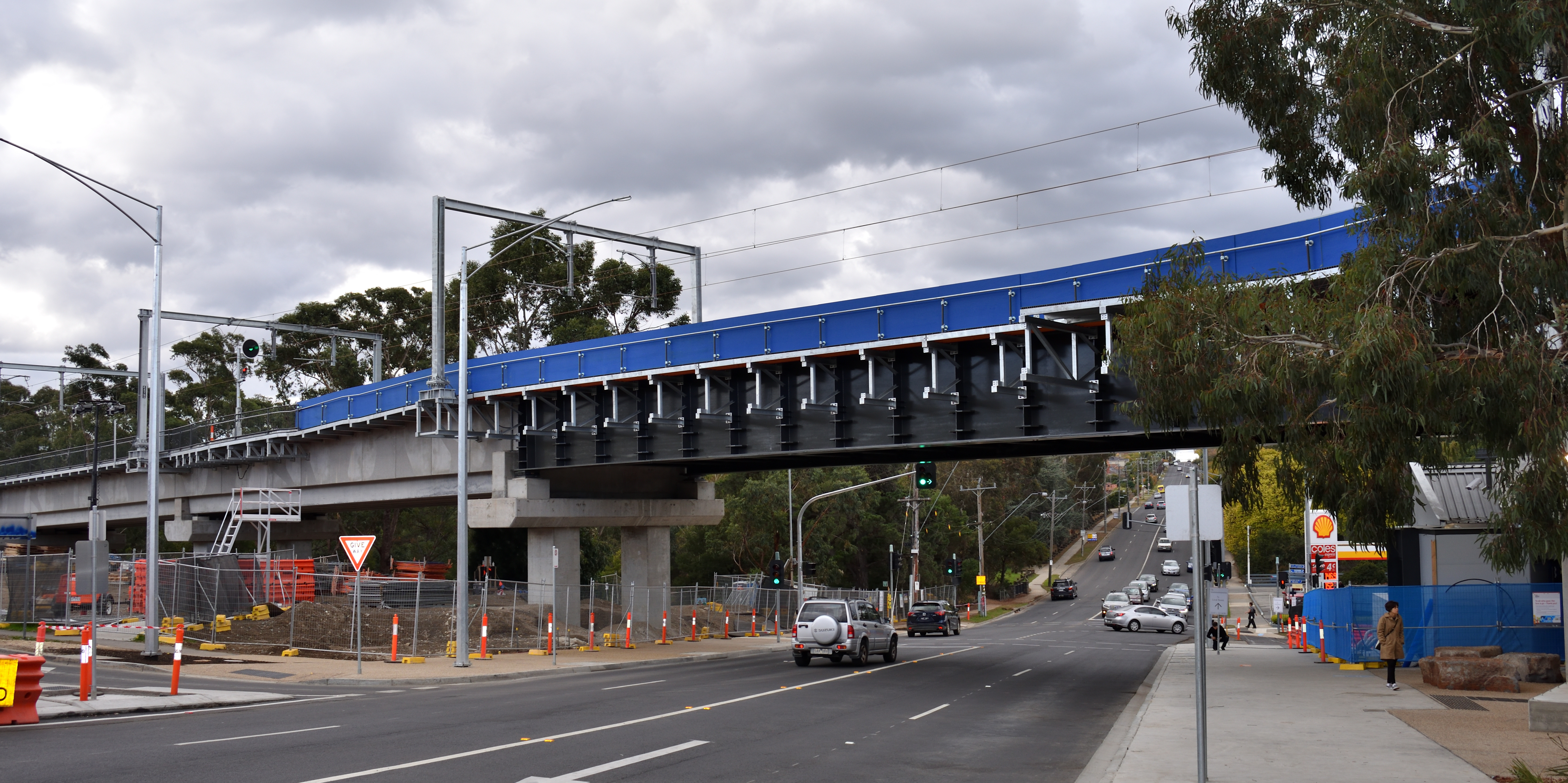
Construction at the level crossing removal at Lower Plenty Road near Rosanna railway station in 2018, with mature river red gums in background.

The removal of mature trees for level crossing removal works has been a source of controversy with some local residents and project critics. Due to the nature of the LXRP, trees need to be cut down or relocated from the site to allow for construction works. This is a particular issue for projects where the rail line is lowered into a trench, such as the planned level crossing removals near Glen Huntly station, which have required significant mature tree removal along the planned one-kilometre (0.6 mi) rail trench. An elevated rail design was chosen to remove the level crossings near Rosanna station in part to minimise the loss of native trees, as a proposed rail trench would have required the removal of hundreds of mature river red gum trees along the corridor.

According to a newspaper report, more than 10,000 trees have been cut down since 2014 to allow for the construction of Victorian infrastructure projects—including hundreds of trees for the LXRP. During the level crossing removal at Moreland Road, a campaign against the removal of 100 mature trees was unsuccessful, with a local councillor claiming only three or four trees remained at the conclusion of the project. In response, the government has stated more trees were planted than were there originally, as part of expanded parkland at the site. The state opposition has highlighted and campaigned on tree loss due to major infrastructure projects.

=== Railway heritage ===
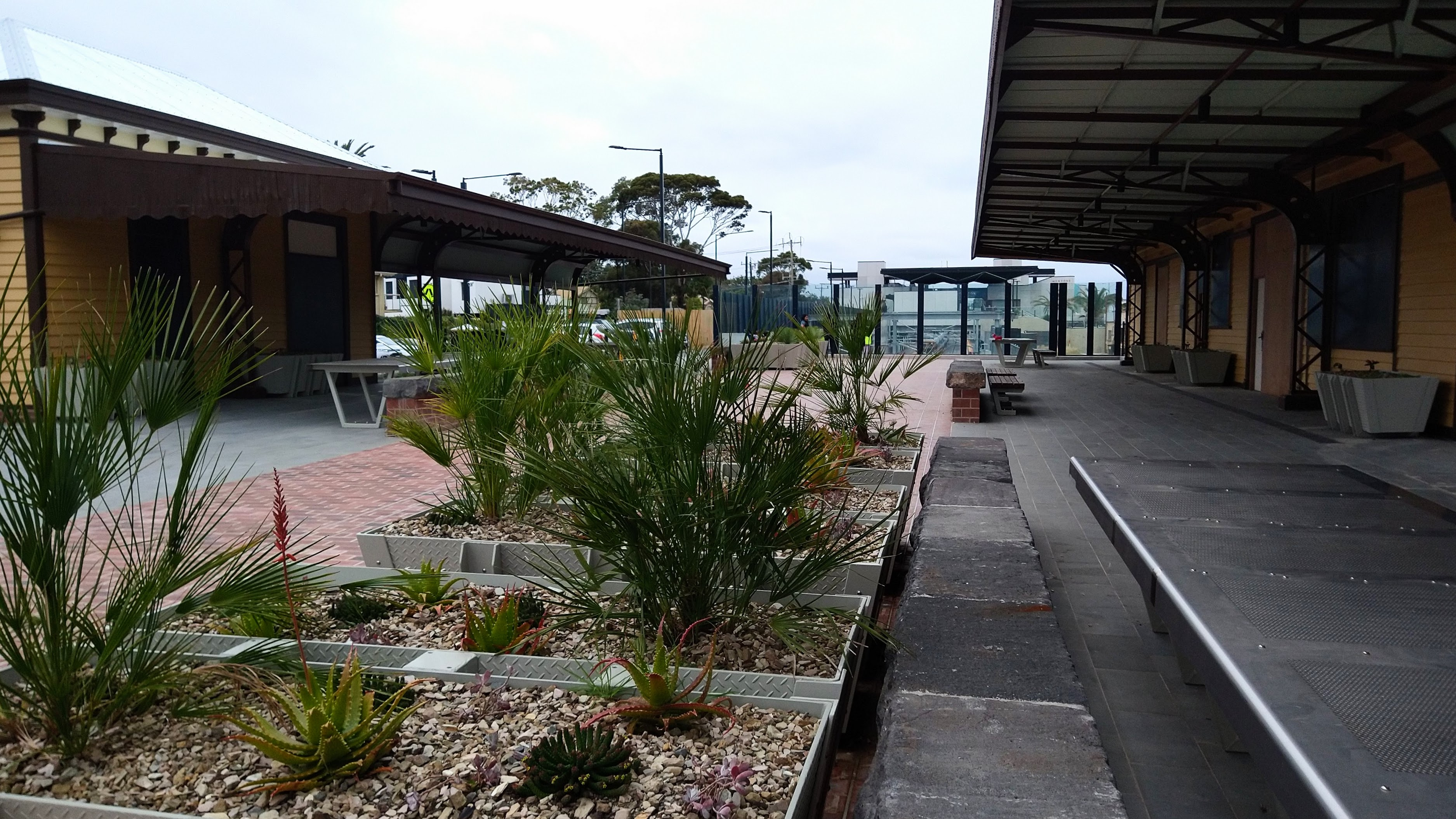
LXRP retention of the heritage-listed Mentone railway station at street-level as a heritage deck and park, above the newly lowered station.

The loss of heritage railways stations and the impact on heritage architecture has been a source of controversy and a key design consideration for the project. During the removal of a level crossing or rebuild of a railway station, heritage station buildings or existing railway infrastructure may be impacted. Some heritage buildings have been demolished, while others have been retained, moved or adapted for other uses, such as at Clayton and Mentone stations.

At the Warrigal Road level crossing removal, Kingston Council have called for heritage protection for the heritage Parkdale railway station buildings. This request has been denied by the Department of Environment, Land, Water and Planning as well as Heritage Victoria on grounds that the structure is "not of state-level cultural heritage significance". Nonetheless, in response to the local campaign to preserve the original heritage station building, the LXRP announced it would retain and repurpose the building within the precinct, although the extent of the retention is not clear.

Other crossing removals have had their heritage structures restored for reuse. At Moreland station, the original heritage station building that opened in 1884 was restored and turned into additional station facilities. Heritage restorations are common across the removals, with other examples including the signals box at Gardiner railway station turning into bike parking, and the station building at North Williamstown railway station being restored into community and station facilities.

=== Crossing closures ===
The use of road closures to remove level crossings has been a source of controversy. The government has used crossing closures in select cases where there are nearby crossing removal projects or existing grade-separated major roads. For example, the crossings at Anderson Street, Yarraville, and Champion Road, Newport will be closed at the same time as the rail line will be elevated above Hudsons Road in nearby Spotswood and at Maddox Road in Newport with new grade-separated pedestrian and cycling crossings also built.

According to the government, this solution is required is due to the constrained site, significant heritage impacts that would arise from grade separation, and the relatively low level of car traffic on the roads, along with numerous oil and gas pipelines and the Newport Stabling Yards near Champion Road Some local residents, however, have objected to the road closures, arguing there would be significant impacts to local car journeys.

Similar objections were raised during the 2022 state election by the state opposition over the closure of Latrobe Street in Cheltenham, which similarly is located close to two other grade separated crossings completed in 2020. Local businesses, residents and the City of Greater Dandenong have petitioned against the closure of Progress Street in Dandenong, arguing there are safety and congestion concerns.

=== New and amalgamated stations ===
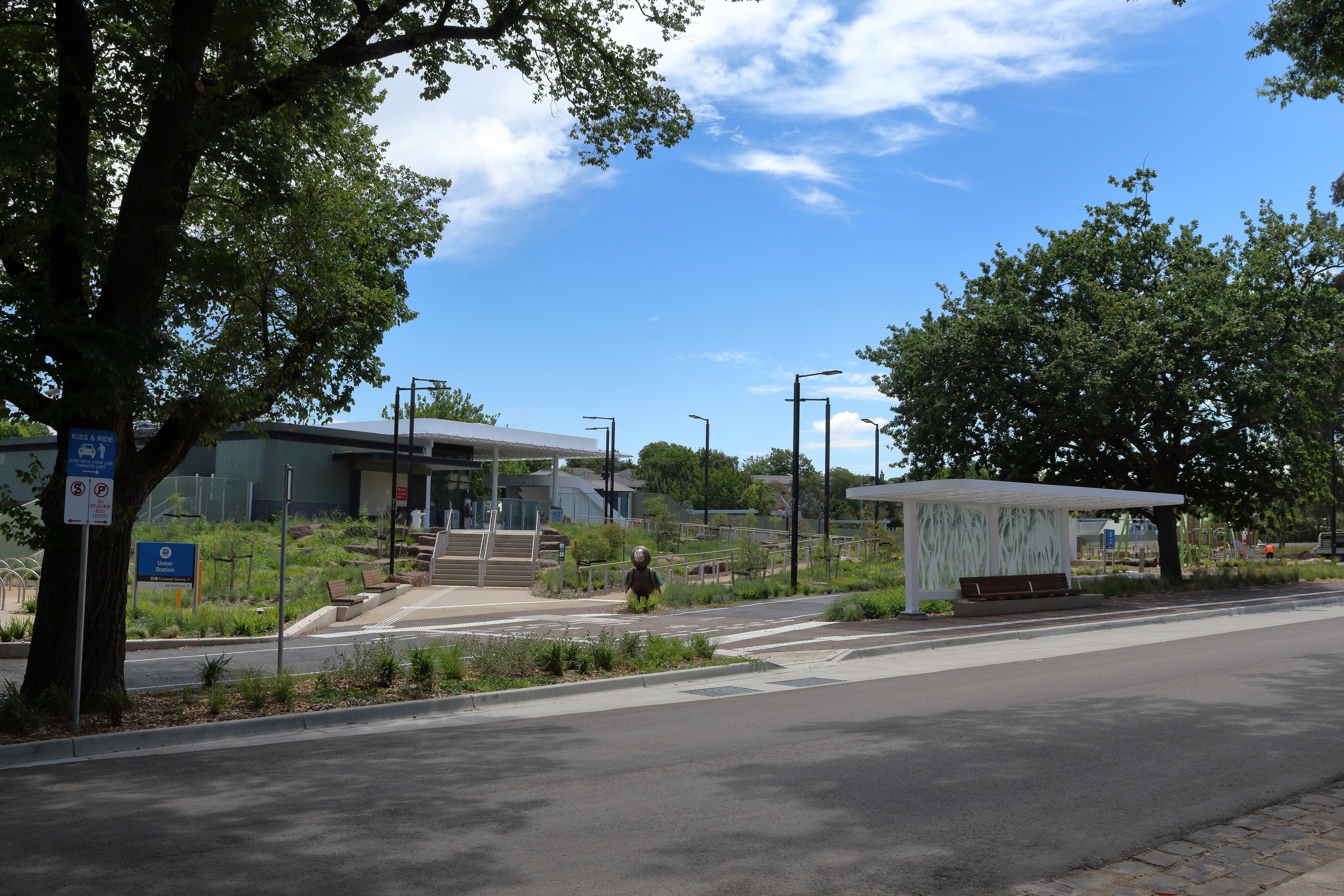
The amalgamated Union station, January 2024

Due to a large portion of level crossings also having adjacently located stations, many stations have been rebuilt as part of the project. Rebuilt stations have subsequently delivered improved facilities for passengers, including new toilet facilities, drinking fountains, increased levels of accessibility, better integration with surrounding transport connections, and higher quality architectural designs, amongst other benefits.

Whilst the majority of stations demolished as part of the project have been rebuilt and reopened, a few projects have resulted in the amalgamation of stations. Whilst controversial, these instances have usually only occurred due to the close proximity between existing stations, reducing the negative impact on users. Amalgamated stations have allowed for improved station locations, faster journey times, and higher quality facilities.

One amalgamation has included Mont Albert and Surrey Hills stations on the Belgrave and Lilydale lines. In 2023, these two stations were closed and amalgamated into the new Union station located in-between the two former locations as part of the removals of Mont Albert and Union roads project. This amalgamation has received criticism, with opponents highlighting how the increased distances from the two shopping centres on Union Road and Hamilton Street will negatively impact local mobility. Despite community criticism, this project was completed in 2023 with the removal of two level crossings and the opening of the new Union station.

On the Upfield Line, three stations having their level crossings simultaneously removed will be merged into two stations. Jewell and Brunswick stations are planned to be merged and replaced with a station outside the RMIT Brunswick campus between Union and Dawson Streets, with Anstey station moved south towards Hope Street, adjacent to part of the Nightingale Village apartments.

== Reception ==
=== Political ===
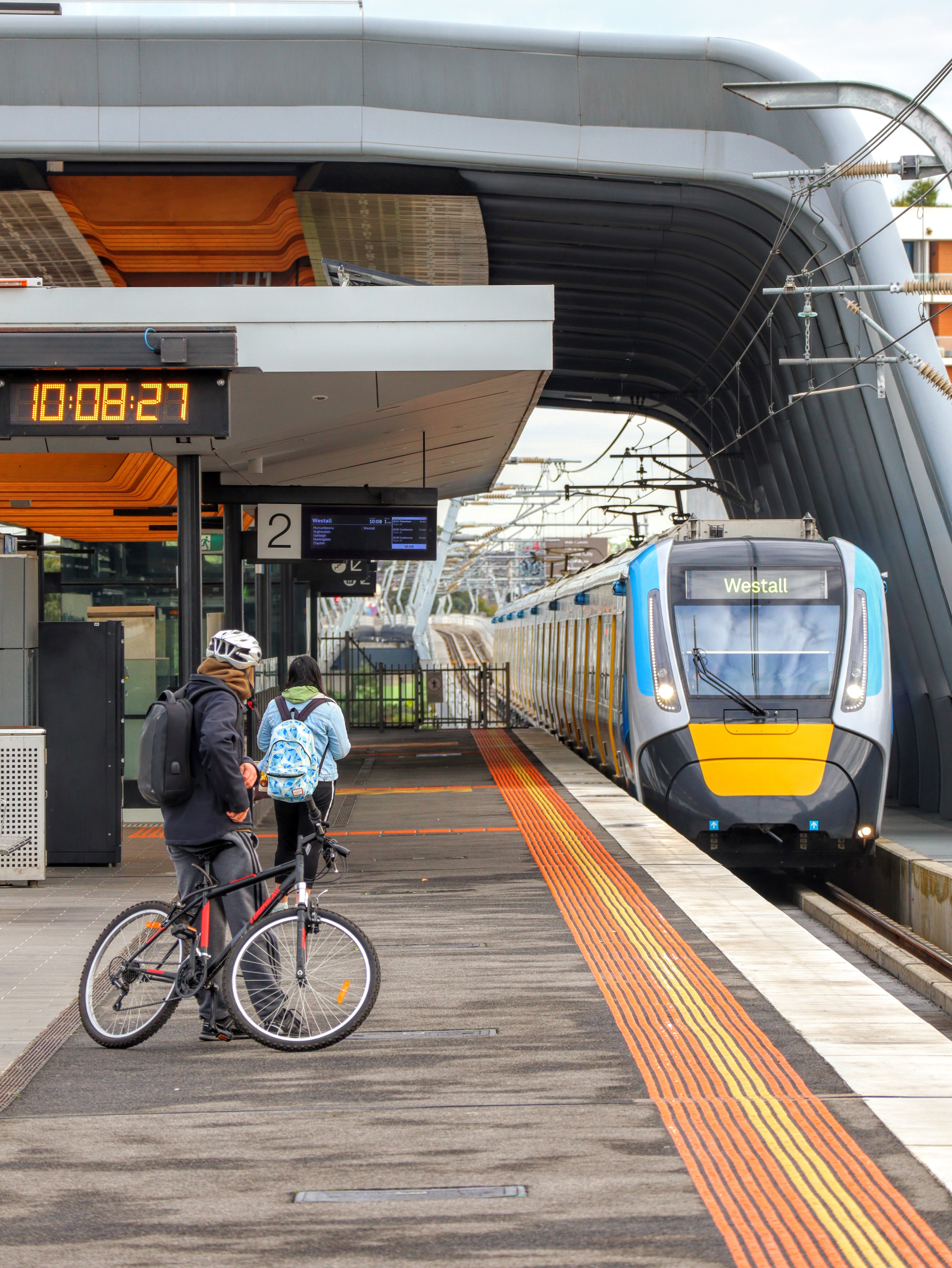
A HCMT approaches platform 2 at the newly elevated Carnegie railway station.

The LXRP has generally been seen as a political success for the Andrews government. Journalist Benita Kolovos argued it was the quick rollout of the program and the visible, tangible benefits it delivered to communities that drove its electoral success. She wrote: "It was promised at the 2014 election, construction began in the first year of the Andrews government's term and several were completed before the 2018 election. Commuters benefited from more trains, drivers from less traffic."

The government's messaging on the project has focused on these localised benefits, public safety, and the prevalence of level crossings within Melbourne. Minister for Transport Infrastructure Jacinta Allan said in 2021: "Every Victorian knows the dinging sound of boom gates coming down and the frustration that comes with it, that's why we're getting rid of them – saving lives, easing congestion and getting you home sooner."

But controversy over design choices and the cost of the project has also prompted opposition. Liberal MP Brad Rowswell criticised the Andrews government for a lack of community consultation and local feedback on the project and claimed that the government was out of touch with the community. Shadow Minister for Transport Infrastructure David Davis criticised the project for its cost, arguing that "without a comprehensive business case, there is simply no proper economic justification for the Level Crossing Removal Program". The ongoing disruption of roadworks for the project was also an issue in some suburbs.

=== Media ===
The Guardian Australia has called the program "transformational" and "suburb moulding" in comments about the Andrews government's infrastructure projects. Other local newspapers, such as The Age and Herald Sun, have been critical of the project and have highlighted local opposition in their reporting.

=== Experts and lobby groups ===
The Public Transport Users Association has campaigned for level-crossing removals, and has welcomed the LXRP and its benefits to the public transport system, with spokesman Daniel Bowen highlighting how the projects "bring a lot of pluses to the wider community, and [how] it's good to finally see progress on them." The Royal Automobile Club of Victoria have also campaigned for level crossing removals, and have welcomed announcements of crossing removals.

Academics Ian Woodcock and John Stone have highlighted the benefits from the LXRP, including its urban design opportunities and how it has contributed to the revitalisation of public transportation in Melbourne. Other academics such as Monash University researcher Graham Currie have been critical of the project, arguing the travel time savings resulting from the project were low and did not justify the cost.

=== Auditor-General ===
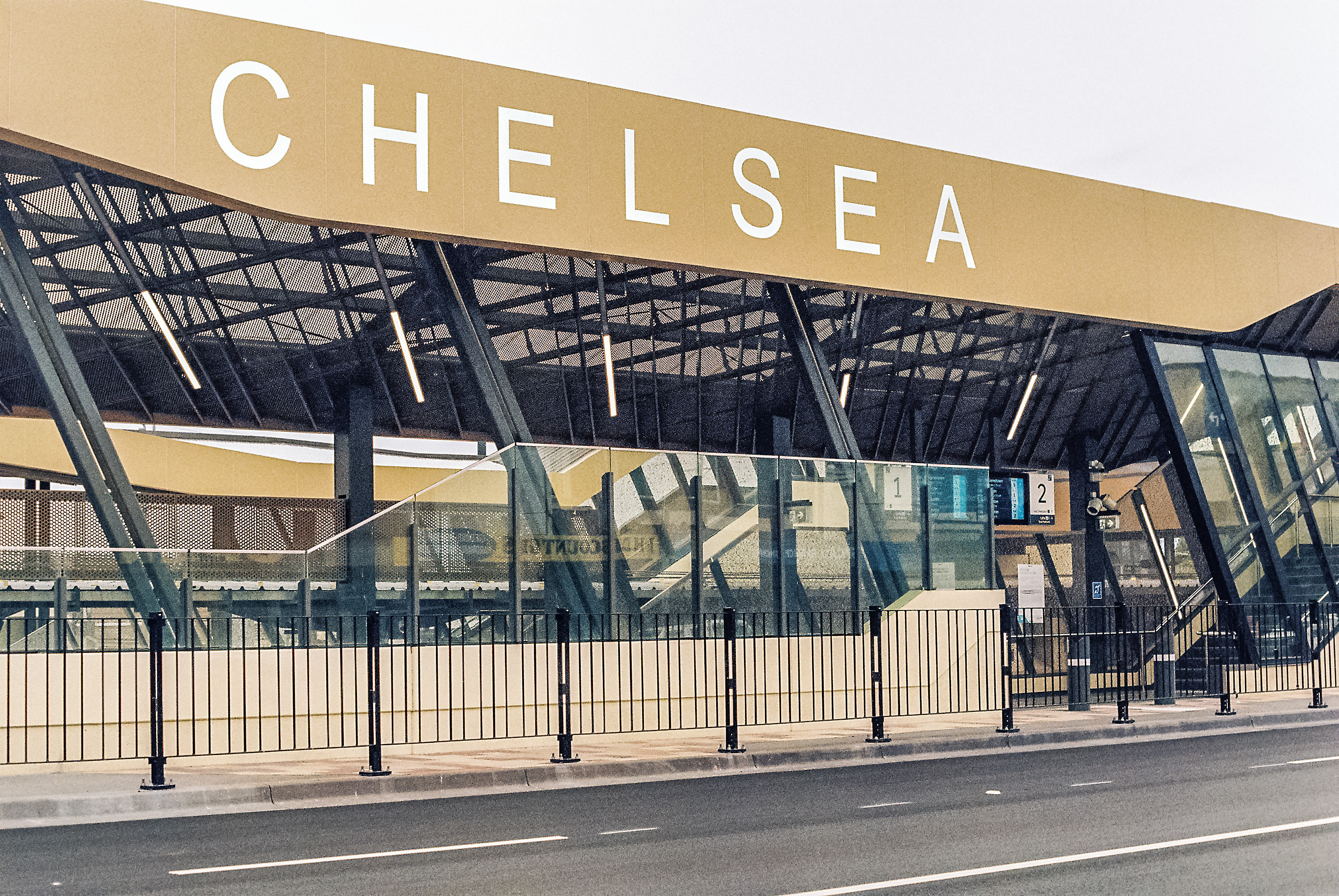
The main entrance to the new Chelsea railway station platforms.

A report released in December 2017 by the Victorian Auditor-General's Office in the LXRP's original fifty level crossing removals found that the speed and cost of the project carried significant risks. The report criticised the Level Crossing Removal Authority for its haste in delivering the program, and found that the rapid pace of the project had contributed to a failure to properly assess the merits of each grade separation. In 2017, the project's cost was found to have increased to $8.3 billion, the project is more than 38% more expensive than its initial $5–6 billion estimated price tag.

The Auditor-General criticised the selection of crossings, stating that the value of the project was compromised by the apparent political motivation for some crossing removals at the expense of more dangerous or congested intersections. In their report, the Auditor-General found that only 32 of the crossings chosen in the original 50 removals were featured in the top 50 of a 2008 list by the Department of Transport of the state's most dangerous level crossings. 28 of these were prioritised on a 2013 VicRoads removal list which was handed to the Napthine government.

Since these findings, the LXRP has developed and applied a transparent process to select sites for the additional level crossing removals. In a follow-up 2020 report, the Auditor-General stated the new process has improved the project's cost-effectiveness because it uses delivery efficiency as one of the criteria for site selection. The Auditor-General noted the Department and the Major Transport Infrastructure Authority had fully addressed seven of its recommendations, partially addressed one and was working to address two more, but warned that the project had not completed a business case for its second batch of crossing removals so the economic benefits were unclear.

=== Public ===
While the LXRP has been broadly popular, local opposition has attracted significant media attention. Elevated rail has been controversial among some local residents and businesses, with protests over the removal of crossings on the Upfield line calling for a rail trench to be used instead. At the same time, polling has found a majority of Victorians supported the use of elevated rail to remove level crossings. In other examples, such as the Caulfield to Dandenong elevated rail project, local media reported that many residents were supportive of the project's outcomes.

== List of crossing removals ==
=== Original 50 crossing removals: 2014–2022 ===
Prior to the 2014 state election, the then Labor opposition announced a plan to remove 50 level crossings by 2022, including 20 by 2018. Park Road, Cheltenham, Mascot Avenue, Bonbeach, and Lochiel Avenue, Edithvale were added to the original 50 level crossing removals after further community consultations. This pushed the number of level crossing removals to 53. These removals were completed on the Glen Waverley, Frankston, Sunbury, Belgrave, Lilydale, Upfield, Cranbourne, Pakenham, Hurstbridge, Werribee, Craigieburn, and Mernda lines by May 2022.

| Line(s) | Road | Nearest station | Solution | Date of completion |
|---|---|---|---|---|
| Glen Waverley | Burke Road | Gardiner | Rail under | January 2016 |
| Frankston | Centre Road | Bentleigh | Rail under | August 2016 |
| Frankston | McKinnon Road | McKinnon | Rail under | August 2016 |
| Frankston | North Road | Ormond | Rail under | August 2016 |
| Sunbury | Furlong Road | Ginifer | Rail under | November 2016 |
| Sunbury | Main Road | St Albans | Rail under | November 2016 |
| Belgrave | Mountain Highway | Bayswater | Hybrid | December 2016 |
| Belgrave | Scoresby Road | Bayswater | Rail under | December 2016 |
| Belgrave, Lilydale | Blackburn Road | Blackburn | Rail under | January 2017 |
| Belgrave, Lilydale | Heatherdale Road | Heatherdale | Rail under | January 2017 |
| Upfield | Camp Road | Gowrie | Rail under | December 2017 |
| Sunbury | Melton Highway | Watergardens | Road over | January 2018 |
| Cranbourne, Pakenham | Chandler Road | Noble Park | Rail over | February 2018 |
| Cranbourne, Pakenham | Corrigan Road | Noble Park | Rail over | February 2018 |
| Cranbourne, Pakenham | Heatherton Road | Noble Park | Rail over | February 2018 |
| Cranbourne, Pakenham | Centre Road | Clayton | Rail over | April 2018 |
| Cranbourne, Pakenham | Clayton Road | Clayton | Rail over | April 2018 |
| Hurstbridge | Grange Road | Alphington | Rail under | May 2018 |
| Hurstbridge | Lower Plenty Road | Rosanna | Rail over | May 2018 |
| Cranbourne, Pakenham | Grange Road | Carnegie | Rail over | June 2018 |
| Cranbourne, Pakenham | Koornang Road | Carnegie | Rail over | June 2018 |
| Cranbourne, Pakenham | Murrumbeena Road | Murrumbeena | Rail over | June 2018 |
| Cranbourne, Pakenham | Poath Road | Hughesdale | Rail over | June 2018 |
| Frankston | Skye/Overton Road | Kananook | Rail over | June 2018 |
| Cranbourne | Thompsons Road | Merinda Park | Road over | June 2018 |
| Werribee | Kororoit Creek Road | Seaholme | Rail over | July 2018 |
| Cranbourne | Abbotts Road | Dandenong | Rail over | September 2018 |
| Craigieburn | Buckley Street | Essendon | Road under | September 2018 |
| Frankston | Seaford Road | Seaford | Hybrid | September 2018 |
| Werribee | Aviation Road | Aircraft | Road over | September 2019 |
| Mernda | High Street | Reservoir | Rail over | December 2019 |
| Frankston | Eel Race Road | Carrum | Closed off | February 2020 |
| Frankston | Mascot Avenue | Bonbeach | Closed off | February 2020 |
| Frankston | Station Street | Carrum | Rail over | February 2020 |
| Glen Waverley | Toorak Road | Tooronga | Rail over | April 2020 |
| Frankston | Balcombe Road | Mentone | Rail under | July 2020 |
| Frankston | Charman Road | Cheltenham | Rail under | August 2020 |
| Frankston | Park Road | Cheltenham | Rail under | August 2020 |
| Upfield | Bell Street | Coburg | Rail over | December 2020 |
| Upfield | Moreland Road | Moreland | Rail over | December 2020 |
| Werribee | Werribee Street | Werribee | Rail over | January 2021 |
| Werribee | Cherry Street | Werribee | Closed off | March 2021 |
| Pakenham | South Gippsland Highway | Dandenong | Road over | August 2021 |
| Frankston | Bondi Road | Bonbeach | Rail under | November 2021 |
| Frankston | Edithvale Road | Edithvale | Rail under | November 2021 |
| Frankston | Lochiel Avenue | Edithvale | Closed off | November 2021 |
| Lilydale | Manchester Road | Mooroolbark | Rail over | November 2021 |
| Lilydale | Maroondah Highway | Lilydale | Rail over | November 2021 |
| Williamstown | Ferguson Street | North Williamstown | Rail under | December 2021 |
| Pakenham | Clyde Road | Berwick | Road under | February 2022 |
| Pakenham | Hallam Road | Hallam | Rail over | April 2022 |
| Mernda | Bell Street | Bell | Rail over | May 2022 |
| Craigieburn | Glenroy Road | Glenroy | Rail under | May 2022 |

=== Additional 25 crossing removals: 2022–2025 ===
During the lead up to the 2018 state election, an extra 25 level crossing removals were announced. These removals occurred on the Cranbourne, Pakenham, Upfield, Frankston, Mernda, Ballarat, Geelong, Sunbury, Belgrave, Lilydale, and Bairnsdale lines. These announcements led to the Cranbourne line becoming level crossing free, although several pedestrian-only crossings do remain. The number of level crossing removals increased to 75 by 2025, or 78 including the three crossings added to the original fifty.

| Line(s) | Road | Nearest station | Preferred solution | Date of Completion |
|---|---|---|---|---|
| Cranbourne | Evans Road | Merinda Park | Road over | October 2020 |
| Upfield | Munro Street | Coburg | Rail over | November 2020 |
| Upfield | Reynard Street | Coburg | Rail over | November 2020 |
| Pakenham | Cardinia Road | Cardinia Road | Road over | December 2020 |
| Frankston | Argyle Avenue | Chelsea | Rail under | November 2021 |
| Frankston | Chelsea Road | Chelsea | Closed off | November 2021 |
| Frankston | Swanpool Avenue | Chelsea | Closed off | November 2021 |
| Werribee | Old Geelong Road | Hoppers Crossing | Closed off | December 2021 |
| Cranbourne | Greens Road | Dandenong | Rail over | February 2022 |
| Mernda | Cramer Street | Preston | Rail over | May 2022 |
| Mernda | Murray Road | Preston | Rail over | May 2022 |
| Mernda | Oakover Road | Bell | Rail over | May 2022 |
| Ballarat, Geelong | Fitzgerald Road | Ardeer | Road over | July 2022 |
| Ballarat, Geelong | Robinsons Road | Deer Park | Road under | September 2022 |
| Sunbury | Gap Road | Sunbury | Road under | September 2022 |
| Ballarat, Geelong | Mt Derrimut Road | Deer Park | Rail over | April 2023 |
| Belgrave, Lilydale | Union Road | Surrey Hills | Rail under | May 2023 |
| Belgrave, Lilydale | Mont Albert Road | Mont Albert | Rail under | May 2023 |
| Frankston | Neerim Road | Glen Huntly | Rail under | June 2023 |
| Frankston | Glen Huntly Road | Glen Huntly | Rail under | July 2023 |
| Cranbourne | Camms Road | Cranbourne | Road over | November 2023 |
| Pakenham | Main Street | Pakenham | Rail over | June 2024 |
| Pakenham | McGregor Road | Pakenham | Rail over | June 2024 |
| Gippsland | Racecourse Road | Pakenham | Rail over | June 2024 |
| Cranbourne, Pakenham | Webster Street | Dandenong | Closed off | October 2025 (Note: Webster Street was closed to vehicle traffic at the level crossing in October 2025 with a new nearby road underpass completed in September 2026.) |

=== Additional 10 crossing removals: 2023–2025 ===
Boosting the number of removals, the Andrews Labor government announced in July 2021 an extra 10 level crossing removals and 4 closures. (Note: The government changed the value of level crossing removals and closures during this announcement. Previously, both level crossing removals and level crossing closures counted toward the total. These announcements marked a shift to only level crossing removals being counted, with closures not being included.) These removals occurred on the Pakenham, Frankston, Mernda, Sunbury, Belgrave, and Lilydale lines. With the completion of these crossing removals the Pakenham and Lilydale lines joined the Cranbourne line in having no road-rail level crossings for their entire length, with these announcements pushing the number of crossing removals to 85 by the end of 2025. (Note: Or 92 crossings including add-ons and closures.)

| Line(s) | Road | Nearest station | Preferred solution | Date of Completion |
|---|---|---|---|---|
| Pakenham | Webb Street | Narre Warren | Rail over | December 2023 |
| Lilydale | Cave Hill Road | Lilydale | Closed off | January 2024 |
| Belgrave | Bedford Road | Ringwood | Rail under | March 2024 |
| Pakenham | Brunt Road | Beaconsfield | Road over | April 2024 |
| Mernda | Keon Parade | Keon Park | Rail over | May 2024 |
| Pakenham | Station Street | Officer | Closed off | May 2024 |
| Lilydale | Dublin Road | Ringwood East | Rail under | June 2024 |
| Lilydale | Coolstore Road | Croydon | Rail over | July 2024 |
| Frankston | Warrigal Road | Parkdale | Rail over | August 2024 |
| Frankston | Parkers Road | Parkdale | Rail over | August 2024 |
| Pakenham | Station Street | Beaconsfield | Road over | March 2025 |
| Pakenham | Progress Street | Dandenong | Closed off | June 2025 |
| Sunbury | Calder Park Drive | Watergardens | Road over | July 2025 |
| Sunbury | Holden Road | Watergardens | Closed off | July 2025 |

=== Additional 25 crossing removals: 2025–2033 ===
Prior to the 2022 state election, the State Government announced an extra 25 level crossing removals by 2030. These removals will occur on the Upfield, Ballarat, Sunbury, Hurstbridge, Frankston, and Werribee/Williamstown lines. At the conclusion of these removals, the Frankston, Sunbury, and Werribee lines (with the exception of the Altona Loop) will have no road-rail level crossings for their entire length, joining the Cranbourne, Pakenham, and Lilydale lines. These series of announcements have pushed the number of crossing removals to 110 by 2030. (Note: Or 121 including add-ons and closures.)

In the 2026–2027 Victorian state budget, the government revised the completion date of the Highett and Wickham Road, Highett, and Latrobe Street, Mentone level crossing removals to 2032. The timeline was revised to reduce disruption to the Frankston line and minimise construction inefficiencies by aligning these works with the Suburban Rail Loop East delivery schedule. In late August 2026 these three level crossing removals were again delayed by one year to 2033 to prioritise road maintenance works. The revised timeline pushed the number of crossing removals to 110 by 2033. (Note: Or 121 including add-ons and closures.)

| Line(s) | Road | Nearest station | Preferred solution | Status | Date of Completion |
|---|---|---|---|---|---|
| Sunbury | Old Calder Highway | Diggers Rest | Road over | Completed | June 2025 |
| Frankston | Bear Street | Mordialloc | Closed off | Completed | August 2025 |
| Sunbury | Watsons Road | Diggers Rest | Road over | Completed | November 2025 |
| Werribee | Champion Road | Newport | Closed off | Completed | April 2026 |
| Ballarat | Hopkins Road | Caroline Springs | Road over | Completed | May 2026 |
| Frankston | McDonald Street | Mordialloc | Rail over | Completed | May 2026 |
| Frankston | Station Street | Mordialloc | Rail over | Completed | May 2026 |
| Ballarat | Ferris Road | Cobblebank | Road over | Completed | July 2026 |
| Ballarat | Coburns Road | Melton | Rail over | Completed | September 2026 |
| Ballarat | Exford Road | Melton | Rail over | Completed | September 2026 |
| Werribee | Maddox Road | Newport | Rail over | Completed | September 2026 |
| Werribee | Maidstone Street | Laverton (Note: Laverton station is the closest open station on the Werribee line express route to the Maidstone Street level crossing (since Galvin station was closed in 1985). The closest station geographically is Westona station located south of the level crossing on the Altona Loop.) | Road over | Under construction | 2027 |
| Hurstbridge | Ruthven Street | Macleod | Rail over | Under construction | 2027 |
| Frankston | Armstrongs Road | Seaford | Rail over | Planning | 2028 |
| Frankston | Station Street | Seaford | Rail over | Planning | 2028 |
| Werribee, Williamstown | Hudsons Road | Spotswood | Rail over | Planning | 2028 |
| Werribee, Williamstown | Anderson Street | Yarraville | Closed off | Planning | 2029 |
| Frankston | Groves Street | Aspendale | Rail under | Early planning | 2029 |
| Upfield | Albert Street | Brunswick | Rail over | Planning | 2030 |
| Upfield | Albion Street | Anstey | Rail over | Planning | 2030 |
| Upfield | Brunswick Road | Jewell | Rail over | Planning | 2030 |
| Upfield | Dawson Street | Jewell | Rail over | Planning | 2030 |
| Upfield | Hope Street | Anstey | Rail over | Planning | 2030 |
| Upfield | Union Street | Jewell | Rail over | Planning | 2030 |
| Upfield | Victoria Street | Brunswick | Rail over | Planning | 2030 |
| Upfield | Park Street | Jewell | Rail over | Planning | 2030 |
| Frankston | Highett Road | Highett | Rail over | Early planning | 2033 |
| Frankston | Latrobe Street | Mentone | Closed off | Early planning | 2033 |
| Frankston | Wickham Road | Highett | Rail over | Early planning | 2033 |

== New and rebuilt stations ==
There will be 51 railway stations rebuilt as part of the LXRP. Four stations are being added to the metropolitan network as part of suburban rail extensions delivered by the LXRP. Three of these stations, Hawkstowe, Middle Gorge, and Mernda were added as part of the Mernda rail extension, which extended the former South Morang line eight kilometres (5.0 mi) north to Mernda. The extension, announced by Labor at the 2014 state election, opened in 2018.

As part of the level crossing removals along the Pakenham line, a new station was added at East Pakenham along with a short rail extension. The LXRP also delivered a new infill station at Southland on the Frankston line. In one case, the nearby Mont Albert and Surrey Hills railway stations on the Belgrave and Lilydale lines were merged and replaced with a brand new Union station located between them. Jewell and Brunswick stations are planned to be merged and replaced with a station outside the RMIT Brunswick campus between Union and Dawson Streets, with Anstey station moved south towards Hope Street, adjacent to some of the Nightingale Village apartments.

| Line(s) | Station | Image | Status | Completion date |
|---|---|---|---|---|
| Glen Waverley | Gardiner | | Open | January 2016 |
| Frankston | McKinnon | | Open | August 2016 |
| Frankston | Bentleigh | | Open | August 2016 |
| Frankston | Ormond | | Open | August 2016 |
| Sunbury | Ginifer | | Open | November 2016 |
| Sunbury | St Albans | | Open | November 2016 |
| Belgrave | Bayswater | | Open | December 2016 |
| Belgrave, Lilydale | Heatherdale | | Open | February 2017 |
| Frankston | Southland (new) | | Open | November 2017 |
| Cranbourne, Pakenham | Noble Park | | Open | February 2018 |
| Cranbourne, Pakenham | Clayton | Elevated Clayton railway station | Open | April 2018 |
| Hurstbridge | Rosanna | | Open | May 2018 |
| Cranbourne, Pakenham | Carnegie | | Open | June 2018 |
| Frankston, Stony Point | Frankston | | Open | June 2018 |
| Cranbourne, Pakenham | Murrumbeena | | Open | June 2018 |
| Cranbourne, Pakenham | Hughesdale | | Open | August 2018 |
| Mernda | Hawkstowe (new) | | Open | August 2018 |
| Mernda | Mernda (new) | | Open | August 2018 |
| Mernda | Middle Gorge (new) | | Open | August 2018 |
| Mernda | Reservoir | | Open | December 2019 |
| Frankston | Carrum | | Open | February 2020 |
| Frankston | Mentone | | Open | July 2020 |
| Frankston | Cheltenham | | Open | August 2020 |
| Upfield | Coburg | | Open | December 2020 |
| Upfield | Moreland | | Open | December 2020 |
| Lilydale | Lilydale | | Open | November 2021 |
| Lilydale | Mooroolbark | | Open | November 2021 |
| Frankston | Bonbeach | | Open | November 2021 |
| Frankston | Chelsea | | Open | November 2021 |
| Frankston | Edithvale | | Open | November 2021 |
| Williamstown | North Williamstown | | Open | December 2021 |
| Cranbourne | Merinda Park | | Open | February 2022 |
| Pakenham | Hallam | | Open | May 2022 |
| Craigieburn | Glenroy | | Open | May 2022 |
| Mernda | Bell | Bell station | Open | September 2022 |
| Mernda | Preston | Preston station on the Mernda line | Open | September 2022 |
| Ballarat, Geelong | Deer Park | | Open | April 2023 |
| Hurstbridge | Greensborough | | Open | April 2023 |
| Hurstbridge | Montmorency | | Open | April 2023 |
| Belgrave, Lilydale | Union (new) | | Open | May 2023 |
| Frankston | Glen Huntly | | Open | July 2023 |
| Pakenham | Narre Warren | | Open | March 2024 |
| Pakenham | East Pakenham (new) | | Open | June 2024 |
| Pakenham | Pakenham | | Open | June 2024 |
| Mernda | Keon Park | | Open | June 2024 |
| Lilydale | Ringwood East | | Open | July 2024 |
| Frankston | Parkdale | | Open | August 2024 |
| Lilydale | Croydon | | Open | August 2024 |
| Frankston | Mordialloc | | Open | May 2026 |
| Ballarat | Melton | | Open | September 2026 |
| Frankston | Seaford | | Planning | 2028 |
| Werribee, Williamstown | Spotswood | | Planning | 2028 |
| Frankston | Aspendale | | Early planning | 2029 |
| Upfield | Anstey | | Planning | 2030 |
| Upfield | Brunswick | | Planning | 2030 |
| Upfield | Jewell | | Planning | 2030 |
| Frankston | Highett | | Early planning | 2033 |

== See also ==
- List of Victoria Government infrastructure plans, proposals and studies
