= Gardiner railway station =

Railway station in Melbourne, Australia

Gardiner
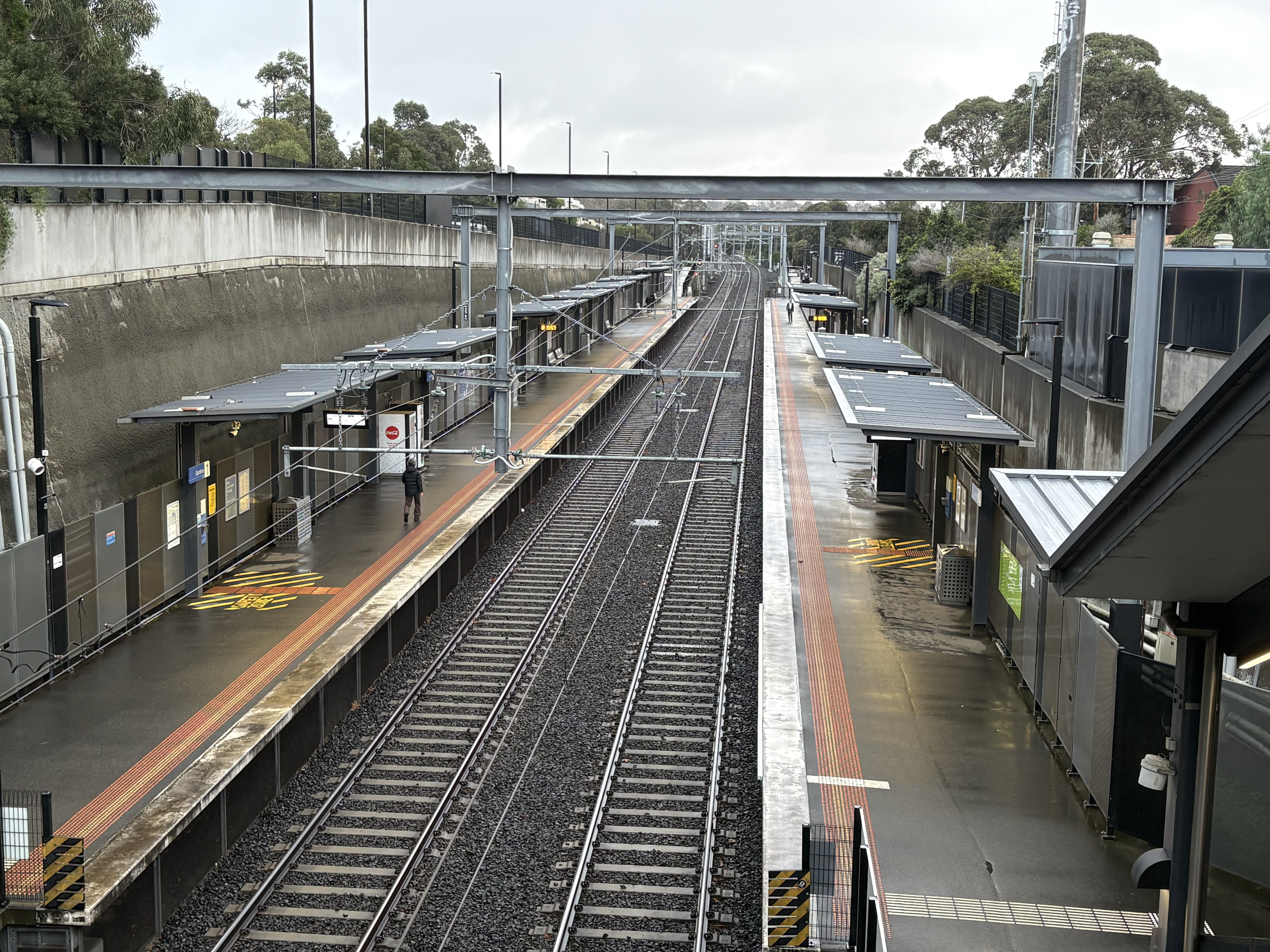
- Westbound view from the station concourse, June 2026

General information
- Location: Burke Road, Glen Iris, Victoria 3146; City of Stonnington; Australia
- Coordinates: 37°51′12″S 145°03′06″E
- System: PTV commuter rail station
- Owner: VicTrack
- Operator: Metro Trains
- Line: Glen Waverley
- Distance: 10.61 kilometres from Southern Cross
- Platforms: 2 side
- Tracks: 2
- Connections: Tram

Construction
- Structure type: Below-grade
- Parking: 220
- Cycle facilities: Yes (26 protected racks)
- Accessible: Yes—step free access

Other information
- Status: Operational, unstaffed
- Station code: GAR
- Fare zone: Myki zone 1
- Website: Public Transport Victoria

History
- Opened: 24 March 1890; 136 years ago
- Rebuilt: 18 January 2016 (LXRP)
- Electrified: December 1922 (1500 V DC overhead)

Passengers
- 2005–2006: 345,722
- 2006–2007: 385,616 ▲11.53%
- 2007–2008: 420,885 ▲9.15%
- 2008–2009: 435,255 ▲3.41%
- 2009–2010: 434,753 ▼0.12%
- 2010–2011: 468,432 ▲7.75%
- 2011–2012: 429,153 ▼8.39%
- 2012–2013: Not Measured
- 2013–2014: 425,133 ▼0.94%
- 2014–2015: 390,484 ▼8.15%
- 2015–2016: 277,916 ▼28.83%
- 2016–2017: 434,086 ▲56.19%
- 2017–2018: 480,877 ▲10.78%
- 2018–2019: 491,000 ▲2.11%
- 2019–2020: 389,800 ▼20.61%
- 2020–2021: 157,650 ▼59.56%
- 2021–2022: 198,550 ▲25.94%
- 2023–2024: 399,250 ▲49.73%
- 2024–2025: 399,400 ▲0.04%

Services
Preceding station	Metro Trains	Following station
Tooronga towards Flinders Street	Glen Waverley line	Glen Iris towards Glen Waverley
Track layout
Location

Gardiner station is a railway station operated by Metro Trains Melbourne on the Glen Waverley line, part of the Melbourne rail network. It serves Glen Iris, a suburb of Melbourne, Victoria, Australia. The station opened on 24 March 1890, named after pastoralist John Gardiner, who had settled near the junction of the Yarra River and Gardiners Creek in 1836.

The station consists of two side platforms accessed by a pedestrian concourse. There is one principal station building located on the concourse which serves as bike parking space and PSO facilities. This building is single story and opened in 2016 as part of a station rebuild. The station is fully accessible as there are DDA compliant lifts and access ramps provided.

The station connects to the route 72 tram service. The journey to Southern Cross railway station in central Melbourne is approximately 10.61 kilometres (6.59 mi) and takes 25 minutes.

== Description ==
Gardiner railway station located in the suburb of Glen Iris, a suburb of Melbourne, Victoria. North of the station is the Monash Freeway and Gardiner Park, and located south of the station is Burke Road shopping precinct. The station is owned by VicTrack, a state government agency, and the station is operated by Metro Trains. The station is 10.61 kilometres (6.59 mi), or a 25-minute train journey, from Southern Cross station. The adjacent stations are Tooronga station up towards Melbourne, and Glen Iris station down towards Glen Waverley.

The station consists of two side platforms two platform edges. As is standard in Melbourne, the platform has an asphalt surface with concrete on the edges. The platforms are approximately 160 metres (524 ft 11 in) long, sufficient for a Metro Trains 7-car High Capacity Metro Train. The station features a ground level concourse, accessible from the below ground platforms by stairs and lifts. There is one principal station building, opened in 2016, which contains PSO offices and bike storage facilities. The station building is made primarily from prefabricated steel, with 1700 pavers used in the station forecourt precinct. The building has a contemporary style, characterised by brightly coloured panels and sweeping roofs. The signal box, commissioned in 1917, was decommissioned and restored into public open space as part of level crossing removal works in 2016.

The station building, concourse, and platform are largely the same as when the station was rebuilt in 2016. There are 220 car and 26 protected bike parking spaces available at the station. The station is listed as fully accessible on the Metro Trains website, as there are lifts and accessible features available at the station.

== History ==
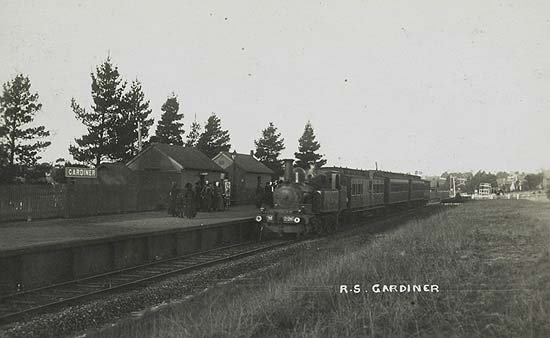
An M-class steam locomotive arriving at the original Gardiner Station, 1900

Gardiner railway station opened on 24 March 1890. The line through the station was originally built to link Burnley to the Outer Circle line at Waverley Road, before continuing onto Oakleigh. The station was named after local pastoralist John Gardiner, who had settled near the junction of the Yarra River and Gardiners Creek in 1836. The line to Darling was duplicated in 1926, alongside other works along the line.

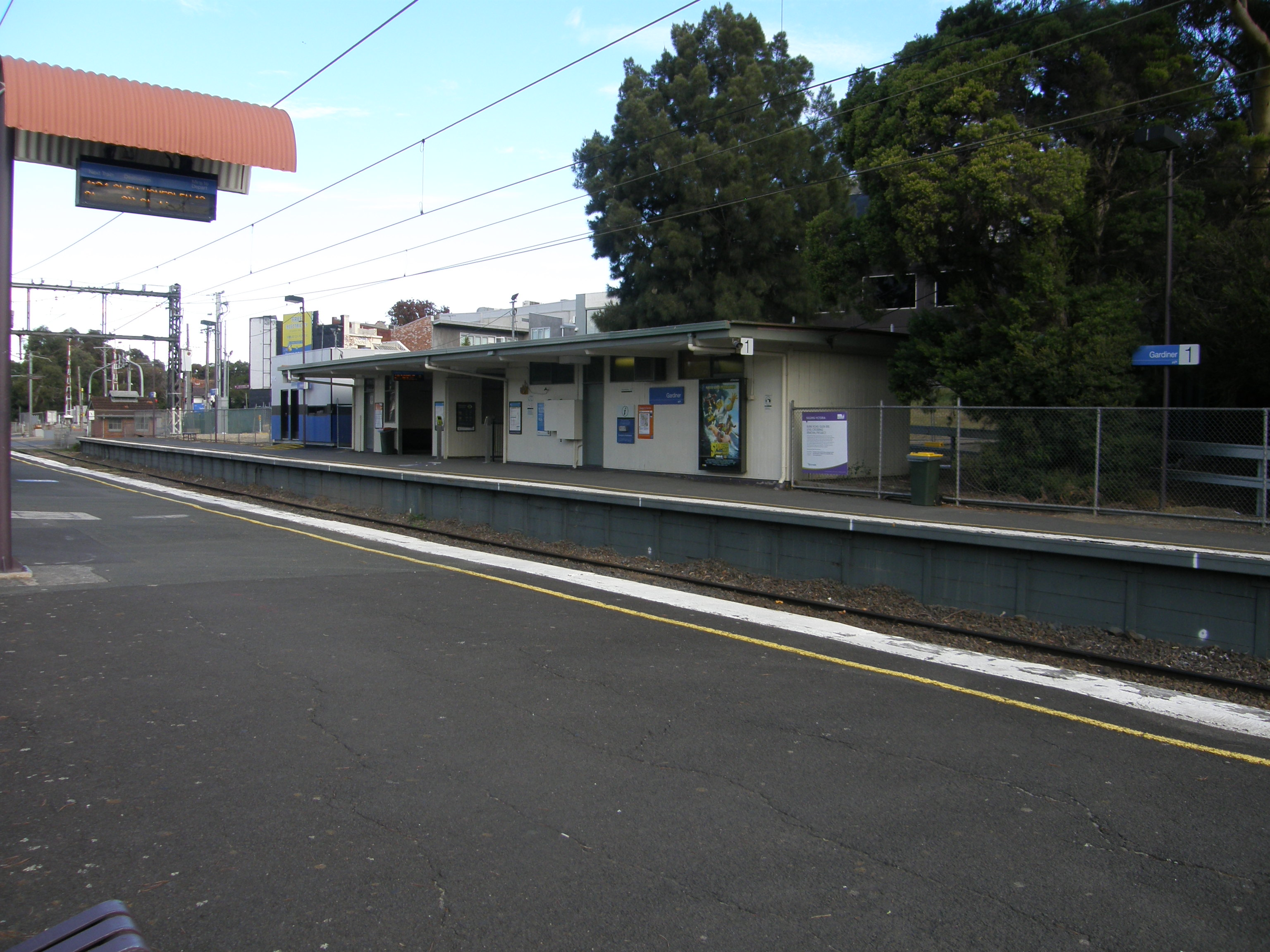
The former ground level Platforms, viewed from Platform 2, April 2015

The station was rebuilt in 1975 to coincide with the construction of the South Eastern Arterial link and other station rebuilds along the corridor at the time. This was the first station rebuild since its opening. However, it would not be the last, as the station was rebuilt in 2016 to coincide with level crossing removal works. In 1986, manually controlled boom barriers replaced interlocked gates at the former Burke Road level crossing, which was located at the down end of the station. Also at this time, level crossing safety upgrades occurred, with power operated pedestrian gates provided.

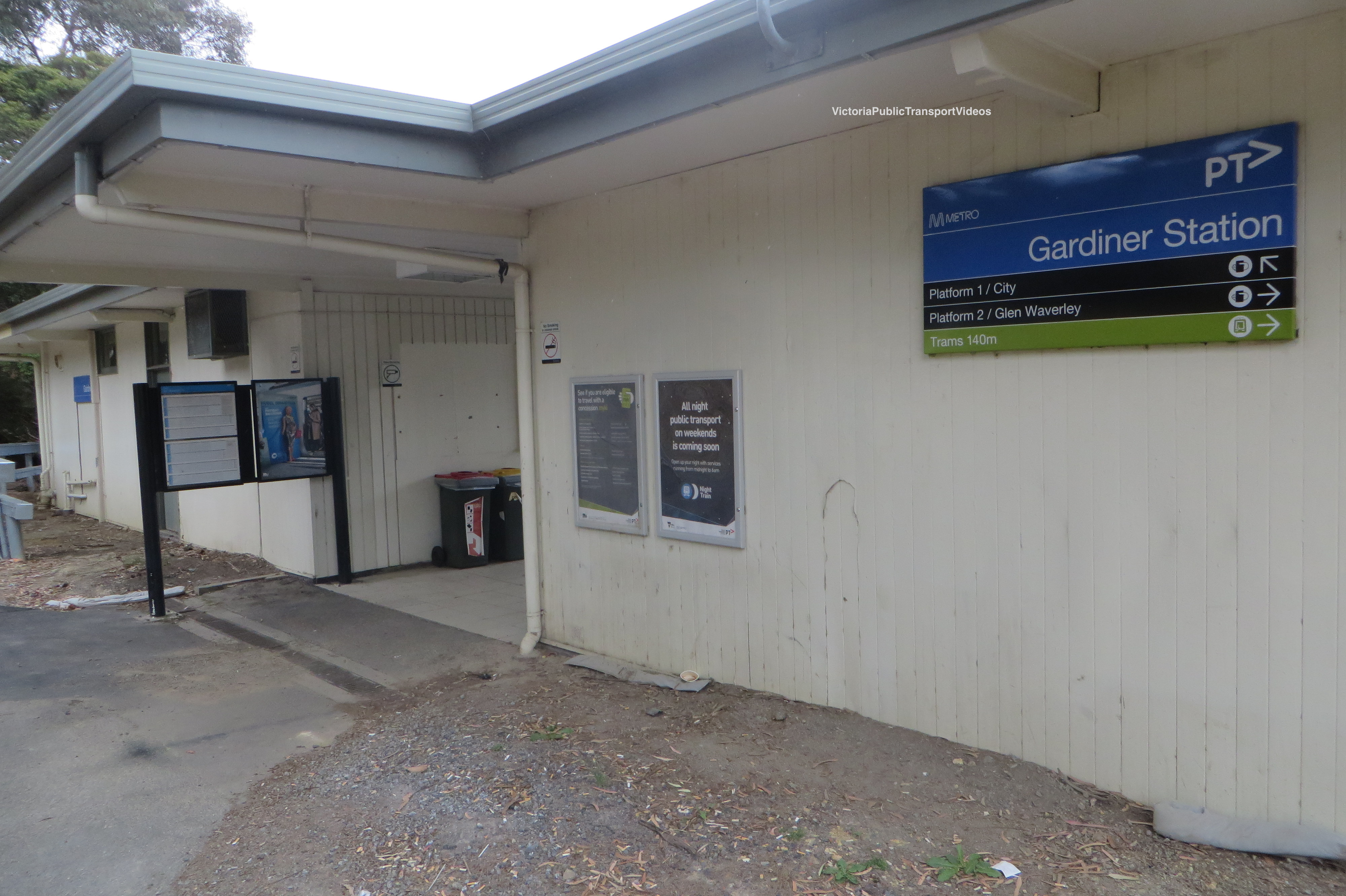
The former station building on Platform 1, April 2015

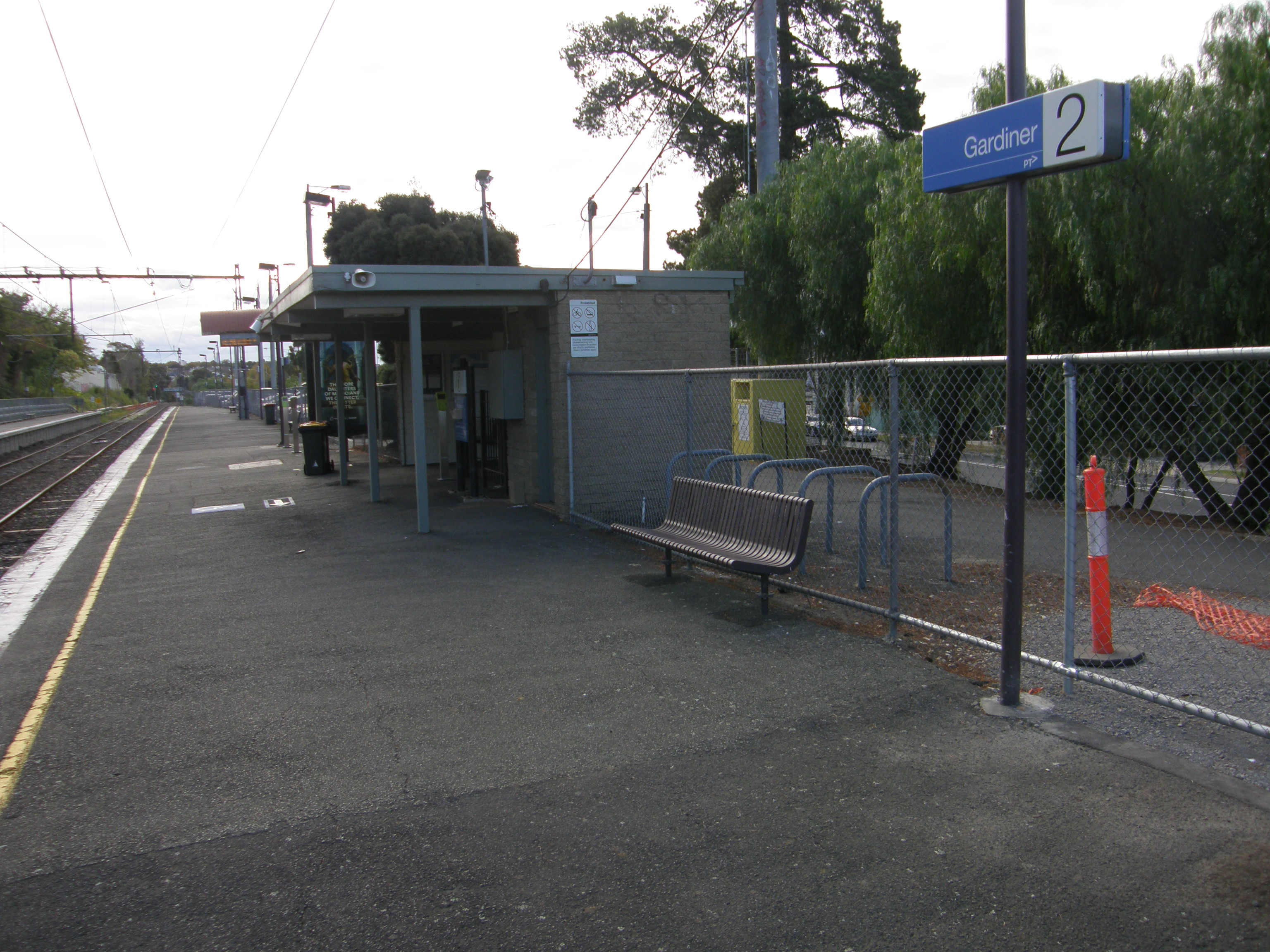
The former station building on Platform 2, April 2015

=== Level Crossing Removal Project ===
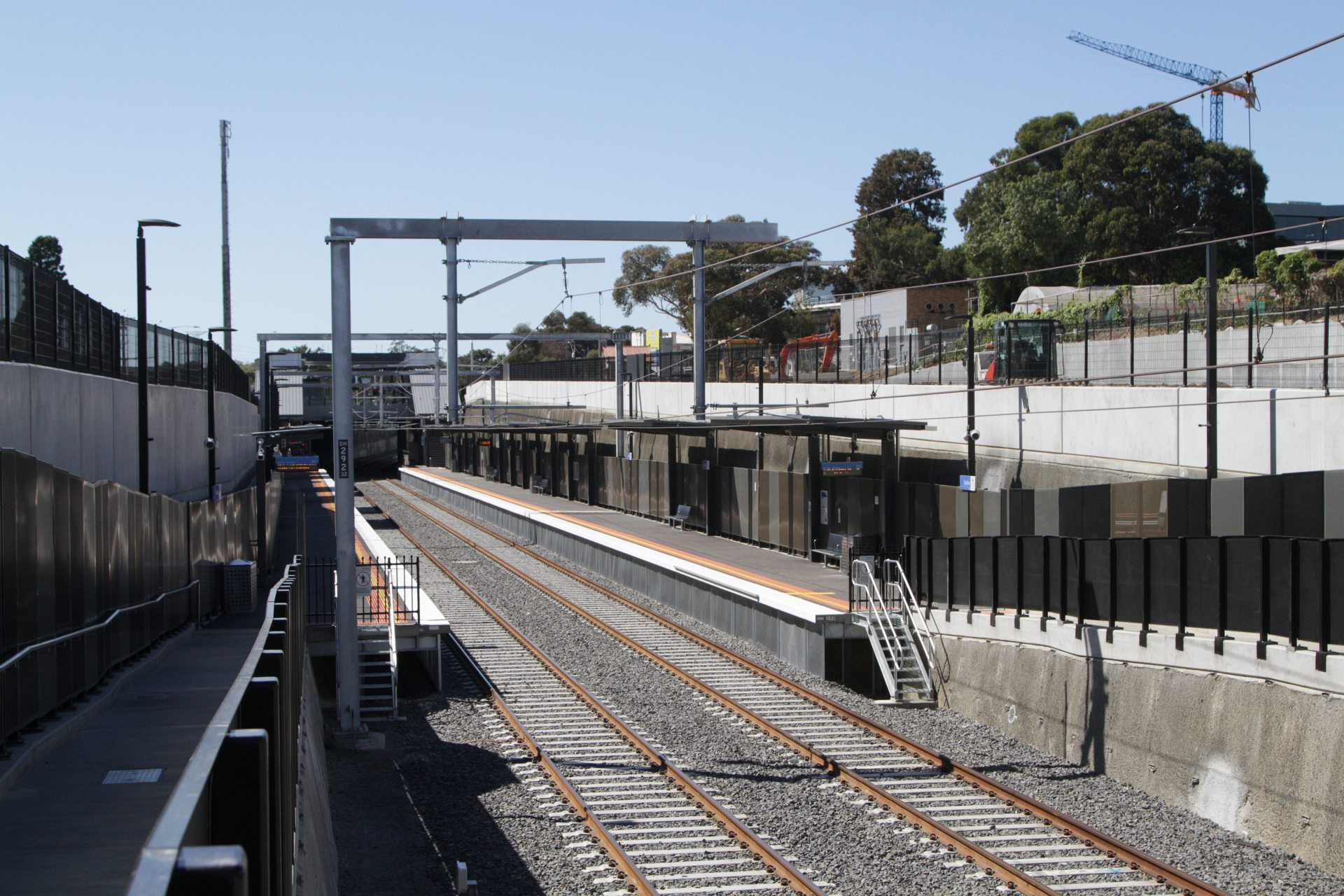
Eastbound view of the station platforms, February 2016

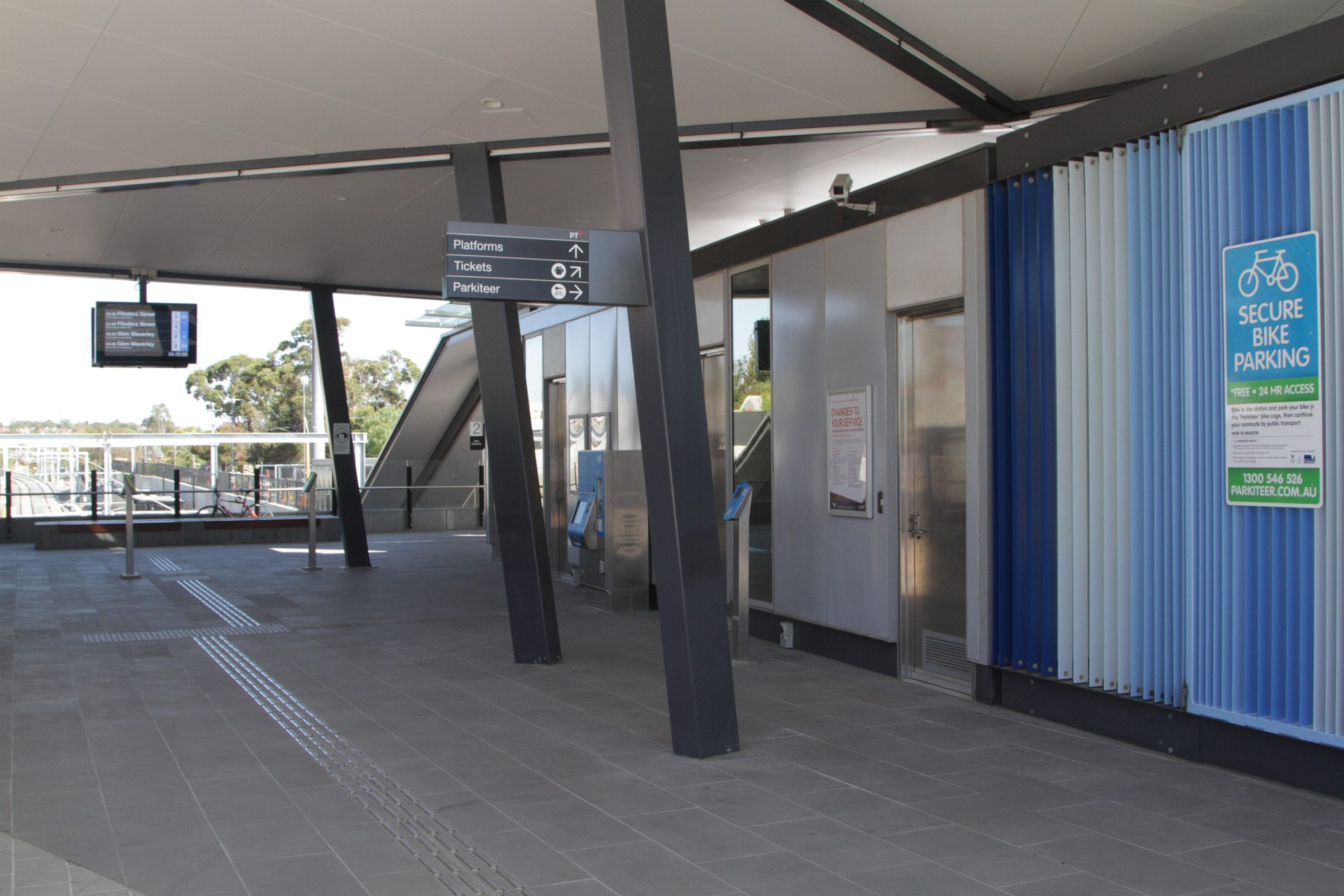
The rebuilt station concourse, February 2016

After numerous accidents at the Burke Road level crossing, the Liberal-National Napthine government announced that the crossing was to be grade-separated by mid-2017. This crossing was one of the last 4 remaining tram-train level crossings in Melbourne. These crossings are notorious for accidents and collisions, as trains and trams have to intersect at different electrical voltages. In 2011, Transport Minister Terry Mulder announced that the government began early planning works for the removal of the Burke Road level crossing, however, no commencement/conclusion date was released.

In May 2014, the government announced a $524 million package to remove three level crossings across Melbourne, to be delivered by VicRoads. The funding package included lowering the rail line underneath Burke Road, the redevelopment of Gardiner station north of its existing location, the construction of a tram super-stop, and the expansion of car parking facilities located south of their current location. The Napthine government lost the state election later that year; however, construction still went ahead under the subsequent Andrews government. This project was incorporated into the newly formed Level Crossing Removal Project in 2015.

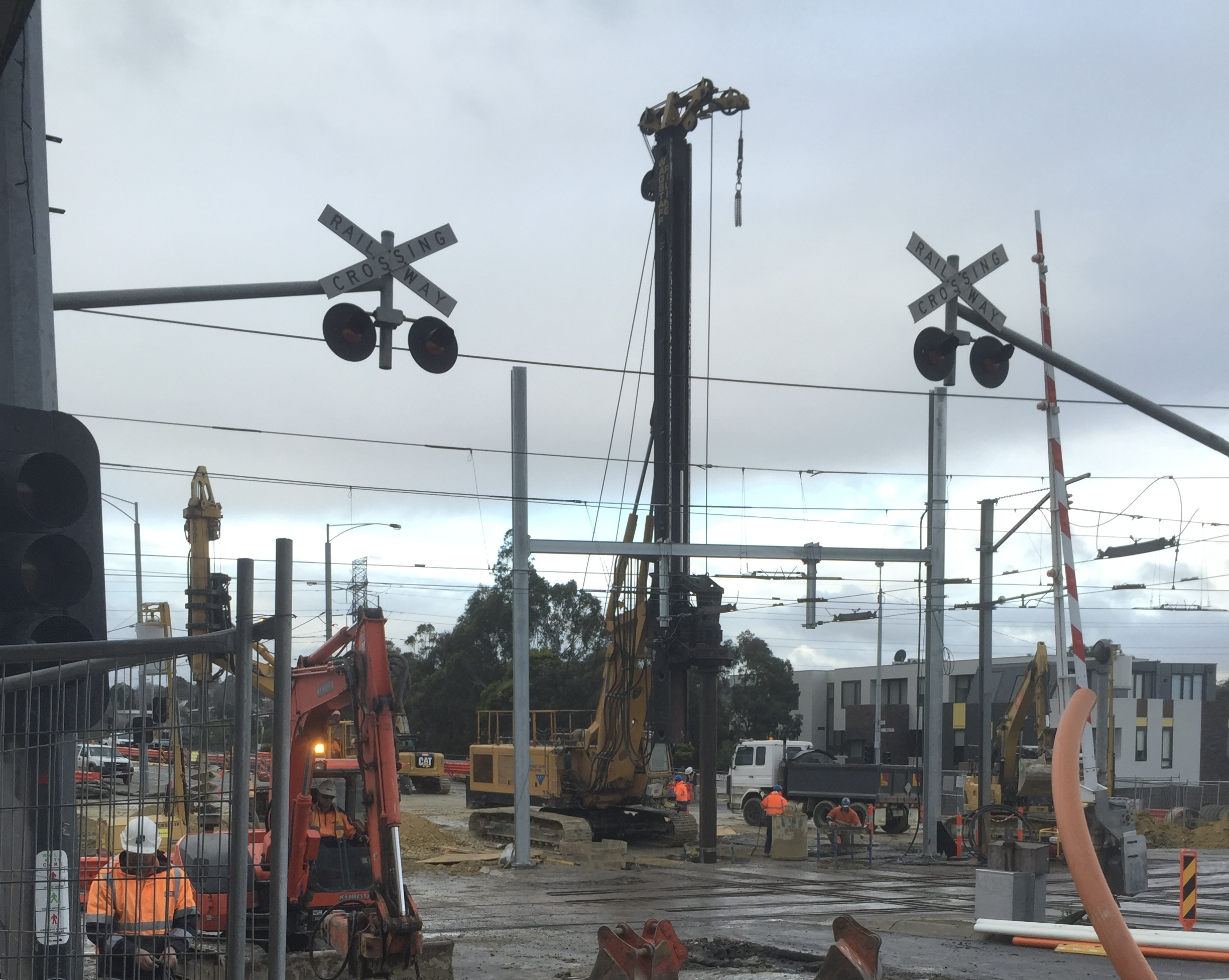
Pilling works during the August 2015 shutdown period (northbound)

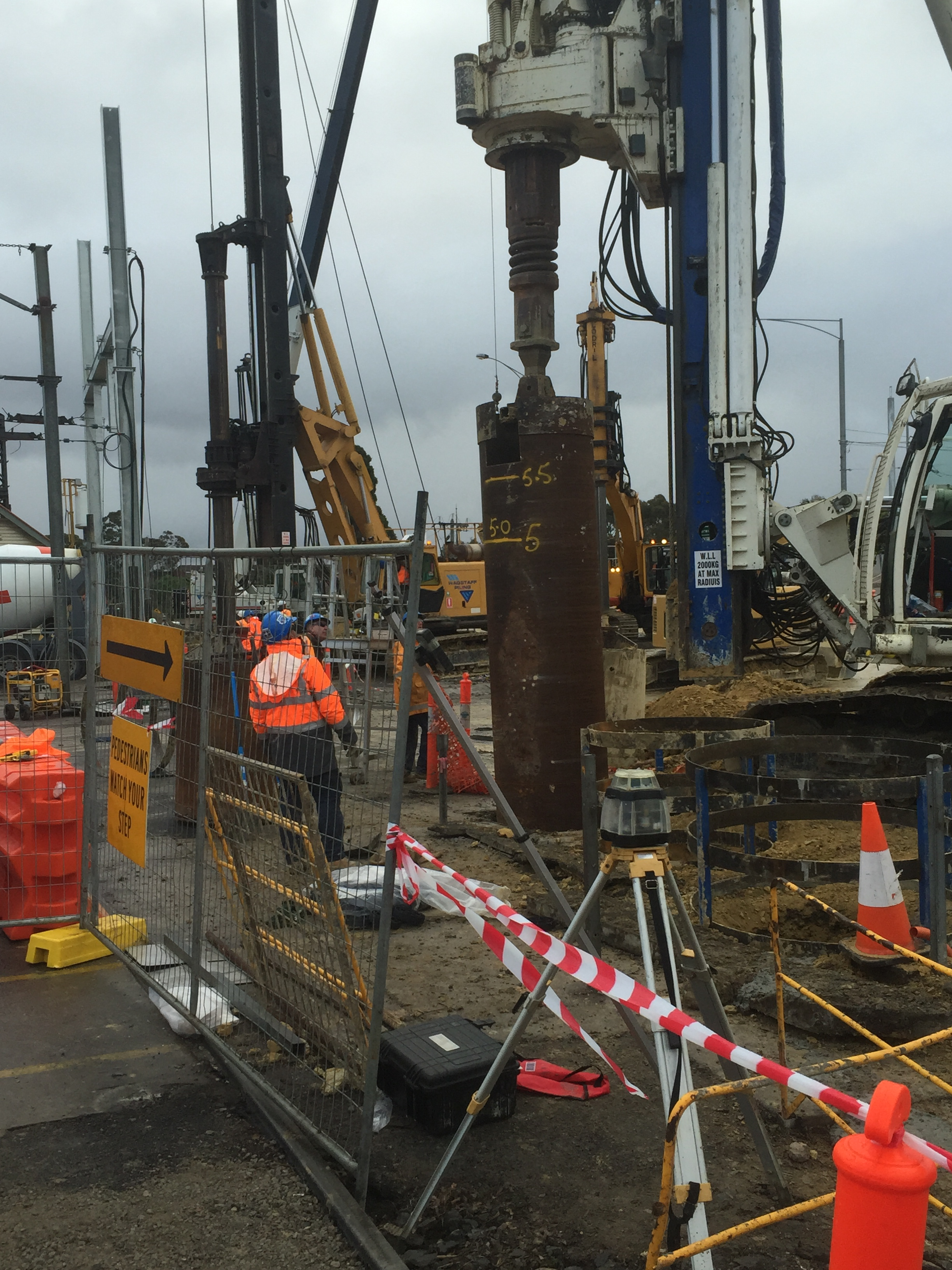
Pilling works during the August 2015 shutdown period (south-east)

During 2015, construction began on the project with piling works and service relocations to create the rail trench. Major construction ramped up with closures of the Glen Waverley line to facilitate further piling and excavation works. In September 2015, demolition of the original station occurred alongside the opening of a temporary station to continue to facilitate rail services. Once the temporary station opened, major excavation works were able to begin. Construction of the station also occurred during this time, with the prefabricated station buildings installed and platforms installed. With works continuing throughout the rest of 2015, the level crossing was removed in early 2016 with the reopening of Burke Road and Gardiner station. The station opened in a basic state, with elevators, paving, additional exits, and other facilities opening later in early 2016. In April 2016, came the completion of the newly resurfaced carpark, the new tram super-stop located 100 m (328 ft) north of the station, landscaping, and the rebuilt Gardiner Park—used by the project team as vehicle storage and site office facilities throughout the duration of the project. The redevelopment of Gardiner Park included the construction of a new clubhouse, the installation of a fake grass playing field, and a new playground.

As part of level crossing removal works, the Gardiner station signal box, located on Platform 2, was restored into public space after it was no longer needed to control the former road and tramway crossing. It was closed on 2 January 2016, 16 days before grade separation works concluding and the station reopened. Also built in conjunction with the removal works was an eleven storey high communication tower, aimed at improving identification of trains, and emergency management around the network. Gardiner station is one of 16 stations across the network to feature these installations.

== Platforms and services ==
Gardiner has two side platforms with two faces. The station is currently served by the Glen Waverley line—a service on the metropolitan rail network. The Glen Waverley line runs from Glen Waverley station south east of Melbourne, joining the Belgrave, Lilydale, and Alamein lines at Burnley station before travelling through the city loop.

Gardiner platform arrangement
Platform	Line	Destination	Service Type	Source
1	Glen Waverley line	Flinders Street	All stations and limited express services	
2	Glen Waverley line	Glen Waverley	All stations and limited express services	

== Transport links ==
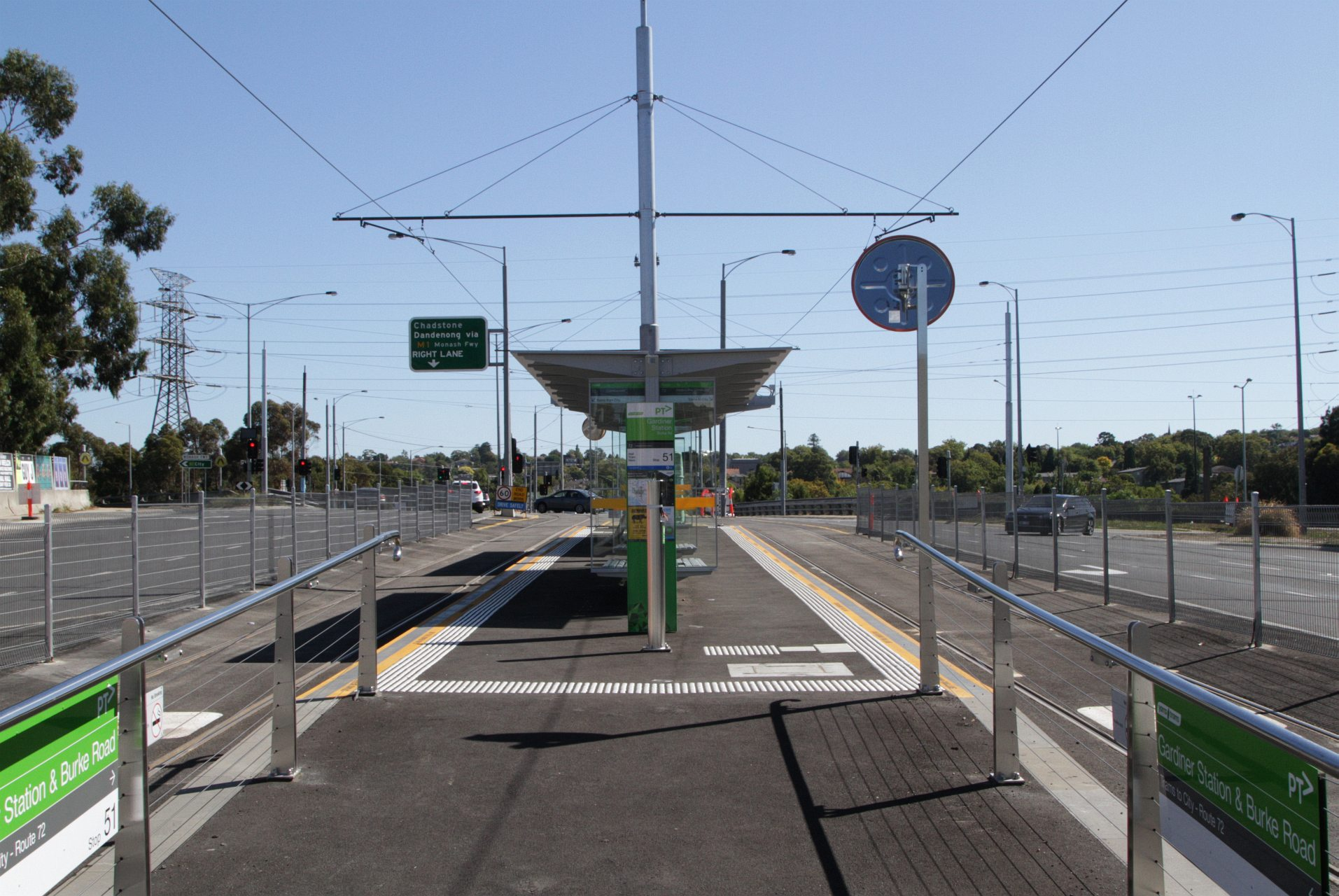
The Route 72 tram stop on Gardiner Road, connecting to Gardiner station, February 2016

Gardiner station has one tram connection with no bus connections. The route 72 tram service operates from nearby Burke Road up towards the city and down towards Camberwell. The station has an accessible platform tram stop located just north of the station, with electronic announcements and shelter facilities available on the island platform. Gardiner station also has train replacement bus stops located adjacent to the station.

Tram connections:

- : Melbourne University – Camberwell

== See also ==
- Level Crossing Removal Project
