= John Gardiner (pastoralist) =

British banker and Australian settler (1798–1878)

- Born: 5 July 1798; Dublin, Ireland
- Died: 16 November 1878 (aged 80); Royal Leamington Spa, Kent, England
- Occupation: Pastoralist
- Spouse(s): Mary Eagle, Sarah Fletcher
- Children: Anna Maria

John Gardiner (9 September 1798 – 16 November 1878) was a banker and pastoralist in the early part of British settlement of Melbourne and Australia. In 1836, he established a settlement near the junction of the Yarra River and Kooyongkoot Creek, which was later renamed after him.

== Legacy ==
Several features of Melbourne have been named after John Gardiner, including:

- Gardiner's Creek A waterway in the eastern suburbs of Melbourne, and part of the Yarra River catchment. In Gardiner's time, the creek was known as Kooyongkoot.
- John Gardiner Reserve A park in Booroondara, the site of a former quarry
- John Gardiner Secondary College a secondary school, now closed. Auburn High School now occupies the site.
- Gardiner Road A road in Booroondara
- John Gardiner Rover Crew A Rover Scout Unit located in Ferndale Park, Glen Iris
- Gardiner Railway Station a railway station on the Glen Waverley line
