= Huntingdale railway station =

Railway station in Melbourne, Australia

Huntingdale
- Eastbound view from Platform 2, September 2026

General information
- Location: Haughton Road, Oakleigh, Victoria 3166; City of Monash; Australia
- Coordinates: 37°54′40″S 145°06′09″E
- System: PTV commuter rail station
- Owner: VicTrack
- Operator: Metro Trains
- Lines: Cranbourne; Pakenham
- Distance: 18.28 kilometres from Southern Cross
- Platforms: 2 (1 island)
- Tracks: 2
- Connections: Bus

Construction
- Structure type: At-grade
- Parking: 850 spaces
- Cycle facilities: 50 racks
- Accessible: No—steep ramp

Other information
- Status: Operational, host station
- Station code: HUN
- Fare zone: Myki zone 1/2
- Website: Public Transport Victoria

History
- Opened: 25 June 1927; 99 years ago
- Rebuilt: 1970
- Electrified: December 1922 (1500 V DC overhead)
- Former names: Eastoakleigh (1927–1954)

Passengers
- 2005–2006: 1,117,215
- 2006–2007: 1,285,843 ▲15.09%
- 2007–2008: 1,489,111 ▲15.8%
- 2008–2009: 1,562,325 ▲4.91%
- 2009–2010: 1,501,842 ▼3.87%
- 2010–2011: 1,427,573 ▼4.94%
- 2011–2012: 1,336,829 ▼6.35%
- 2012–2013: Not measured
- 2013–2014: 1,668,137 ▲24.78%
- 2014–2015: 1,632,856 ▼2.11%
- 2015–2016: 1,780,723 ▲9.05%
- 2016–2017: 1,674,674 ▼5.95%
- 2017–2018: 1,413,112 ▼15.61%
- 2018–2019: 1,592,921 ▲12.72%
- 2019–2020: 1,151,750 ▼27.69%
- 2020–2021: 556,100 ▼51.71%
- 2021–2022: 666,850 ▲19.91%
- 2022–2023: 1,118,000 ▲67.65%
- 2023–2024: 1,391,450 ▲24.56%
- 2024–2025: 1,590,050 ▲14.27%

Services
Preceding station	Metro Trains	Following station
Oakleigh towards Watergardens or Sunbury via Metro Tunnel	Cranbourne line	Clayton towards Cranbourne or East Pakenham
Oakleigh towards Watergardens or Sunbury via Metro Tunnel	Pakenham line	Clayton towards Cranbourne or East Pakenham
Track layout
Location

Huntingdale station is a railway station operated by Metro Trains Melbourne on the Pakenham and Cranbourne lines, both part of the Melbourne rail network. It serves the suburbs of Oakleigh and Huntingdale located in the south-east of Melbourne, Victoria in Australia. The station originally opened in 1927 as "Eastoakleigh", was renamed Huntingdale in 1954. Huntingdale is a ground-level host station, consisting of a single island platform connected to both Railway Avenue and Haughton Road via a pedestrian subway.

The station is served by five bus routes, including the 601 university shuttle and SmartBus route 900. The station is approximately 17 kilometres (11 mi) or around a 30-minute train ride away from Flinders Street.

== Description ==
Huntingdale station consists of a single island platform connected to both Railway Avenue and Haughton Road via a pedestrian subway. The length of the platform is approximately 160 metres (520 ft), long enough for a 7-car HCMT. The single station building primarily serves as a waiting room.

The main car park at the station is located on Railway Avenue just north-east of the station. Although there are ramps they do not fully comply with the Disability Discrimination Act of 1992 as the gradient of the ramps is steeper than the maximum of 1:14 allowed under the Act.

== History ==
Huntingdale station opened on 25 June 1927. As with the suburb itself, it gets its name from the Melbourne Hunt Club, which occupied parts of the suburb (then known as Oakleigh East) from 1887 to 1929. The land that was occupied by the Hunt Club was later acquired by the Eastern Golf Club which subsequently became the Huntingdale Golf Club in 1940. In 1954, the station was renamed Huntingdale when that became the accepted named for the former suburb of East Oakleigh.

In 1970, the signal box and interlocked gates at the station were removed, as part of the grade separation of the North Road level crossing. During this time a temporary level crossing was provided with boom barriers whilst construction was undertaken and, in that year, the current station building and underpass were provided. In 1971, the island platform was extended at the south-eastern end.

In March 2011, there was a significant amount of garbage dumped at the station car park. Metro Trains Melbourne cleaned 60 cubic metres (2,100 cu ft) of rubbish on 18 March 2011, at a cost of around $7,000. An August 2011 survey of passengers rated Huntingdale among the worst stations in Melbourne because of rubbish and graffiti at the station, unsafe access, and flooding of the subway.

In 2013, Monash University, Clayton campus lobbied for improvements to the station and the bus interchange. Stops for connecting bus services not close to the station, and had no lighting or shelters. The condition of the station and bus interchange was a serious concern because Huntingdale was a major gateway to the university, particularly via bus route 601. In 2015 the decision to construct a $5 million bus interchange was announced by the Andrews Government which was expected address these concerns.

In 2018, the station received a $11.6 million upgrade to create a transport hub. The main project was the construction of a new bus interchange at a cost of $5 million. The car park was also upgraded, with additional parking installed. In 2015, the project was said to cost $7.6 million which is about $4 million less than the project's final cost.

Commencing 31st August 2026, the station has started to receive updated signage along the platform and underpass to align with modern Transport Victoria branding.

== Platforms and services ==
The station is currently served by Pakenham and Cranbourne line trains. Services to East Pakenham and Cranbourne travel together south-east towards Dandenong before splitting into two separate lines. Services to the city run express from Malvern to Anzac before continuing towards Sunbury via the Metro Tunnel.

Huntingdale platform arrangement
Platform	Line	Destination	Via	Service Type	Notes	Source
1	Cranbourne line Pakenham line	West Footscray, Watergardens or Sunbury	Town Hall	Limited express	Services to West Footscray only operate during weekday peaks.	
2	Cranbourne line Pakenham line	Westall, Dandenong, East Pakenham or Cranbourne		All stations	Services to Westall and Dandenong only operate during weekday peaks.	

== Transport links ==
Four bus routes operate via Huntingdale station, all departing from the bus interchange just north of the station on Haughton Road.

Bus connections
CDC Melbourne operates three bus routes via Huntingdale station, under contract to Transport Victoria:

- 601 : to Monash University (Clayton)
- 630 : Elwood – Monash University (Clayton)
- SmartBus 900 : Caulfield station – Stud Park Shopping Centre (Rowville) (shared with Ventura)

Ventura Bus Lines operates two bus routes via Huntingdale station, under contract to Transport Victoria:

- 704 : Westall station – Oakleigh station
- SmartBus 900 : Caulfield station – Stud Park Shopping Centre (Rowville) (shared with CDC Melbourne)
