= Hughesdale railway station =

Railway station in Melbourne, Australia

Hughesdale
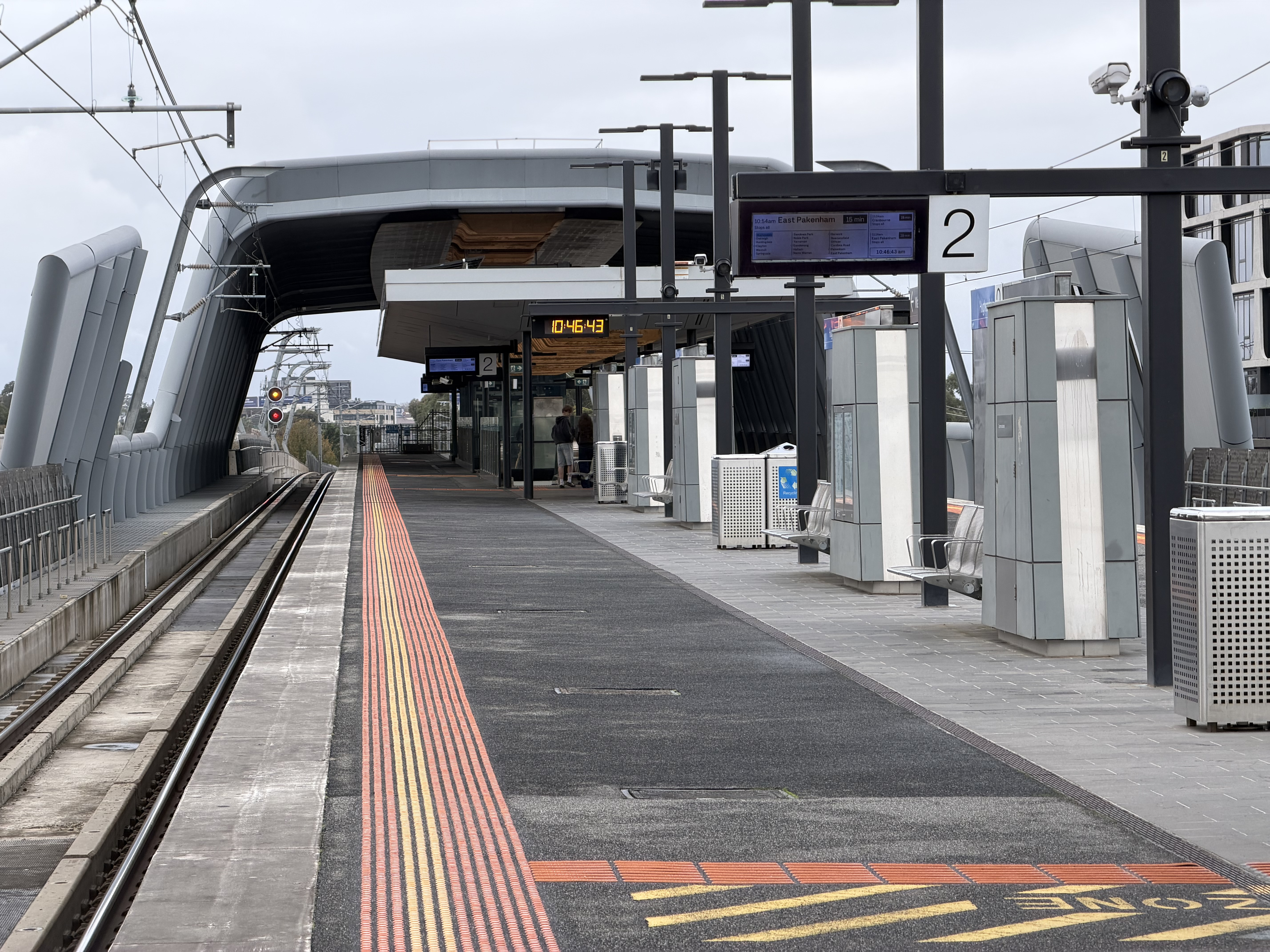
- South-east bound view from Platform 2, June 2026

General information
- Location: Railway Parade, Murrumbeena, Victoria 3163; City of Glen Eira; Australia
- Coordinates: 37°53′39″S 145°04′35″E
- System: PTV commuter rail station
- Owner: VicTrack
- Operator: Metro Trains
- Lines: Cranbourne; Pakenham
- Distance: 15.48 kilometres from Southern Cross
- Platforms: 2 (1 island)
- Tracks: 2
- Connections: Bus

Construction
- Structure type: Elevated
- Parking: 70 spaces
- Cycle facilities: Yes
- Accessible: Yes—step free access

Other information
- Status: Operational, host station
- Station code: HUG
- Fare zone: Myki zone 1/2
- Website: Public Transport Victoria

History
- Opened: 28 February 1925; 101 years ago
- Closed: 14 October 2017
- Rebuilt: 25 August 2018 (LXRP)
- Electrified: March 1922 (1500 V DC overhead)

Passengers
- 2005–2006: 364,345
- 2006–2007: 399,868 ▲9.74%
- 2007–2008: 425,103 ▲6.31%
- 2008–2009: 484,983 ▲14.08%
- 2009–2010: 507,540 ▲4.65%
- 2010–2011: 546,381 ▲7.65%
- 2011–2012: 517,103 ▼5.35%
- 2012–2013: Not measured
- 2013–2014: 545,339 ▲5.46%
- 2014–2015: 545,528 ▲0.03%
- 2015–2016: 609,345 ▲11.69%
- 2016–2017: 678,900 ▲11.41%
- 2017–2018: 231,413 ▼65.91%
- 2018–2019: 443,909 ▲91.82%
- 2019–2020: 501,050 ▲12.87%
- 2020–2021: 250,500 ▼50%
- 2021–2022: 276,350 ▲10.31%
- 2022–2023: 444,600 ▲60.88%
- 2023–2024: 548,700 ▲23.41%
- 2024–2025: 555,350 ▲1.21%

Services
Preceding station	Metro Trains	Following station
Murrumbeena towards Watergardens or Sunbury via Metro Tunnel	Pakenham line	Oakleigh towards Cranbourne or East Pakenham
Murrumbeena towards Watergardens or Sunbury via Metro Tunnel	Cranbourne line	Oakleigh towards Cranbourne or East Pakenham
Track layout
Location

Hughesdale station is a railway station operated by Metro Trains Melbourne on the Pakenham and Cranbourne lines, both part of the Melbourne rail network. It serves the south-eastern suburb of Murrumbeena, in Melbourne, Victoria, Australia. It opened on 28 February 1925, with the current station provided in August 2018.

== History ==
Like the adjoining suburb, Hughesdale station was named in honour of James Vincent Hughes, mayor of Oakleigh from 1924 to 1925. He, with the Poath Road Railway Station League, had lobbied strongly for a new station for the area. Before the station was built, Hughesdale was the site of the junctions of both the Outer Circle and Rosstown lines with the Dandenong/Gippsland line.

In 1972, boom barriers replaced hand gates at the former Poath Road level crossing, which was at the up end of the former ground-level station.

In 1977, the former ground-level station building was rebuilt, after the original station building, which was of a timber construction, was destroyed by fire in 1975.

In 2016, the Level Crossing Removal Authority announced a grade separation project to eliminate the Poath Road level crossing immediately to the west of the station. On 14 October 2017, the station was closed, and was demolished on 28 October of that year. On 25 August 2018, the rebuilt station opened about 250 metres (820 ft) west of the former station, as part of construction of the new section of elevated rail line between Caulfield and Oakleigh. Consequently, the station is now located in the suburb of Murrumbeena rather than Hughesdale.

== Platforms and services ==
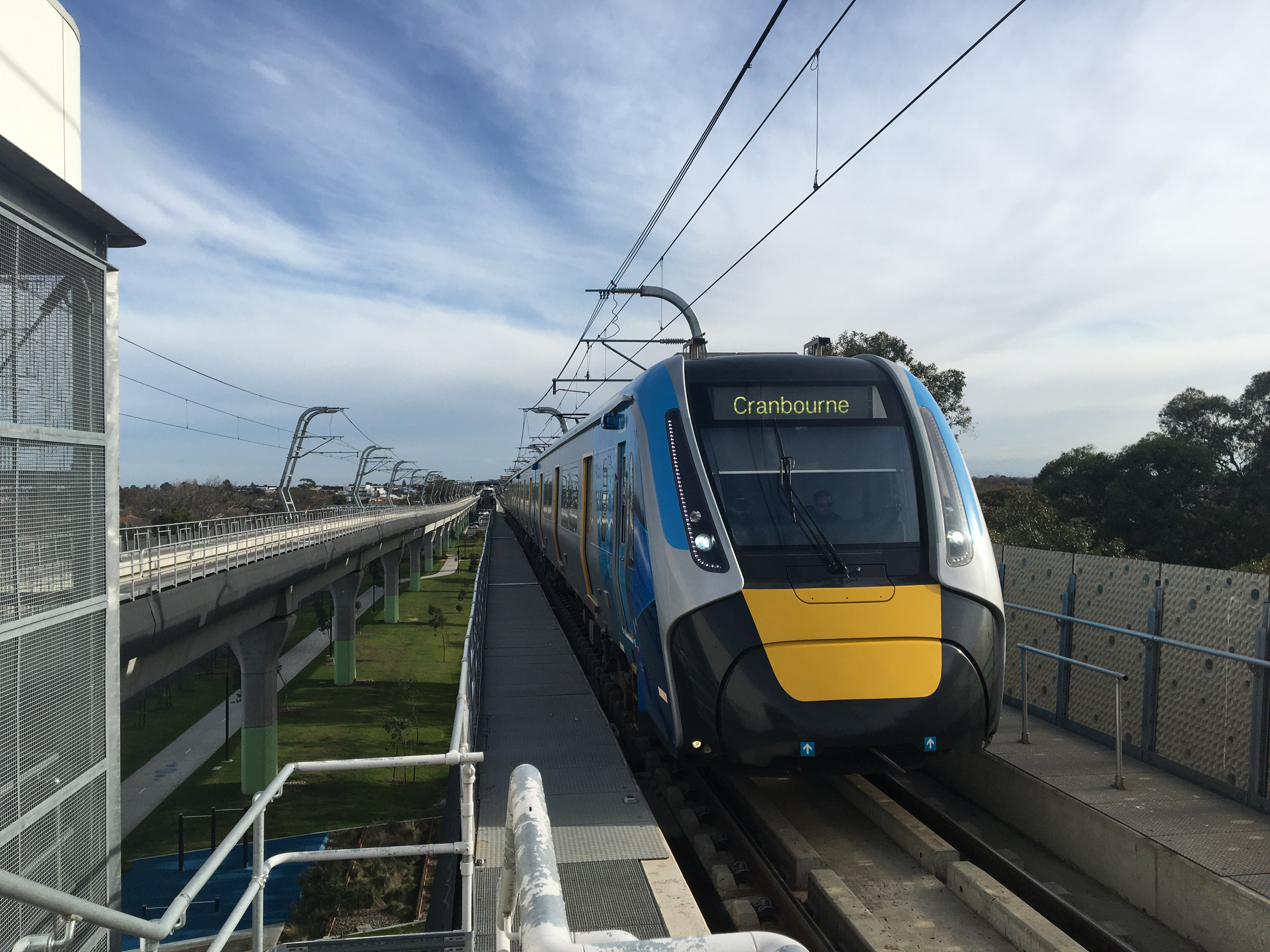
A High Capacity Metro Train on a Cranbourne-bound service arrives at Platform 2, July 2022

Hughesdale has one island platform with two faces and is served by Pakenham and Cranbourne line trains.

Hughesdale platform arrangement
Platform	Line	Destination	Via	Service Type	Source
1	Cranbourne line Pakenham line	Sunbury, Watergardens or West Footscray	Town Hall	Limited express	
2	Cranbourne line Pakenham line	East Pakenham, Cranbourne or Westall, Dandenong		All stations	

== Transport links ==
Ventura Bus Lines operates one route via Hughesdale station, under contract to Public Transport Victoria:

- 767 : Westfield Southland – Box Hill station

== Gallery ==
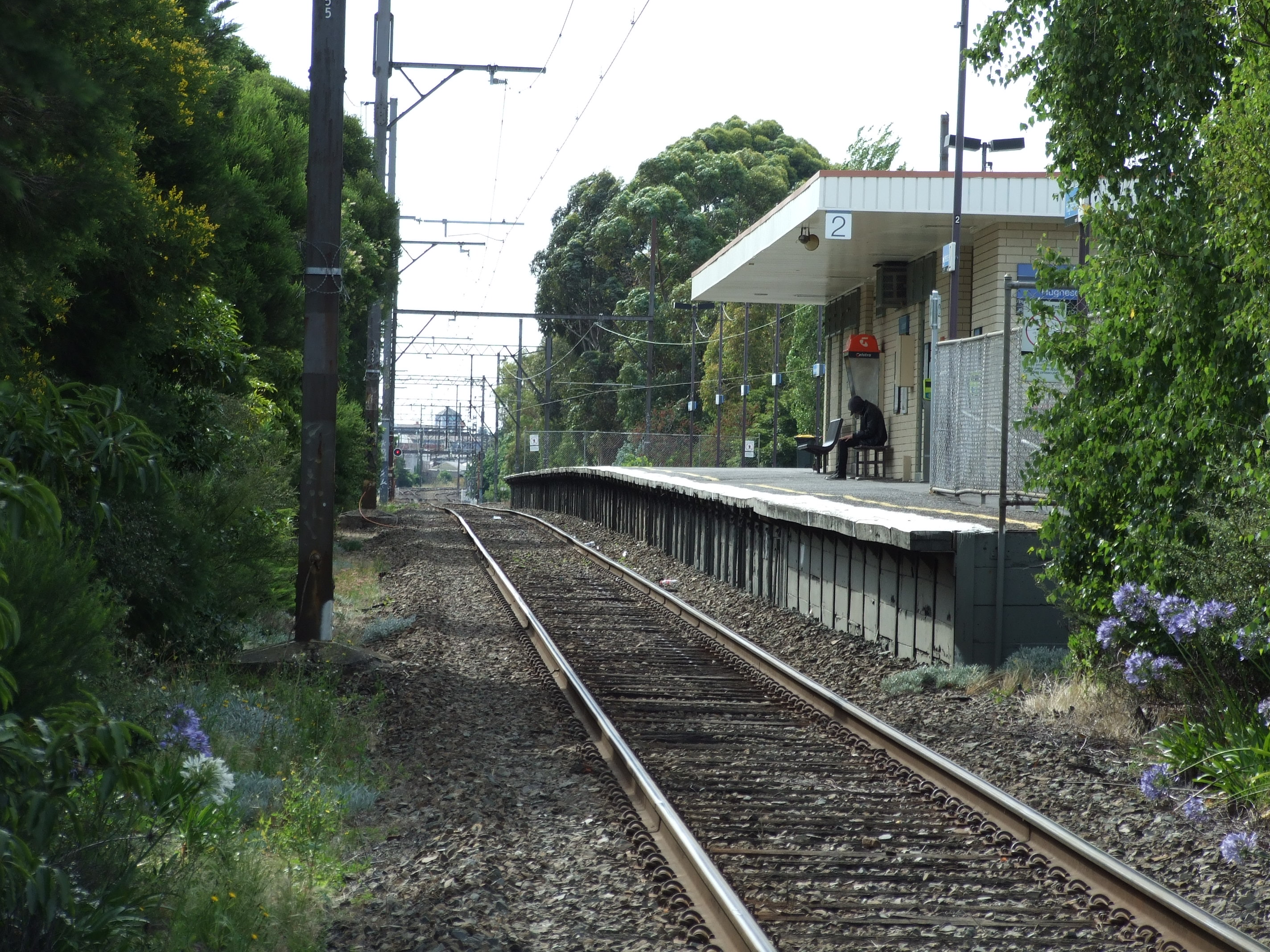
Southbound view of the former ground level Platform 2 and station building, December 2012

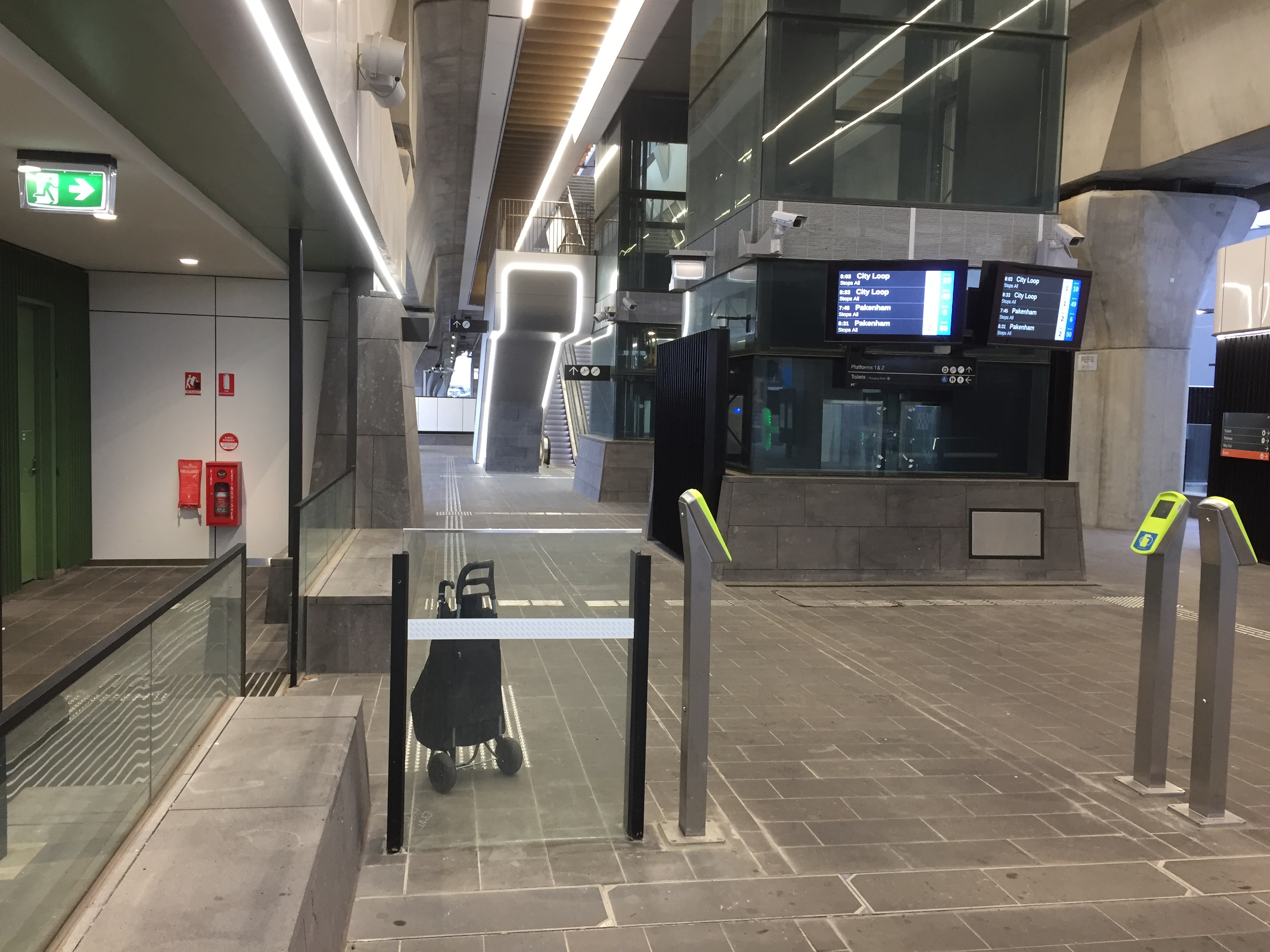
Station concourse and entrance, April 2019

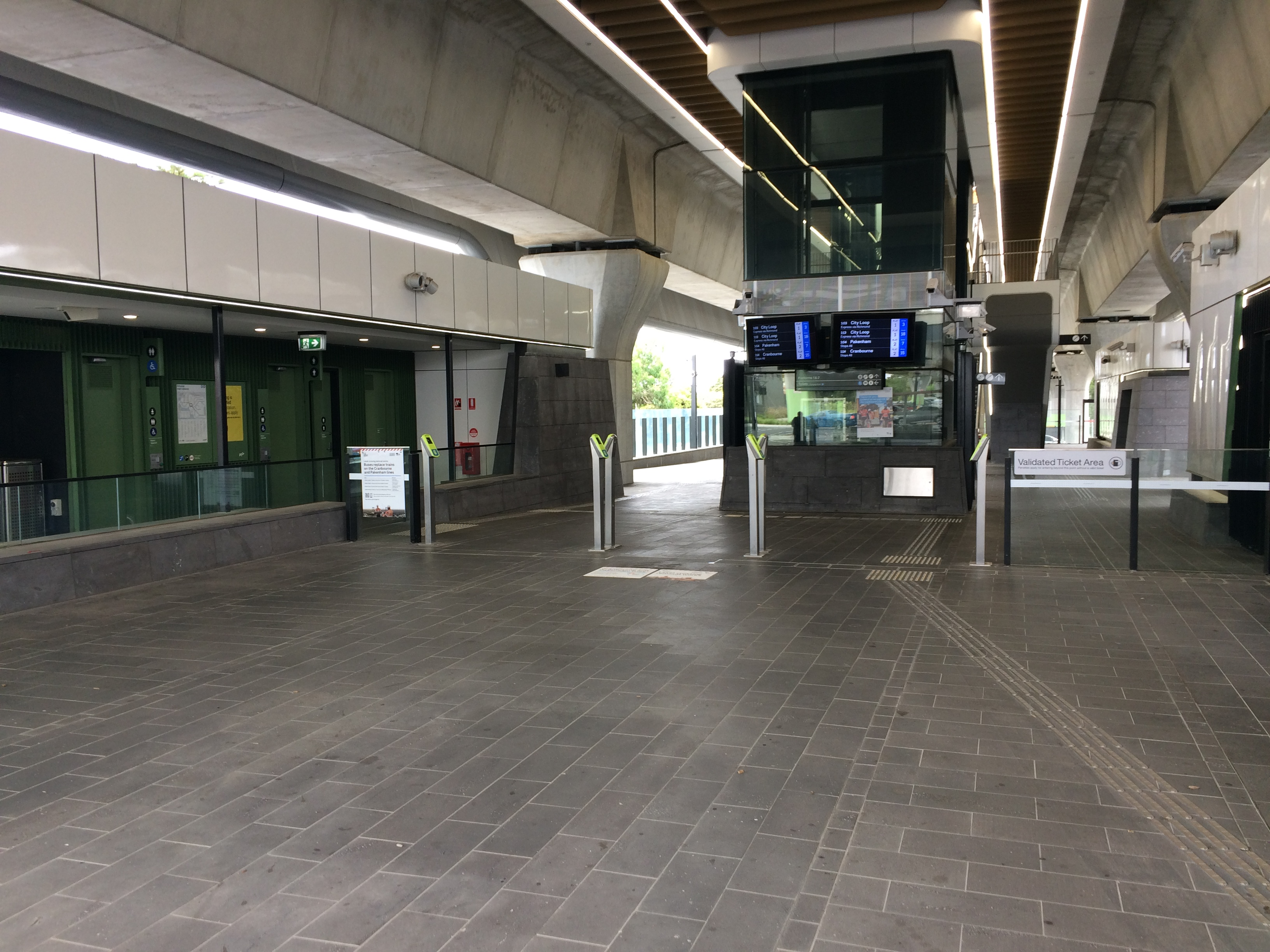
Station concourse and entrance, January 2021
