= Murrumbeena railway station =

Railway station in Melbourne, Australia

Murrumbeena
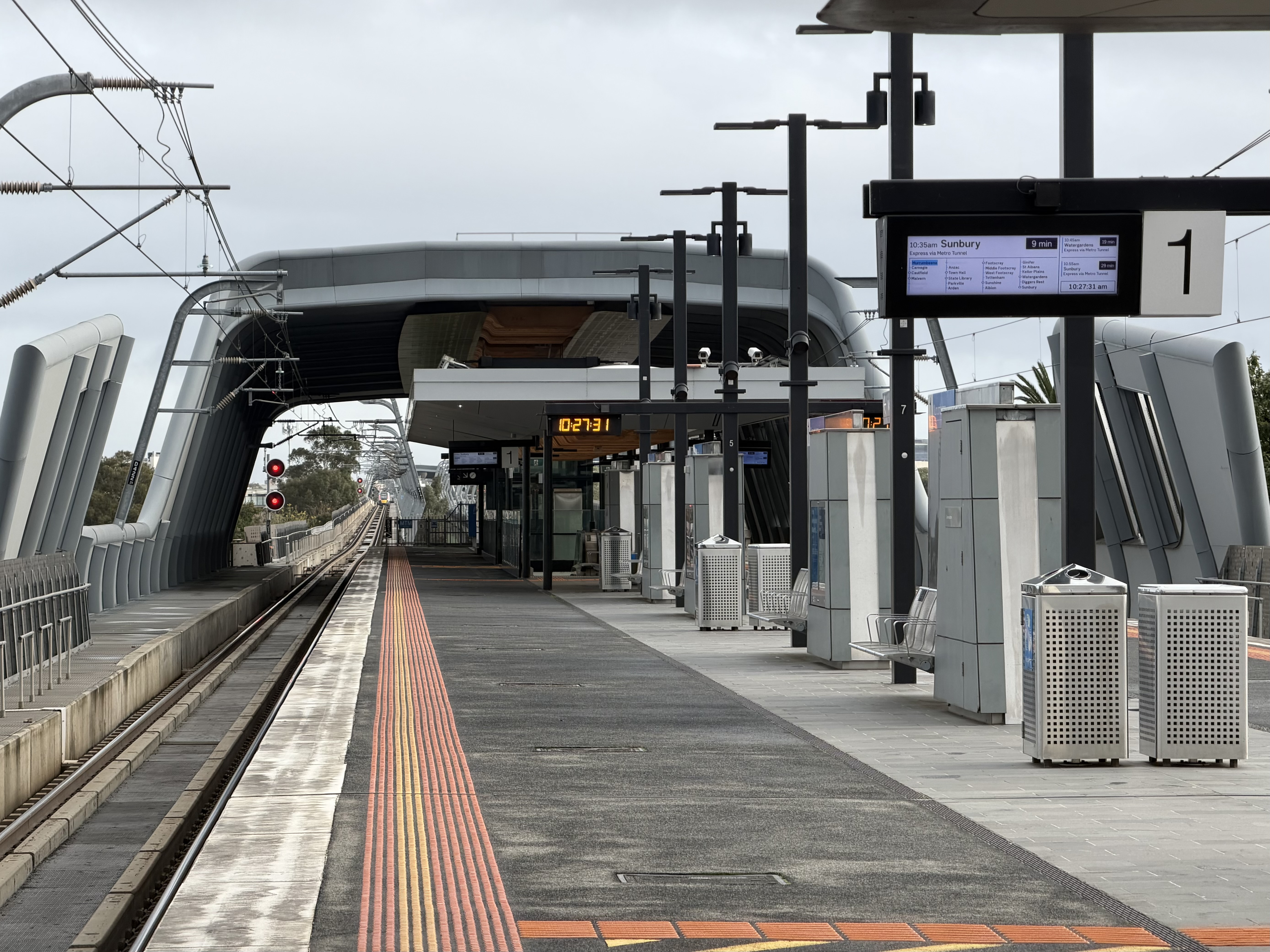
- North-west bound view from Platform 1, June 2026

General information
- Location: Neerim Road, Murrumbeena, Victoria 3163; City of Glen Eira; Australia
- Coordinates: 37°53′25″S 145°04′02″E
- System: PTV commuter rail station
- Owner: VicTrack
- Operator: Metro Trains
- Lines: Cranbourne; Pakenham
- Distance: 14.42 kilometres from Southern Cross
- Platforms: 2 (1 island)
- Tracks: 2
- Connections: Bus

Construction
- Structure type: Elevated
- Parking: 270 spaces
- Cycle facilities: Yes
- Accessible: Yes—step free access

Other information
- Status: Operational, premium station
- Station code: MRB
- Fare zone: Myki zone 1
- Website: Public Transport Victoria

History
- Opened: 14 May 1879; 147 years ago
- Rebuilt: 18 June 2018 (LXRP)
- Electrified: March 1922 (1500 V DC overhead)

Passengers
- 2005–2006: 672,730
- 2006–2007: 723,614 ▲7.56%
- 2007–2008: 773,775 ▲6.93%
- 2008–2009: 822,734 ▲6.32%
- 2009–2010: 819,486 ▼0.39%
- 2010–2011: 860,538 ▲5%
- 2011–2012: 803,638 ▼6.61%
- 2012–2013: Not measured
- 2013–2014: 800,323 ▼0.41%
- 2014–2015: 805,593 ▲0.65%
- 2015–2016: 923,028 ▲14.57%
- 2016–2017: 752,748 ▼18.44%
- 2017–2018: 572,257 ▼23.97%
- 2018–2019: 779,433 ▲36.2%
- 2019–2020: 625,600 ▼19.73%
- 2020–2021: 318,600 ▼49.07%
- 2021–2022: 351,600 ▲10.35%

Services
Preceding station	Metro Trains	Following station
Carnegie towards Watergardens or Sunbury via Metro Tunnel	Cranbourne line	Hughesdale towards Cranbourne or East Pakenham
Carnegie towards Watergardens or Sunbury via Metro Tunnel	Pakenham line	Hughesdale towards Cranbourne or East Pakenham
Track layout
Location

Murrumbeena station is a railway station operated by Metro Trains Melbourne on the Pakenham and Cranbourne lines, both part of the Melbourne rail network. It serves the south-eastern suburb of Murrumbeena, in Melbourne, Victoria, Australia.

Murrumbeena is an elevated premium station, featuring an island platform with two faces. It opened on 14 May 1879, with the current station provided in June 2018.

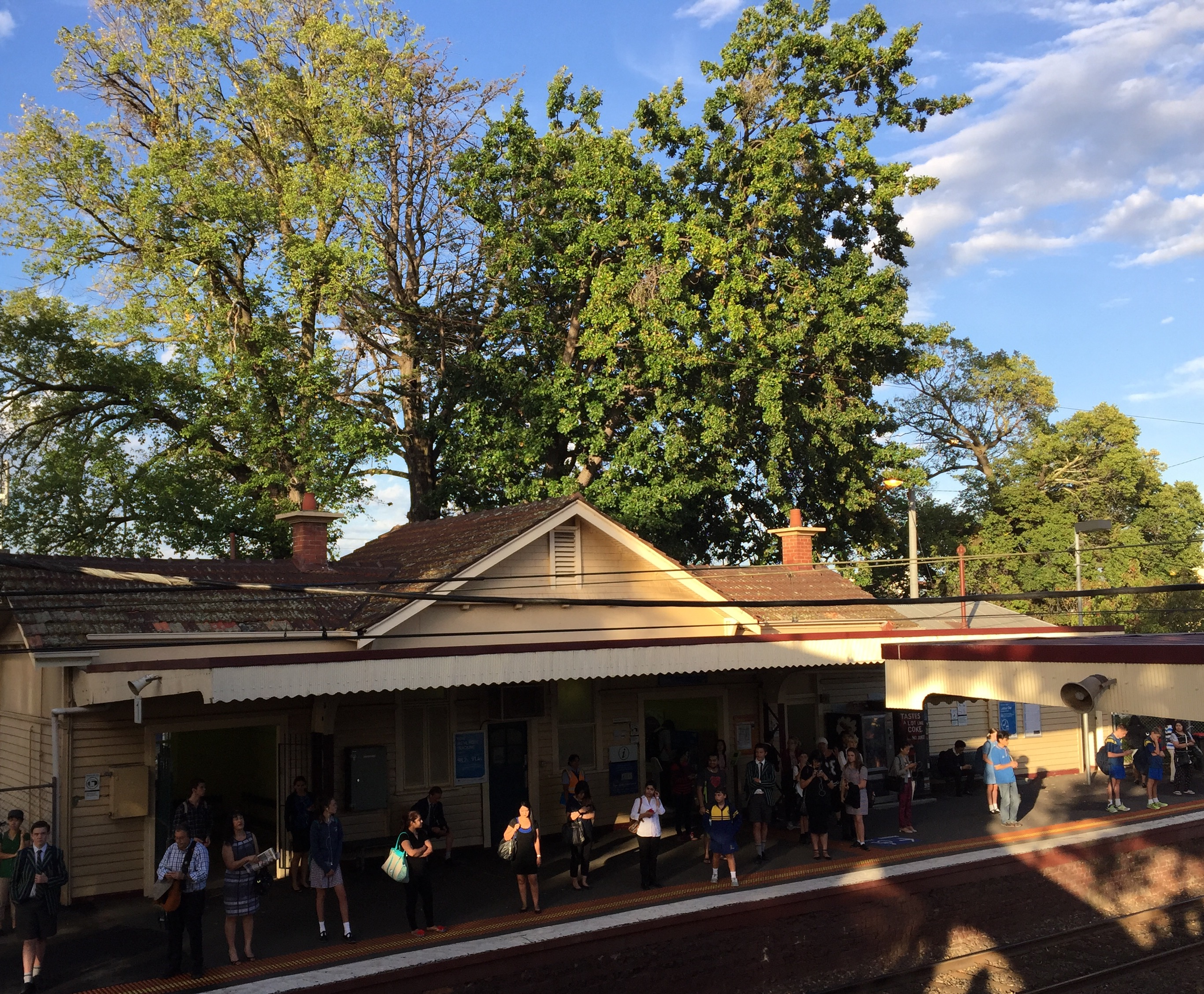
Former ground level station building on Platform 1, March 2016

== History ==
Opening one month after the railway line from Caulfield was extended to Oakleigh, Murrumbeena station gets its name from Murrumbeena Road, its name believed to be derived from an Indigenous word meaning 'belonging to you', 'welcome', or 'land of frogs'. The name may also refer to a member of the native police.

A siding was once located at the down end of Platform 2. In 1972, it was reduced in length and, in 1977, it was removed altogether.

The station once had a signal box at the up end of Platform 1, which was removed in 1979, when boom barriers were provided at the former Murrumbeena Road level crossing, which was also located at the up end of the station.

In March 2014, the Level Crossing Removal Authority announced a grade separation project to replace the Murrumbeena Road level crossing immediately to the west of the station, being done so as part of its elevated railway project. The historic station (protected by a local heritage overlay) and associated footbridge were removed and replaced with a temporary station until the completion of the project. On 18 June 2018, the rebuilt station opened, with services commencing on the new elevated lines.

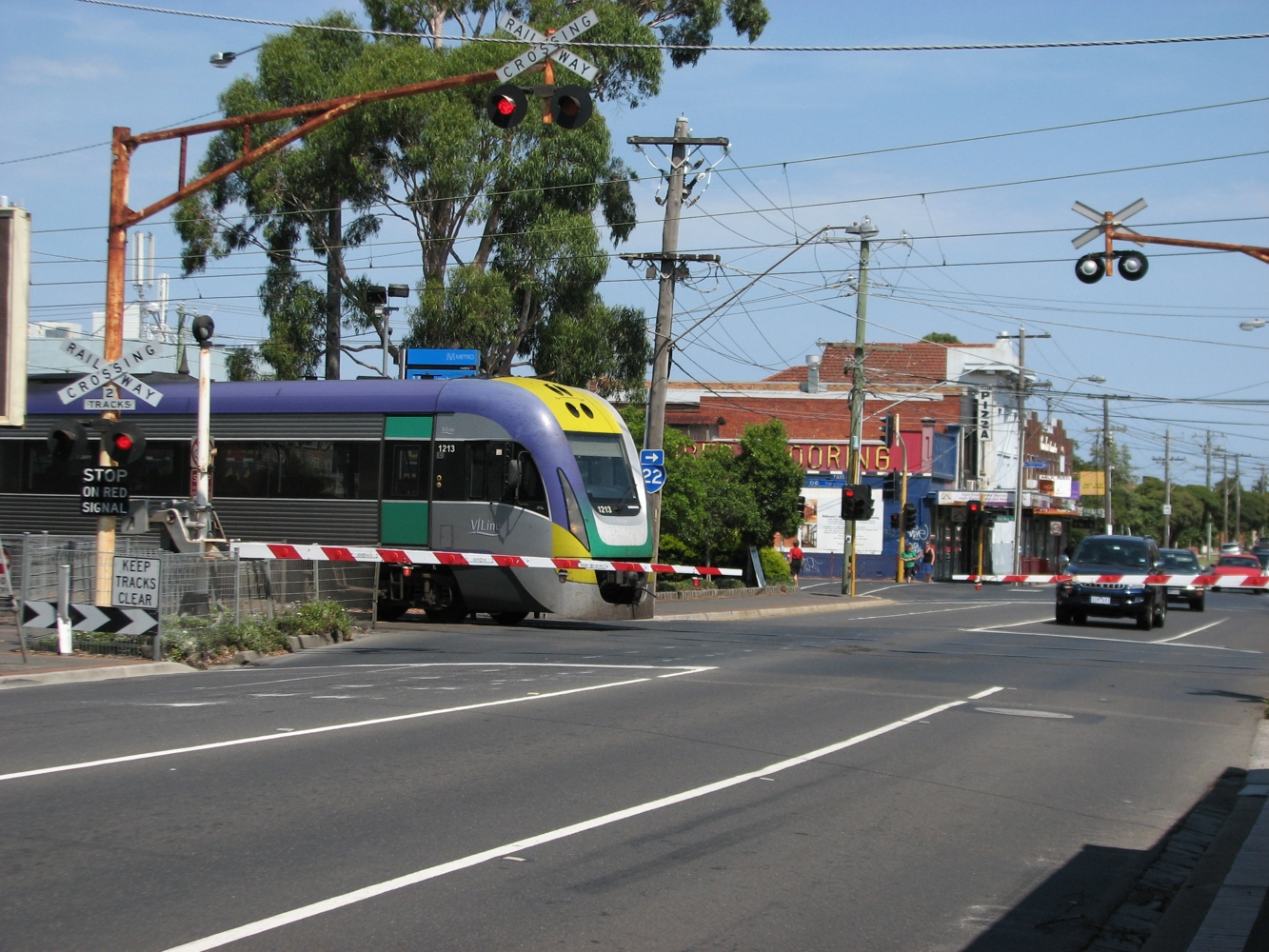
VLocity train traverses over the former Murrumbeena Road level crossing, March 2010

== Platforms and services ==
Murrumbeena has one island platform with two faces. It is serviced by Metro Trains' Pakenham and Cranbourne line services.

Murrumbeena platform arrangement
Platform	Line	Destination	Via	Service Type	Source
1	Cranbourne line Pakenham line	Sunbury, Watergardens or West Footscray	Town Hall	Limited express	
2	Cranbourne line Pakenham line	East Pakenham, Cranbourne or Westall		All stations	

== Transport links ==
CDC Melbourne operates one bus route via Murrumbeena station, under contract to Public Transport Victoria:

- 624 : Kew – Oakleigh station

Ventura Bus Lines operates two routes via Murrumbeena station, under contract to Public Transport Victoria:

- 627 : Moorabbin station – Chadstone Shopping Centre
- 822 : Chadstone Shopping Centre – Sandringham station
