= Lynbrook =

Lynbrook refers to multiple locations:

- Lynbrook, New York is a village in Nassau County, New York, United States
- Lynbrook, Victoria is a suburb of Melbourne, Australia
  - Lynbrook railway station
- Lynbrook High School is a high school in San Jose, California, United States
