= Cranbourne line =

Passenger rail service in metropolitan Melbourne, Victoria, Australia

Cranbourne

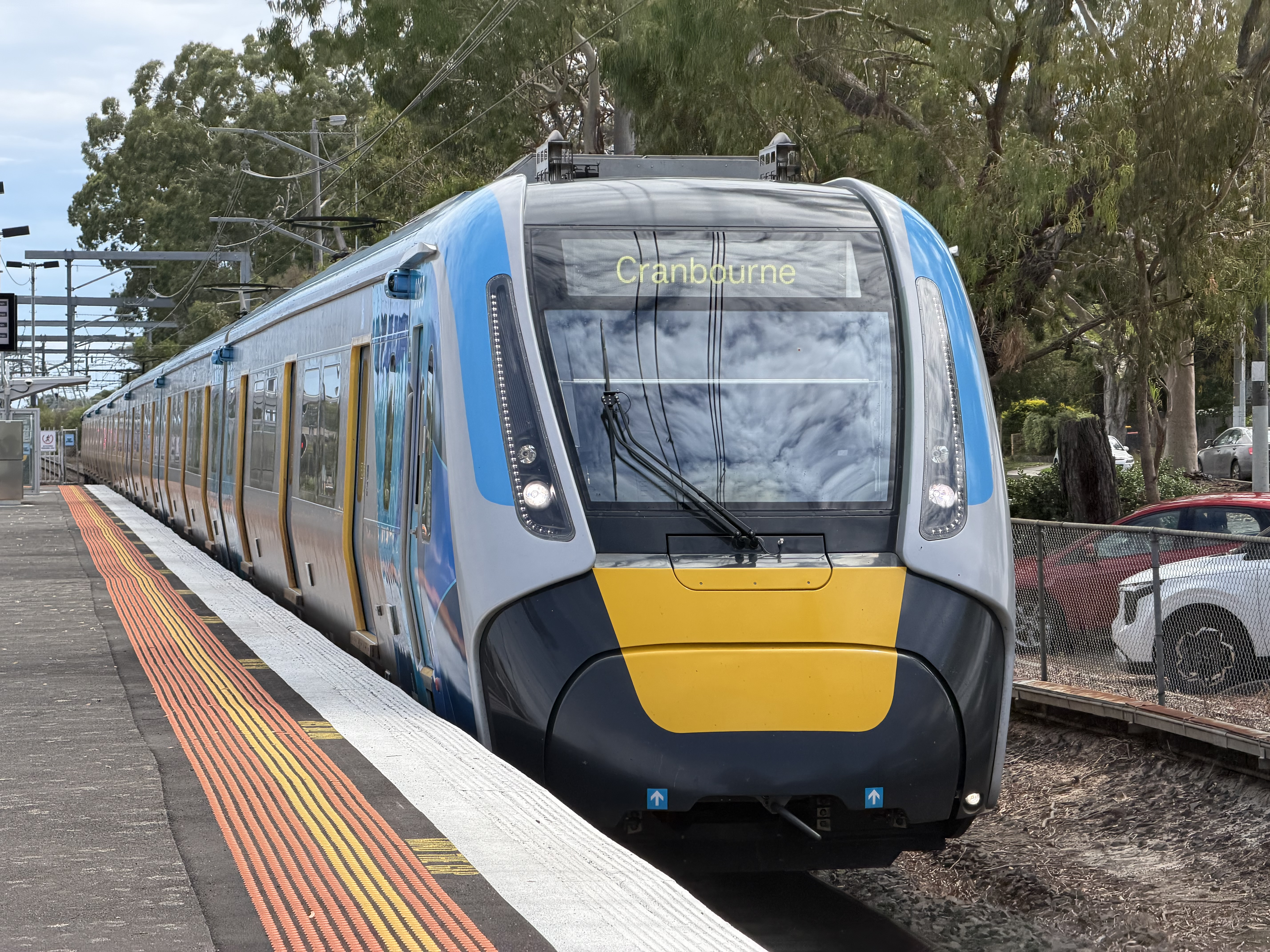
- A Cranbourne-bound service High Capacity Metro Train arrives Yarraman station Platform 2, February 2026

Overview
- Service type: Commuter rail
- System: Melbourne railway network
- Status: Operational
- Locale: Melbourne, Victoria, Australia
- Predecessor: Tooradin (1888–1890); Loch (1890–1891); Leongatha (1891–1892); Port Albert (1892–1987); Welshpool (1987–1990); Toora (1990–1992); Koo Wee Rup (1992–1993)
- First service: 1 October 1888; 138 years ago as South Gippsland line
- Current operator: Metro Trains
- Former operators: Victorian Railways (VR) (1888–1974); VR as VicRail (1974–1983); STA (V/Line) (1983–1989); PTC (V/Line) (1989–1995); PTC (The Met) (1995–1998); Bayside Trains (1998–2000); M>Train (2000–2004); Connex Melbourne (2004–2009)

Route
- Termini: Town Hall; Cranbourne
- Stops: 18
- Distance travelled: 43.920 km (27.291 mi)
- Average journey time: 57 minutes
- Service frequency: 3–4 minutes to and from Dandenong during weekday peak; 10 minutes to and from Dandenong off-peak; 10 Minutes to and from Lynbrook off-peak until 8pm; 20 minutes from Cranbourne to the city; 60 minutes early weekend mornings
- Lines used: Orbost; Port Albert

Technical
- Rolling stock: HCMT
- Track gauge: 1,600 mm (5 ft 3 in)
- Electrification: 1500 V DC overhead
- Track owner: VicTrack

The Cranbourne line is a commuter railway line in the city of Melbourne, Victoria, Australia. Operated by Metro Trains Melbourne, it is the city's second longest metropolitan railway line at 44 kilometres (27 mi). The line runs from Town Hall Station in central Melbourne to Cranbourne station in the south-east, serving 19 stations via Anzac, Caulfield, Oakleigh, and Dandenong. The line operates for approximately 20 hours a day (from approximately 4:00 am to around midnight) with 24 hour service available on Friday and Saturday nights. During peak hour, headways of up to 5 to 15 minutes are operated with services every 15–20 minutes during off-peak hours. Trains on the Cranbourne line run with a seven-car formation operated by High Capacity Metro Trains. Since 1 February 2026, the Cranbourne line is through routed with the Sunbury line, running through the Metro Tunnel via Town Hall station.

The line originally opened in 1888 branching off from the Gippsland line at Dandenong as the South Gippsland line. Services operated as far as Port Albert, with extensive branch lines featuring on the non-electrified network. The line(s) were built to serve the regional townships of Cranbourne, Koo Wee Rup, and Leongatha, amongst others. The line was closed in 1993 after a decline in usage, however, the line was reopened and electrified to Cranbourne in 1995 as part of the "Building Better Cities" program. Significant growth has occurred since its reopening, with proposals to extend the line two stations to Clyde receiving support amongst other works on the corridor.

Since the 2010s, due to the heavily utilised infrastructure of the Cranbourne line, significant improvements and upgrades have been made. A $1 billion upgrade of the corridor between Dandenong and Cranbourne is currently under construction, with improvements including the removal of all level crossings, rebuilding stations, and the duplication of 8 km (5 mi) of track. Other works taking place have included the replacement of sleepers, the introduction of new signalling technology, the introduction of new rolling stock, and other works associated with the Metro Tunnel project. These projects have improved the quality and safety of the line, and were completed by the opening of the Metro Tunnel in November 2025.

== History ==
=== 19th century ===
In 1888, the Cranbourne line (then known as the South Gippsland railway line) began operations, splitting off from the main line to Gippsland at Dandenong with an extension to Cranbourne. The line was progressively extended to Koo Wee Rup, Nyora, and Loch in 1890, Korumburra and Leongatha in 1891, and Welshpool, Alberton, and Port Albert in 1892. From its opening until 2022, the Cranbourne line was fully single tracked from Dandenong to its terminus, and was only electrified upon its reopening in the 1990s.

=== 20th century ===
==== Regional services ====
A map of the South Gippsland railway line in the 20th century

Throughout the early to mid 20th century, the South Gippsland railway line continued to open additional branch lines, including to Woodside, Barry Beach, Welshpool Jetty, Outtrim, Wonthaggi, and Strzelecki. All of these branch lines ceased their operations between the mid and late 20th century due to a decrease in patronage. On 6 June 1981, passenger services ceased operation to Yarram. In 1984, the line re-opened with services to Leongatha, until its second closure on 24 June 1993. The Barry Beach freight service ceased operations in 1992, with the line beyond Leongatha booked out of service on 30 June 1992, thus, effectively ending all traffic on the line beyond Leongatha. V/Line passenger services continued to Cranbourne till its electrification, with freight operations continuing into the late 1990s with freight services to the Koala siding.

==== Metropolitan services ====
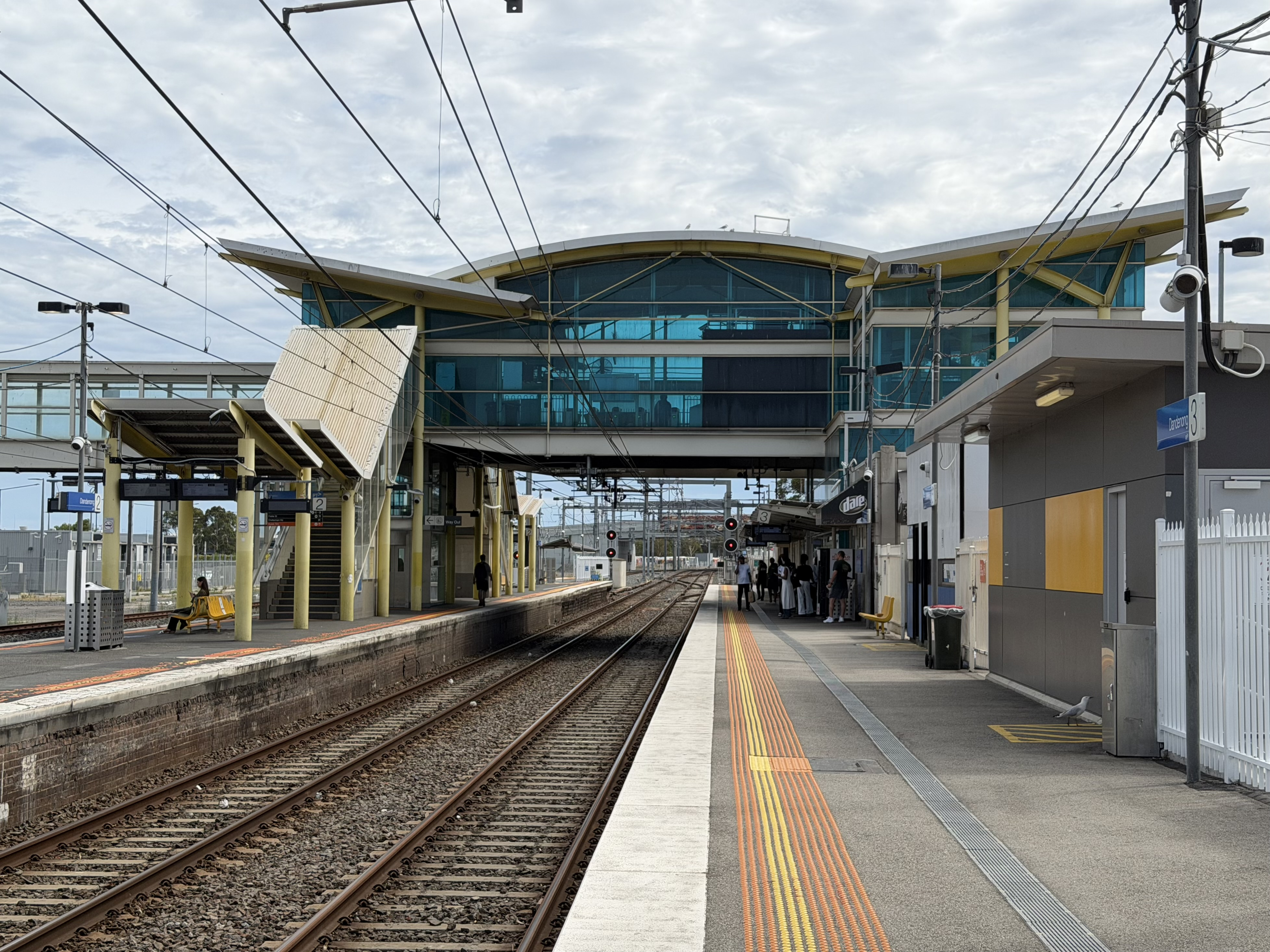
Dandenong station was rebuilt as part of the "Building Better Cities" program

In 1995, the Australian Government launched the "Building Better Cities" program, designed to redevelop Australian cities with better communities and infrastructure. The $27 million project included a rebuilt Dandenong station, a new station in Cranbourne North (Merinda Park station), the introduction of three position signalling, and electrification of the signal tracked corridor. These works resulted in the re-opening of a section of the South Gippsland line to passengers which became known as the Cranbourne Line.

Freight services continued on part of the South Gippsland line till 1998, when services from the Koala Siding were suspended. With these changes, the line became unused beyond Cranbourne. The exception was a tourist railway operation, which commenced operation between Nyora and Leongatha, and later became known as the South Gippsland Railway till its closure in January 2016.

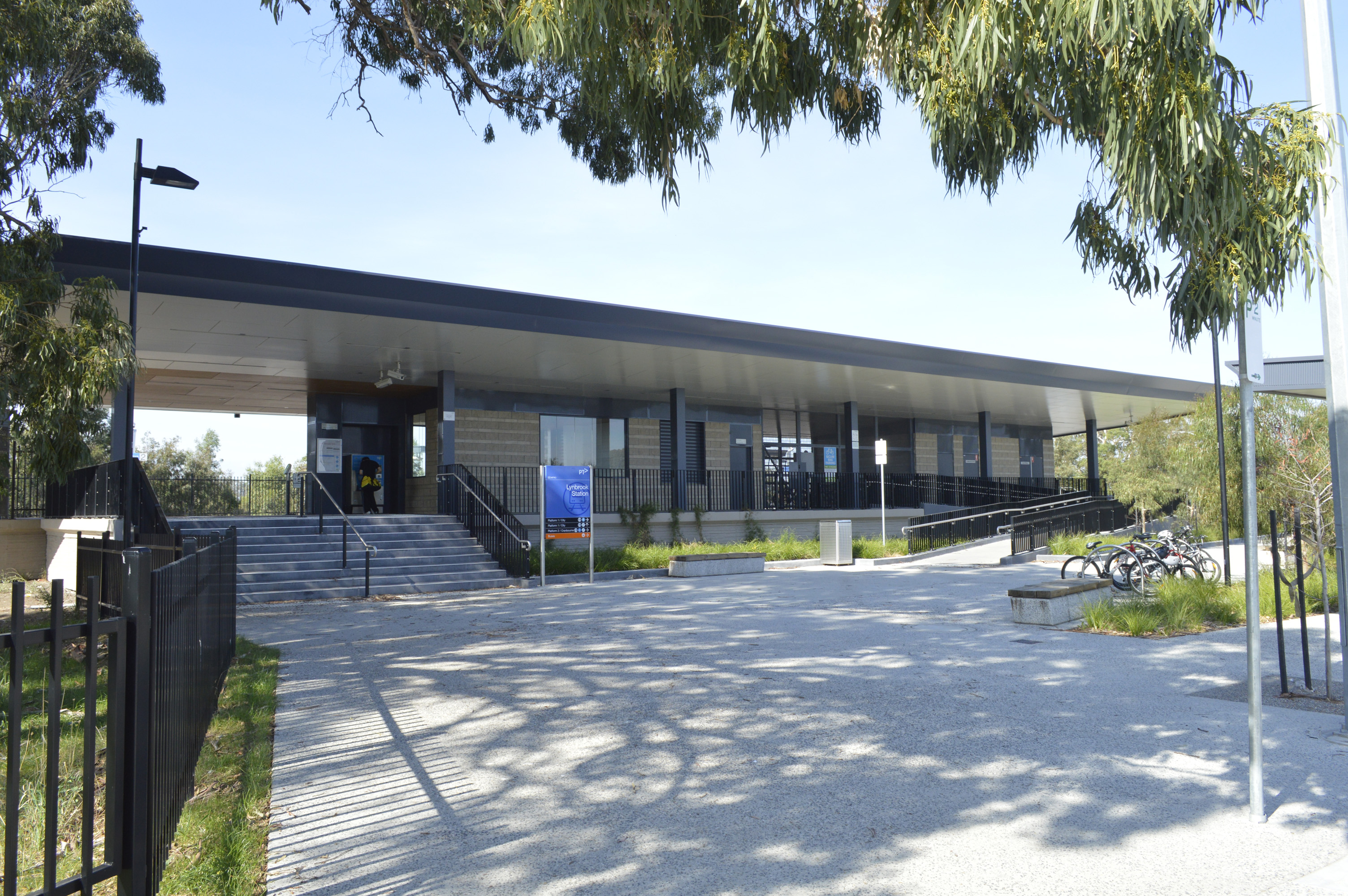
Lynbrook station, opened in 2012

=== 21st century ===
In 2008, a package of works were unveiled to upgrade the Cranbourne line to improve frequencies and the quality of service. A new siding was constructed at Cranbourne, with a capacity of 6 trains, in order to increase frequencies without having to duplicate the line. In addition to the new siding, the $37 million project also brought a major upgrade to Cranbourne station, which included the construction of an enclosed waiting room, new platform shelters, new toilet facilities, formalised paved pedestrian access, an upgraded bus interchange, and increased security.

In 2012, Lynbrook station opened after two years of construction works. The station serves the suburbs of Lynbrook and Lyndhurst, with the station featuring accessible platforms, car parking facilities, and bus stops. In 2014, the level crossing at Springvale Road, Springvale, was removed by lowering the railway into a trench. Prior to this, the level crossing was considered the most dangerous in Victoria. The removal consisted of a 1.6 km (0.99 mi) trench and the construction of a new premium station at Springvale.

In September 2019, Qube Holdings commenced operating a daily service on a short section of the line, hauling containerised cement to the Kimberly-Clark siding at Dandenong South.

== Future ==
=== Metro Tunnel ===
The map of the Metro Tunnel route through the Melbourne central business district.

The 2012 Network Development Plan identified the need for a north–south tunnel connecting the Cranbourne and Pakenham lines to the Sunbury line. In 2017, the Metro Tunnel began construction, involving the construction of five new underground stations, twin 9-kilometre (5.6 mi) tunnels, and other associated infrastructure improvements. Leaving the existing Cranbourne line alignment before South Yarra station, new stations will be built at Anzac, Town Hall (with connections to Flinders Street station), State Library (with connections to Melbourne Central), Parkville, and Arden, before continuing onto the Sunbury line. These works will be completed by 2025, and upon completion, will create a singular rail line from Cranbourne and Pakenham to Sunbury and Melbourne Airport (from 2029).

=== Melbourne Airport rail link ===
The Melbourne Airport rail link will involve the construction of a 27-kilometre (17 mi) line from Sunshine to a new station at Melbourne Airport. Connected via the Metro Tunnel, services will operate from the Cranbourne and Pakenham lines through the tunnel before splitting off at Sunshine to either Sunbury or Melbourne Airport. Construction of the line will involve the renovation of Sunshine station to allow for additional platforms, construction of new track, and the addition of two new stations at Keilor East and Melbourne Airport. Construction started in 2022 with services expected to begin in 2029.

=== Clyde extension ===
Services on the South Gippsland line were fully suspended in 1981 due to limited passenger numbers on the route. Since the closure, calls have been made to reopen the line to the suburb of Clyde. Reopening of the line to Clyde was first promised by the Australian Labor Party during the 1999 and 2002 state election campaigns, but were dumped before the 2006 election. In November 2003, a "Trainlink" bus service was introduced as an alternative, meeting each train at Cranbourne station and running on a largely one-way loop through Cranbourne East. The Bracks governments Victorian Transport Plan, released in 2008, listed the extensions and associated works as a "medium term" project, which was estimated to cost $200 million. Despite the political promise to revive the railway line for freight and passenger services by the Bracks-led Labor government in 1999, the project was abandoned in 2008 by his successor John Brumby.

In 2013, as part of Public Transport Victoria's Network Development Plan for metropolitan rail, an extension of the Cranbourne line to Clyde was earmarked to begin in the "long-term", which would equate to at least over the next 20 years. In January 2018, City of Casey advised it would need almost $3 billion worth of rail and road infrastructure projects to continue development of the region, including the extension of the metropolitan train from Cranbourne to Clyde and the duplication of the line between Dandenong and Cranbourne. In the lead up to the 2018 state election, the incumbent Andrews government announced the Cranbourne Line Upgrade, a project involving the duplication of 8 km of track between Dandenong and Cranbourne, a rebuilt Merinda Park station, the construction of a new rail connection for the Port Rail Shuttle Network, and the removal of all remaining level crossings on the corridor. Andrews argued that this project was required if an extension to Clyde was to be constructed. Opposition leader Matthew Guy instead promised that he would extend the Cranbourne line to Clyde if he won the election.

Again in the lead up to the 2022 state election, the City of Casey increased its campaign for the extension of the rail line to Clyde, including the construction of 3 new stations. The City of Casey proposal involved the construction of stations at Cranbourne East, Casey Fields (only proposed by the council), and Clyde. This proposal was supported again by opposition leader Matthew Guy, minus the station at Casey Fields. The incumbent Andrews government made no commitments to the Clyde rail extension, instead continuing construction on the Cranbourne Line Upgrade. The 2022 state election resulted in another Labor victory, with the Andrews government pushing ahead with the Cranbourne Line Upgrade, with the extension to Clyde remaining stagnant ever since.

=== Level Crossing Removals ===
The Level Crossing Removal Project has announced the removal of all 15 remaining level crossings on the Cranbourne line, to be completed in stages from 2018 to 2025. All level crossings between Caulfield and Dandenong were removed in 2018 as part of the Caulfield to Dandenong skyrail project. This included the removal of nine level crossings and the reconstruction of five elevated stations along the corridor. The second phase of removals involves removing individual crossings along the corridor through a variety of methods by 2025. Some crossings have been removed through elevating the rail corridor, some by lowering or raising the road, with other crossings being removed by closing the crossing off from motor traffic. These projects will leave the entirety of the Cranbourne line level crossing free by 2025, with projects on the Sunbury line leaving the entire Sunshine-Dandenong corridor crossing free by the opening of the Metro Tunnel in 2025.

=== Cranbourne line upgrade ===
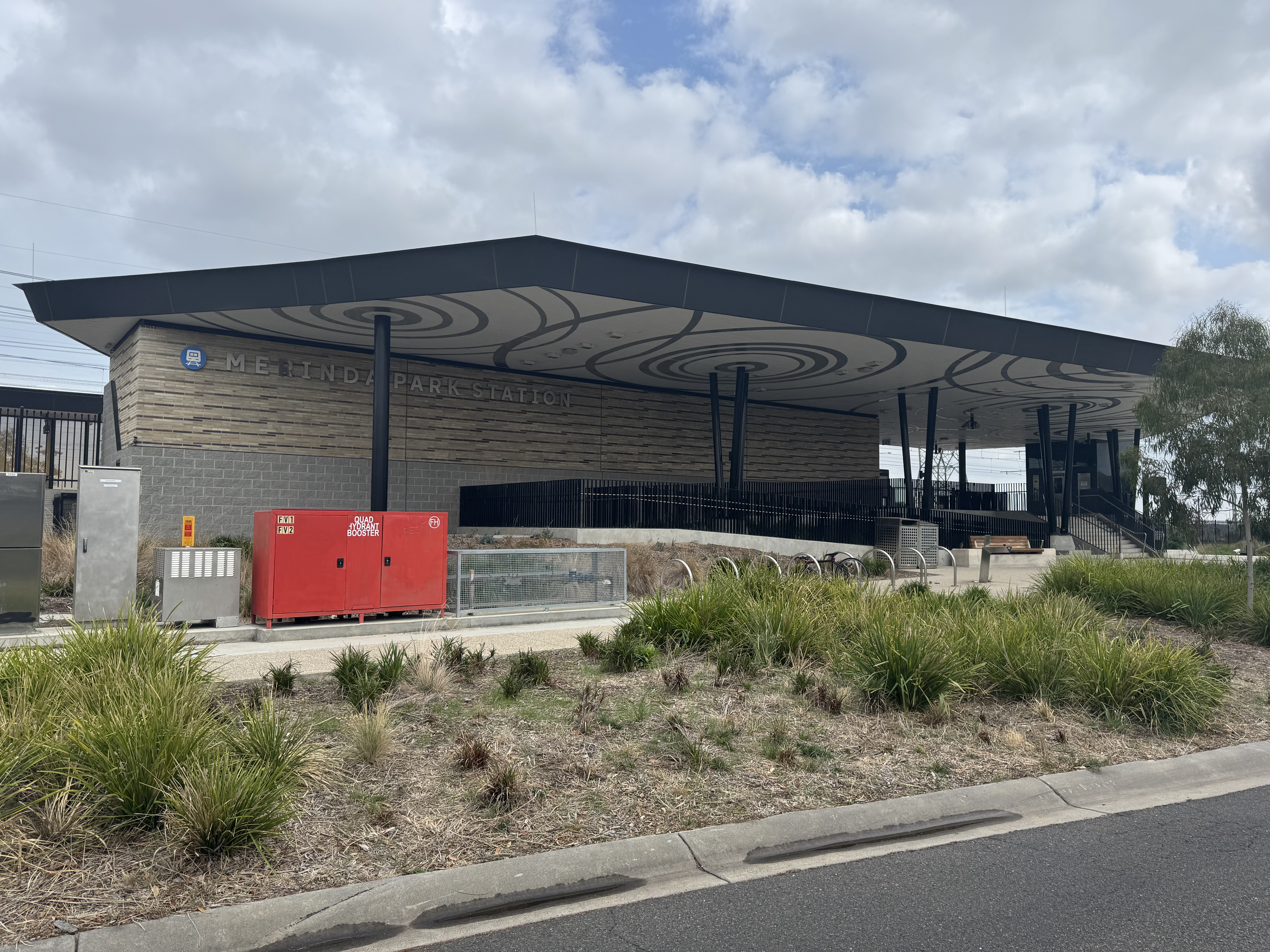
Merinda Park station was rebuilt as part of the upgrade works

Announced in the lead up to the 2018 Victorian state election, the Cranbourne line would receive a $1 billion upgrade to coincide with the opening of the Metro Tunnel. The project is being delivered by the Level Crossing Removal Project, and will include:

- The removal of the four remaining level crossings (100% complete)
  - Evans Road, Lyndhurst (complete)
  - Greens Road, Dandenong South (complete)
  - Camms Road, Cranbourne (complete)
  - Webster Street, Dandenong (complete)
- The duplication of 8 kilometres (5 mi) of single track between Dandenong South and Cranbourne (complete)
- The installation of a second rail bridge at Abbotts Road and Eumemmerring Creek in Dandenong South (complete)
- The reconstruction of Merinda Park station (complete)
- The delivery of a new rail connection for the Port Rail Shuttle Network (underway)

In 2020, the level crossing at Evans Road in Lyndhurst was removed through the construction of a road bridge over the rail line. In early 2021, the first platform of the newly rebuilt Merinda Park station was opened, with the second platform opening a year later. In February 2022, the second platform at Merinda Park was opened along with the completion of duplication works. After the duplication works, the line could now handle 10-minute frequencies during peak periods. As a result, the timetable was rewritten to allow for 50 extra Cranbourne services to operate every week. Alongside the duplication works, all level crossings on the line will be removed. The Cranbourne line is projected to become the first crossing-free line on the network, with the remaining two crossings and other upgrade works expected to be completed by 2025.

== Network and Operations ==
=== Services ===
Services on the Cranbourne line operates from approximately 4:00 am to around 11:30 pm daily. In general, during peak hours, train frequency is 5 minutes on the Dandenong corridor (combined with the Pakenham line) and 10 minutes in the AM peak on the Cranbourne line while during non-peak hours the frequency is reduced to 20–30 minutes throughout the entire route. Cranbourne line services operate as shuttles to and from Dandenong between 10:00 pm and 6:00 am, connecting with Pakenham line trains. During the peak, some services originate and terminate at Westall or Dandenong. Services run anticlockwise through the City Loop, and from 2025, Cranbourne line services will cease to stop at South Yarra, Richmond, and all City Loop stations when trains are rerouted through the Metro Tunnel upon opening. On Friday nights and weekends, services run 24 hours a day, with 60 minute frequencies available outside of normal operating hours. Since 13 February 2022, some off-peak daytime Cranbourne and Pakenham line services stop at Malvern station, running express between South Yarra and Malvern stations.

Freight operations are limited, with Qube Holdings operating a daily service on a short section of the line hauling containerised cement to the Kimberly-Clark siding at Dandenong South.

Train services on the Cranbourne line are also subjected to maintenance and renewal works, usually on selected Fridays and Saturdays. Shuttle bus services are provided throughout the duration of works for affected commuters.

==== Stopping Patterns ====
Legend — Station Status

- ◼ Premium Station – Station staffed from first to last train
- ◻ Host Station – Usually staffed during morning peak, however this can vary for different stations on the network.

Legend — Stopping Patterns
All services operate via the Metro Tunnel

- ● – All trains stop
- | – Trains pass and do not stop

Cranbourne Services
Station	Zone	Local	Shuttle
◼ Town Hall	1	●	
◼ Anzac	1	●	
◻ Malvern	1	●	
◼ Caulfield	1	●	
◼ Carnegie	1	●	
◼ Murrumbeena	1	●	
◻ Hughesdale	1/2	●	
◼ Oakleigh	1/2	●	
◻ Huntingdale	1/2	●	
◼ Clayton	2	●	
◼ Westall	2	●	
◼ Springvale	2	●	
Sandown Park	2	●	
◼ Noble Park	2	●	
Yarraman	2	●	
◼ Dandenong	2	●	●
Lynbrook	2	●	●
Merinda Park	2	●	●
◼ Cranbourne	2	●	●

=== Operators ===
The Cranbourne line has had a total of 5 operators since its reopening in 1995. The majority of operations throughout its history have been privately run.

The government-owned Public Transport Corporation and later Bayside Trains operated the line for a short 4 years till the 1999 privatisation of Melbourne's rail network.

Bayside Trains was privatised in August 1999 and later rebranded M>Train. In 2002, M>Train was placed into receivership and the state government regained ownership of the line, with KPMG appointed as receivers to operate M>Train on behalf of the state government. Two years later, rival train operator Connex Melbourne took over the M>Train operations including the Cranbourne line. Metro Trains Melbourne, the current private operator, then took over the operations in 2009. The private operators have had a combined operational period of 27 years.

Past and present operators of the Cranbourne line:
Operator	Assumed operations	Ceased operations	Length of operations
Public Transport Corporation	1995	1998	3 years
Bayside Trains (government operator)	1998	1999	1 years
M>Train	1999	2004	5 years
Connex Melbourne	2004	2009	5 years
Metro Trains Melbourne	2009	incumbent	16 years (ongoing)

=== Route ===
Interactive map of the Cranbourne line in south-eastern Melbourne.

The Cranbourne line forms a relatively linear route from the Melbourne CBD to its terminus in Cranbourne. The line is 44 kilometres (27 mi) long and predominantly double-tracked; however, between Flinders Street station and Richmond, the track is widened to 12 tracks, narrowing to 6 tracks between Richmond and South Yarra before again narrowing to 4 tracks between South Yarra and Caulfield. After Caulfield station, the track again narrows to two tracks, which remain for the rest of the route. The only underground section of the Cranbourne line is in the City Loop, where the service stops at 3 underground stations and operates in a counter-clockwise direction. Exiting the city, the Cranbourne line traverses mainly flat country with few curves and fairly minimal earthworks for most of the line. However, between South Yarra and Malvern, the rail corridor has been lowered into a cutting to eliminate level crossings, and between Malvern and Caulfield, the corridor it has been raised on an embankment for the same reason. After Caulfield, the line formerly had numerous level crossings; all have now been abolished between Caulfield and Dandenong as part of an elevated rail project, as well as some older bridges over and under roads. The remaining crossing will be fully removed by 2025.

The line follows the same alignment as the Pakenham line along the Gippsland line, with the two services splitting onto different routes at Dandenong. The Cranbourne line turns south and branches on to the South Gippsland line, while the Pakenham line continues along the Gippsland line. Most of the rail line goes through built-up suburbs and some industrial areas, but after Dandenong, the line gets into a mix of both open fields and suburbia. This outer portion of the line is one of Melbourne's main growth corridors, which is rapidly replacing farmland with housing and commercial developments, adding additional passengers to the line each year.

=== Stations ===
The line serves 24 stations across 44 kilometres (27 mi) of track. The stations are a mix of elevated, lowered, underground, and ground level designs. Underground stations are present only in the City Loop, with the majority of elevated and lowered stations being constructed as part of level crossing removals. From 2025, services will cease to stop at Flinders Street, Southern Cross, Flagstaff, Melbourne Central, Parliament, Richmond, and South Yarra stations due to the opening of the Metro Tunnel.

Station	Image	Accessibility	Opened	Terrain	Train connections	Other connections
Town Hall		Yes - step free access	2025	Underground	16 connections: * Alamein line; Belgrave line; Craigieburn line; Flemington Racecourse line; Frankston line; Gippsland line; Glen Waverley line; Hurstbridge line; Lilydale line; Mernda line; Pakenham line; Sandringham line; Sunbury line; Upfield line; Werribee line; Williamstown line	Trains Trams
Anzac		Yes - step free access	2025	Underground	2 connection: Pakenham line; Sunbury line	Trams Buses
Malvern		No—steep ramp	1879	Lowered	2 connections: Frankston line; Pakenham line	Trams
Caulfield		No—steep ramp	1879	Ground level	3 connections: Frankston line; Gippsland line; Pakenham line	Trams Buses
Carnegie		Yes—step free access	1879	Elevated	1 connection: Pakenham line	Buses
Murrumbeena		Yes—step free access	1879	Elevated	1 connection: Pakenham line	Buses
Hughesdale		Yes—step free access	1925	Elevated	1 connection: Pakenham line	Buses
Oakleigh		Yes—step free access	1877	Ground level	1 connection: Pakenham line	Buses
Huntingdale		No—steep ramp	1927	Ground level	1 connection: Pakenham line	Buses
Clayton		Yes—step free access	1880	Elevated	2 connections: Gippsland line; Pakenham line	Buses
Westall		Yes—step free access	1951	Ground level	1 connection: Pakenham line	Buses
Springvale		Yes—step free access	1880	Lowered	1 connection: Pakenham line	Buses
Sandown Park		No—steep ramp	1888	Ground level	1 connection: Pakenham line	Buses
Noble Park		Yes—step free access	1913	Elevated	1 connection: Pakenham line	Buses
Yarraman		No—steep ramp	1976	Ground level	1 connection: Pakenham line	Buses
Dandenong		No—steep ramp	1877	Ground level	2 connections: Gippsland line; Pakenham line	Buses Coaches
Lynbrook		Yes—step free access	2012	Ground level		Buses
Merinda Park		Yes—step free access	1995	Ground level		Buses
Cranbourne		Yes—step free access	1888	Ground level		Buses Coaches

Station histories
Station	Opened	Closed	Age	Notes
Flinders Street	12 September 1854		172 years	From 2025, services will cease to stop due to the opening of the Metro Tunnel; Formerly Melbourne Terminus
Southern Cross	17 January 1859		167 years	From 2025, services will cease to stop due to the opening of the Metro Tunnel; Formerly Batman's Hill; Formerly Spencer Street
Flagstaff	27 May 1985		41 years	From 2025, services will cease to stop due to the opening of the Metro Tunnel
Melbourne Central	26 January 1981		45 years	From 2025, services will cease to stop due to the opening of the Metro Tunnel; Formerly Museum
Parliament	22 January 1983		43 years	From 2025, services will cease to stop due to the opening of the Metro Tunnel
Princes Bridge	8 February 1859	1 October 1866	7 years	
Princes Bridge	2 April 1879	30 June 1980	101 years	
Botanic Gardens	2 March 1859	c. April 1862	Approx. 3 years	
Punt Road	8 February 1859	12 December 1859	10 months	Replaced by Swan Street (200m further along line)
Richmond	12 December 1859		166 years	From 2025, services will cease to stop due to the opening of the Metro Tunnel; Formerly Swan Street
Cremorne	12 December 1859	c. 28 December 1863	Approx. 4 years	
South Yarra	22 December 1860		165 years	From 2025, services will cease to stop due to the opening of the Metro Tunnel; Formerly Gardiner's Creek Road
Hawksburn	7 May 1889		137 years	Not a stop since 31 January 2021 due to a timetable reshuffle
Toorak	7 May 1879		147 years	Not a stop since 31 January 2021 due to a timetable reshuffle
Armadale	7 May 1879		147 years	Not a stop since 31 January 2021 due to a timetable reshuffle
Malvern	7 May 1879		147 years	
Caulfield	7 May 1879		147 years	
Carnegie	14 May 1879		147 years	Formerly Rosstown
Murrumbeena	14 May 1879		147 years	
Hughesdale	28 February 1925		101 years	
Oakleigh	8 October 1877		149 years	
Huntingdale	25 June 1927		99 years	Formerly Eastoakleigh
Clayton	6 January 1880		146 years	Formerly Clayton's Road
Westall	6 February 1951		75 years	
APEX Siding (Westall)	?	-		Used by Qube Holdings
Springvale	1 September 1880		146 years	Formerly Spring Vale
Sandown Park	c. December 1888	15 May 1955	Approx. 66 years	Formerly Oakleigh Park Racecourse
Sandown Park	19 June 1965		61 years	Formerly Oakleigh Park Racecourse
Noble Park	3 February 1913		113 years	
Yarraman	21 December 1976		49 years	
Dandenong	8 October 1877		149 years	
Bonlac Foods Limited Siding	23 August 1968	5 June 1994	25 years	Formerly Amalgamated Co-op Marketers (Australia) Ltd Siding
Bombardier Siding	10 May 1955		71 years	Formerly Commonwealth Engineering Siding; Formerly ASEA Brown Boveri Siding
Kimberley Clark Siding	21 December 1970	24 January 2023	52 years	Formerly Tubemakers of Australia Ltd siding
Australian Window Glass Siding	?	?		
Lyndhurst	1 October 1888	9 June 1981	92 years	
Lynbrook	22 April 2012		14 years	
Merinda Park	24 March 1995		31 years	
Cranbourne	1 October 1888		138 years	Temporarily closed in 1993 and re-opened in 1995

==== Pre Metro Tunnel stations ====
Station	Accessibility	Opened	Terrain	Train connections	Other connections	Notes
Flinders Street	Yes—step free access	1854	Lowered	16 connections: Alamein line; Belgrave line; Craigieburn line; Flemington Racecourse line; Frankston line; Gippsland line; Glen Waverley line; Hurstbridge line; Lilydale line; Mernda line; Pakenham line; Sandringham line; Sunbury line; Upfield line; Werribee line; Williamstown line	Trams Buses	
Southern Cross	Yes—step free access	1859	Ground level	27 connections: Alamein line; Albury line; Ararat line; Ballarat line; Belgrave line; Bendigo line; Craigieburn line; Echuca line; Flemington Racecourse line; Geelong line; Gippsland line; Glen Waverley line; Hurstbridge line; Lilydale line; Maryborough line; Mernda line; NSW TrainLink Southern; Pakenham line; Seymour line; Shepparton line; Sunbury line; Swan Hill line; The Overland; Upfield line; Warrnambool line; Werribee line; Williamstown line	Trams Buses Coaches SkyBus	
Flagstaff	Yes—step free access	1985	Underground	10 connections: Alamein line; Belgrave line; Craigieburn line; Glen Waverley line; Hurstbridge line; Lilydale line; Mernda line; Pakenham line; Sunbury line; Upfield line	Trams	
Melbourne Central	Yes—step free access	1981	Underground	10 connections: Alamein line; Belgrave line; Craigieburn line; Glen Waverley line; Hurstbridge line; Lilydale line; Mernda line; Pakenham line; Sunbury line; Upfield line	Trams Buses	
Parliament	Yes—step free access	1983	Underground	10 connections: Alamein line; Belgrave line; Craigieburn line; Glen Waverley line; Hurstbridge line; Lilydale line; Mernda line; Pakenham line; Sunbury line; Upfield line	Trams	
Richmond	No—steep ramp	1859	Elevated	8 connections: Alamein line; Belgrave line; Frankston line; Gippsland line; Glen Waverley line; Lilydale line; Pakenham line; Sandringham line	Trams Buses	
South Yarra	No—steep ramp	1860	Lowered	3 connections: Frankston line; Pakenham line; Sandringham line	Trams	

== Infrastructure ==
=== Rolling stock ===
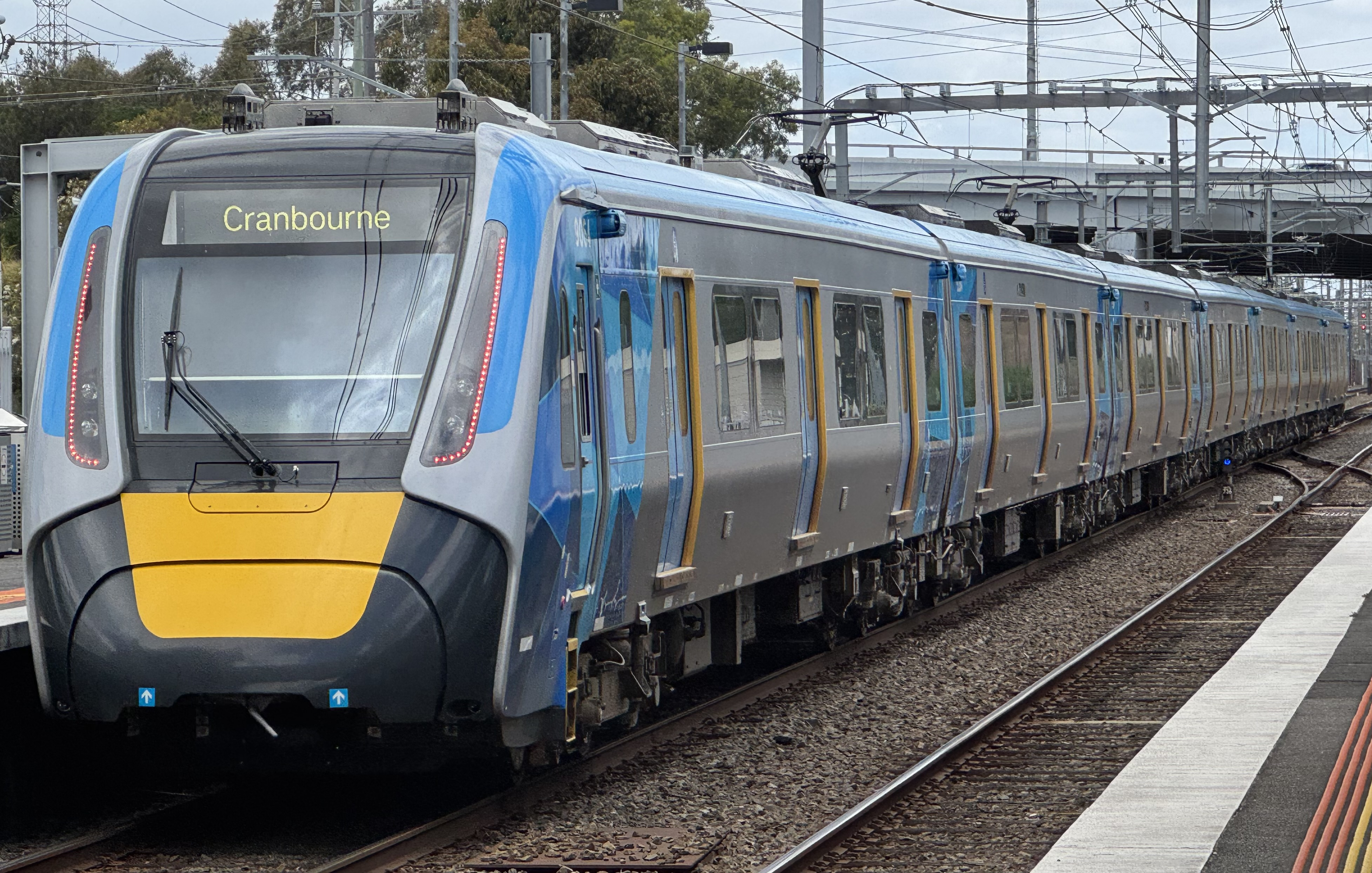
A Cranbourne bound High Capacity Metro Train departing at Westall station, December 2025

The Cranbourne line uses a fleet of electric multiple unit (EMU) High Capacity Metro Trains operating in a seven-car configuration, with three doors per side on each carriage and can accommodate of up to 1,380 passengers in each train-set. Shared with the Pakenham, Sunbury, and Airport lines, the rolling stock will consist of 70 High Capacity Metro Trains (HCMT), once fully delivered. They are built in Changchun, China, with final assembly occurring in Newport, Melbourne, by Evolution Rail, a consortium composed of CRRC Changchun Railway Vehicles, Downer Rail and Plenary Group.

Previously, the Cranbourne line was served by a fleet of Comeng and Siemens Nexas trains. The oldest Comeng trains (stage 1 and some stage 2) have been retired and scrapped as part of the HCMT introduction, however, some of these trains have been displaced onto other Melbourne metropolitan lines.

Alongside the passenger trains, Cranbourne line tracks and equipment are maintained by a fleet of engineering trains. The four types of engineering trains are: the shunting train; designed for moving trains along non-electrified corridors and for transporting other maintenance locomotives, for track evaluation; designed for evaluating track and its condition, the overhead inspection train; designed for overhead wiring inspection, and the infrastructure evaluation carriage designed for general infrastructure evaluation. Most of these trains are repurposed locomotives previously used by V/Line, Metro Trains, and the Southern Shorthaul Railroad.

=== Accessibility ===
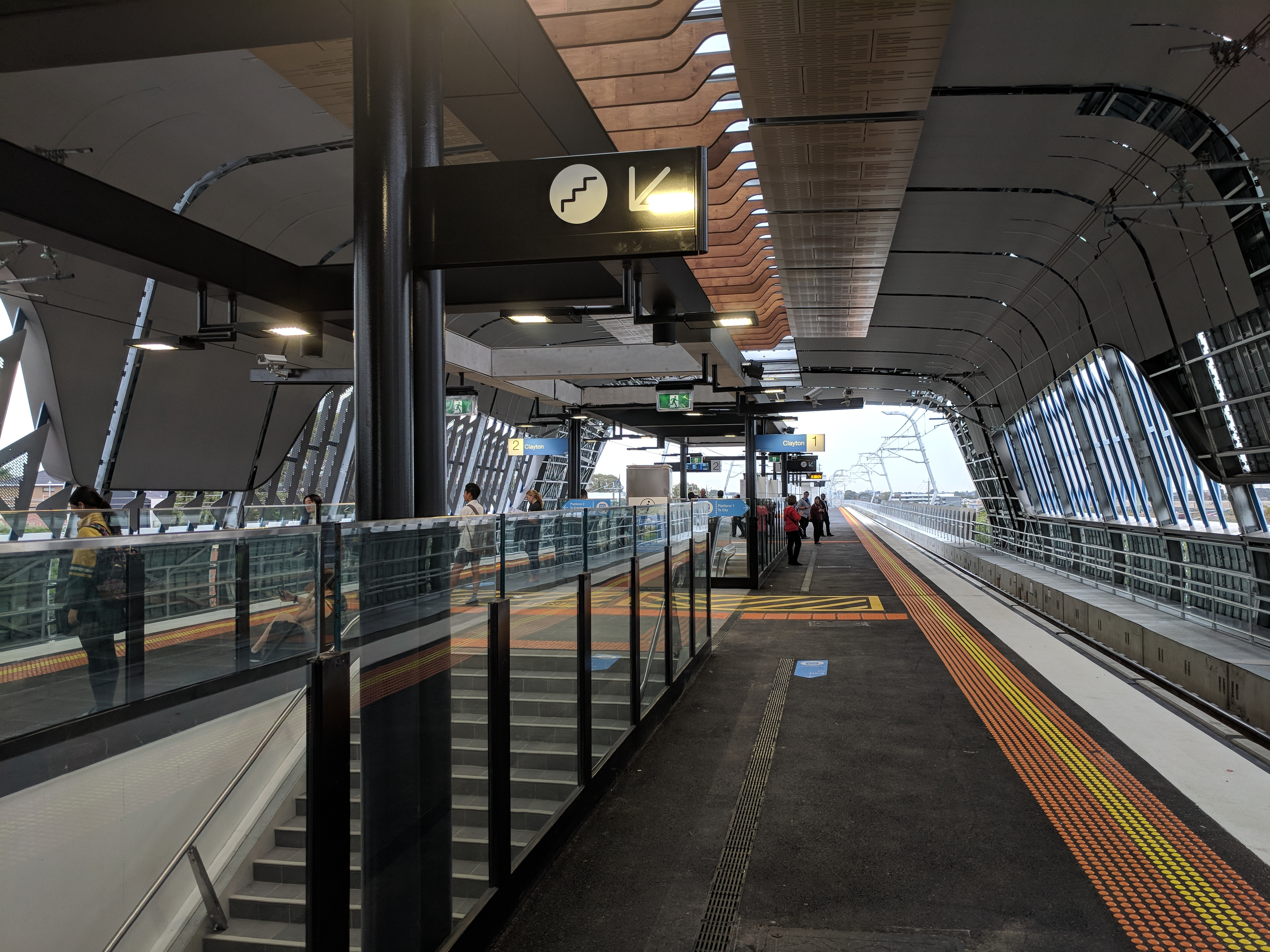
The rebuilt Clayton station that complies with DDA guidelines.

In compliance with the Disability Discrimination Act of 1992, all stations that are new-built or rebuilt are fully accessible and comply with these guidelines. The majority of stations on the corridor are fully accessible, however, there are some stations that haven't been upgraded to meet these guidelines. These stations do feature ramps, however, they have a gradient greater than 1 in 14. Stations that are fully accessible feature ramps that have a gradient less than 1 in 14, have at-grade paths, or feature lifts. These stations typically also feature tactile boarding indicators, independent boarding ramps, wheelchair accessible myki barriers, hearing loops, and widened paths.

Projects improving station accessibility have included the Level Crossing Removal Project, which involves station rebuilds and upgrades, individual station upgrade projects, and associated Metro Tunnel works. These works have made significant strides in improving network accessibility, with more than 66% of Cranbourne line stations classed as fully accessible. This number is expected to grow within the coming years, as a network restructure associated with the opening of the Metro Tunnel is completed by 2025.

=== Signalling ===
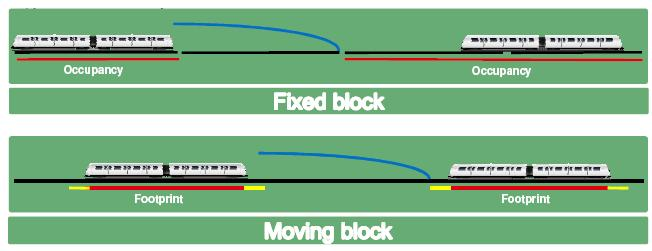
Difference between both fixed block and moving block signalling systems

Since its re-opening in 1995, the Cranbourne line had used a fixed-block, three-position signalling system designed for lower frequencies and less services. However, the ageing system had undermined reliability due to the presence of system faults and limited frequencies, requiring the Cranbourne, Pakenham, and Sunbury lines to upgrade their signalling system. Since 2021, high-capacity signalling (HCS) has been rolling out on the Pakenham, Cranbourne, and Sunbury lines, allowing trains to safely run closer together and run more frequently. The new system is being delivered by CPB Contractors and Bombardier Transportation under the Rail Systems Alliance. These works valued at $1 billion includes the roll-out of 55 kilometres (34 mi) of HCS and communications systems on the aforementioned lines, allowing an increase in reliability and frequency. The line will be equipped with Bombardier's CityFlo 650 communications-based train control system, which will enable operation at 2–3 minute headways.

The upgrade works were completed in phases from 2021. With the upgraded signalling system, trains are now able to run closer to each other. The new system was tested on the Mernda line and a section of the Cranbourne line before being fully implemented. In March 2022, the Cranbourne line underwent further testing of high-tech signalling equipment, to ensure the new trains and signalling system can safely run alongside older-generation trains—including freight and V/Line trains—and the existing signalling system.
