= Lynbrook railway station =

Railway station in Melbourne, Australia

Lynbrook
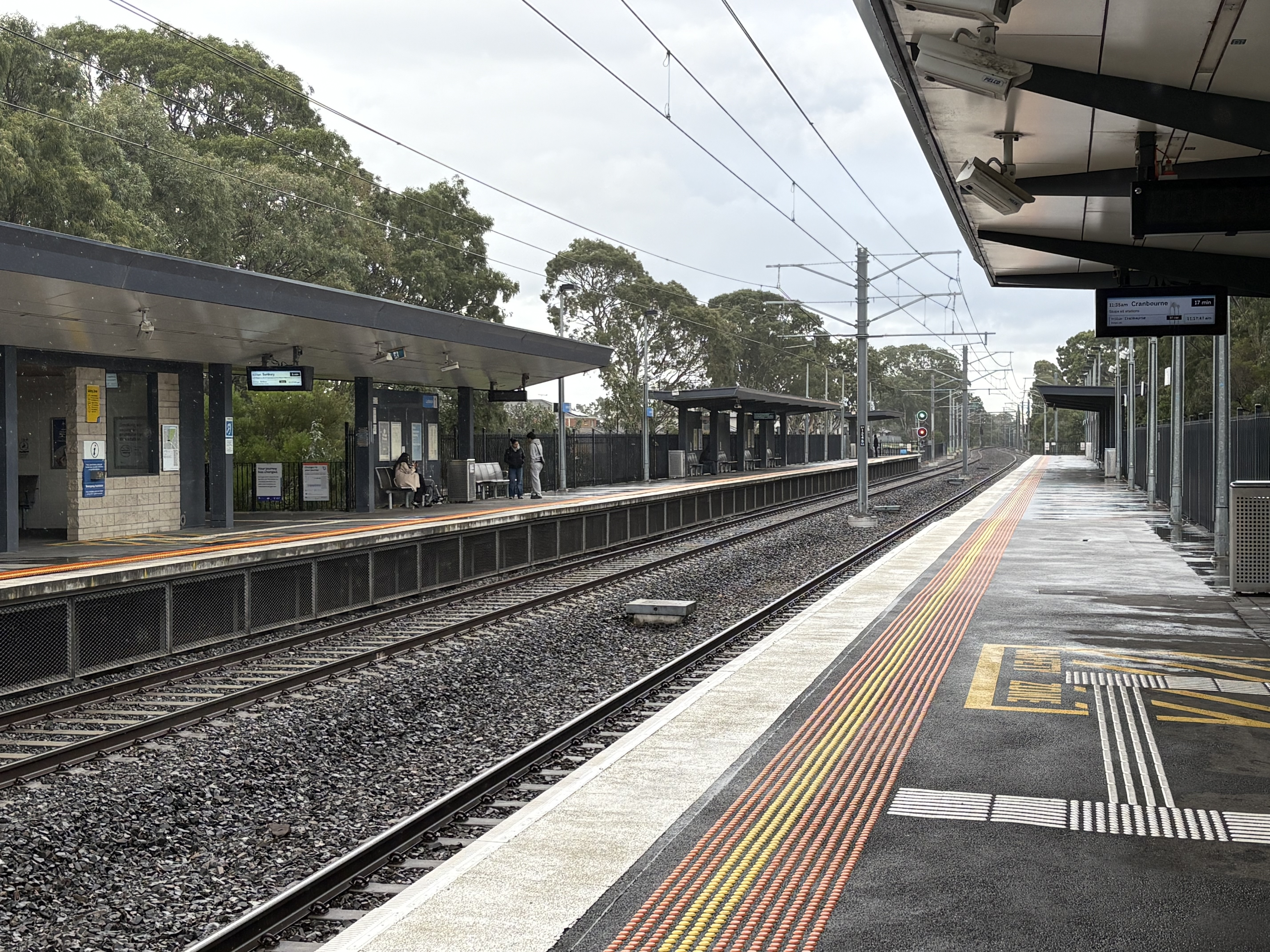
- Northbound view from Platform 2, June 2026

General information
- Location: Moreton Bay Boulevard, Lyndhurst, Victoria 3975; City of Casey; Australia
- Coordinates: 38°3′28″S 145°14′58″E
- System: PTV commuter rail station
- Owner: VicTrack
- Operator: Metro Trains
- Line: Cranbourne
- Distance: 39.50 kilometres from Southern Cross
- Platforms: 2 side
- Tracks: 2
- Connections: Bus

Construction
- Structure type: Ground
- Parking: 250
- Cycle facilities: Yes
- Accessible: Yes—step-free access

Other information
- Status: Operational, unstaffed
- Station code: LBK
- Fare zone: Myki zone 2
- Website: Public Transport Victoria

History
- Opened: 22 April 2012; 14 years ago
- Electrified: March 1995 (1500 V DC overhead)

Passengers
- 2011–2012: 44,167
- 2012–2013: Not measured
- 2013–2014: 335,714 ▲660.1%
- 2014–2015: 362,772 ▲8.05%
- 2015–2016: 420,888 ▲16.02%
- 2016–2017: 446,745 ▲6.14%
- 2017–2018: 406,648 ▼8.97%
- 2018–2019: 390,339 ▼4.01%
- 2019–2020: 352,250 ▼9.75%
- 2020–2021: 174,550 ▼50.44%
- 2021–2022: 203,150 ▲16.38%

Services
Preceding station	Metro Trains	Following station
Dandenong towards Watergardens or Sunbury via Metro Tunnel	Cranbourne line	Merinda Park towards Cranbourne
Track layout
Location

Lynbrook station is a railway station operated by Metro Trains Melbourne on the Cranbourne line, part of the Melbourne rail network. The station serves the south-eastern suburbs of Lynbrook and Lyndhurst, in Melbourne, Victoria, Australia. It opened on 22 April 2012.

== History ==
Lyndhurst had existed as a train station on the South Gippsland line just north of Lynbrook today. Before trains were withdrew in 1981, this station was served by passenger trains to Leongatha and Yarram. When passenger trains between Melbourne and Leongatha were reinstated in 1984 and up until 1993, Lyndhurst station was already demolished.

The current day Lynbrook station was first announced as part of the Victorian Transport Plan in 2008, with the project being re-announced in the 2010-11 state budget. The plan was to spend $38 million AUD on building new train stations at Williams Landing, Lynbrook and Caroline Springs.

On 9 October 2010, construction of the station officially commenced, when the then Minister for Public Transport, Martin Pakula, turned the first sod. Completion was expected in 2011 but, due to the under-budgeting of the electricity connection to the station, the project stalled.

Lynbrook station then finally opened the year after on the 22nd of April, 2012. In 2022, as part of Level Crossing Removal Project works, the railway track between the station was duplicated as part of the Cranbourne Line upgrade. The duplication allowed an improved timetable for the Cranbourne line, with services operating roughly every 10 minutes during the morning peak.

== Platforms and services ==
Lynbrook has two side platforms and is served by Cranbourne line trains.

Lynbrook platform arrangement
Platform	Line	Destination	Via	Service Type	Notes	Source
1	Cranbourne line	West Footscray, Watergardens or Sunbury	Town Hall	Limited express		
1	Cranbourne line	Dandenong		All stations	Night Network shuttle.	
2	Cranbourne line	Cranbourne		All stations		

== Transport links ==
Cranbourne Transit operates three bus routes to and from Lynbrook station, under contract to Public Transport Victoria:

- 890 : to Dandenong station
- 891 : to Westfield Fountain Gate
- 897 : to Clyde
