= Merinda Park railway station =

Railway station in Melbourne, Australia

Merinda Park
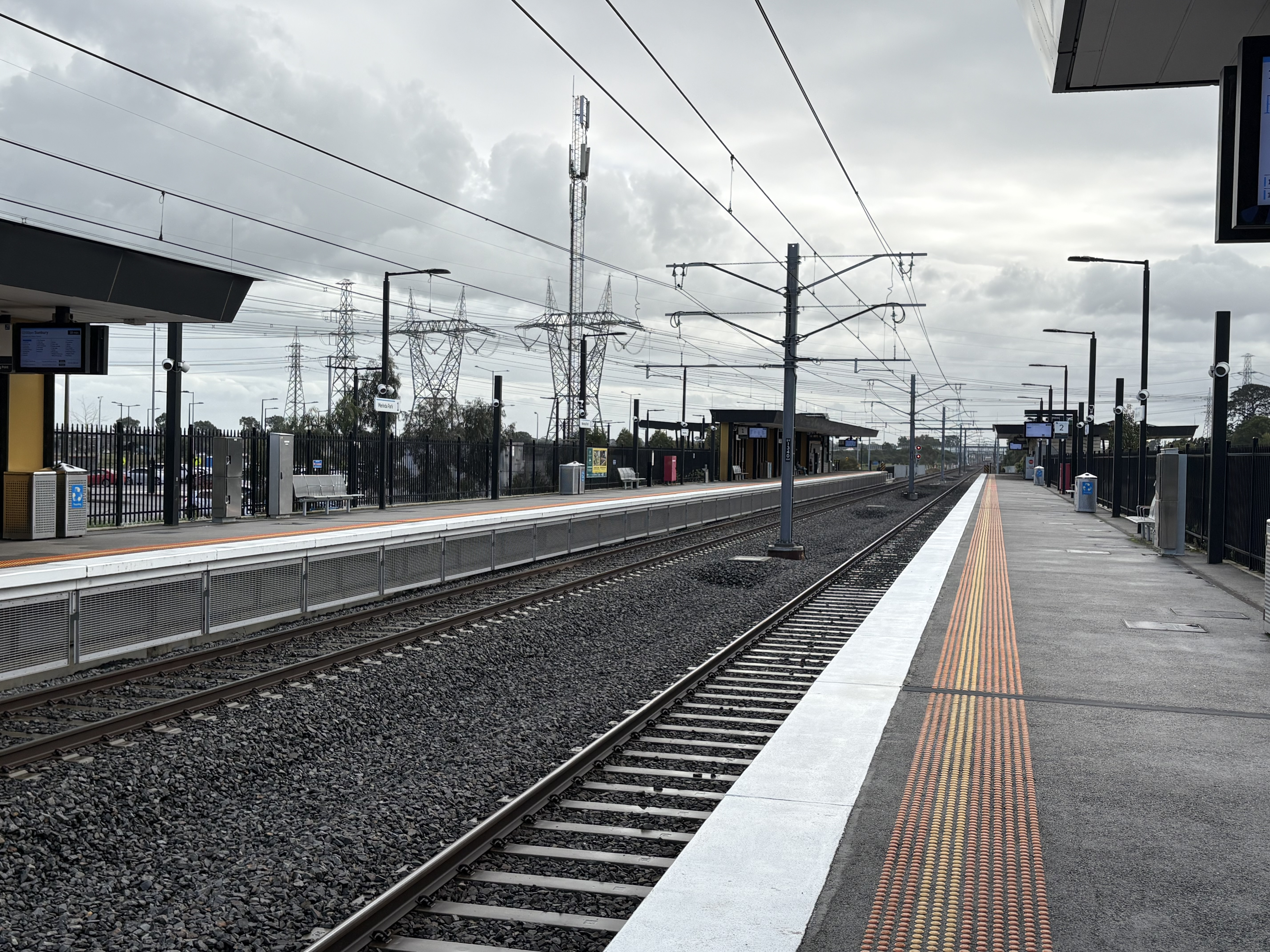
- Northbound view from Platform 2, June 2026

General information
- Location: Endeavour Drive, Cranbourne North, Victoria 3977; City of Casey; Australia
- Coordinates: 38°04′48″S 145°15′51″E
- System: PTV commuter rail station
- Owner: VicTrack
- Operator: Metro Trains
- Line: Cranbourne
- Distance: 42.35 kilometres from Southern Cross
- Platforms: 2 side
- Tracks: 2
- Connections: Bus

Construction
- Structure type: At-grade
- Parking: 204
- Accessible: Yes — step-free access

Other information
- Status: Operational, unstaffed
- Station code: MPK
- Fare zone: Myki zone 2
- Website: Public Transport Victoria

History
- Opened: 24 March 1995; 31 years ago
- Rebuilt: 13 February 2022 (LXRP)
- Electrified: March 1995 (1500 V DC overhead)

Passengers
- 2005–2006: 146,634
- 2006–2007: 188,659 ▲28.66%
- 2007–2008: 271,361 ▲43.83%
- 2008–2009: 299,296 ▲10.29%
- 2009–2010: 329,995 ▲10.25%
- 2010–2011: 354,491 ▲7.42%
- 2011–2012: 311,688 ▼12.07%
- 2012–2013: Not measured
- 2013–2014: 312,227 ▲0.17%
- 2014–2015: 343,791 ▲10.1%
- 2015–2016: 388,318 ▲12.95%
- 2016–2017: 390,063 ▲0.44%
- 2017–2018: 312,186 ▼19.96%
- 2018–2019: 306,964 ▼1.67%
- 2019–2020: 301,600 ▼1.74%
- 2020–2021: 126,750 ▼57.97%
- 2021–2022: 183,900 ▲45.08%
- 2022–2023: 397,700 ▲116.25%

Services
Preceding station	Metro Trains	Following station
Lynbrook towards Watergardens or Sunbury via Metro Tunnel	Cranbourne line	Cranbourne Terminus
Track layout
Location

Merinda Park station is a railway station operated by Metro Trains Melbourne on the Cranbourne line, part of the Melbourne rail network. It serves the eastern suburb of Cranbourne North, in Melbourne, Victoria, Australia, and opened on 24 March 1995. The original station was built with a double platform, designed with a future duplication in mind. A fence ran alongside the unused platform. Instead, the station was rebuilt and the current station was opened in February 2022.

== History ==
Merinda Park station opened as part of the electrification of the line to Cranbourne. The station is named after an adjacent housing estate, opened in the 1980s.

In 1977, flashing light signals were provided at the former Thompsons Road level crossing, which was located in the down direction from the station. In 1995, boom barriers were provided at the crossing in conjunction with the electrification project. On 25 June 2018, the level crossing was eliminated as part of the Level Crossing Removal Project.

In December 2019, the Level Crossing Removal Project announced that the station would be completely rebuilt as part of the Cranbourne line duplication. A second platform was added, and the main entrance moved to a more central location. On 18 March 2021, part of the new station opened, with the remainder completed by 13 February 2022. The duplication allowed an improved timetable for the Cranbourne line, with services operating roughly every 10 minutes during the morning peak.

== Platforms and services ==
Merinda Park has two side platforms and is served by Cranbourne line trains.

Merinda Park platform arrangement
Platform	Line	Destination	Via	Service Type	Notes	Source
1	Cranbourne line	West Footscray, Watergardens or Sunbury	Town Hall	Limited express		
1	Cranbourne line	Dandenong		All stations	Night Network shuttle.	
2	Cranbourne line	Cranbourne		All stations		

== Transport links ==
Cranbourne Transit operates two bus routes to and from Merinda Park station, under contract to Public Transport Victoria:

- 799 : to The Avenue Village Shopping Centre (Cranbourne North)
- 881 : to Clyde North

Ventura Bus Lines operates one route via Merinda Park station, under contract to Public Transport Victoria:

- 863 : Endeavour Hills Shopping Centre – Cranbourne West
