= Noble Park railway station =

Railway station in Melbourne, Australia

Noble Park
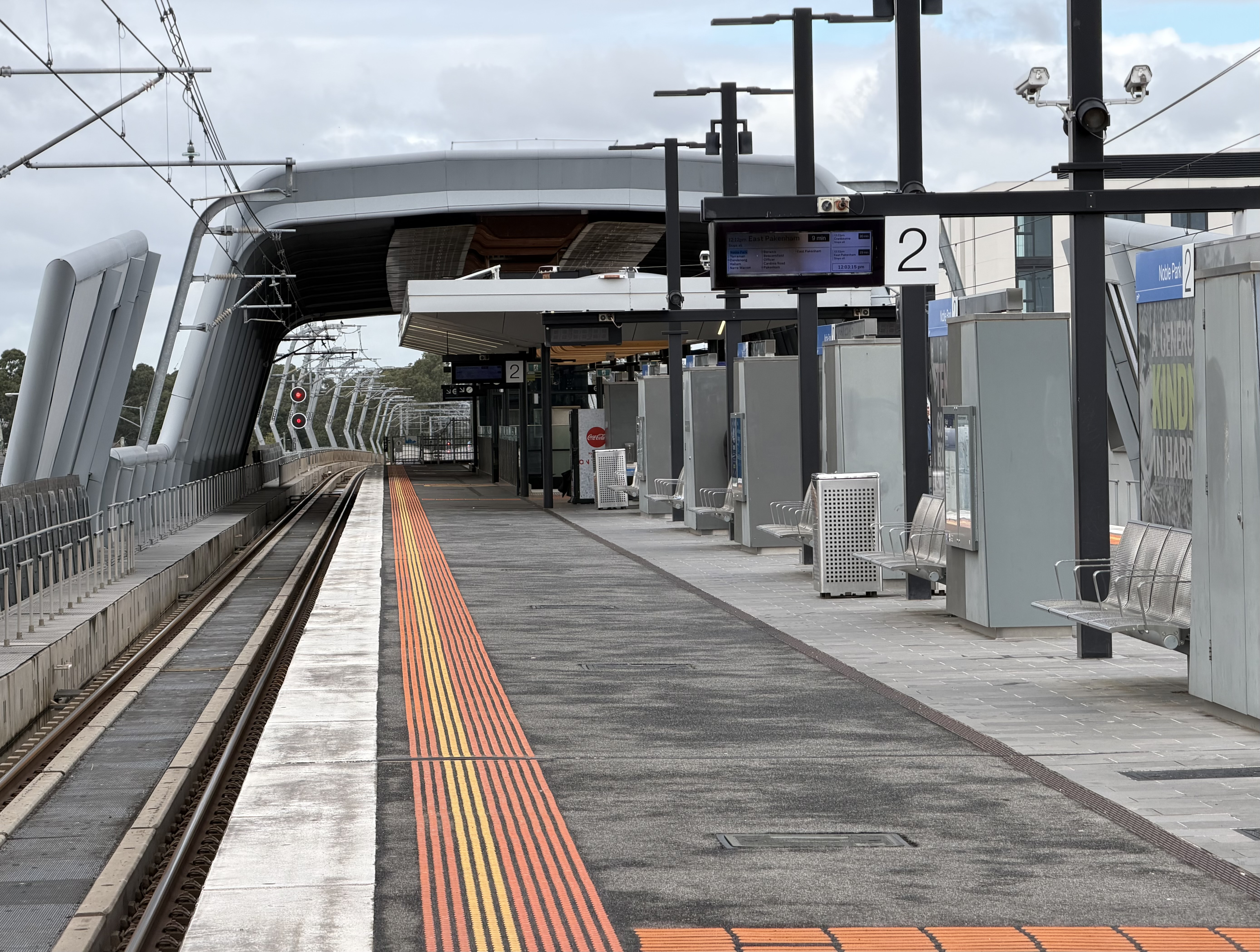
- South-east bound view from Platform 2, June 2026

General information
- Location: Douglas Street, Noble Park, Victoria 3174; City of Greater Dandenong; Australia
- Coordinates: 37°58′03″S 145°10′38″E
- System: PTV commuter rail station
- Owner: VicTrack
- Operator: Metro Trains
- Lines: Cranbourne; Pakenham
- Distance: 27.38 kilometres from Southern Cross
- Platforms: 2 (1 island)
- Tracks: 2
- Connections: Bus

Construction
- Structure type: Elevated
- Parking: 350 spaces
- Cycle facilities: 18 racks
- Accessible: Yes — step free access

Other information
- Status: Operational, premium station
- Station code: NPK
- Fare zone: Myki zone 2
- Website: Public Transport Victoria

History
- Opened: 3 February 1913; 113 years ago
- Rebuilt: 1972; 15 February 2018 (LXRP)
- Electrified: December 1922 (1500 V DC overhead)

Passengers
- 2005–2006: 877,987
- 2006–2007: 1,059,549 ▲20.67%
- 2007–2008: 1,491,737 ▲40.79%
- 2008–2009: 1,457,460 ▼2.29%
- 2009–2010: 1,657,215 ▲13.7%
- 2010–2011: 1,665,435 ▲0.49%
- 2011–2012: 1,577,640 ▼5.27%
- 2012–2013: Not measured
- 2013–2014: 1,058,572 ▼32.9%
- 2014–2015: 1,048,635 ▼0.93%
- 2015–2016: 1,169,211 ▲11.49%
- 2016–2017: 1,059,958 ▼9.34%
- 2017–2018: 876,855 ▼17.27%
- 2018–2019: 929,884 ▲6.04%
- 2019–2020: 868,350 ▼6.61%
- 2020–2021: 513,650 ▼40.84%
- 2021–2022: 556,700 ▲8.38%
- 2022–2023: 816,200 ▲46.61%

Services
Preceding station	Metro Trains	Following station
Sandown Park towards Watergardens or Sunbury via Metro Tunnel	Cranbourne line	Yarraman towards Cranbourne or East Pakenham
Sandown Park towards Watergardens or Sunbury via Metro Tunnel	Pakenham line	Yarraman towards Cranbourne or East Pakenham
Track layout
Location

Noble Park station is a railway station operated by Metro Trains Melbourne on the Pakenham and Cranbourne lines, both part of the Melbourne rail network. It serves the south-eastern suburb of Noble Park, in Melbourne, Victoria, Australia. Noble Park station is an elevated premium station, with an island platform. It opened on 3 February 1913, with the current station provided in February 2018.

== History ==
Noble Park station, like the suburb itself, is named after Noble Buckley, the son of Allan Buckley, who is recognised as the founder of the suburb.

In 1927, the station was closed to goods traffic. In 1954, flashing light signals were provided at the former Heatherton Road level crossing, which was located near the station in the up direction.

In 1972, new ground-level station buildings were provided, after the original station building on Platform 1 had been destroyed by an arsonist on 22 August 1970. In 1977, boom barriers were provided at the former Heatherton Road level crossing.

In 2007, minor upgrade works were carried out to the station as part of the EastLink toll road project. The upgrades including improved shelter, car parking and better security, including brighter lighting and better CCTV coverage.

In September 2007, Sudanese Australian Liep Gony was murdered near Noble Park station by two white men, one of whom had previously expressed the desire to kill a black man. The murder sparked a media and political storm about so-called African gangs.

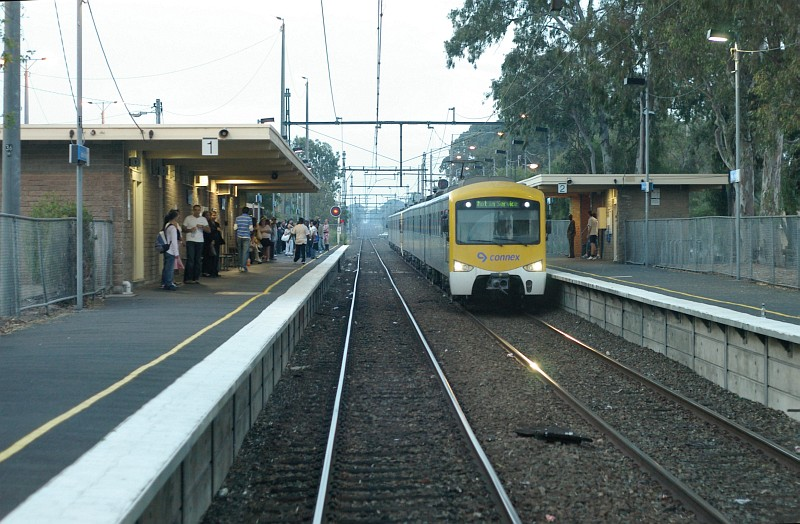
The station prior to its rebuild in July 2009

In 2015, the Level Crossing Removal Project announced the grade separation of the Heatherton Road level crossing, with construction beginning in 2016. The final scheme involved elevating the line over Corrigan, Heatherton and Chandler Roads and included a new high-level station, which opened on 15 February 2018. A row of shops now occupies the site of the former ground-level station buildings.

== Platforms and services ==
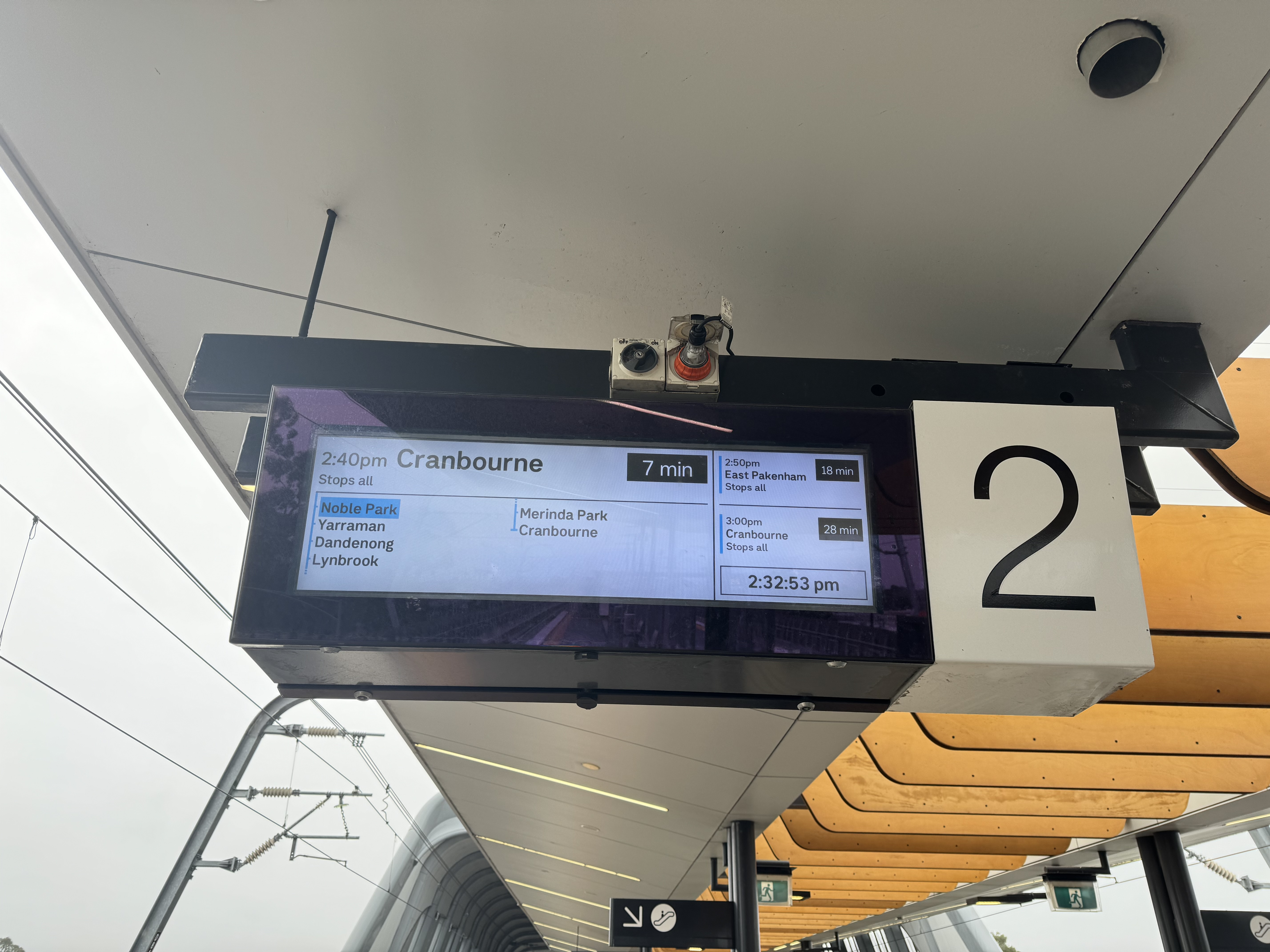
A PID on Platform 2 displaying a Cranbourne-bound service, October 2024

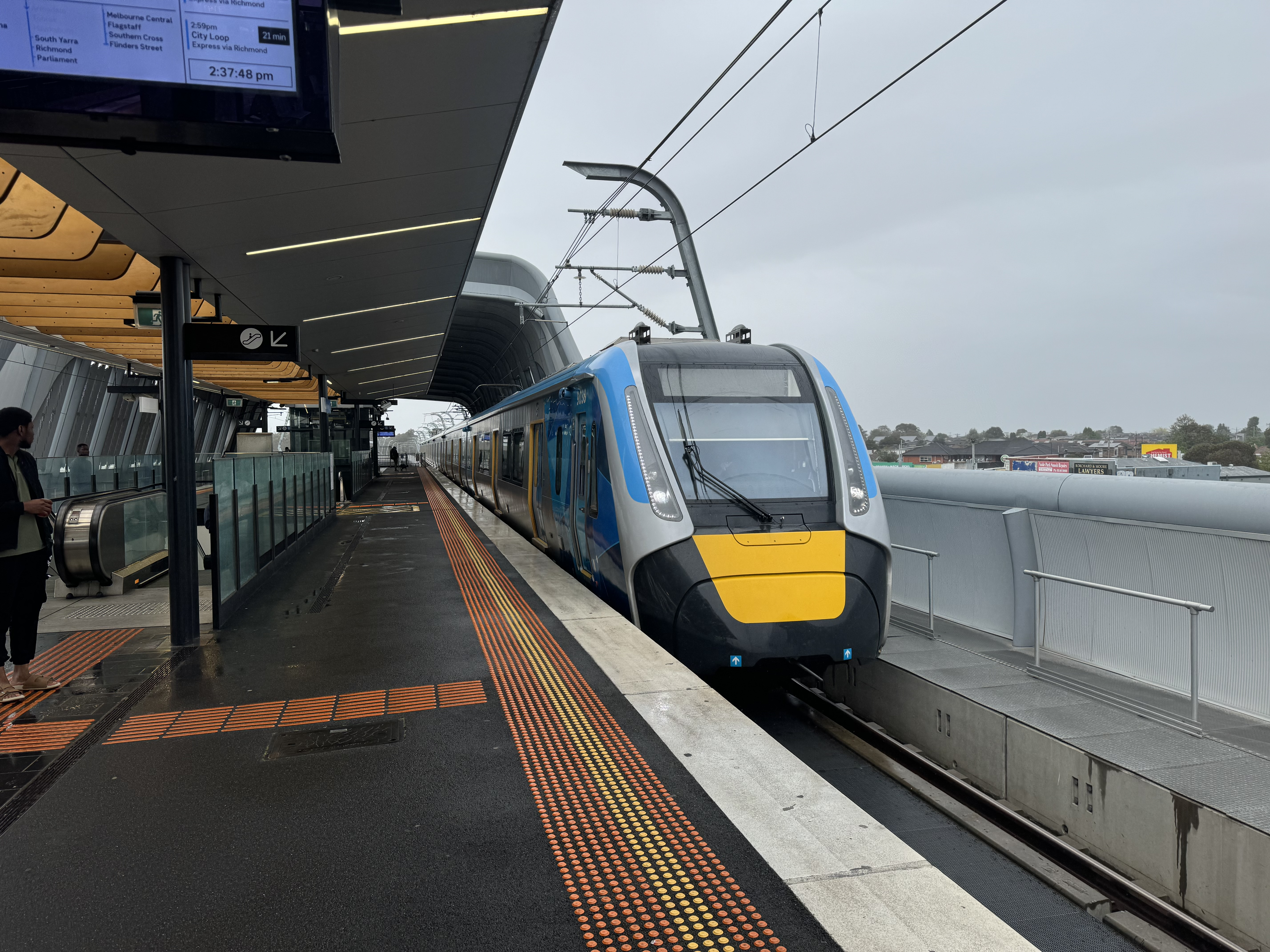
A High Capacity Metro Train on a Flinders Street via City Loop-bound service arrives at Platform 1, October 2024

Noble Park has one island platform with two faces. It is served by Cranbourne and Pakenham line trains.

Noble Park platform arrangement
Platform	Line	Destination	Via	Service Type	Source
1	Cranbourne line Pakenham line	Sunbury, West Footscray, Watergardens	Town Hall	Limited express	
2	Cranbourne line Pakenham line	East Pakenham, Cranbourne, Dandenong		All stations	

== Transport links ==
Ventura Bus Lines operates three routes via Noble Park station, under contract to Public Transport Victoria:

- 709 : to Mordialloc station
- 811 : Dandenong station – Brighton
- 816 : to Keysborough South

Noble Park station is connected to the Djerring Trail (Caulfield–Dandenong Rail Trail), a shared walking and cycling path, which was completed in 2018. Locked bike storage is also available at the station.

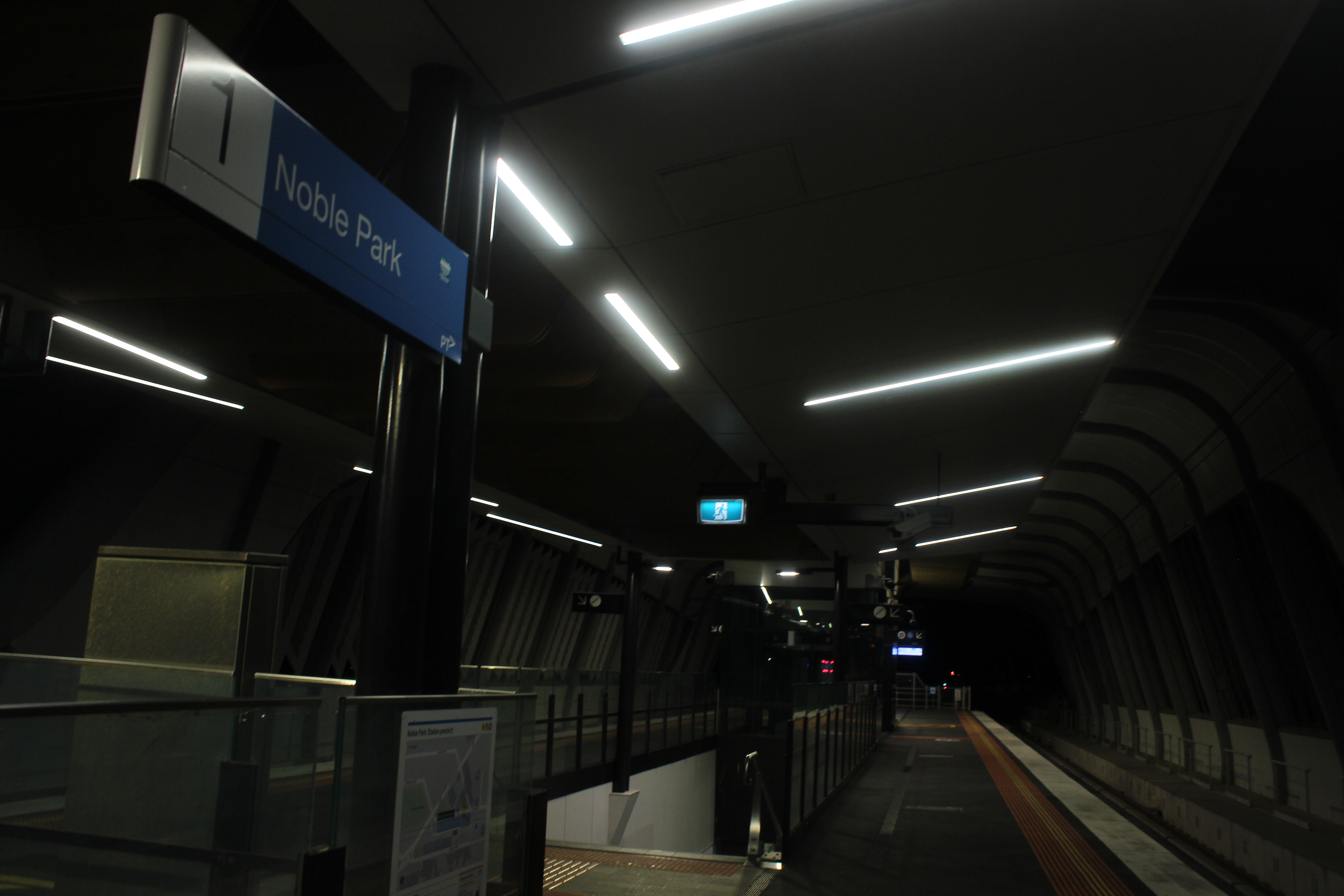
South-east bound view of the island platform, August 2025
