= Yarraman railway station =

Railway station in Melbourne, Australia

Yarraman
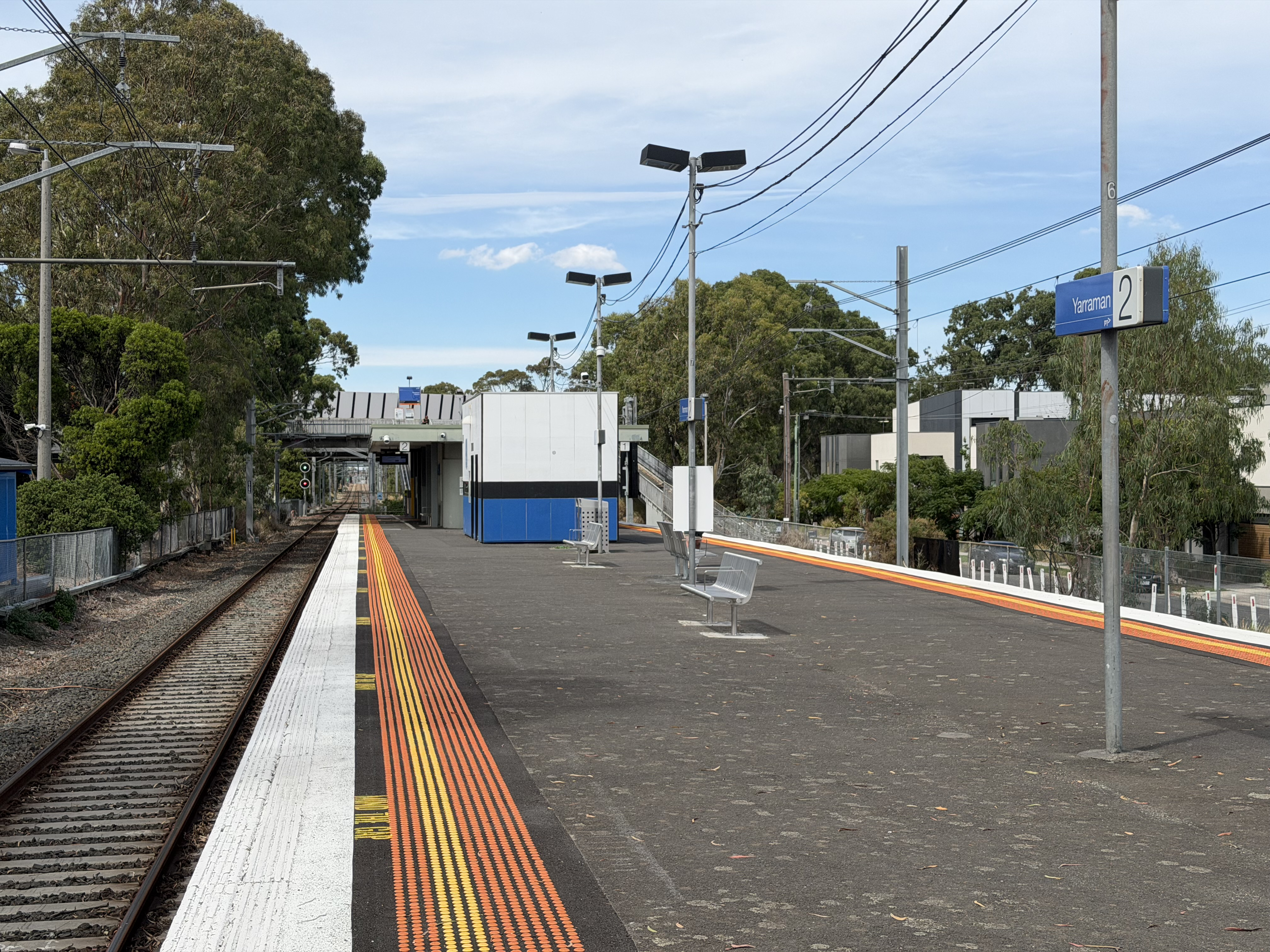
- South-east bound view from Platform 2, February 2026

General information
- Location: Railway Parade, Noble Park, Victoria 3174; City of Greater Dandenong; Australia
- Coordinates: 37°58′41″S 145°11′29″E
- System: PTV commuter rail station
- Owner: VicTrack
- Operator: Metro Trains
- Lines: Cranbourne; Pakenham
- Distance: 29.04 kilometres from Southern Cross
- Platforms: 2 (1 island)
- Tracks: 2
- Connections: Bus

Construction
- Structure type: At-grade
- Parking: 255 spaces
- Cycle facilities: Yes
- Accessible: No — steep ramp

Other information
- Status: Operational, unstaffed
- Station code: YMN
- Fare zone: Myki zone 2
- Website: Public Transport Victoria

History
- Opened: 21 December 1976; 49 years ago
- Electrified: December 1922 (1500 V DC overhead)

Passengers
- 2005–2006: 163,691
- 2006–2007: 217,005 ▲32.57%
- 2007–2008: 308,847 ▲42.32%
- 2008–2009: 336,235 ▲8.86%
- 2009–2010: 337,991 ▲0.52%
- 2010–2011: 325,545 ▼3.68%
- 2011–2012: 305,602 ▼6.12%
- 2012–2013: Not measured
- 2013–2014: 281,349 ▼7.93%
- 2014–2015: 302,532 ▲7.52%
- 2015–2016: 341,602 ▲12.91%
- 2016–2017: 326,785 ▼4.33%
- 2017–2018: 284,084 ▼13.06%
- 2018–2019: 302,072 ▲6.33%
- 2019–2020: 283,350 ▼6.19%
- 2020–2021: 158,500 ▼44.06%
- 2021–2022: 140,000 ▼11.67%
- 2022–2023: 210,350 ▲50.25%

Services
Preceding station	Metro Trains	Following station
Noble Park towards Watergardens or Sunbury via Metro Tunnel	Cranbourne line	Dandenong towards Cranbourne or East Pakenham
Noble Park towards Watergardens or Sunbury via Metro Tunnel	Pakenham line	Dandenong towards Cranbourne or East Pakenham
Track layout
Location

Yarraman station is a railway station operated by Metro Trains Melbourne on the Pakenham and Cranbourne lines, both part of the Melbourne rail network. It serves the suburb of south-eastern suburb of Noble Park in Melbourne, Victoria, Australia, about 27 km (17 mi) from the Melbourne CBD.

Opened on 21 December 1976, the station is named after the nearby Yarraman Creek, a first-order tributary of the lower Dandenong Creek/Patterson River system that serves as Noble Park's eastern boundary with the neighboring suburb of Dandenong. The EastLink toll road is located just 80 m (87 yd) east of the station platform, crossing the line via an overpass. The EastLink Trail, which follows the tollway, uses the entrance footbridge of the station to traverse the railway.

== History ==
To allow for the construction of the station, the existing up double track was slewed in 1974. At the time, "Fotheringham", was suggested by locals as a name for the station, to recognise a notable family in the area.

In 2015, the Level Crossing Removal Project announced the grade separation of the nearby Chandler Road level crossing. Construction began in 2016, with the level crossing removed and a railway overpass built over the road by 2018.

Unlike many stations between Noble Park and Caulfield that were elevated on viaducts as part of the Level Crossing Removal Project, the tracks between Dandenong and Noble Park remained largely at ground level. Yarraman station was not rebuilt because it is over 500 metres away from the Chandler Road viaduct.

== Platforms and services ==
Yarraman station has one island platform with two faces, and is accessible only via a ramped elevated footbridge at its down (south-eastern) end. It is served by Cranbourne and Pakenham line trains.

V/Line services on the Traralgon and Bairnsdale line do not stop here.

Yarraman platform arrangement
Platform	Line	Destination	Via	Service Type	Source
1	Cranbourne line Pakenham line	Sunbury, West Footscray, Watergardens	Town Hall	Limited express	
2	Cranbourne line Pakenham line	East Pakenham, Cranbourne, Dandenong		All stations	

== Transport links ==
Ventura Bus Lines operates two routes via Yarraman station, under contract to Public Transport Victoria:

- 812 : Dandenong station – Brighton
- 813 : Dandenong station – Waverley Gardens Shopping Centre
