= Lyndhurst railway station =

Former railway station in Victoria, Australia

Lyndhurst

General information
- Coordinates: 38°02′47″S 145°14′38″E
- System: Closed commuter rail station
- Line: Cranbourne
- Distance: 38.36 kilometres from Southern Cross
- Platforms: 1
- Tracks: 2

Other information
- Status: Demolished
- Station code: LYN

History
- Opened: 1888; 138 years ago
- Closed: 1981; 45 years ago

Former services
Preceding station	VicRail	Following station
Dandenong towards Spencer Street	South Gippsland line	Cranbourne towards Yarram
Track layout
Location

Lyndhurst was a railway station on the South Gippsland line (now the Cranbourne line) in Victoria, Australia. It was situated just north of the Lyndhurst Road (now Western Port Highway) level crossing. In 1979, it had a single platform on the east side of the track, and a loop siding.

The station was served by passenger trains to Leongatha and Yarram until their withdrawal in June 1981, and then by Dandenong to Lang Lang railmotors until their withdrawal in October 1981. Although passenger train services between Melbourne and Leongatha were restored between 1984 and 1993, Lyndhurst station was not re-opened. The platform has been demolished.

In the 1969 Melbourne Transportation Plan, a new passenger rail line was proposed linking Frankston and Lyndhurst.

Cement traffic from Waurn Ponds near Geelong, to a siding serving a concrete batching plant operated by Boral, ended in 2009, after Pacific National increased the costs charged to Blue Circle Southern. The siding and silo were removed in 2021 to make way for the duplication of the Cranbourne line.
