= Westall railway station =

Railway station in Melbourne, Australia

Westall
- North-west bound view from Platform 2, September 2026

General information
- Location: Rayhur Street, Clayton South, Victoria 3169; City of Kingston; Australia
- Coordinates: 37°56′18″S 145°08′18″E
- System: PTV commuter rail station
- Owner: VicTrack
- Operator: Metro Trains
- Lines: Cranbourne; Pakenham
- Distance: 22.64 kilometres from Southern Cross
- Platforms: 3 (1 island, 1 side)
- Tracks: 3
- Connections: Bus

Construction
- Structure type: At-grade
- Parking: 170 spaces
- Cycle facilities: Yes
- Accessible: Yes—step free access

Other information
- Status: Operational, premium station
- Station code: WTL
- Fare zone: Myki zone 2
- Website: Public Transport Victoria

History
- Opened: 6 February 1951; 75 years ago
- Rebuilt: 11 October 2010
- Electrified: December 1922 (1500 V DC overhead)

Passengers
- 2005–2006: 328,908
- 2006–2007: 259,825 ▼20.99%
- 2007–2008: 413,295 ▲59.05%
- 2008–2009: 532,591 ▲28.86%
- 2009–2010: 531,782 ▼0.15%
- 2010–2011: 472,518 ▼11.14%
- 2011–2012: 538,259 ▲13.91%
- 2012–2013: Not measured
- 2013–2014: 591,264 ▲9.84%
- 2014–2015: 572,540 ▼3.16%
- 2015–2016: 681,926 ▲19.1%
- 2016–2017: 705,592 ▲3.47%
- 2017–2018: 941,057 ▲33.37%
- 2018–2019: 894,238 ▼4.97%
- 2019–2020: 676,550 ▼24.34%
- 2020–2021: 339,550 ▼49.81%
- 2021–2022: 474,400 ▲39.71%

Services
Preceding station	Metro Trains	Following station
Clayton towards Watergardens or Sunbury via Metro Tunnel	Cranbourne line	Springvale towards Cranbourne or East Pakenham
Clayton towards Watergardens or Sunbury via Metro Tunnel	Pakenham line	Springvale towards Cranbourne or East Pakenham
Track layout
Location

Westall station is a railway station operated by Metro Trains Melbourne on the Pakenham and Cranbourne lines, both part of the Melbourne rail network. It serves the south-eastern suburb of Clayton South, in Melbourne, Victoria, Australia. Westall station originally comprised two workers-only platforms for staff at the adjacent Martin & King railway coach-building factory. On 1 June 1959, it became available to the general public, and all services began stopping there.

== Station opening dates ==
The station was first listed as available to passengers in the week up to 2 January 1951, with platforms provided from 6 February only for employees of the adjacent Martin and King factory. In the week ending 2 March 1954 employees of Jaques Bros. Ltd. were also permitted to use the station, and about three months later the same provision was made for employees of Humes Ltd and Concrete Constructions Pty Ltd. The station was made fully available to all passengers from 1 June 1959. Dornan (1979) says the station opened 16 October 1954. The current station was provided in 2010.

The station, like the locality itself, gets its name from an early market garden proprietor who lived in the area.

== History ==
=== Station facilities ===
On 19 July 1975, the timber station building on Platform 1 was damaged by fire.

By mid-1985 a pedestrian crossing, with small scale boom barriers, had been provided at the Down end of the platforms across the trailing crossover.

On 26 July 2006, a fire in the waiting room on Platform 1 caused major damage to half the station building, the ticket machines, seats and a section of the platform. The city-bound platform was closed off and passenger services to Flinders Street operated express from Springvale to Clayton, bypassing Westall, until temporary fencing was placed around the building. The damaged section was subsequently demolished and rebuilt.

In May 2008, the Victorian State Government announced that the Westall station precinct would receive a $151 million upgrade, which included a rebuilt station, a new third platform, a third 2.6-kilometre track between Centre Road and Springvale Road and additional storage space at the Westall stabling yard. Work commenced in January 2010, with the majority of it completed by October of that year. Following those works, Westall was upgraded to a Premium Station.

The new platform however was not used in regular operation until a new timetable for the Pakenham and Cranbourne lines took effect in May 2011.

=== Track and signals ===
The original Westall Road level crossing was provided in the week ending 24 August 1914.

The station had a goods yard located at its eastern end, as well as a number of industrial sidings serving nearby factories.

The first sidings were provided in 1950. The station at the site was provided in 1951 for factory workers, and in 1959 to the general public. At that time a caretaker was provided.

The first interlocking was provided in February 1951 to control access to the sidings, with three Down signals and one Up signal. The section Clayton-Springvale was divided at Westall for Down trains only, allowing closer headways, while in the Up direction the signal box only acted as a repeating station from Springvale. In 1954 the sidings for Martin and King's factory were extended 195 feet (59 m) and 45 feet (14 m).

Additional sidings were provided in 1960, with three extra signals in the Up direction and the section Springvale to Clayton divided at Westall, mirroring the Down direction. In 1961 the Martin and King siding was renamed Volkswagen (Australia) Pty Ltd Siding. A through goods siding was provided linking Westall to Springvale along the north side of the alignment in 1966, which could be used as a refuge for empty briquette trains returning to the Latrobe Valley and Yallourn. At this time a public siding was also provided. Shortly thereafter the arrival-side Home signals were moved further out. By 1967 additional sidings were provided for the State Electricity Commission. By this time the station had a fully-interlocked 35 lever frame, with 18 levers (1-2, 10-15, 19-21, 29-35) in use.

Resignalling work in the early 1970s included plans for the signal box to be abolished and the station worked from a control panel at Springvale. In mid-1971 the line from Clayton was converted from Double Line Block with Winter's Instruments to three-position automatic signals, and the down side through to Springvale followed in February the next year. The trailing crossover at the down end of the station is absent from the 1971 track diagrams, being replaced by an auxiliary trailing crossover nearer to Springvale, but reappears in 1972.

Further sidings were added in late 1974 for Kimberly-Clark, APM Investments in 1975, and Apex Quarries Pty Ltd. in 1976. A Stationmaster was provided to manage the goods sidings in April 1978. The Volkswagen sidings behind the Down platform were abolished in November 1984, and in March 1985 the level crossing was moved 107 metres in the down direction with minor signalling changes to accommodate the alteration. In 1985, boom barriers were provided at the former Westall Road level crossing, which was at the down end of the station. In 1992 Boxcar Ltd moved operations from the south to north side of the line, taking over the former Bowater Scott sidings and the original site being closed.

On 17 April 1998, the Westall train maintenance centre was officially opened in the former goods yard, as part of the decentralisation of train stabling and maintenance from the former Jolimont Yards. The buildings were approximately 2,850 m^{2} in size, and permitted bogie repair and replacement, under-carriage and overhead work. The work cost $15 million, but that included the cost of another new maintenance facility at Bayswater.

In 2000, the Westall Road level crossing was grade separated, and replaced with a road overpass. By 4 February 2001, the boom barriers at the former level crossing had been decommissioned.

== Platforms and services ==
The station is served by Pakenham and Cranbourne line trains. It has one side platform (Platform 1) and one island platform with two faces (Platforms 2 and 3), linked by a footbridge. Access to the platforms is via stairs and lifts.

The side platform features a customer service window, an enclosed waiting room and toilets, while the island platform features an enclosed waiting room. A number of services terminate at Westall and return to the city.

Westall platform arrangement
Platform	Line	Destination	Via	Service Type	Notes	Source
1	Cranbourne line Pakenham line	Sunbury, Watergardens or West Footscray	Town Hall	Limited express		
2	Cranbourne line Pakenham line	Sunbury, Watergardens or West Footscray	Town Hall	Limited express	Services to Town Hall only use this platform during weekday peaks.	
2	Cranbourne line Pakenham line	East Pakenham, Cranbourne or Dandenong		All stations	Typical platform for services to East Pakenham and Cranbourne.	
3	Cranbourne line Pakenham line	East Pakenham, Cranbourne or Dandenong		All stations	Platform only used during weekday peaks.	

== Transport links ==
Ventura Bus Lines operates two bus routes via Westall station, under contract to Public Transport Victoria:

- 704 : to Oakleigh station
- 824 : Moorabbin station – Parkmore Shopping Centre
