= Beaconsfield railway station, Melbourne =

Railway station in Melbourne, Australia

Beaconsfield
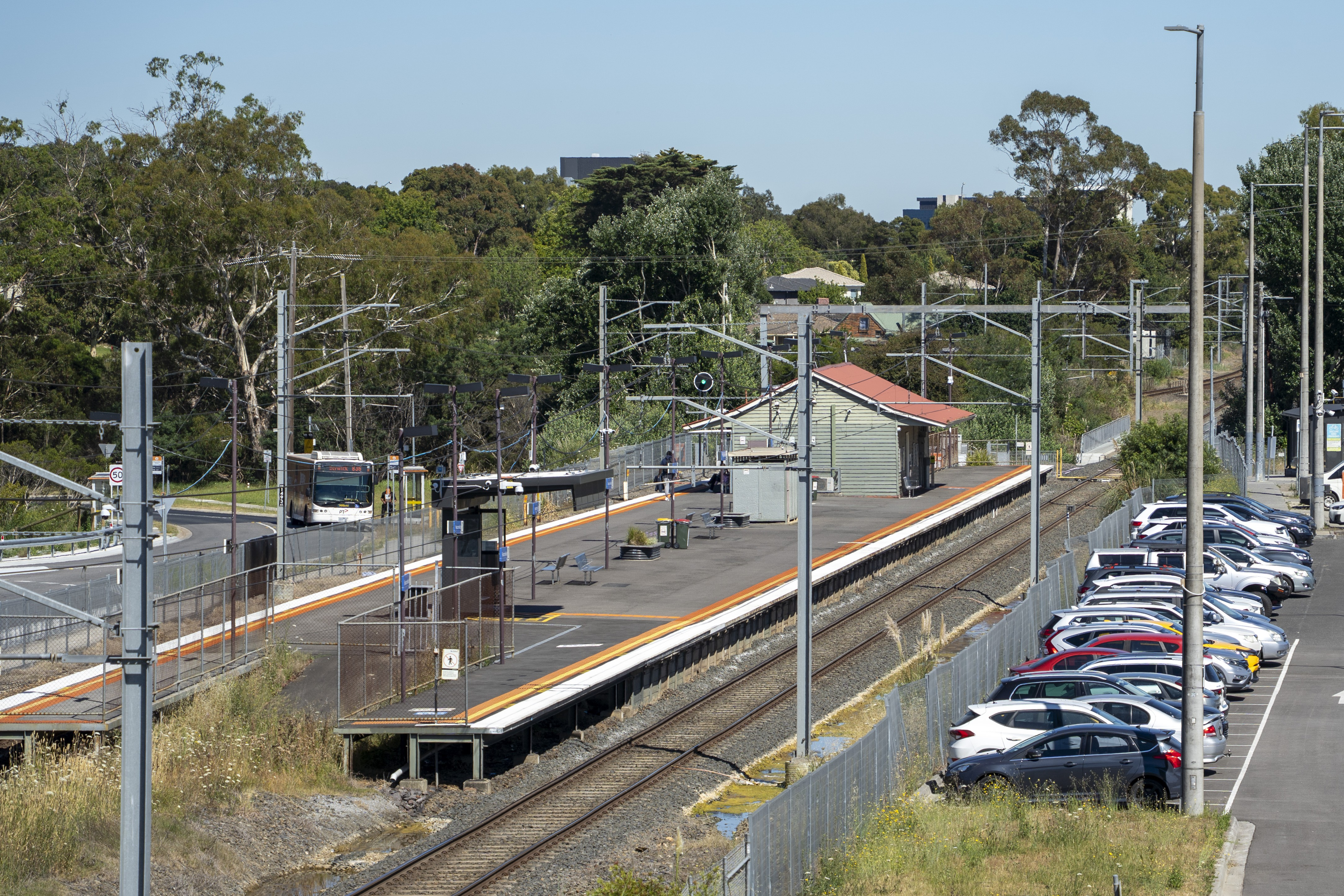
- Eastbound view of the station platforms, January 2026

General information
- Location: Kenilworth Avenue, Beaconsfield, Victoria 3807; Shire of Cardinia; Australia
- Coordinates: 38°03′03″S 145°21′58″E
- System: PTV commuter rail station
- Owner: VicTrack
- Operator: Metro Trains
- Line: Pakenham
- Distance: 46.99 kilometres from Southern Cross
- Platforms: 2 (1 island)
- Tracks: 2
- Connections: Bus

Construction
- Structure type: At-grade
- Parking: 260 spaces
- Cycle facilities: Yes
- Accessible: No — steep ramp

Other information
- Status: Operational, unstaffed
- Station code: BFD
- Fare zone: Myki zone 2
- Website: Public Transport Victoria

History
- Opened: 1 December 1879; 146 years ago
- Electrified: July 1954 (1500 V DC overhead)

Passengers
- 2005–2006: 145,381
- 2006–2007: 167,017 ▲14.88%
- 2007–2008: 193,210 ▲15.68%
- 2008–2009: 226,322 ▲17.13%
- 2009–2010: 237,027 ▲4.73%
- 2010–2011: 236,642 ▼0.16%
- 2011–2012: 239,137 ▲1.05%
- 2012–2013: Not measured
- 2013–2014: 213,051 ▼10.9%
- 2014–2015: 227,724 ▲6.88%
- 2015–2016: 279,817 ▲22.87%
- 2016–2017: 306,721 ▲9.61%
- 2017–2018: 293,840 ▼4.19%
- 2018–2019: 273,329 ▼6.98%
- 2019–2020: 234,200 ▼14.31%
- 2020–2021: 109,600 ▼53.2%
- 2021–2022: 119,350 ▲8.89%
- 2022–2023: 209,400 ▲75.45%
- 2023–2024: 174,000 ▼16.91%
- 2024–2025: 199,950 ▲14.91%

Services
| Preceding station | Metro Trains | Following station |
|---|---|---|
| Berwick towards Watergardens or Sunbury via Metro Tunnel | Pakenham line | Officer towards East Pakenham |
Track layout
Location

Beaconsfield station is a railway station operated by Metro Trains Melbourne on the Pakenham line, part of the Melbourne rail network. It serves the south-eastern suburb of Beaconsfield, in Melbourne, Victoria, Australia. Beaconsfield station is a ground-level unstaffed station, featuring an island platform. It opened on 1 December 1879.

== History ==
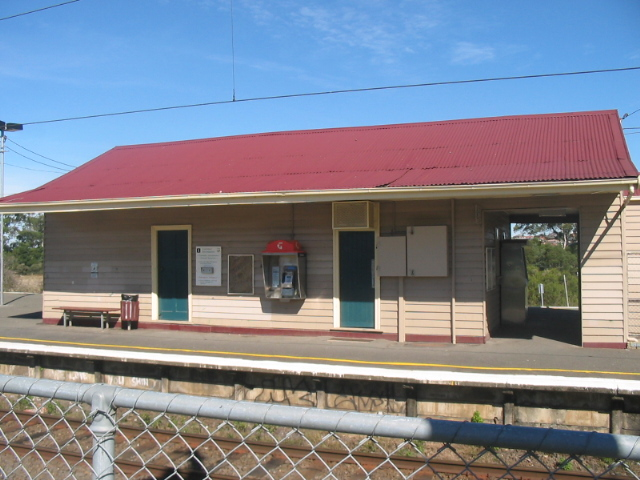
The island station platform building at Beaconsfield in April 2006

Beaconsfield station opened on 1 December 1879, just over two years after the railway line from Dandenong was extended to Pakenham. The station gets its name from statesman Benjamin Disraeli, Earl of Beaconsfield, who was Prime Minister of the United Kingdom between 1874 and 1880.

In 1967, the goods siding was closed to traffic, and was removed later in that same year.

In 1978, flashing light signals were provided at the former Station Street level crossing, which was located nearby in the down direction of the station, with boom barriers provided later on in 1986.

There is a car-park nearby for travellers. In mid December 2020, a further expansion of an additional car-park of 150 spaces was completed on state-owned land. Improved lighting and CCTV was provided, along with a secure bicycle parking shed and extra bicycle stands. More than 250,000 commuters use the station each year.

Under the Level Crossing Removal Project, the Station Street level crossing was grade separated. Major construction started on the project in November 2023, and the new road bridge was opened to traffic on 24 March 2025.

The former railway house at 20 Beaconsfield Avenue was built in 1888 and, in 1900, was acquired for use as a station master's house. It is now a private residence.

== Platforms and services ==
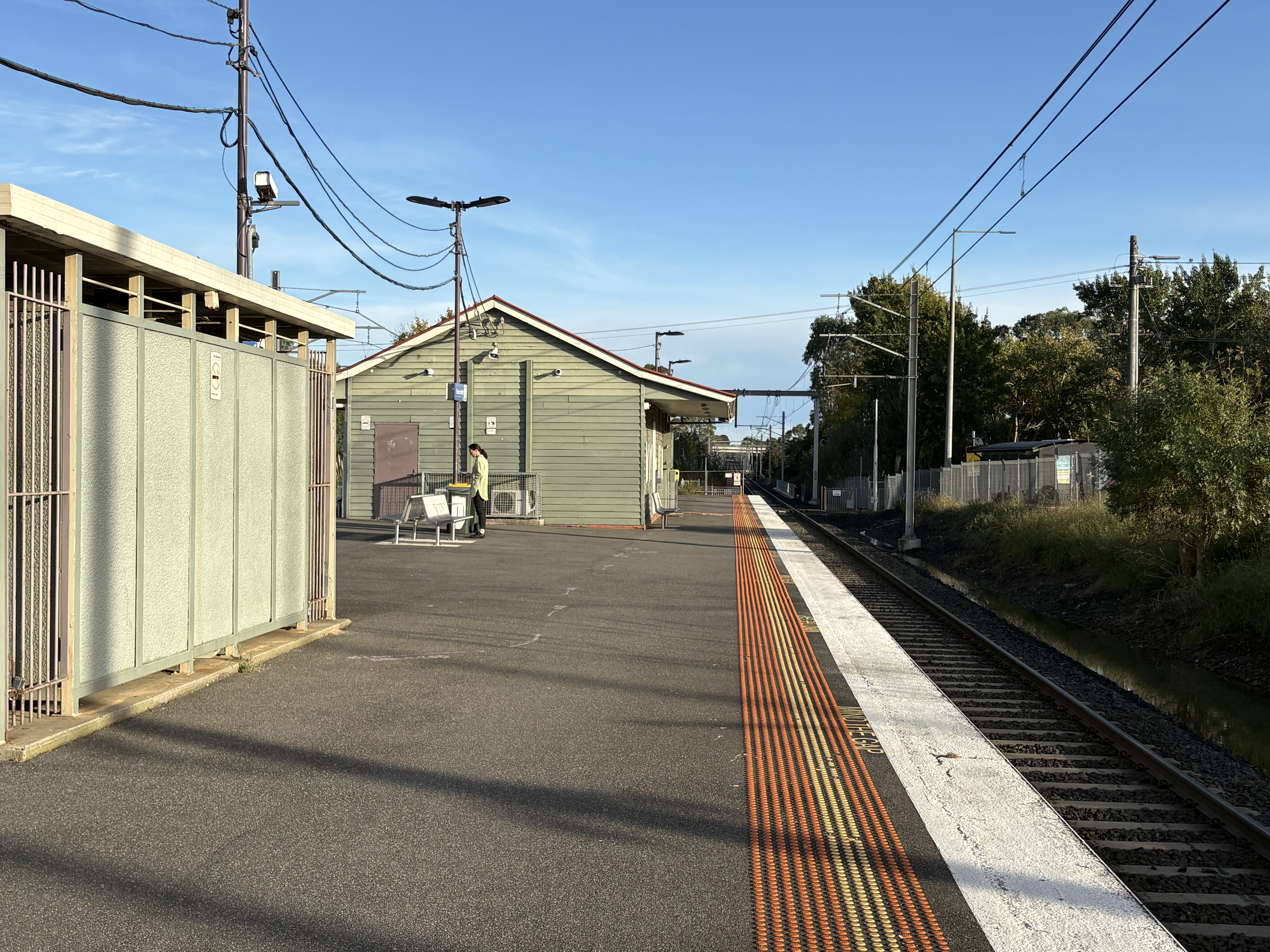
Westbound view from the island platform, May 2026

Beaconsfield has one island platform with two faces. It is located at the corner of Woods Street and Beaconsfield Avenue. From the opposite side of the railway line, it is located along Kenilworth Avenue.

It is serviced by Metro Trains' Pakenham line services.

Beaconsfield platform arrangement
| Platform | Line | Destination | Via | Service Pattern | Source |
|---|---|---|---|---|---|
| 1 | Pakenham line | Sunbury, Watergardens, West Footscray | Town Hall | Limited express | |
| 2 | Pakenham line | East Pakenham | | All stations | |

== Transport links ==
Ventura Bus Lines operates two routes via Beaconsfield station, under contract to Public Transport Victoria:

- 836 : Berwick station – Eden Rise Shopping Centre
- 926 : Pakenham station – Westfield Fountain Gate
- 928 : Pakenham station – Berwick station via Cardinia Road station
