= Sandown Park railway station, Melbourne =

Railway station in Melbourne, Australia

Sandown Park
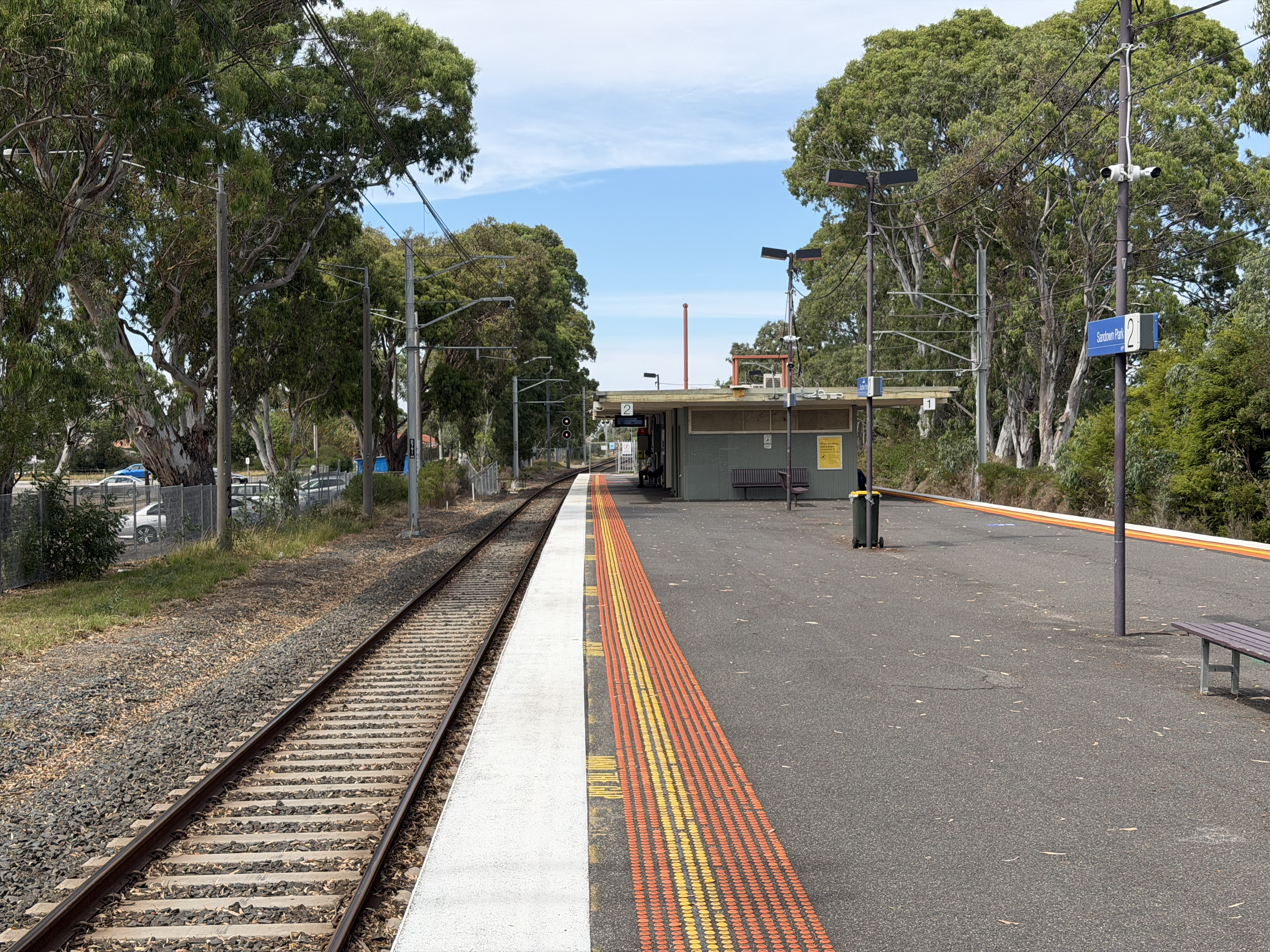
- South-east bound view from Platform 2, February 2026

General information
- Location: Lightwood Road, Springvale, Victoria 3171; City of Greater Dandenong; Australia
- Coordinates: 37°57′24″S 145°09′48″E
- System: PTV commuter rail station
- Owner: VicTrack
- Operator: Metro Trains
- Lines: Cranbourne; Pakenham
- Distance: 25.68 kilometres from Southern Cross
- Platforms: 2 (1 island)
- Tracks: 2

Construction
- Structure type: At-grade
- Parking: 250 spaces
- Cycle facilities: Yes
- Accessible: No — steep ramp

Other information
- Status: Operational, unstaffed
- Station code: SNP
- Fare zone: Myki zone 2
- Website: Public Transport Victoria

History
- Opened: 19 June 1965; 61 years ago
- Electrified: December 1922 (1500 V DC overhead)
- Former names: Oakleigh Racecourse (1889-1892)

Passengers
- 2005–2006: 415,698
- 2006–2007: 466,021 ▲12.1%
- 2007–2008: 455,989 ▼2.15%
- 2008–2009: 404,270 ▼11.34%
- 2009–2010: 440,579 ▲8.98%
- 2010–2011: 443,853 ▲0.74%
- 2011–2012: 411,211 ▼7.35%
- 2012–2013: Not measured
- 2013–2014: 526,464 ▲28.02%
- 2014–2015: 504,513 ▼4.16%
- 2015–2016: 571,573 ▲13.29%
- 2016–2017: 607,300 ▲6.25%
- 2017–2018: 527,513 ▼13.13%
- 2018–2019: 537,382 ▲1.87%
- 2019–2020: 443,950 ▼17.38%
- 2020–2021: 178,800 ▼59.72%
- 2021–2022: 189,600 ▲6.04%
- 2022–2023: 315,850 ▲66.58%

Services
Preceding station	Metro Trains	Following station
Springvale towards Watergardens or Sunbury via Metro Tunnel	Cranbourne line	Noble Park towards Cranbourne or East Pakenham
Springvale towards Watergardens or Sunbury via Metro Tunnel	Pakenham line	Noble Park towards Cranbourne or East Pakenham
Track layout
Location

Sandown Park station is a railway station operated by Metro Trains Melbourne on the Pakenham and Cranbourne lines, both part of the Melbourne rail network. It serves the south-eastern suburb of Springvale, in Melbourne, Victoria, Australia. Sandown Park station is a ground-level unstaffed station, featuring an island platform. It opened 19 June 1965.

== History ==
=== 1889–1955 ===
Sandown Park originally opened on 12 August 1889 as Oakleigh Racecourse. It was renamed Sandown Park in 1892. Named after Sandown Park in Surrey, England, the station was built to service the nearby Sandown Racecourse, and was only used for racecourse traffic.

Upon opening, the station did not feature in any timetables for the Eastern line. By 1892, it was featured in timetables for the first time.

By 1909, in addition to the two main lines, there was a signal box and booking office located at the up end of the station, and two sidings each over 600 metres long on the eastern side of the tracks, for the stabling of special race services. The station had no platform on the up track, instead having an island platform on the down track, with the other face serving one of the sidings on the eastern side.

By 1929, four sidings existed at the down end of the station, parallel to the main lines. In 1937, a crossover at the down end of the station was abolished and, in 1943, three sidings that adjoined the back platform road were abolished. By 1954, the back platform road and the remaining siding were placed out of use. On 16 May 1955, Sandown Park was closed.

=== 1965–present ===
On 19 June 1965, Sandown Park reopened as an island platform, coinciding with the first race day meeting at the adjacent racecourse. Like the first station, it was open for passengers on race days only. On October 4 of that year, it was opened for general passenger traffic.

The station once had a second exit and a pedestrian underpass at the up end of the platform, but that has since been closed and filled in.

Nearby, towards Noble Park, the Corrigan Road level crossing was removed in 2018, as part of the Victorian Government's Level Crossing Removal Project (LXRP).

== Platforms and services ==
Sandown Park has one island platform with two faces. It is serviced by Metro Trains' Cranbourne and Pakenham line services.

Sandown Park platform arrangement
Platform	Line	Destination	Via	Service Type	Source
1	Cranbourne line Pakenham line	Sunbury, West Footscray or Watergardens	Town Hall	Limited express	
2	Cranbourne line Pakenham line	East Pakenham, Cranbourne or Dandenong		All stations	
