= Cardinia Road railway station =

Railway station in Melbourne, Australia

Cardinia Road
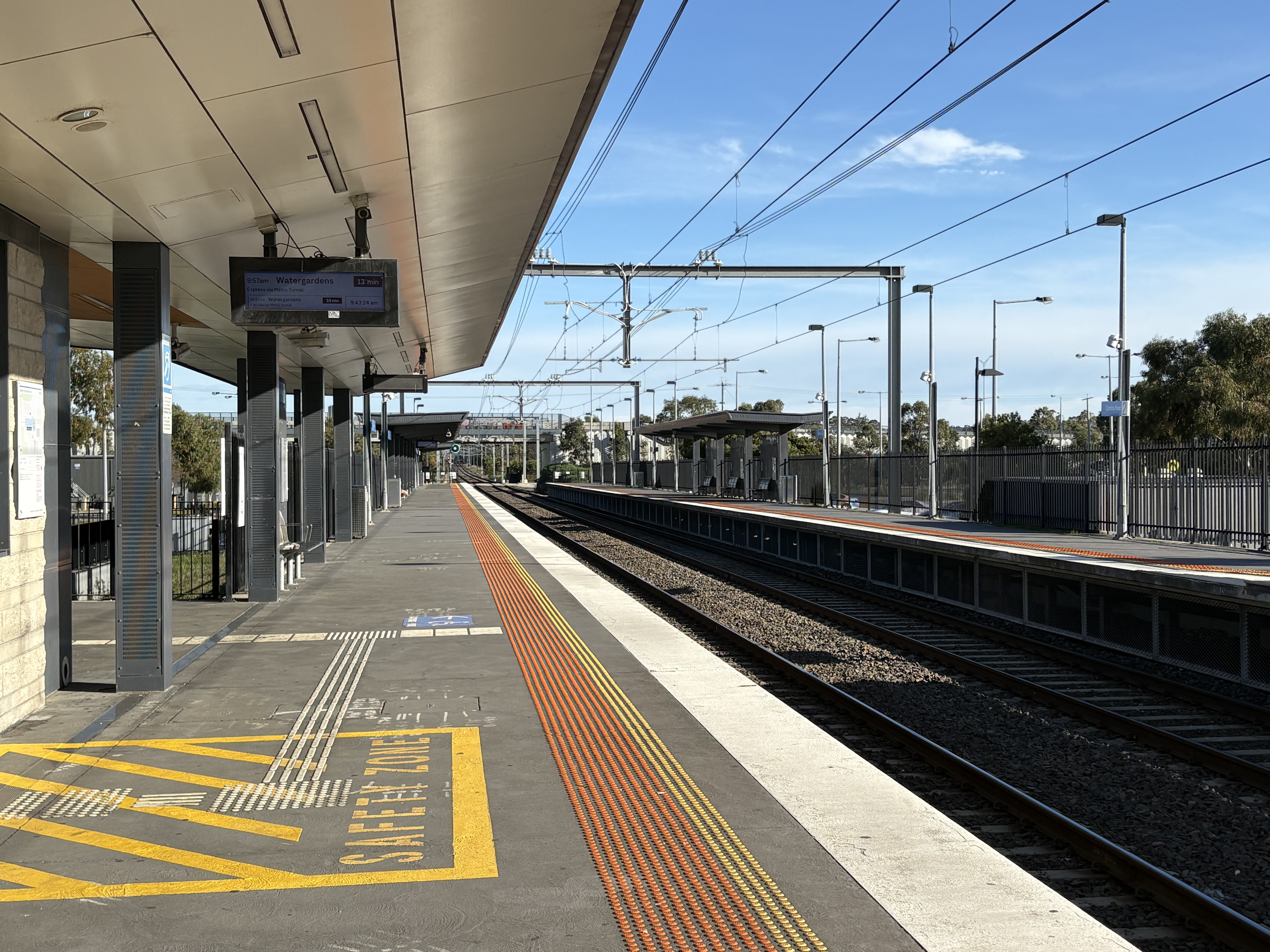
- Westbound view from Platform 1, May 2026

General information
- Location: The Parkway, Pakenham, Victoria 3810; Shire of Cardinia; Australia
- Coordinates: 38°4′16″S 145°26′15″E
- System: PTV commuter rail station
- Owner: VicTrack
- Operator: Metro Trains
- Line: Pakenham
- Distance: 53.68 kilometres from Southern Cross
- Platforms: 2 side
- Tracks: 2
- Connections: Bus

Construction
- Structure type: Ground
- Parking: 450
- Cycle facilities: Yes
- Accessible: Yes—step free access

Other information
- Status: Operational, unstaffed
- Station code: CDA
- Fare zone: Myki zone 2
- Website: Public Transport Victoria

History
- Opened: 22 April 2012; 14 years ago
- Electrified: July 1954 (1500 V DC overhead)

Passengers
- 2011–2012: 34,861
- 2012–2013: Not measured
- 2013–2014: 246,913 ▲608.28%
- 2014–2015: 320,733 ▲29.89%
- 2015–2016: 414,985 ▲29.38%
- 2016–2017: 434,973 ▲4.81%
- 2017–2018: 420,077 ▼3.42%
- 2018–2019: 381,826 ▼9.1%
- 2019–2020: 355,850 ▼6.8%
- 2020–2021: 193,250 ▼45.69%
- 2021–2022: 194,800 ▲0.8%
- 2022–2023: 309,800 ▲59.03%
- 2023–2024: 360,500 ▲16.37%
- 2024–2025: 405,950 ▲12.61%

Services
Preceding station	Metro Trains	Following station
Officer towards Watergardens or Sunbury via Metro Tunnel	Pakenham line	Pakenham towards East Pakenham
Track layout
Location

Cardinia Road station is a railway station operated by Metro Trains Melbourne on the Pakenham line, part of the Melbourne rail network. It serves the south-eastern suburb of Pakenham, in Melbourne, Victoria, Australia. Cardinia Road station is a ground-level unstaffed station, featuring two side platforms. It opened on 22 April 2012.

== History ==
Announced as part of the Victorian Transport Plan in 2008, construction works for the station officially commenced on 11 October 2010, when the then Minister for Public Transport, Martin Pakula, turned the first sod at the site. On 10 June 2011, the name for the station was confirmed as Cardinia Road. On 15 April 2012, a community open day was held prior to opening, with the station officially opening a week later, on 22 April. Due to power supply issues, only selected peak-hour services stopped at the station, with a substation built later on in that year to allow all peak-hour services to stop.

In 1978, flashing light signals were provided at the former Cardinia Road level crossing, which was located at the up end of the station, with boom barriers being installed in 1986. On 6 December 2020, as part of the Level Crossing Removal Project, the level crossing was grade separated, and replaced with a road overpass. In February 2021, the boom barriers, flashing lights and bells were dismantled.

== Platforms and services ==
Cardinia Road has two side platforms. It is served by Pakenham line trains.

Cardinia Road platform arrangement
Platform	Line	Destination	Via	Service Pattern	Source
1	Pakenham line	Sunbury, Watergardens, West Footscray	Town Hall	Limited express	
2	Pakenham line	East Pakenham		All stations	

== Transport links ==
Ventura Bus Lines operates two routes via Cardinia Road station, under contract to Public Transport Victoria:

- 925 : Pakenham station – Officer South (via Cardinia Road Station)
- 926 : Pakenham station – Westfield Fountain Gate
- 928 : Pakenham station – Berwick station (via Cardinia Road Station)
