= Narre Warren railway station =

Railway station in Melbourne, Australia

Narre Warren
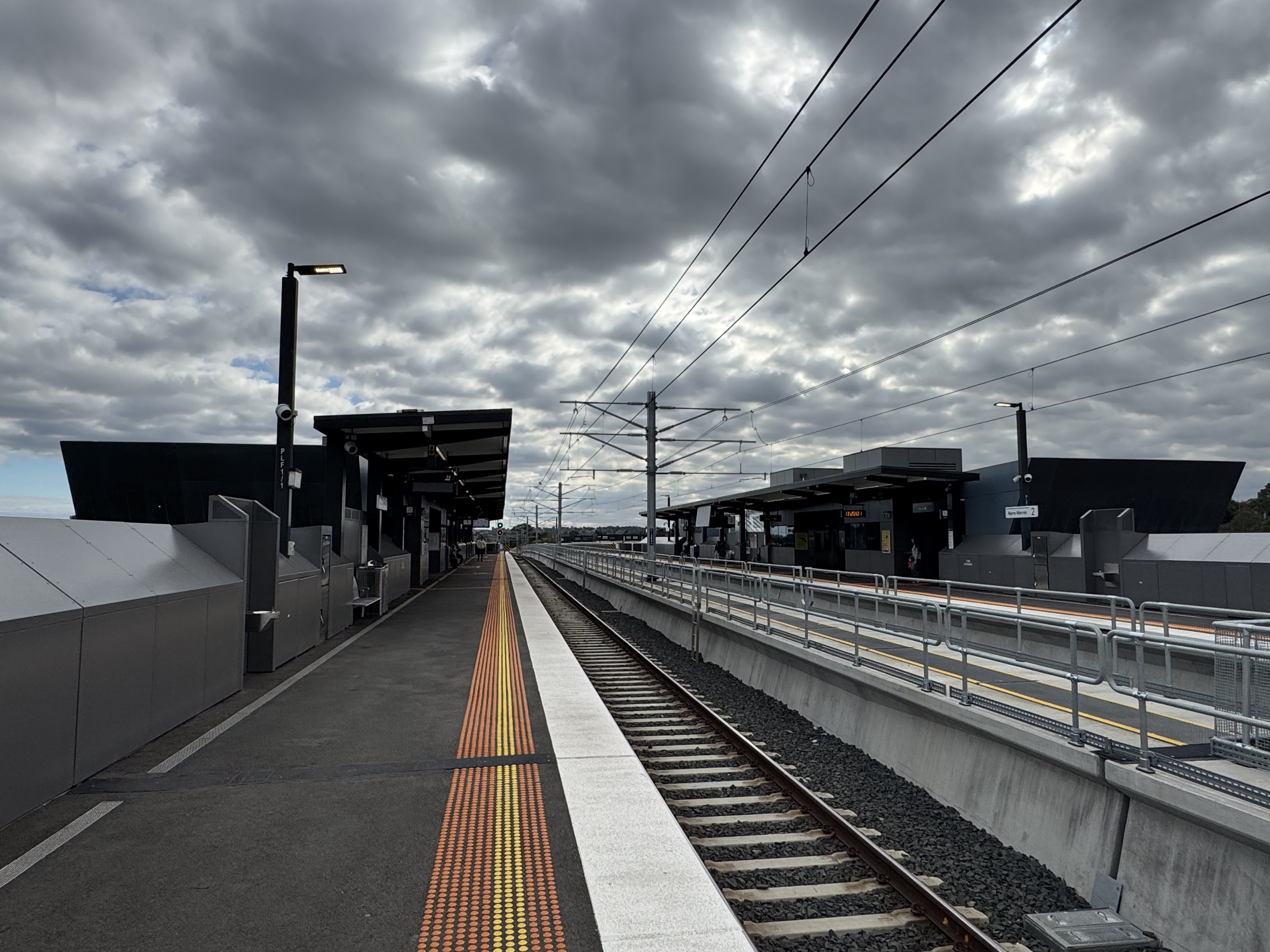
- North-west bound view from Platform 1, May 2025

General information
- Location: Webb Street, Narre Warren, Victoria 3805; City of Casey; Australia
- Coordinates: 38°01′40″S 145°18′14″E
- System: PTV commuter rail station
- Owner: VicTrack
- Operator: Metro Trains
- Line: Pakenham
- Distance: 40.80 kilometres from Southern Cross
- Platforms: 2 side
- Tracks: 2
- Connections: Bus

Construction
- Structure type: Elevated
- Parking: 573 spaces
- Cycle facilities: 10 racks
- Accessible: Yes — step free access

Other information
- Status: Operational, premium station
- Station code: NWA
- Fare zone: Myki zone 2
- Website: Public Transport Victoria

History
- Opened: 10 March 1882; 144 years ago
- Rebuilt: 2 June 1995; 28 March 2024 (LXRP)
- Electrified: July 1954 (1500 V DC overhead)

Passengers
- 2005–2006: 561,247
- 2006–2007: 663,386 ▲18.19%
- 2007–2008: 776,240 ▲17.01%
- 2008–2009: 818,765 ▲5.47%
- 2009–2010: 803,995 ▼1.8%
- 2010–2011: 791,052 ▼1.6%
- 2011–2012: 737,782 ▼6.73%
- 2012–2013: Not measured
- 2013–2014: 785,600 ▲6.48%
- 2014–2015: 788,012 ▲0.3%
- 2015–2016: 856,433 ▲8.68%
- 2016–2017: 847,096 ▼1.09%
- 2017–2018: 733,569 ▼13.4%
- 2018–2019: 658,699 ▼10.2%
- 2019–2020: 587,550 ▼10.8%
- 2020–2021: 309,300 ▼47.35%
- 2021–2022: 318,150 ▲2.86%
- 2022–2023: 429,650 ▲35.04%

Services
Preceding station	Metro Trains	Following station
Hallam towards Watergardens or Sunbury via Metro Tunnel	Pakenham line	Berwick towards East Pakenham
Track layout
Location

Narre Warren station is a railway station operated by Metro Trains Melbourne on the Pakenham line, which is part of the Melbourne rail network. It serves the south-eastern suburb of the same name, in Melbourne, Victoria, Australia.

Narre Warren station is an elevated hybrid premium station, featuring two side platforms. It opened on 10 March 1882, with the current station provided in March 2024.

== History ==
Narre Warren station opened on 10 March 1882 as a single platform, just over four years after the railway line from Dandenong was extended to Pakenham. Like the suburb itself, the station carries the name of an Aboriginal word believed to mean 'small hills'.

In 1956, the line between Dandenong and Narre Warren was duplicated, with duplication to Berwick provided in 1962. As part of the duplication to Berwick, an island platform was provided, as well as boom barriers replacing interlocked gates at the former Webb Street level crossing which, at the time, was located at the down end of the station.

In 1970, a crossover between No. 2 and No.3 roads was abolished. In 1974, flashing light signals were provided at the former Cranbourne Road level crossing, which was located nearby in the down direction of the station. In 1978, the waiting room at the original station was demolished.

In 1986, boom barriers were provided at the Cranbourne Road level crossing. By 1988, No. 2 road was booked out of use, as well as points at each end of the road and a crossover at the up end of the station. In 1989, the signal box was abolished.

On 2 June 1995, the station was relocated to the east side of the Webb Street level crossing, and reopened to the public the following day.

In October 2003, Narre Warren was upgraded to a premium station. In 2004, the Cranbourne Road level crossing was grade separated, being replaced with a road underpass.

On 29 July 2021, the Level Crossing Removal Project announced that the Webb Street level crossing would be grade separated by 2025, with a rail over road "hybrid" design. Webb Street was to be lowered and a rail bridge built over the road, with the station to be rebuilt as part of those works. However, on 14 January 2022, the LXRP announced that the "hybrid" design would be replaced with a rail over road design, removing the need to lower Webb Street. On 23 August of that year, final designs for the level crossing removal and rebuilt station were released.

On 24 November 2023, a 'construction blitz' began, which saw the station close and demolished, while trains stopped running on sections of the Pakenham line. On 10 December of that year, the construction blitz ended, with trains on the Pakenham line resuming the following day, operating on the rail-over-road bridge without stopping at Narre Warren. Services resumed stopping at the station as it reopened on 28 March 2024.

== Platforms, facilities and services ==
Narre Warren has two side platforms. It is located on top of Webb Street, which also provided station access. The 2003 station featured a semi-large fibro building was located at the Flinders Street (Up) end of the station, which housed an enclosed waiting area, toilets and ticket facilities. There was a myki ticket vending machine inside the waiting area. There was also a small café located next to the entrance of the building, which was open during the morning peak-hour, selling coffee and newspapers. A Protective Service Officers' (PSO) pod was located next to the station building, which was used from 6:00 pm until the last service every day.

Narre Warren is served by Pakenham line trains. On average, there are three off-peak services per hour on weekdays, travelling to and from Flinders Street, with more frequent services during peak-hours, and three services an hour on weekends.

Narre Warren platform arrangement
Platform	Line	Destination	Via	Service Pattern	Source
1	Pakenham line	Sunbury, Watergardens, West Footscray	Town Hall	Limited express	
2	Pakenham line	East Pakenham		All stations	

== Transport links ==
Cranbourne Transit operates one bus route via Narre Warren station, under contract to Public Transport Victoria:

- 895 : Narre Warren South – Westfield Fountain Gate

Ventura Bus Lines operates two routes via Narre Warren station, under contract to Public Transport Victoria:

- 835 : Berwick station – Westfield Fountain Gate (via Narre Warren)
- 841 : Narre Warren North – Cranbourne

== Gallery ==
=== Before rebuild ===
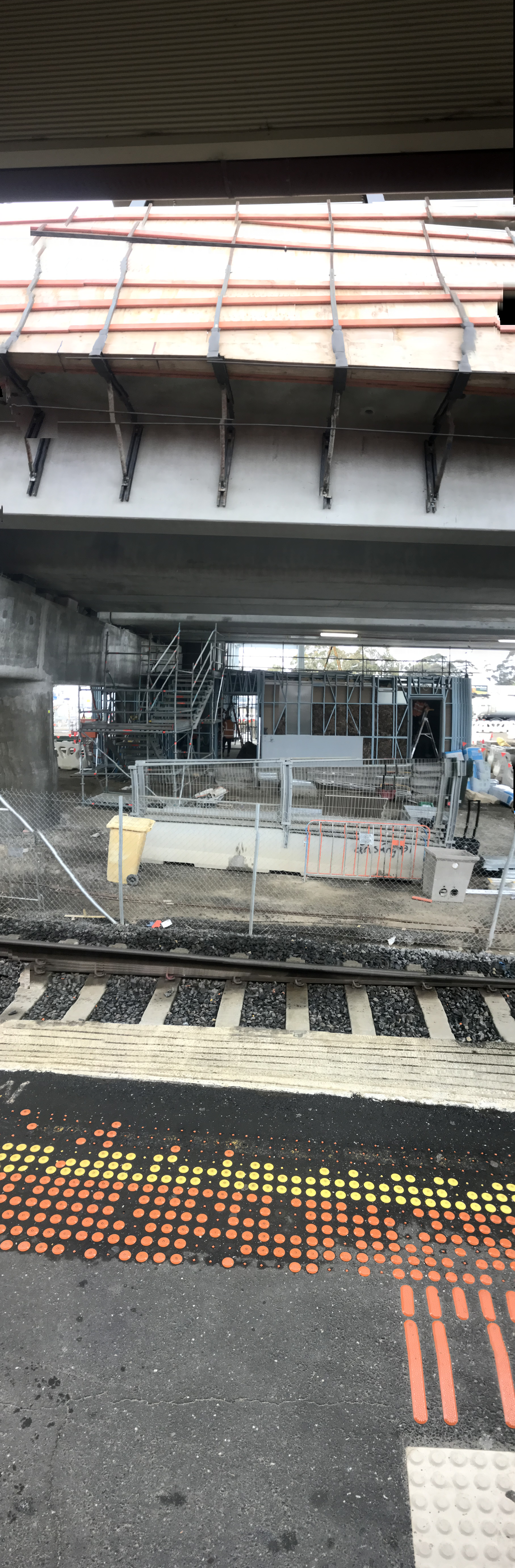
Panorama shot of northbound view from Platform 2 with rail hybrid bridge under construction, November 2023

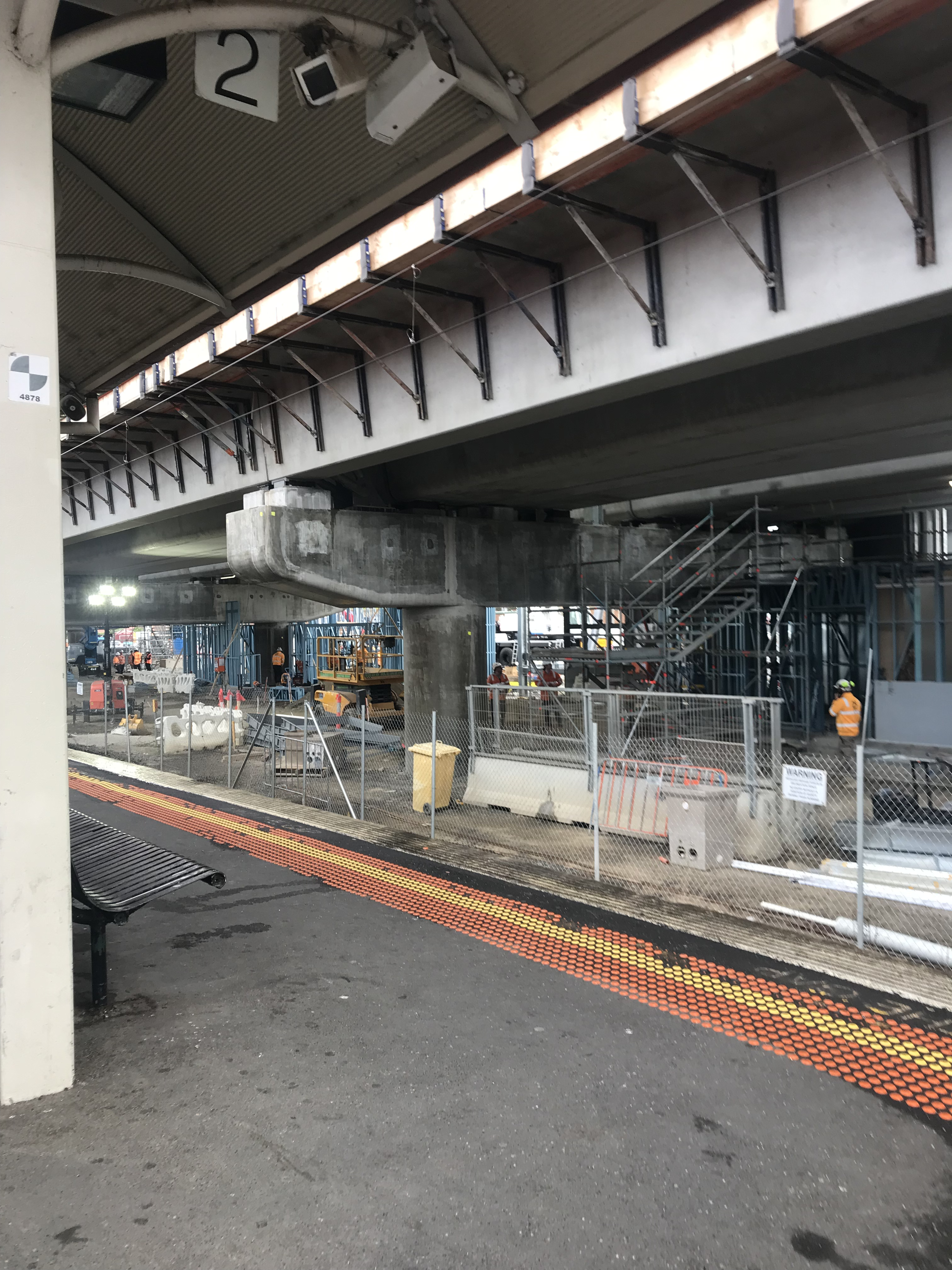
Westbound view from Platform 2 viewing rail hybrid bridge under construction, November 2023

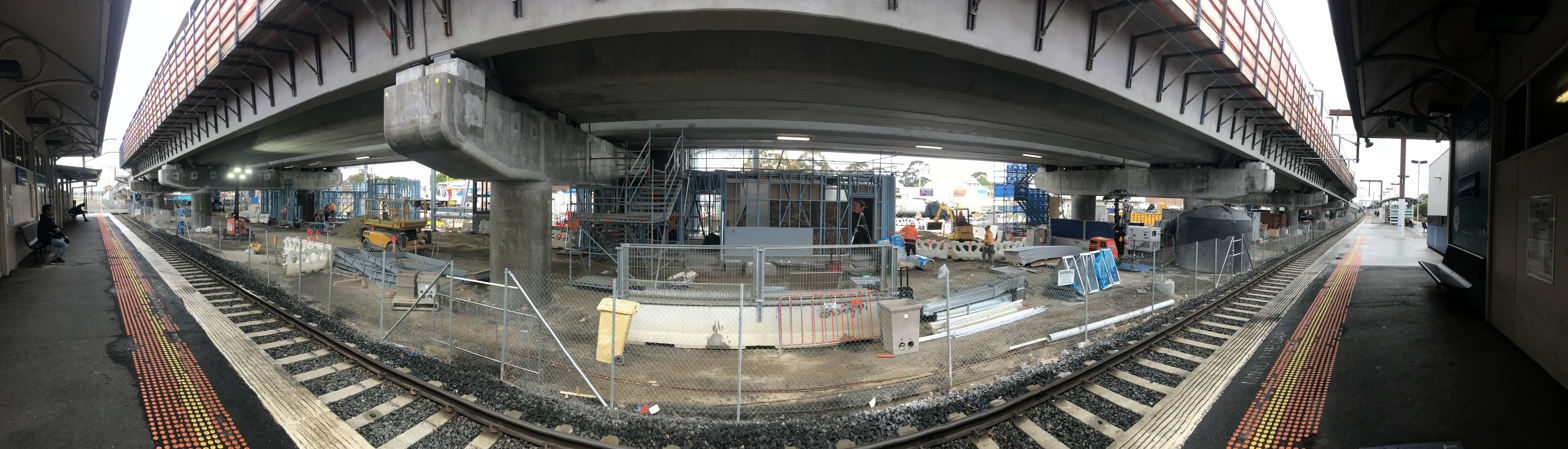
Panorama shot of northbound view from Platform 2 viewing rail hybrid bridge under construction, November 2023

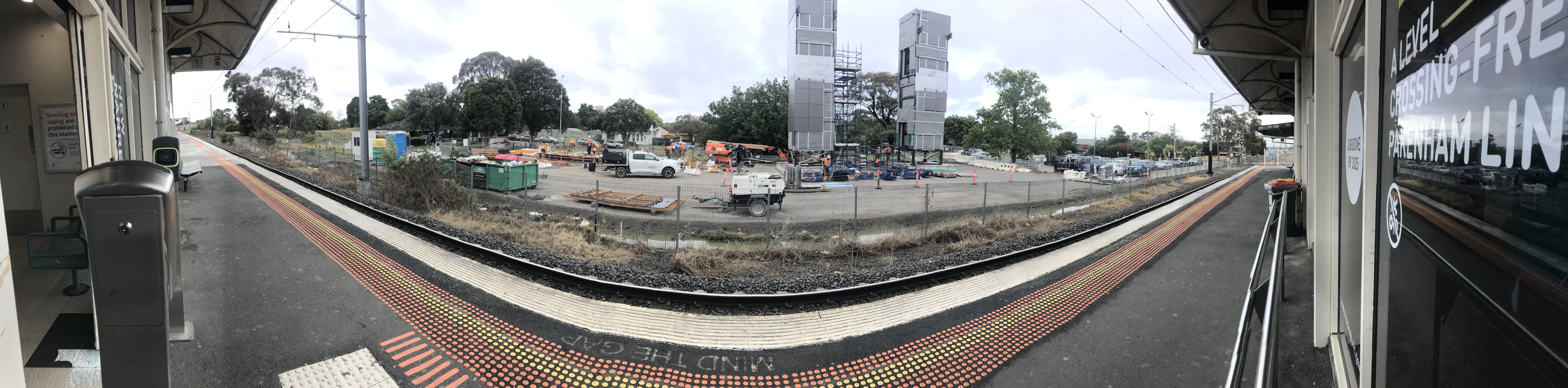
Panorama shot of southbound view from Platform 1, November 2023

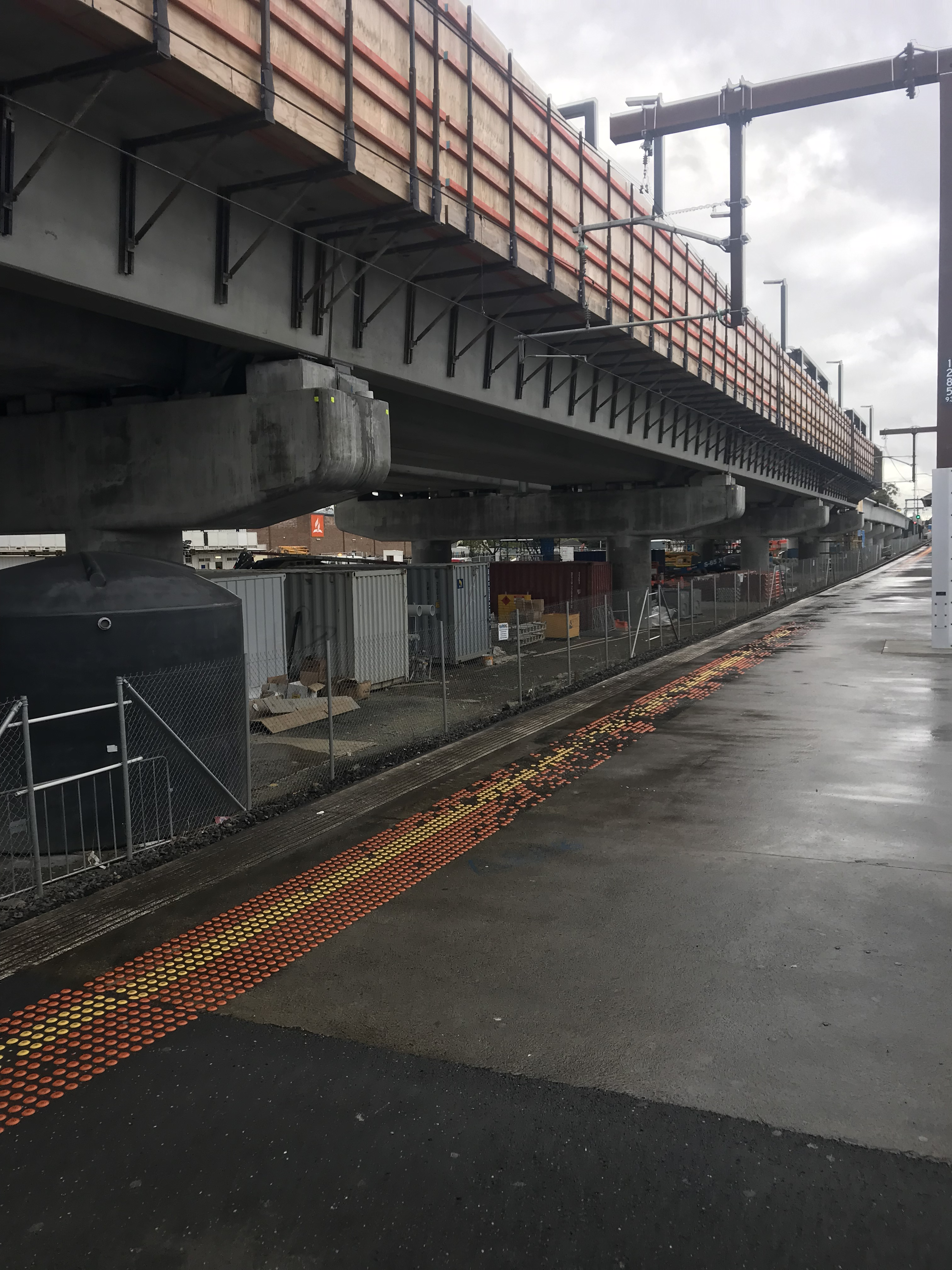
Eastbound view from Platform 2 with rail hybrid bridge under construction, November 2023

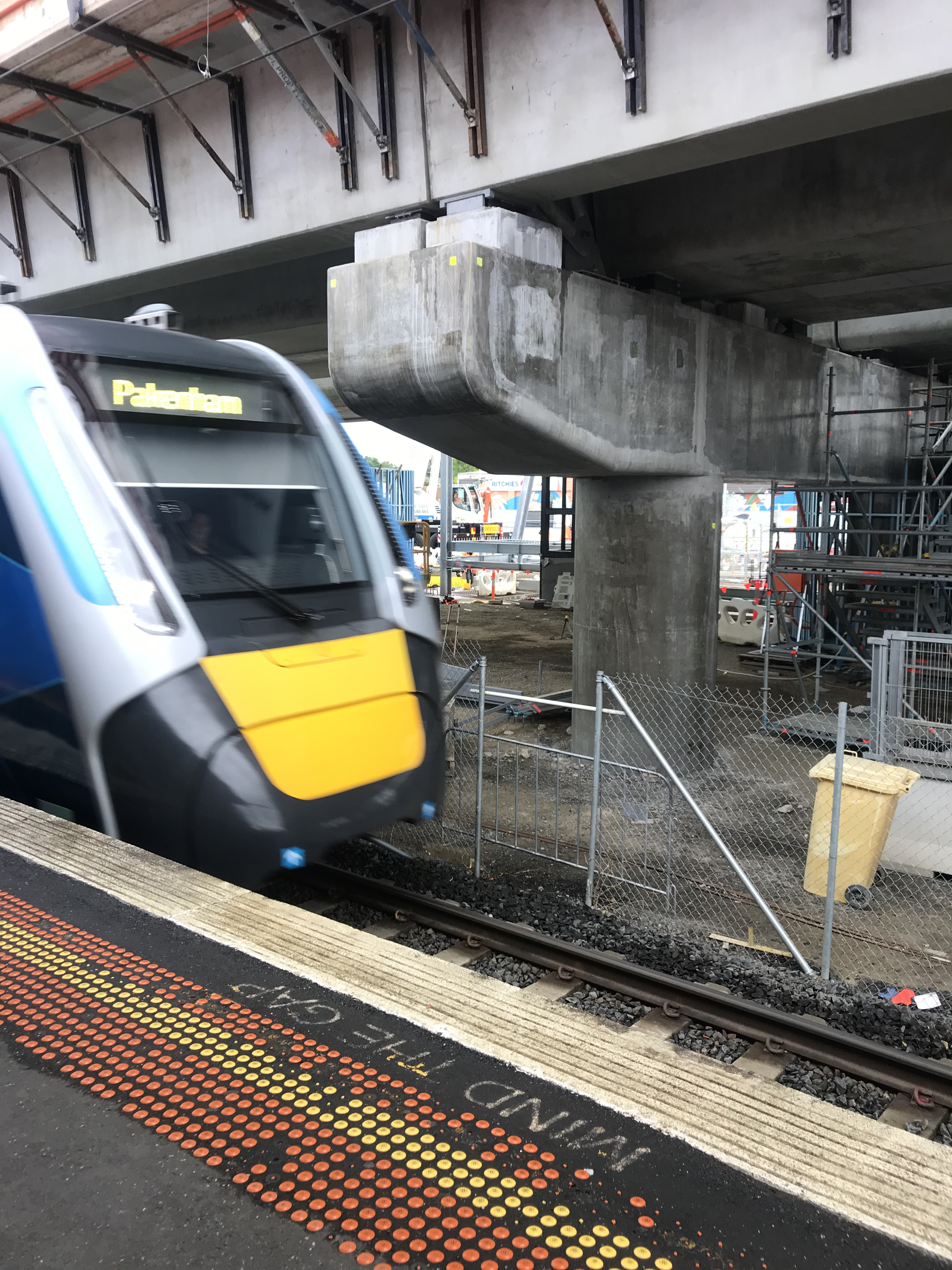
HCMT arriving into Platform 2 next to rail hybrid bridge under construction, November 2023

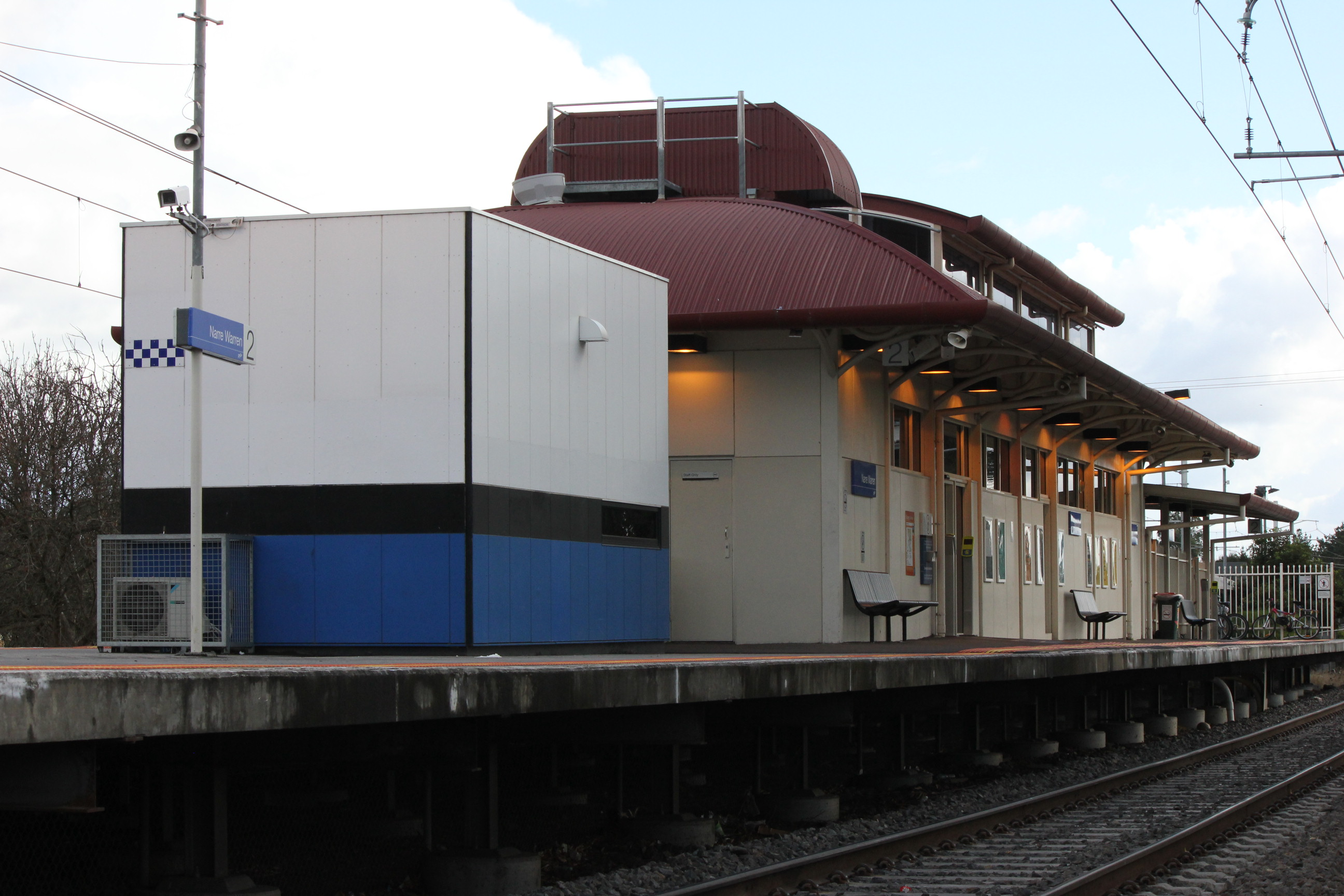
Former ground level station building and platform, May 2017

=== After rebuild ===
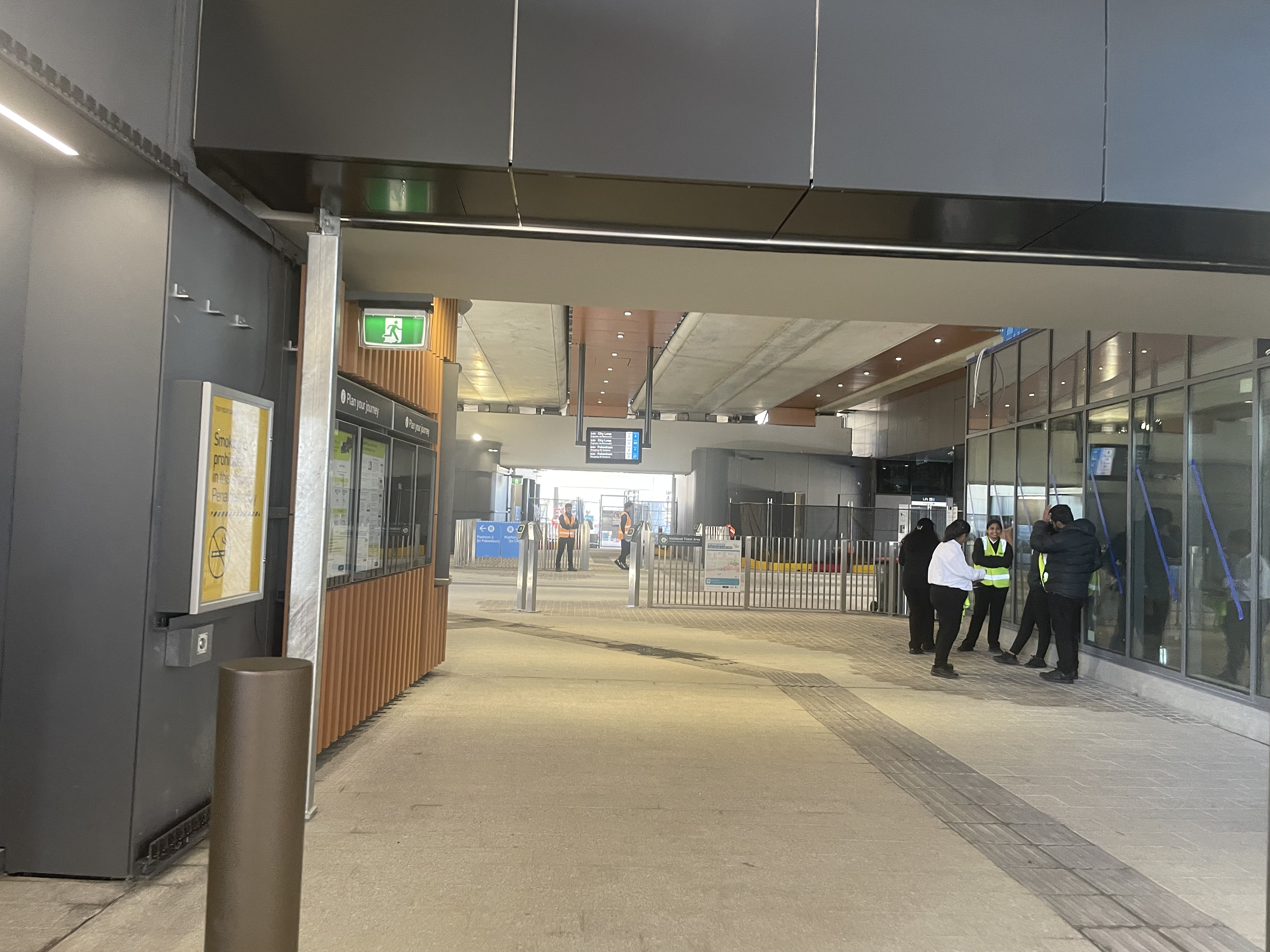
New concourse and entrance at Narre Warren, March 2024

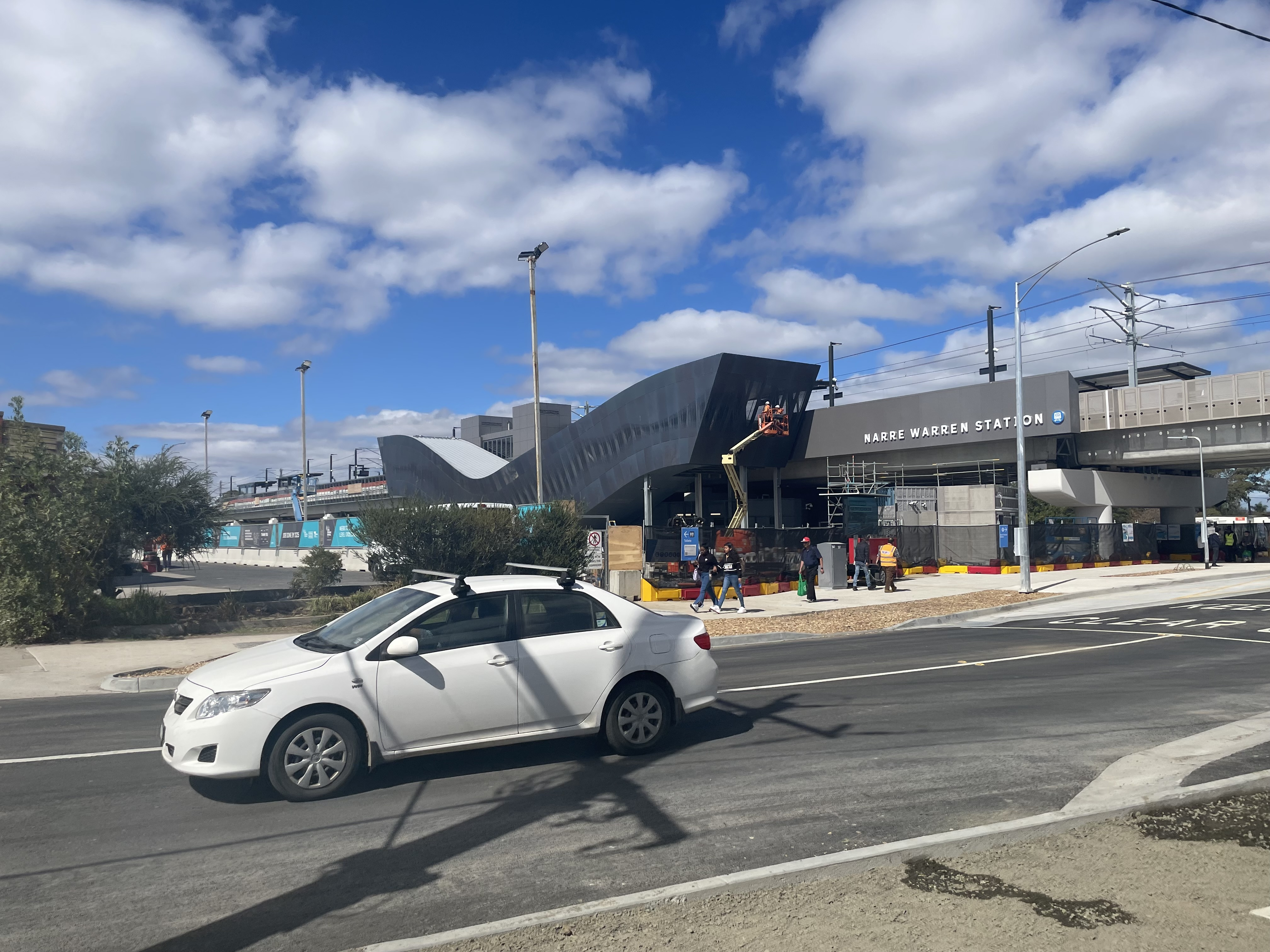
Narre Warren curved station building, March 2024, with additional works to be completed

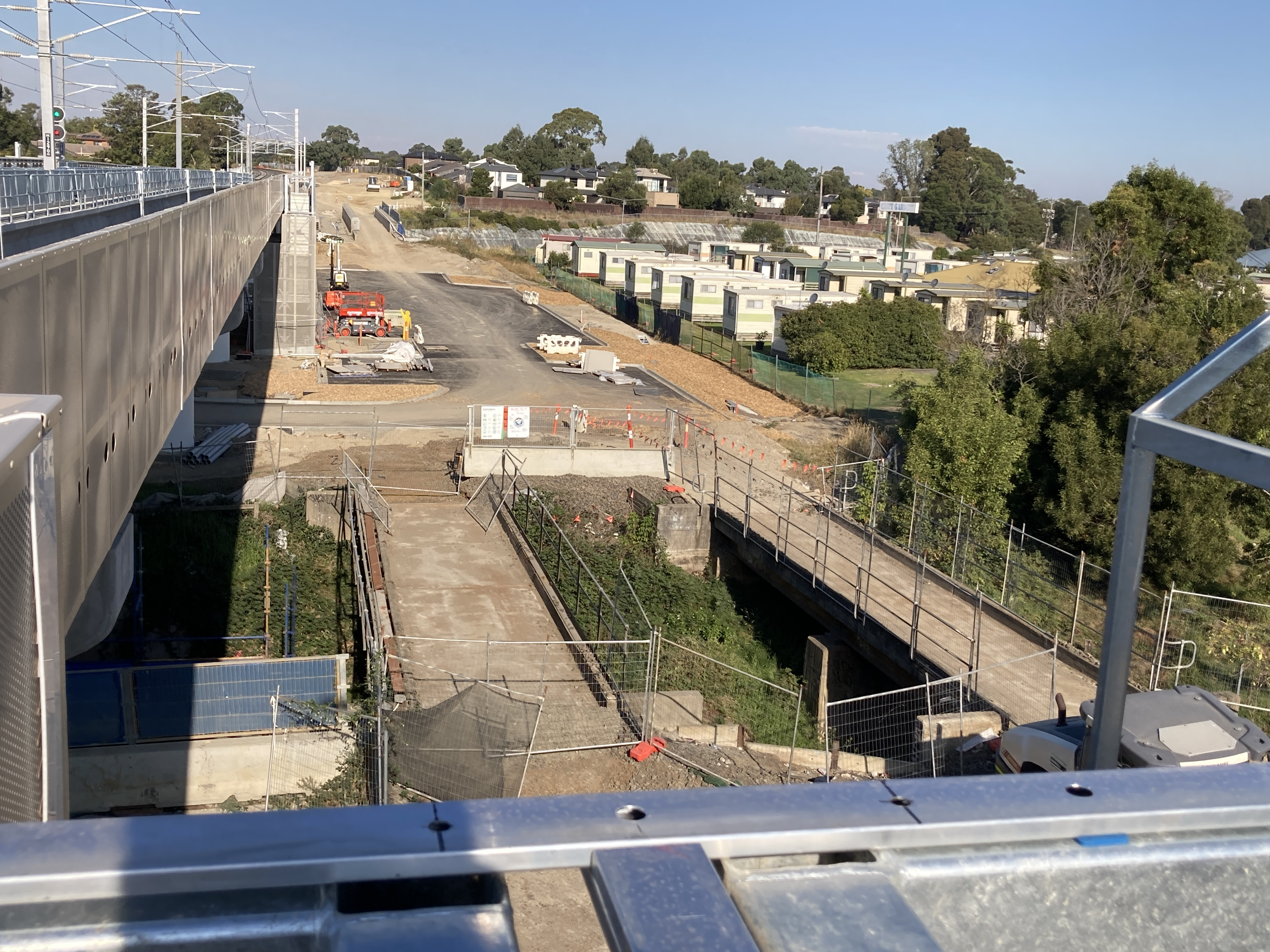
Disused railway bridges with tracks removed, March 2024
