= Officer railway station =

Railway station in Melbourne, Australia

Officer
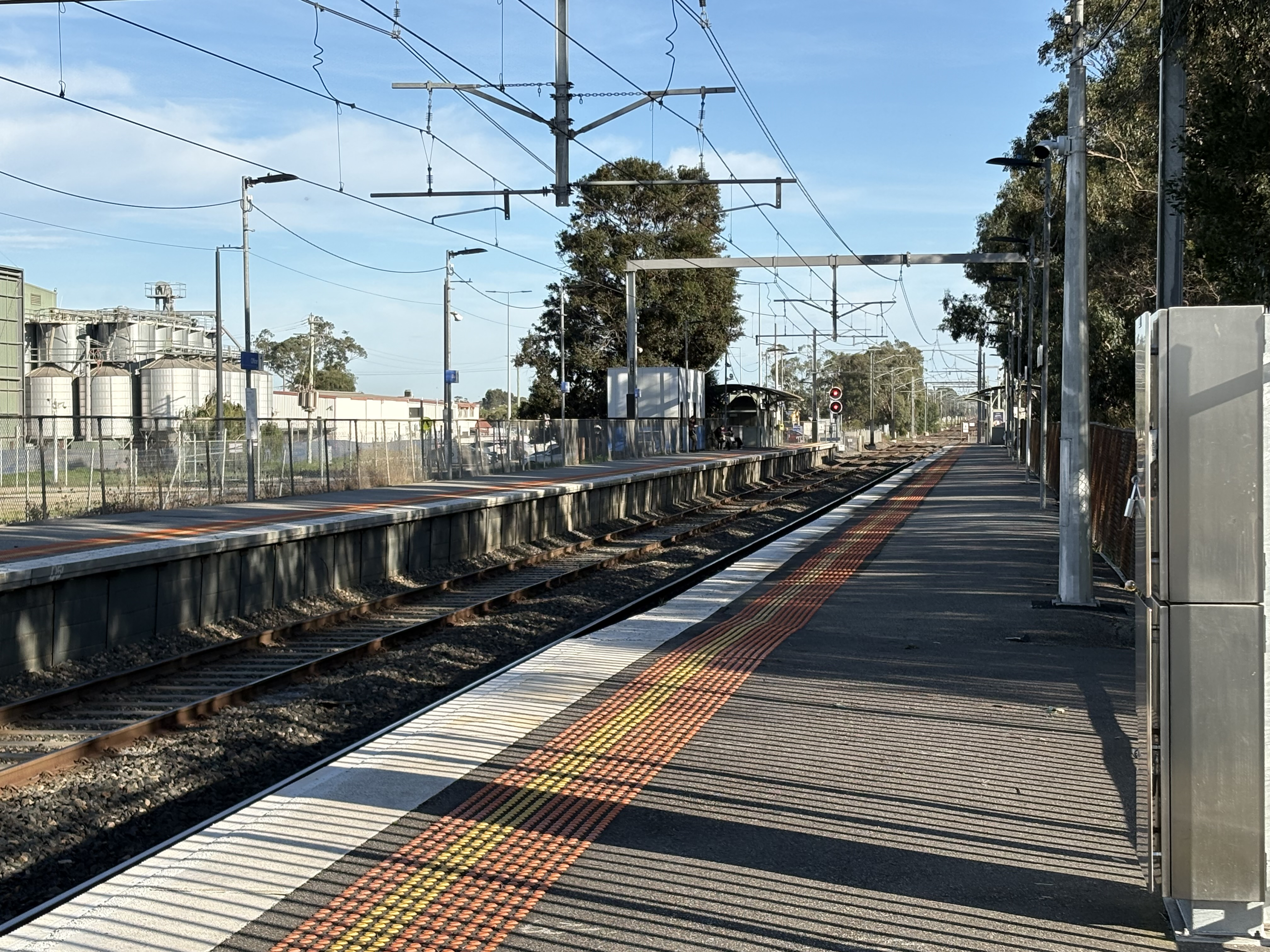
- Westbound view from Platform 2, May 2026

General information
- Location: Station Street, Officer, Victoria 3809; Shire of Cardinia; Australia
- Coordinates: 38°03′58″S 145°24′40″E
- System: PTV commuter rail station
- Owner: VicTrack
- Operator: Metro Trains
- Line: Pakenham
- Distance: 51.45 kilometres from Southern Cross
- Platforms: 2 side
- Tracks: 2

Construction
- Structure type: Ground
- Parking: 193 (including 9 accessible)
- Accessible: Yes—step free access

Other information
- Status: Operational, unstaffed
- Station code: OFC
- Fare zone: Myki zone 2
- Website: Public Transport Victoria

History
- Opened: 4 August 1881; 145 years ago
- Rebuilt: 13 May 1956; 1990s
- Electrified: July 1954 (1500 V DC overhead)
- Former names: Officer's Siding (1881-1888)

Passengers
- 2005–2006: 13,105
- 2006–2007: 18,638 ▲42.22%
- 2007–2008: 21,638 ▲16.09%
- 2008–2009: 21,479 ▼0.73%
- 2009–2010: 28,418 ▲32.3%
- 2010–2011: 42,929 ▲51.06%
- 2011–2012: 55,427 ▲29.11%
- 2012–2013: Not measured
- 2013–2014: 19,287 ▼65.2%
- 2014–2015: 27,283 ▲41.45%
- 2015–2016: 60,255 ▲120.85%
- 2016–2017: 76,085 ▲26.27%
- 2017–2018: 91,956 ▲20.86%
- 2018–2019: 122,891 ▲33.64%
- 2019–2020: 132,100 ▲7.49%
- 2020–2021: 62,250 ▼52.87%
- 2021–2022: 64,850 ▲4.17%
- 2022–2023: 127,000 ▲95.83%

Services
| Preceding station | Metro Trains | Following station |
|---|---|---|
| Beaconsfield towards Watergardens or Sunbury via Metro Tunnel | Pakenham line | Cardinia Road towards East Pakenham |
Track layout
Location

Officer station is a railway station operated by Metro Trains Melbourne on the Pakenham line, part of the Melbourne rail network. It serves the south-eastern suburb of Officer, in Melbourne, Victoria, Australia. Officer station is a ground-level unstaffed station, featuring two side platforms. It opened on 4 August 1881, with the current station provided in 1956.

Initially opened as Officer's Siding, the station was given its current name of Officer on 13 February 1888.

== History ==
Officer station opened on 4 August 1881, almost four years after the railway line was extended from Dandenong to Pakenham. Like the suburb itself, the station was named after Robert Officer, a local pastoralist. Another theory is that the station and suburb were named after the Officer family, who were originally from Deniliquin, New South Wales.

In 1955, the line between Officer and Pakenham was duplicated and, on 13 May 1956, duplication between Officer and Berwick was provided. In that year, a new station was also provided east of the original site.

In 1976, flashing light signals were provided at the former Station Street level crossing, which was located nearby in the up direction of the station. A decade later, in 1986, boom barriers were provided.

On 8 May 1987, a collision involving a Flinders Street-bound Comeng train set and V/Line locomotive N457, operating an up Traralgon service, occurred in the down direction of the station. 45 people were injured in the collision. Comeng carriage 388M was later scrapped due to the collision, however, part of the carriage was later used as a café in the pedestrian underpass at Werribee.

In 1988, the former goods siding was taken out of service. The main line points leading into the siding were spiked, and were removed at a later date.

Sometime during or after 1995, the present station shelters were provided, replacing timber station buildings.

During the 2011/2012 financial year, it was the second least used station on Melbourne's metropolitan system, with 55,000 passenger movements.

On 18 May 2024, under the Level Crossing Removal Project, the Station Street level crossing was closed to vehicle traffic and replaced with pedestrian gates located further up next to the station.

== Platforms and services ==
Officer has two side platforms. It is serviced by Metro Trains' Pakenham line services.

Officer platform arrangement
| Platform | Line | Destination | Via | Service Pattern | Source |
|---|---|---|---|---|---|
| 1 | Pakenham line | Sunbury, Watergardens, West Footscray | Town Hall | Limited express | |
| 2 | Pakenham line | East Pakenham | | All stations | |
