= Pakenham line =

Passenger rail service in metropolitan Melbourne, Victoria, Australia

Pakenham

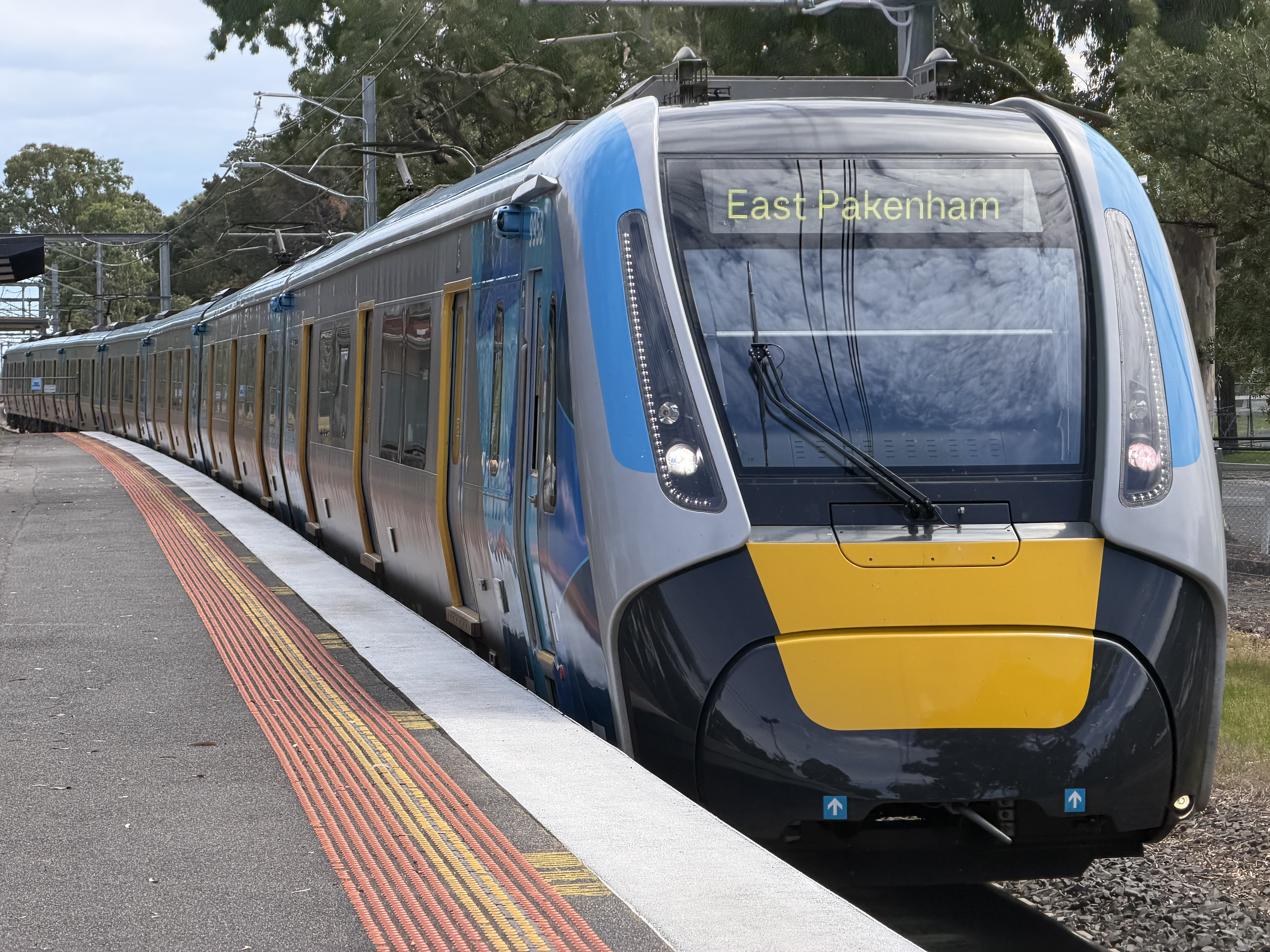
- An East Pakenham-bound service High Capacity Metro Train arriving at Sandown Park station Platform 2, February 2026

Overview
- Service type: Commuter rail
- System: Melbourne railway network
- Status: Operational
- Locale: Melbourne, Victoria, Australia
- Predecessor: Princes Bridge – Richmond (1859–1860); Princes Bridge – South Yarra (1860–1879); Oakleigh – Pakenham (1877–1879); Dandenong ^ (1922–1954)^ are electric services
- First service: 8 October 1877; 149 years ago as South Gippsland line
- Current operator: Metro Trains
- Former operators: Victorian Railways (VR) (1877–1974); VR as VicRail (1974–1983); MTA (The Met) (1983–1989); PTC (The Met) (1989–1998); Bayside Trains (1998–2000); M>Train (2000–2004); Connex Melbourne (2004–2009)

Route
- Termini: Town Hall; East Pakenham
- Stops: 24
- Distance travelled: 58.8 km (36.5 mi)
- Average journey time: 1 hour 13 minutes
- Service frequency: 3–4 minutes to and from Dandenong during weekday peak; 10 minutes to and from Dandenong off-peak; 20 minutes from East Pakenham to the city; 60 minutes early weekend mornings
- Line used: Gippsland

Technical
- Rolling stock: HCMT
- Track gauge: 1,600 mm (5 ft 3 in)
- Electrification: 1500 V DC overhead
- Track owner: VicTrack

The Pakenham line is a commuter railway line on the Melbourne metropolitan railway network serving the city of Melbourne in Victoria, Australia. Operated by Metro Trains Melbourne, the line is coloured light blue and is one of the three lines that constitute the Metro Tunnel Group. It is the city's longest metropolitan railway line at 58.8 kilometres (36.5 mi). The line runs from Town Hall station in central Melbourne to East Pakenham station in the south-east, serving 24 stations via Caulfield, Oakleigh, and Dandenong.

The line operates for approximately 20 hours a day (from approximately 4:00 am to around midnight) with 24 hour service available on Friday and Saturday nights. During peak hour, headways of up to 5 to 10 minutes are operated with services every 20 minutes during off-peak hours. Trains on the Pakenham line run with a seven-car formation operated by High Capacity Metro Trains. Since 1 February 2026, the Pakenham line is through routed with the Sunbury line, running through the Metro Tunnel via Town Hall station.

Sections of the Pakenham line opened as early as 1859, with the line fully extended to Pakenham in October 1877. A limited number of stations were first opened, with infill stations progressively opened between 1879 and 2012. The line was built to connect Melbourne with the rural towns of Caulfield, Oakleigh, and Dandenong, amongst others. Significant growth has occurred since opening, with an extension to open on the Pakenham line one stop east to a new station in Pakenham East as part of the Level Crossing Removal Project. This extension opened on 3 June 2024.

Since the 2010s, due to the heavily utilised infrastructure of the Pakenham line, significant improvements and upgrades have been made. A$15 billion upgrade of the corridor included the replacement of sleepers, the introduction of new signalling technology, the introduction of new rolling stock, the removal of all level crossings, and works associated with the Metro Tunnel project. These projects have improved the quality and safety of the line and were completed by the opening of the Metro Tunnel in November 2025.

== History ==
=== 19th century ===
In 1877, the Pakenham line began operations from Oakleigh to Bunyip, as part of the main line to Gippsland. The section from Oakleigh to Flinders Street station was connected at South Yarra in April 1879. In 1877, the Pakenham line began operations from Oakleigh to Bunyip, as part of the single-tracked main line to Gippsland, with an extension of the duplicated section of the line opening in 1881 to Caulfield, Oakleigh in 1883, and Dandenong in 1891. In 1883 the line between Richmond station and South Yarra was quadrupled to accommodate an increase in train services due to the opening of Frankston and Sandringham lines.

In 1885, a number of level crossing removal works occurred between Flinders Street station and South Yarra due to an increase in freight and passenger operations. These crossings were removed through a combination of lowering and raising the corridor.

=== 20th century ===
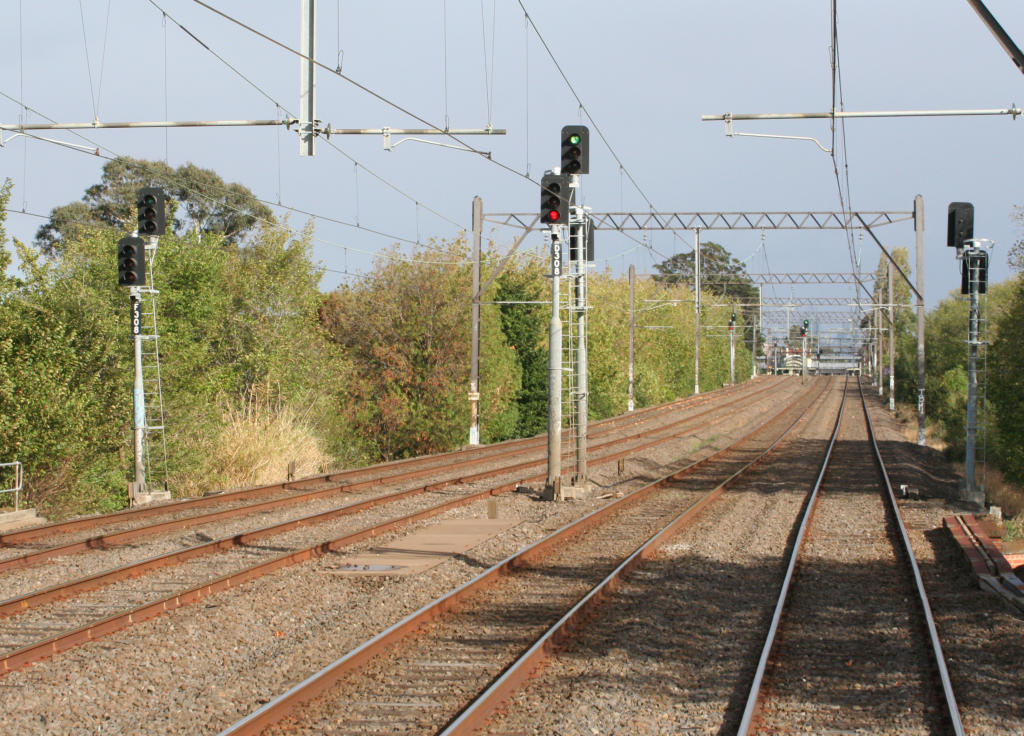
A section of the quad-tracked corridor built in 1915 between Richmond and Caulfield stations.

In 1915, the line between South Yarra and Caulfield was quadrupled, as part of level crossing removal works. This section of the line was lowered into a cutting to eliminate numerous level crossings. Power signalling was provided between Richmond and Hawksburn at the same time, then on to Caulfield in 1921.

Electrification of the line to Dandenong occurred in two stages during 1922. In May 1922, the section from South Yarra to Oakleigh station was electrified, with the section to Dandenong being electrified later in December 1922. The electrification of the line allowed for the introduction of Swing Door electric multiple unit trains for the first time.

Power signalling was extended to Carnegie in 1933, Oakleigh in 1940, and to Dandenong in stages between 1970 and 1972.

The line between Dandenong, Pakenham and Traralgon was electrified in 1954. Initially single track, duplication of the line between Dandenong, Pakenham and Nar Nar Goon was completed in 1955 and 1956. Suburban services were extended beyond Dandenong to Pakenham in January 1975. Previously, the stations between Dandenong and Pakenham were only served by regional passenger trains connecting Gippsland to Melbourne.

In 1981, Pakenham line services commenced operations through the City Loop, after previously terminating at Flinders or Spencer Street stations. The commencement of operations involved the service stopping at three new stations—Parliament, Melbourne Central (formally Museum), and Flagstaff. The Loop follows La Trobe and Spring Streets along the northern and eastern edges of the Hoddle Grid. The Loop connects with Melbourne's two busiest stations, Flinders Street and Southern Cross, via the elevated Flinders Street Viaduct. As of February 2026, the Pakenham line no longer operates through the City Loop, instead operating via the north–south Metro Tunnel corridor.

=== 21st century ===
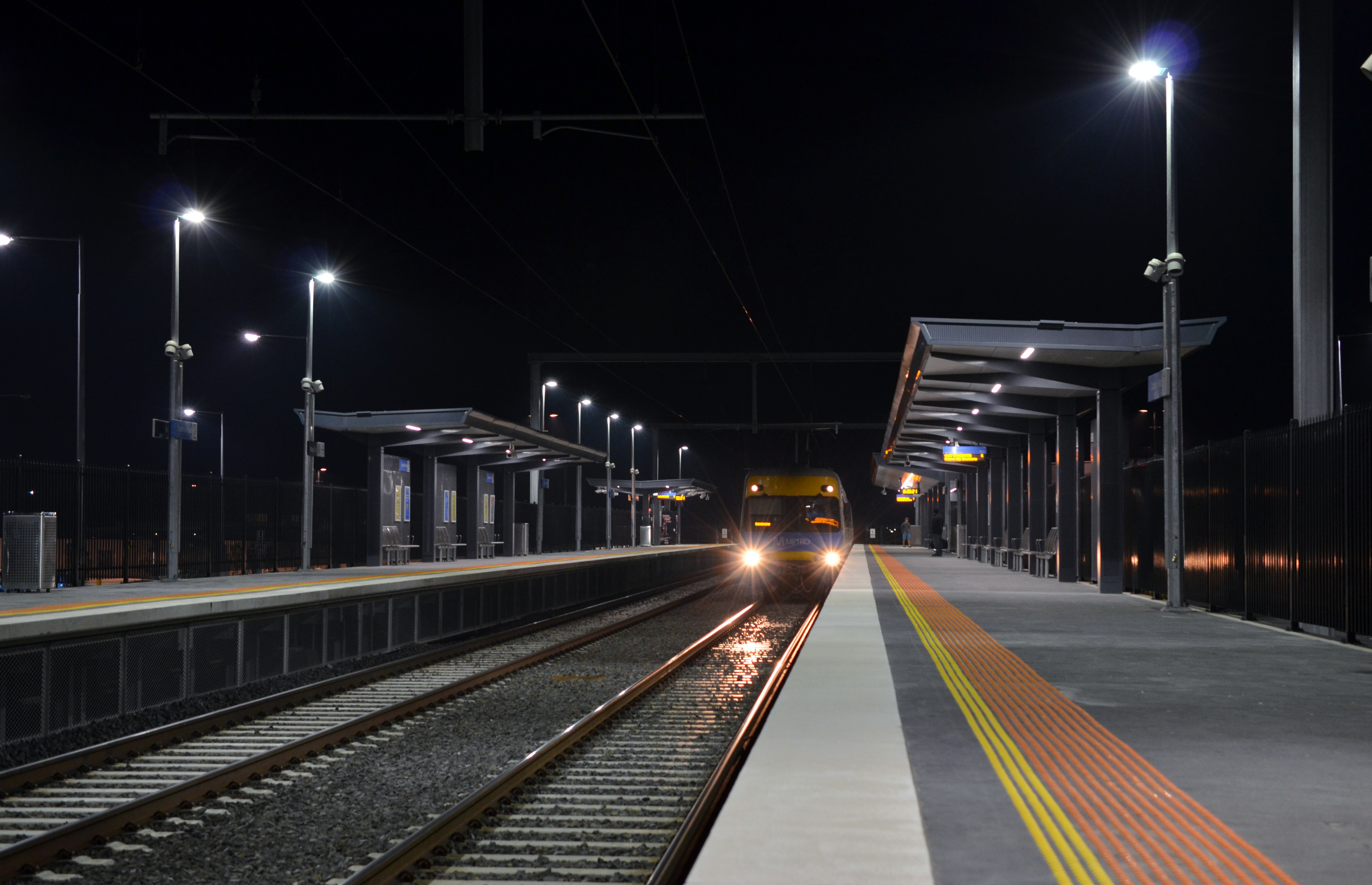
A Comeng train arriving at Cardinia Road station, July 2012

In 2002, after the closure of the nearby General Motors factory in 1991, General Motors station closed permanently after 46 years of operation. A 2007 restructure of train ticketing in Melbourne involved the removal of Zone 3, with Zone 3 stations being re-classified to Zone 2.

The Pakenham line received heavy investment during the 2010s to align with the 2013 PTV Development Plan. A new station at Cardinia Road opened in 2012 situated between Officer and Pakenham stations. This is the first infill station to open on the line since 1927, with an additional station at Pakenham East expected to open in 2024 in conjunction with level crossing removal works. In 2018, the Pakenham East Depot opened for the newly acquired High Capacity Metro Trains. This depot has stabling capacity for 30 seven-car trains with train maintenance, driver training, and washing facilities present onsite.

Announced in 2021, the Pakenham line was extended one stop east to East Pakenham. The extension involved the removal of the Main Street and Racecourse Road level crossings, the elevation of Pakenham station, the construction of a new station at East Pakenham and other associated safety and landscape works. These works were undertaken as part of the Level Crossing Removal Project. The rebuilt Pakenham and East Pakenham opened on 3 June 2024.

== Route ==
Interactive map of the Pakenham line in south-eastern Melbourne.

The Pakenham line forms a relatively linear route from the Melbourne central business district to its terminus in Pakenham. The route is 57 kilometres (35 mi) long and is predominantly doubled tracked, however between Flinders Street and Richmond, the corridor is widened to 12 tracks, narrowing to six tracks between Richmond and South Yarra before again narrowing to four tracks between South Yarra and Caulfield. After Caulfield station, the corridor again narrows to two tracks for the rest of the route. The only underground section of the Pakenham line is in the Metro Tunnel, where the service stops at 2 underground stations. Exiting the city, the Pakenham line traverses mainly flat country with few curves and fairly minimal earthworks for most of the line. However, between South Yarra and Malvern, the rail corridor has been lowered into a cutting to eliminate level crossings, and between Malvern and Caulfield, the corridor has been raised on an embankment for the same reason. After Caulfield, the line formerly had numerous level crossings, however, all have now been removed between Caulfield and Dandenong as part of an elevated rail project, as well as some older bridges over and under roads. The Victorian government aimed to remove all level crossings from the line by 2025, to improve travel times and make local roads safer. In 2024, Star News reported that the last level crossing on the line, at Webster Street in Dandenong, was planned to be removed in late 2025. As of January 2026, the Level Crossing Removal Project website listed the project as still under construction, without an update since the previous year.

The line follows the same alignment as the Cranbourne line with the two services splitting onto different routes at Dandenong. The Pakenham line continues on its eastern alignment, whereas the Cranbourne line takes a southerly alignment towards its final destination of Cranbourne station. Most of the rail line goes through built-up suburbs and some industrial areas, but after Dandenong, the line passes through more open countryside, including open fields and farms, particularly after Beaconsfield. This outer portion of the line is one of Melbourne's main growth corridors, where farmland is being replaced with housing and commercial developments, leading to a rise in patronage.

=== Stations ===
The line serves 24 stations across 57 kilometres (35 mi) of track. The stations are a mix of elevated, lowered, underground, and ground level designs. Underground stations are present only in the City Loop, with the majority of elevated and lowered stations being constructed as part of the Level Crossing Removal Project. On 1 February 2026, services ceased stopping at Flinders Street, Southern Cross, Flagstaff, Melbourne Central, Parliament, Richmond and South Yarra stations due to the opening of the Metro Tunnel, and instead began stopping at Anzac and Town Hall. From March–June 2024, Narre Warren and Pakenham stations were elevated as part of Level Crossing Removal Project. On 1 February 2026, the Metro Tunnel began full operation, and the Pakenham and Cranbourne lines were through-routed through to Sunbury.

Station	Image	Accessibility	Opened	Terrain	Train connections	Other connections
Town Hall		Yes - step free access	2025	Underground	16 connections: * Alamein line; Belgrave line; Craigieburn line; Cranbourne line; Flemington Racecourse line; Frankston line; Gippsland line; Glen Waverley line; Hurstbridge line; Lilydale line; Mernda line; Sandringham line; Sunbury line; Upfield line; Werribee line; Williamstown line	Trains Trams
Anzac		Yes - step free access	2025	Underground	2 connection: Cranbourne line; Sunbury line	Trams Buses
Malvern		No—steep ramp	1879	Lowered	2 connections: Cranbourne line; Frankston line	Trams
Caulfield		No—steep ramp		Ground level	3 connections: Cranbourne line; Frankston line; Gippsland line	Trams Buses
Carnegie		Yes—step free access		Elevated	1 connection: Cranbourne line	Buses
Murrumbeena		Yes—step free access		Elevated	1 connection: Cranbourne line	Buses
Hughesdale		Yes—step free access	1925	Elevated	1 connection: Cranbourne line	Buses
Oakleigh		Yes—step free access	1877	Ground level	1 connection: Cranbourne line	Buses
Huntingdale		No—steep ramp	1927	Ground level	1 connection: Cranbourne line	Buses
Clayton		Yes—step free access	1880	Elevated	2 connections: Cranbourne line; Gippsland line	Buses
Westall		Yes—step free access	1951	Ground level	1 connection: Cranbourne line	Buses
Springvale		Yes—step free access	1880	Lowered	1 connection: Cranbourne line	Buses
Sandown Park		No—steep ramp	1888	Ground level	1 connection: Cranbourne line	Buses
Noble Park		Yes—step free access	1913	Elevated	1 connection: Cranbourne line	Buses
Yarraman		No—steep ramp	1976	Ground level	1 connection: Cranbourne line	Buses
Dandenong		No—steep ramp	1877	Ground level	2 connections: Cranbourne line; Gippsland line	Buses Coaches
Hallam		Yes—step free access	1880	Elevated		Buses
Narre Warren		Yes—step free access	1882	Elevated		Buses
Berwick		Yes—step free access	1877	Ground level	1 connection: Gippsland line	Buses
Beaconsfield		No—steep ramp	1879	Ground level		Buses
Officer		Yes—step free access	1881	Ground level		
Cardinia Road		Yes—step free access	2012	Ground level		Buses
Pakenham		Yes—step free access	1877	Elevated	1 connection: Gippsland line	Buses Coaches
East Pakenham		Yes—step free access	2024	Ground level		Buses

Station histories
Station	Opened	Closed	Age	Notes
Arden	30 November 2025		Underground	
Parkville	30 November 2025		Underground	
State Library	30 November 2025		Underground	
Town Hall	30 November 2025		Underground	
Anzac	30 November 2025		Underground	
Hawksburn	7 May 1889		137 years	Not a stop since 31 January 2021 due to a timetable reshuffle
Toorak	7 May 1879		147 years	Not a stop since 31 January 2021 due to a timetable reshuffle
Armadale	7 May 1879		147 years	Not a stop since 31 January 2021 due to a timetable reshuffle
Malvern	7 May 1879		147 years	
Caulfield	7 May 1879		147 years	
Carnegie	14 May 1879		147 years	Formerly Rosstown
Murrumbeena	14 May 1879		147 years	
Hughesdale	28 February 1925		101 years	
Oakleigh	8 October 1877		149 years	
Huntingdale	25 June 1927		99 years	Formerly Eastoakleigh
Clayton	6 January 1880		146 years	Formerly Clayton's Road
Westall	6 February 1951		75 years	
Springvale	1 September 1880		146 years	Formerly Spring Vale
Sandown Park	c. December 1888	15 May 1955	Approx. 66 years	Formerly Oakleigh Park Racecourse
Sandown Park	19 June 1965		61 years	Formerly Oakleigh Park Racecourse
Noble Park	3 February 1913		113 years	
Yarraman	21 December 1976		49 years	
Dandenong	8 October 1877		149 years	
General Motors	1 October 1956	28 July 2002	45 years	
Hallam	1 December 1880		145 years	Formerly Hallam's Road
Narre Warren	10 March 1882		144 years	
Berwick	8 October 1877		149 years	
Beaconsfield	1 December 1879		146 years	
Officer	4 August 1881		145 years	Formerly Officer's Siding
Cardinia Road	22 April 2012		14 years	
Pakenham	8 October 1877		149 years	
East Pakenham	3 June 2024		29 months	

==== Pre Metro Tunnel stations ====
Station	Accessibility	Opened	Terrain	Train connections	Other connections	Notes
Flinders Street	Yes—step free access	1854	Lowered	16 connections: * Alamein line; Belgrave line; Craigieburn line; Flemington Racecourse line; Frankston line; Gippsland line; Glen Waverley line; Hurstbridge line; Lilydale line; Mernda line; Pakenham line; Sandringham line; Sunbury line; Upfield line; Werribee line; Williamstown line	Trams Buses	Not a stop since 31 December 2025 for unspecified reasons
Southern Cross	Yes—step free access	1859	Ground level	27 connections: * Alamein line; Albury line; Ararat line; Ballarat line; Belgrave line; Bendigo line; Craigieburn line; Echuca line; Flemington Racecourse line; Geelong line; Gippsland line; Glen Waverley line; Hurstbridge line; Lilydale line; Maryborough line; Mernda line; NSW TrainLink Southern; Pakenham line; Seymour line; Shepparton line; Sunbury line; Swan Hill line; The Overland; Upfield line; Warrnambool line; Werribee line; Williamstown line	Trams Buses Trains Coaches SkyBus	Not a stop since 31 January 2026 due to the opening of The Metro Tunnel
Flagstaff	Yes—step free access	1985	Underground	10 connections: * Alamein line; Belgrave line; Craigieburn line; Glen Waverley line; Hurstbridge line; Lilydale line; Mernda line; Pakenham line; Sunbury line; Upfield line	Trams	Not a stop since 31 January 2026 due to the opening of the Metro Tunnel
Melbourne Central	Yes—step free access	1981	Underground	10 connections: * Alamein line; Belgrave line; Craigieburn line; Glen Waverley line; Hurstbridge line; Lilydale line; Mernda line; Pakenham line; Sunbury line; Upfield line	Trams Buses	Not a stop since 31 January 2026 due to the opening of The Metro Tunnel
Parliament	Yes—step free access	1983	Underground	10 connections: * Alamein line; Belgrave line; Craigieburn line; Glen Waverley line; Hurstbridge line; Lilydale line; Mernda line; Pakenham line; Sunbury line; Upfield line	Trams	Not a stop since 31 January 2026 due to the opening of The Metro Tunnel
Richmond	No—steep ramp	1859	Elevated	8 connections: Alamein line; Belgrave line; Frankston line; Gippsland line; Glen Waverley line; Lilydale line; Pakenham line; Sandringham line	Trams Buses	Not a stop since 31 January 2026 due to the opening of The Metro Tunnel
South Yarra	No—steep ramp	1860	Lowered	3 connections: Frankston line; Pakenham line; Sandringham line	Trams	Not a stop since 31 January 2026 due to the opening of the Metro Tunnel

== Services ==
Services on the Pakenham line operates from approximately 4:00am to around 11:30pm daily. In general, during peak hours, train frequency is 5 minutes on the Dandenong corridor (combined with the Cranbourne line) and 10 minutes in the AM peak on the Pakenham Line while during non-peak hours the frequency is reduced to 20–30 minutes throughout the entire route. Services run anticlockwise through the City Loop, and from 2025, Pakenham line services will cease to stop at South Yarra, Richmond, and all City Loop stations when trains are rerouted through the Metro Tunnel upon opening. On Friday nights and weekends, services run 24 hours a day, with 60 minute frequencies available outside of normal operating hours. Since 13 February 2022, some off-peak daytime Pakenham and Cranbourne line services stop at Malvern station, running express between South Yarra and Malvern stations.

Train services on the Pakenham line are also subjected to maintenance and renewal works, usually on selected Fridays and Saturdays. Shuttle bus services are provided throughout the duration of works for affected commuters.

=== Stopping patterns ===
Legend – Station status

- ◼ Premium station – Station staffed from first to last train
- ◻ Host station – Usually staffed during morning peak, however this can vary for different stations on the network.

Legend – Stopping patterns

- ◼ Premium station – Station staffed from first to last train
- ◻ Host station – Usually staffed during morning peak, however this can vary for different stations on the network.

Legend – Stopping patterns
All operate via the Metro Tunnel

- ● – All trains stop
- ◐ – Some services do not stop
- ▲ – Only inbound trains stop
- ▼ – Only outbound trains stop
- | – Trains pass and do not stop

Services continue beyond Town Hall towards West Footscray, Watergardens or Sunbury stations.

Pakenham Services
Station	Zone	Local	Ltd Express	Westall	Dandenong	AM Shuttle	PM Shuttle
◼ Town Hall	1	●	●	●	●		
◼ Anzac	1	●	●	●	●		
◻ Malvern	1	●	●	●	●		
◼ Caulfield	1	●	●	●	●		
◼ Carnegie	1	●	●	●	●		
◼ Murrumbeena	1	●	●	●	●		
◻ Hughesdale	1/2	●	●	●	●		
◼ Oakleigh	1/2	●	●	●	●		
◻ Huntingdale	1/2	●	●	●	●		
◼ Clayton	2	●	●	●	●		
◼ Westall	2	●	●	●	●		
◼ Springvale	2	●	●		●	●	
Sandown Park	2	●	●		●	●	
◼ Noble Park	2	●	●		●	●	
Yarraman	2	●	|		●	●	
◼ Dandenong	2	●	●		●	●	●
Hallam	2	●	●			●	●
◼ Narre Warren	2	●	●			●	●
◼ Berwick	2	●	●			●	●
Beaconsfield	2	●	●			●	●
Officer	2	●	●			●	●
Cardinia Road	2	●	●			●	●
◼ Pakenham	2	●	●			●	●
◼ East Pakenham	2	●	●			●	●

=== Operators ===
The Pakenham line has had a total of 7 operators since its opening in 1877. The majority of operations throughout its history have been government run: from its first service in 1877 until the 1999 privatisation of Melbourne's rail network, four different government operators have run the line. These operators, Victorian Railways, the Metropolitan Transit Authority, the Public Transport Corporation and Bayside Trains have a combined operational length of 122 years.

Bayside Trains was privatised in August 1999 and later rebranded M>Train. In 2002, M>Train was placed into receivership and the state government regained ownership of the line, with KPMG appointed as receivers to operate M>Train on behalf of the state government. Two years later, rival train operator Connex Melbourne took over the M>Train operations including the Pakenham line. Metro Trains Melbourne, the current private operator, then took over the operations in 2009. The private operators have had a combined operational period of 27 years.

Past and present operators of the Pakenham line:
Operator	Assumed operations	Ceased operations	Length of operations
Victorian Railways	1877	1983	106 years
Metropolitan Transit Authority	1983	1989	6 years
Public Transport Corporation	1989	1998	9 years
Bayside Trains (government operator)	1998	1999	1 years
M>Train	1999	2004	5 years
Connex Melbourne	2004	2009	5 years
Metro Trains Melbourne	2009	incumbent	16 years (ongoing)

== Infrastructure ==
=== Rolling stock ===
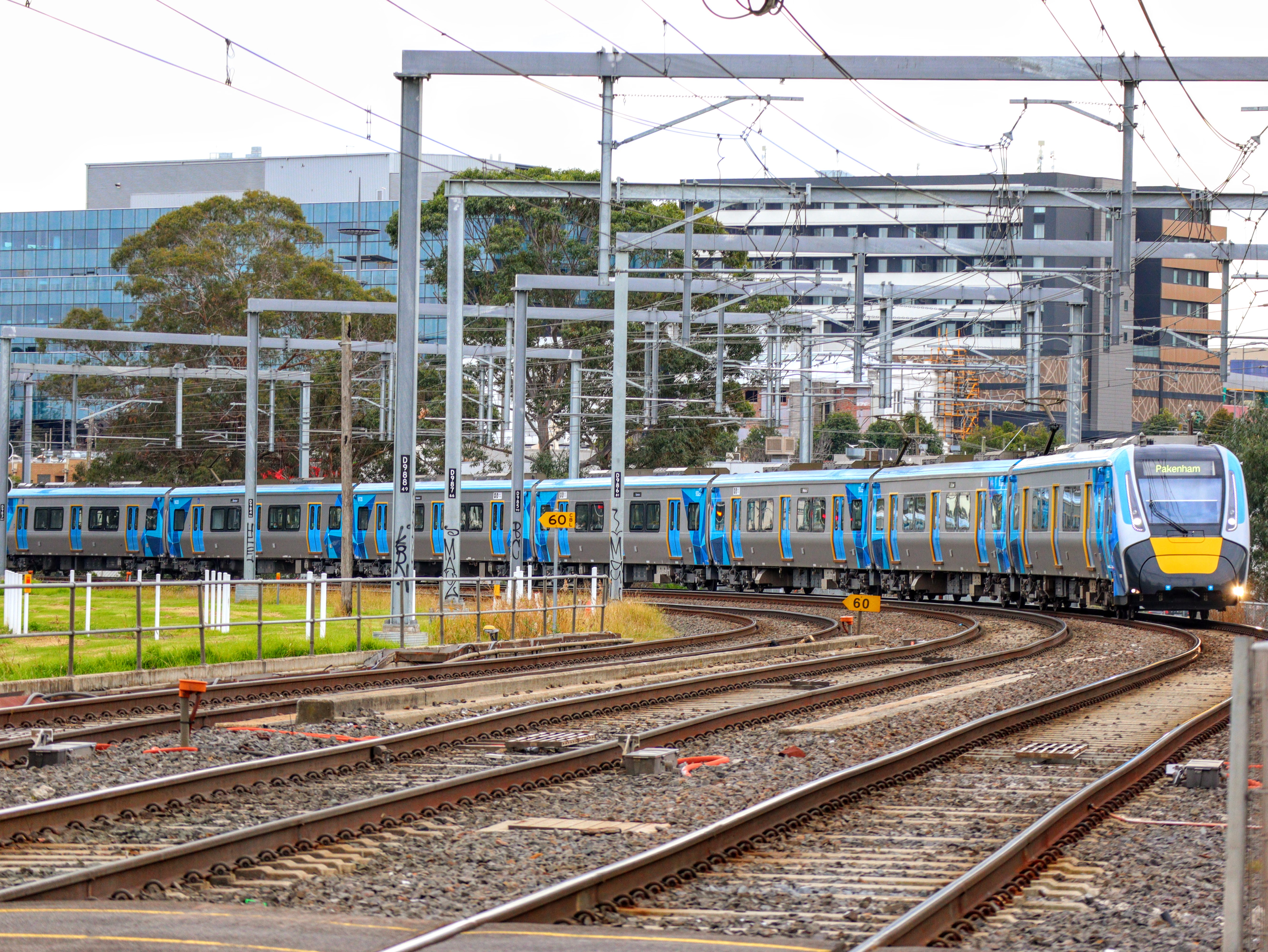
A HCMT operating a Pakenham-bound service.

The Pakenham line uses a fleet of electric multiple unit (EMU) High Capacity Metro Trains operating in a seven-car configuration, with three doors per side on each carriage and can accommodate of up to 1,380 passengers in each train-set. Shared with the Cranbourne, Sunbury, and Airport lines, the rolling stock will consist of 70 High Capacity Metro Trains (HCMT), once fully delivered. They are built in Changchun, China, with final assembly occurring in Newport, Melbourne, by Evolution Rail, a consortium composed of CRRC Changchun Railway Vehicles, Downer Rail and Plenary Group.

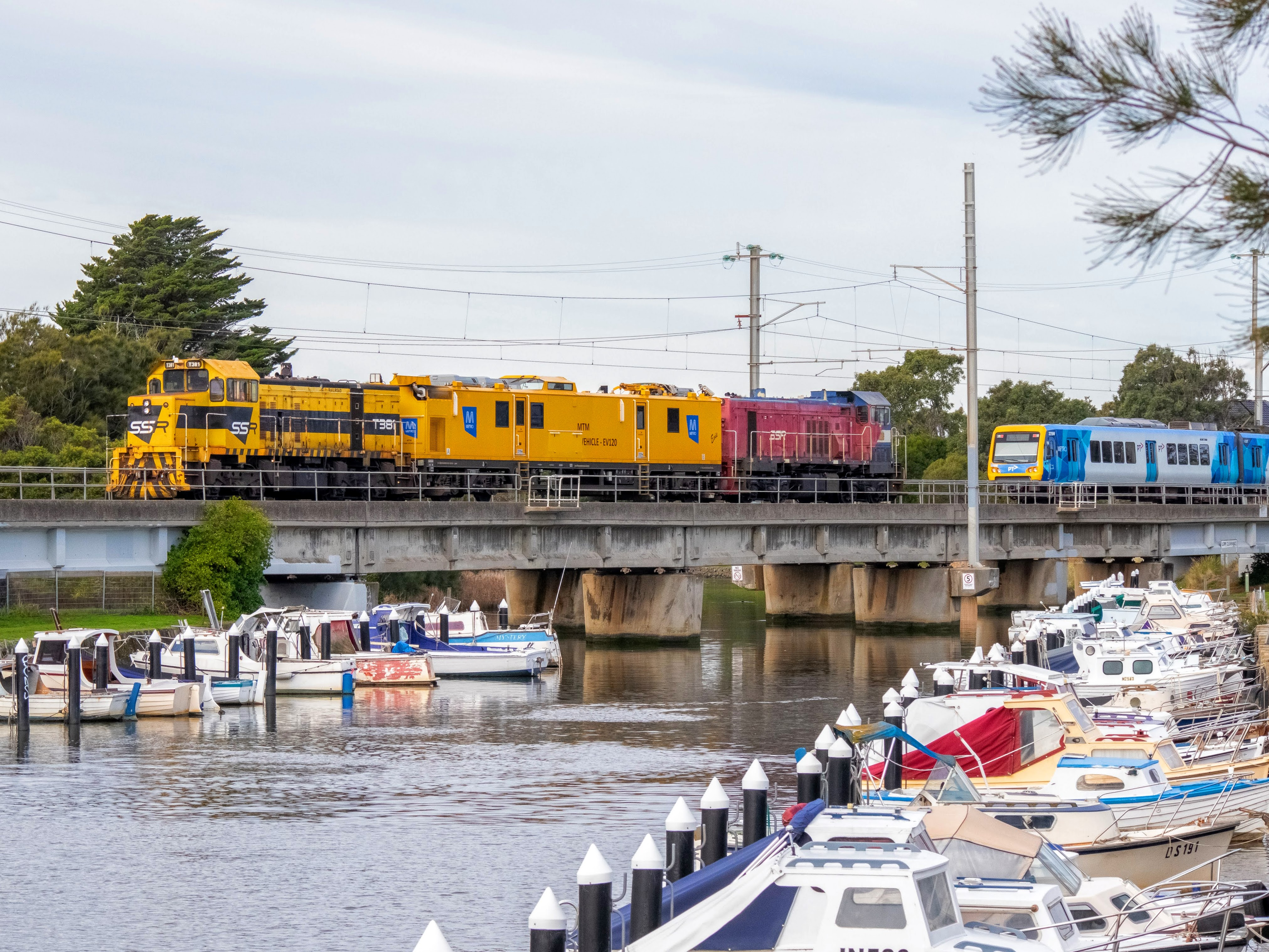
An infrastructure evaluation carriage being hauled by a T-class diesel electric locomotive.

Previously, the Pakenham line was served by a fleet of Comeng and Siemens Nexas trains. The oldest Comeng trains (stage 1 and some stage 2) have been retired and scrapped as part of the HCMT introduction, however, some of these trains have been displaced onto other Melbourne metropolitan lines. In comparison, the Siemens Nexas trains have not been retired, instead being moved onto other lines to replace older Comeng sets. Since the end of 2022, the Pakenham line is almost exclusively operated by High Capacity Metro Trains.

Alongside the passenger trains, Pakenham line tracks and equipment are maintained by a fleet of engineering trains. The four types of engineering trains are: the shunting train; designed for moving trains along non-electrified corridors and for transporting other maintenance locomotives, for track evaluation; designed for evaluating track and its condition, the overhead inspection train; designed for overhead wiring inspection, and the infrastructure evaluation carriage designed for general infrastructure evaluation. Most of these trains are repurposed locomotives previously used by V/Line, Metro Trains, and the Southern Shorthaul Railroad.

=== Depot ===
Rolling stock on the Pakenham line is primarily served by the Pakenham East Depot located in the outer suburb of Pakenham East. This depot was built in 2018 to exclusively house and maintain 30 brand new High Capacity Metro Trains while they are out of service. Built by Evolution Rail, the 118 hectares (290 acres) depot consists of a stabling yard and an advanced driver training simulator.

=== Signalling ===
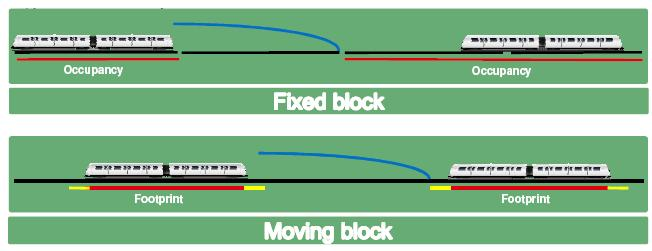
A diagram demonstrating the difference between fixed and moving blocked signalling.

Since the mid to late 20th century, the Pakenham line has used a fixed block three position signalling system designed for lower frequencies and less services. However, the ageing system had undermined reliability due to the presence of system faults and limited frequencies, requiring the Pakenham, Cranbourne, and Sunbury lines to upgrade their signalling system. Since 2021, high-capacity signalling (HCS) has been rolling out on the Pakenham, Cranbourne, and Sunbury lines, allowing trains to safely run closer together and run more frequently. The new system is being delivered by CPB Contractors and Bombardier Transportation under the Rail Systems Alliance. These works valued at $1 billion includes the roll-out of 55 kilometres (34 mi) of HCS and communications systems on the aforementioned lines, allowing an increase in reliability and frequency. The line will be equipped with Bombardier's CityFlo 650 communications-based train control system, that will enable operation at 2–3 minute headways.

The upgrading works were completed in phases from 2021. With the upgraded signalling system, trains are now able to run closer to each other. The new system was tested on the Mernda line and a section of the Cranbourne line before being fully implemented on the lines. In March 2022, the Pakenham line underwent further testing of high-tech signalling equipment, to ensure the new trains and signalling system can safely run alongside older-generation trains—including freight and V/Line trains—and the existing signalling system.

=== Stations facilities ===
==== Customer service ====
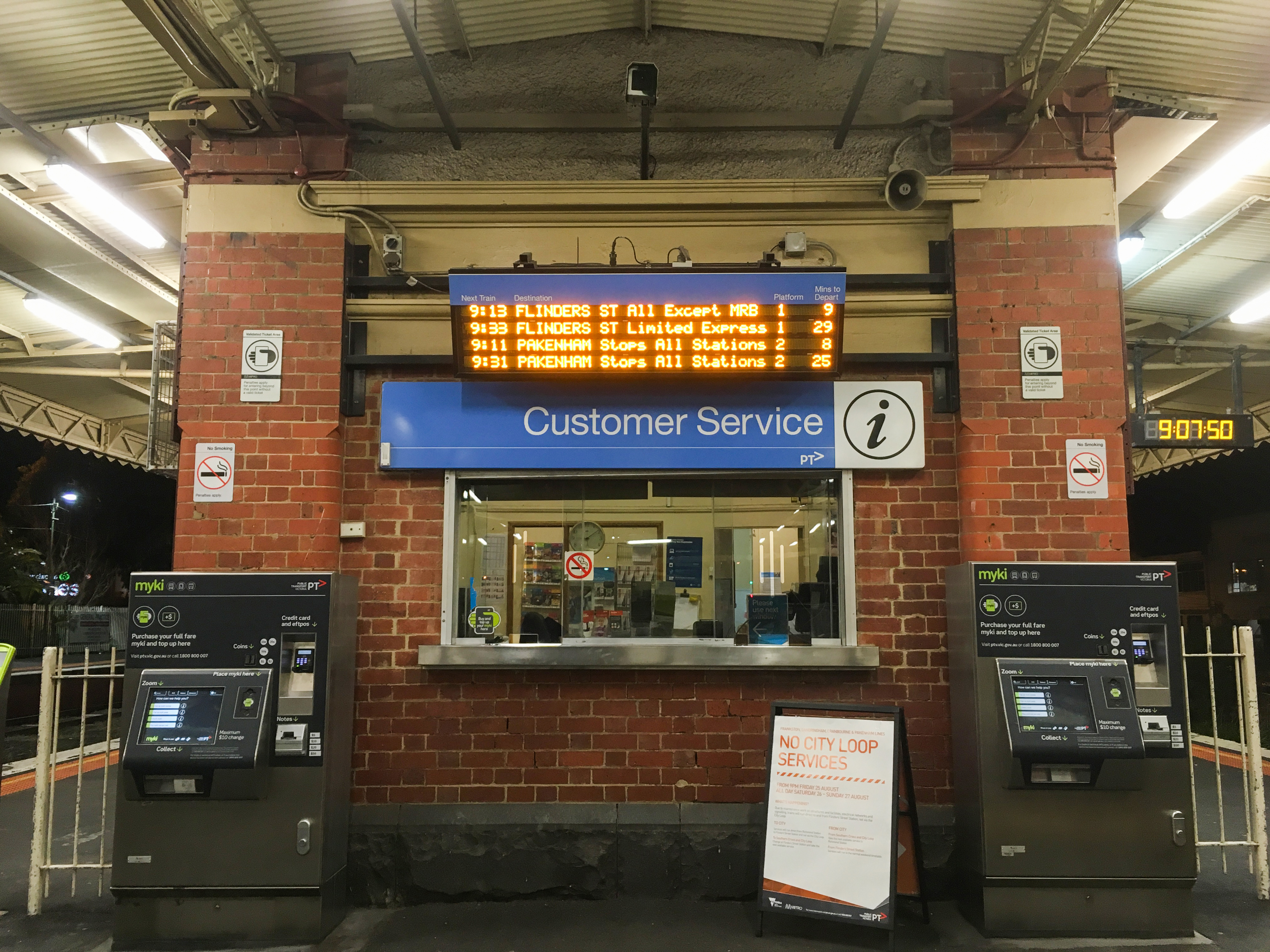
Customer service centre at the former platforms 1 and 2 at Oakleigh railway station

All premium railway stations on the Pakenham line have customer service centres that are open from the first to the last service. Host stations on the line also have customer service centres, however these are only staffed for a few hours during the morning peak.

At the service centres, passengers can:

- Buy tickets (Myki)
- Pick up timetables
- Collect change for vending machines and payphones

==== Accessibility ====
In compliance with the Disability Discrimination Act of 1992, all stations that are new-built or rebuilt are fully accessible and comply with these guidelines. The majority of stations on the corridor are fully accessible, however, there are some stations that haven't been upgraded to meet these guidelines. These stations do feature ramps, however, they have a gradient greater than 1 in 14. Stations that are fully accessible feature ramps that have a gradient less than 1 in 14, have at-grade paths, or feature lifts. These stations typically also feature tactile boarding indicators, independent boarding ramps, wheelchair accessible myki barriers, hearing loops, and widened paths.

Projects improving station accessibility have included the Level Crossing Removal Project that involves station rebuilds and upgrades, individual station upgrade projects, and associated Metro Tunnel works. These works have made significant strides in improving network accessibility, with more than 60% of Pakenham line stations classed as fully accessible. This number is expected to grow within the coming years, as a network restructure associated with the opening of the Metro Tunnel is completed and level crossing removal works are completed on the corridor by 2025.

==== Passenger information displays ====
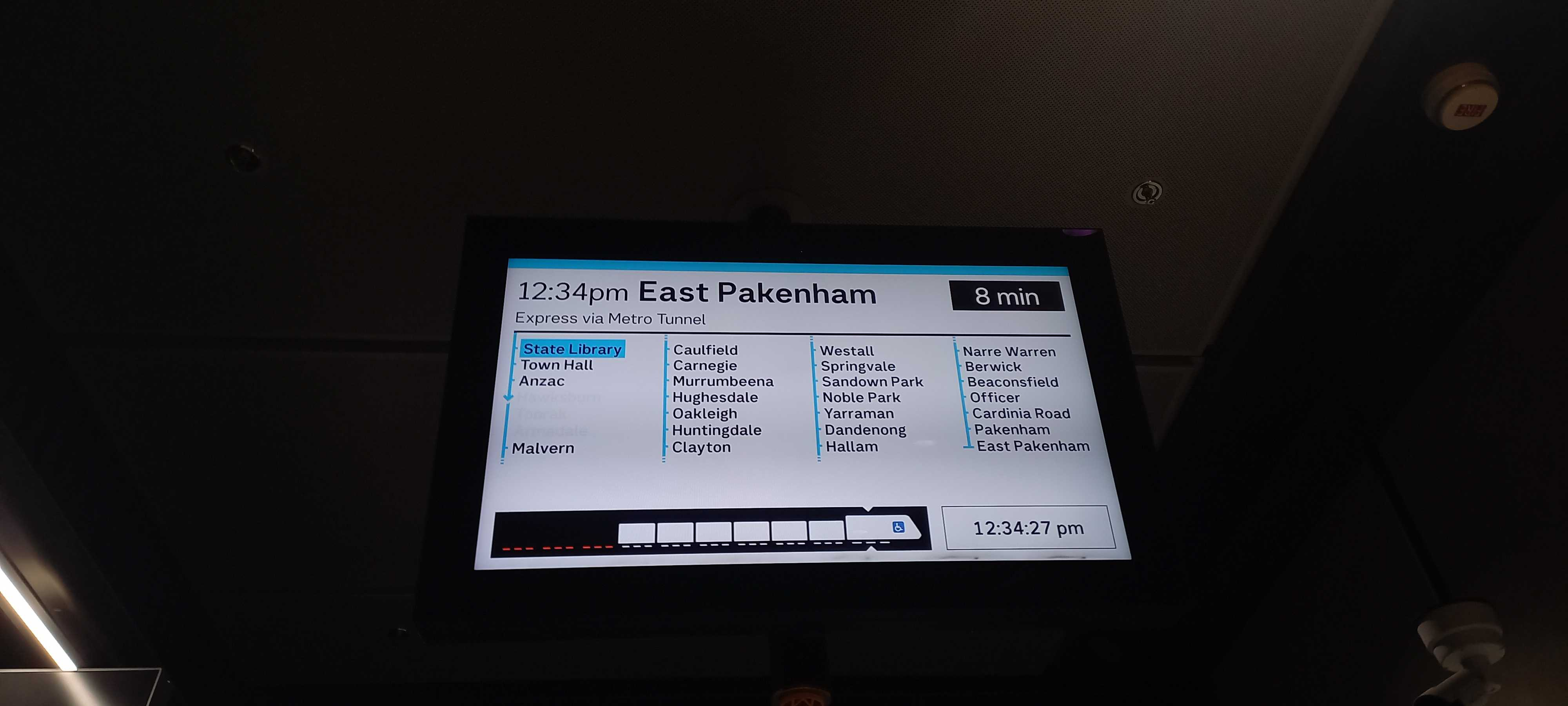
The 12:34 East Pakenham service departing in 8 minutes at State Library Station.

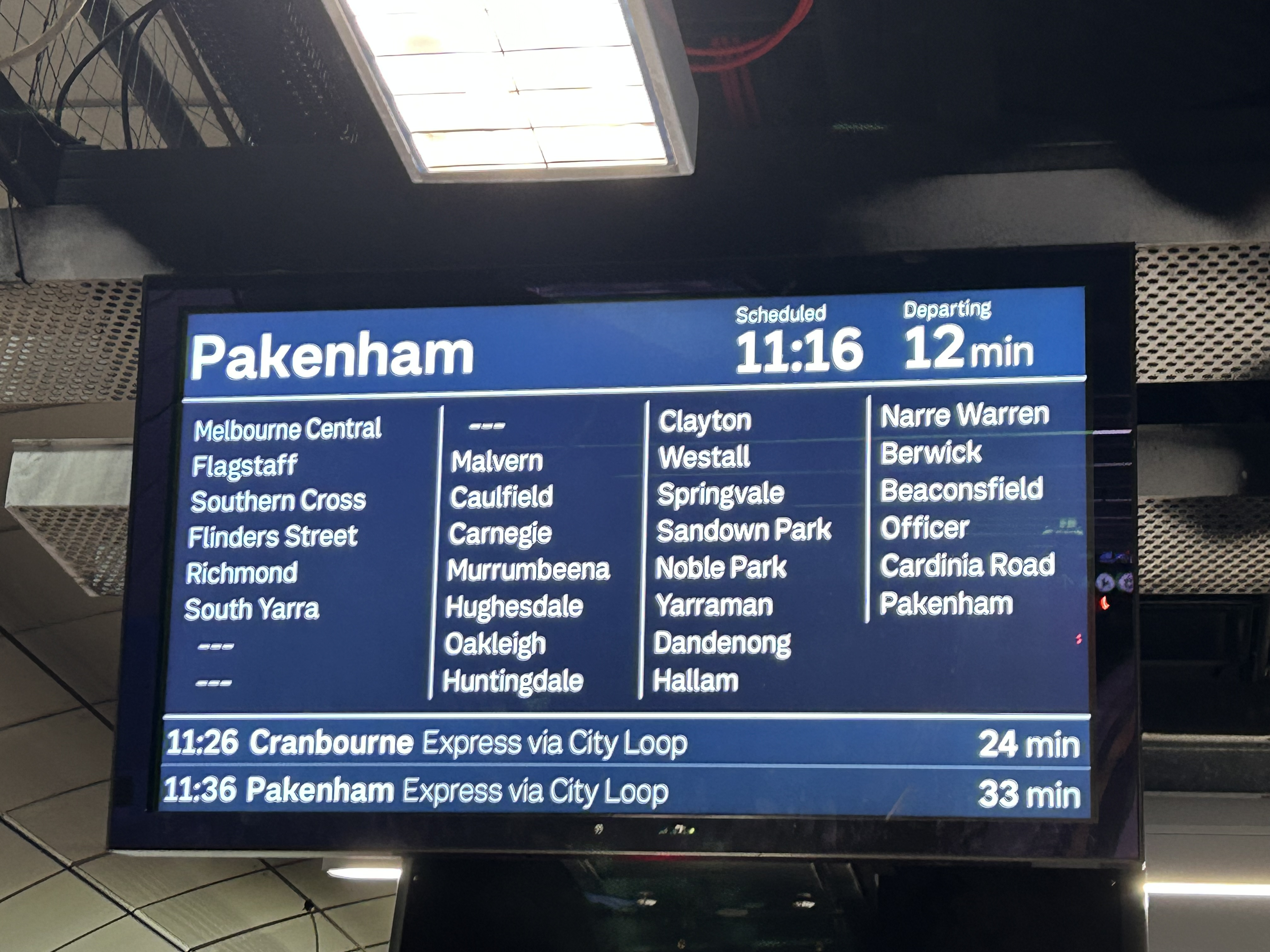
A display showing a Pakenham bound service arriving in 12 minutes at Parliament station

Most stations on the Pakenham line are equipped with passenger information displays which provide real time departure information. These displays are owned by Public Transport Victoria and are managed by Metro Trains Melbourne. With the exception of the five central stations, most stations on the network are equipped with 2 line LED displays. However, since 2016 these are being replaced by flat screen displays that additionally show every station the train will serve.

== Future ==
=== Metro Tunnel ===
The map of the Metro Tunnel route through the Melbourne central business district.

The 2012 Network Development Plan identified the need for a north–south tunnel connecting the Cranbourne and Pakenham lines to the Sunbury line. In 2017, the Metro Tunnel began construction, involving the construction of five new underground stations, twin 9-kilometre (5.6 mi) tunnels, and other associated infrastructure improvements. Leaving the existing Pakenham line alignment before South Yarra station, stations were built at Anzac, Town Hall (with connections to Flinders Street), State Library (with connections to Melbourne Central), Parkville, and Arden, before continuing onto the Sunbury line. These works were completed on 30 November 2025 for the Summer Start, where trains run through the Metro Tunnel from 10am to 3pm between Westall and West Footscray on weekdays, and from 10am to 7pm on weekends, with limited services extending all the way to Sunbury and East Pakenham on weekends. Summer Start services are operated alongside normal timetabled services. Upon the Big Switch on 1 February, a singular rail line from Cranbourne and East Pakenham to Sunbury will be created, with plans to connect to Melbourne Airport (from 2033), Melton and Wyndham Vale.

=== Melbourne Airport rail link ===
The Melbourne Airport rail link will involve the construction of a 27-kilometre (17 mi) line from Sunshine to a new station at Melbourne Airport. Connected via the Metro Tunnel, services will operate from the Cranbourne and Pakenham lines through the tunnel before splitting off at Sunshine to either Sunbury or Melbourne Airport. Construction of the line will involve the renovation of Sunshine station to allow for additional platforms, construction of new track, and the addition of two new stations at Keilor East and Melbourne Airport. Construction started in 2022 with services expected to begin in 2033.

=== Level crossing removals ===
The Level Crossing Removal Project has announced the removal of all 22 remaining level crossings on the Pakenham line, to be completed in stages from 2018 to 2025. All level crossings between Caulfield and Dandenong were removed in 2018 as part of the Caulfield to Dandenong skyrail project. This included the removal of nine level crossings and the reconstruction of five elevated stations along the corridor. The second phase of removals involves removing individual crossings along the corridor through a variety of methods by 2025. Some crossings have been removed through elevating the rail corridor, some by lowering or raising the road, with other crossings being removed by closing the crossing off from motor traffic. There have been two petitions to the Victorian Government to halt the closure of Progress Street in Dandenong, where local businesses have argued there are safety and congestion concerns, These projects will leave the entirety of the Pakenham line level crossing free by 2025, with projects on the Sunbury line leaving the entire Sunshine-Dandenong corridor crossing free by the opening of the Metro Tunnel in 2025.
