= Westfield Fountain Gate =

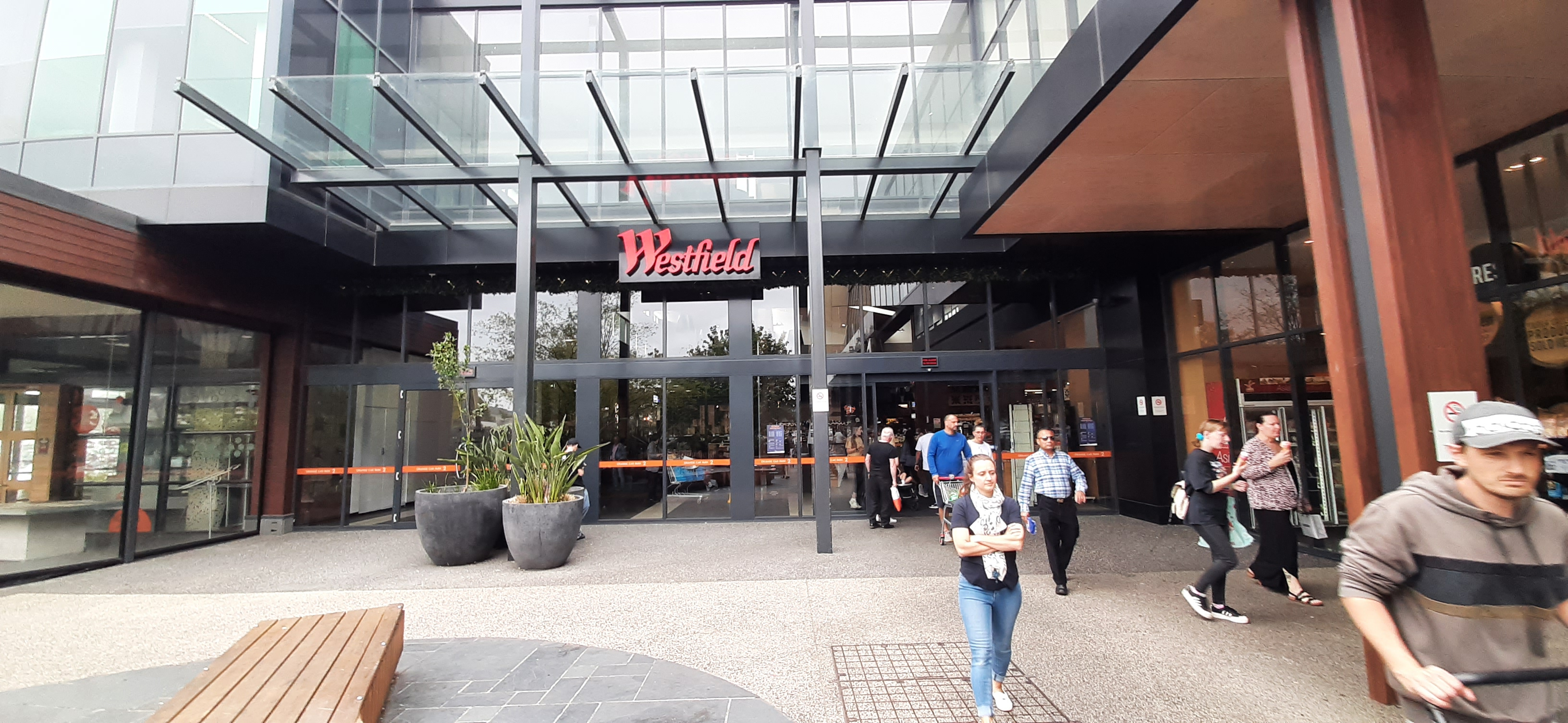
- Location: Narre Warren, Victoria, Australia
- Coordinates: 38°1′7″S 145°18′15″E
- Opened: 11 March 1980
- Manager: Scentre Group
- Owner: Scentre Group
- Num. of stores: 465
- Num. of anchor tenants: 13
- Floor area: 177,755 m2
- Floors: 2
- Parking: 6,493
- Website: westfield.com.au/fountaingate

Westfield Fountain Gate is a super-regional shopping centre located in Narre Warren in the south-eastern suburbs of Melbourne, Australia. It is the second largest shopping centre in Australia by both floor area and number of anchor tenants. However, it is one of the largest shopping centres in Australia with all 3 discount department stores, Big W, Target and Kmart.

== History ==
Fountain Gate Shopping Centre, constructed by Overland Construction Corporation, was inaugurated by the Governor of Victoria, Henry Winneke, on 11 March 1980. Initially, the centre boasted two major retailers: Kmart and Coles New World. Alongside them were 48 other shops and the Hotel Fountain Gate, a pub and restaurant. In 1984, a Safeway supermarket was erected to the south of Kmart, enriching the centre's offerings.

The evolution continued in 1988 with the addition of a second floor to the shopping complex. This expansion welcomed a Forges department store (now Target), a Harry Heath’s Supermarket (later replaced with a relocated Coles New World), a food court, and an array of 40 more shops. The following September saw the inauguration of the adjacent homemaker centre.

The centre underwent significant redevelopment when it was acquired by the Westfield Group in July 1995. This redevelopment transformed the centre into a much larger complex, culminating in 2001. Notable additions included a new eastern wing on the ground floor, featuring a revamped food court, an entertainment precinct housing a Village cinema, a Big W department store, an Aldi supermarket, a relocated Safeway (later rebranded as Woolworths), and various specialty shops. Additionally, a Bi-Lo supermarket was added to the second floor alongside an array of more shops.

Furthermore, the former Safeway premises were repurposed to accommodate additional stores, including The Reject Shop, a Dimmeys (later replaced with Harris Scarfe), an Australia Post office, and various other shops.

A major expansion of the complex took place between 2011 and 2012. Approved by the City of Casey in December 2007, the extension featured a new two-level 12,000m^{2} Myer store, a new 4,200m^{2} Coles store, in a new location near the former Bi-Lo, with the existing store shell being reconfigured with space for two new minor anchor stores, as well as providing increased retail space for Target, which increased from 6,884m^{2} to 8,368m^{2}. David Jones had been set to open a store in the new expansion but terminated the contract with Westfield in July 2010, with Myer replacing David Jones in the expansion. David Jones had been trying to exit its contract with Westfield Group since 2003 as Fountain Gate did not fit the company's strategy or target demographic. Four new minor anchor retail spaces were constructed, as well as 114 new specialty store spaces and 1,500 new car parking spaces, with new ground-level parking surrounding the centre and new rooftop parking above the new mall areas.

It is the location of the first-ever Krispy Kreme in Victoria.

A new building has been added to the complex which is the City of Casey's new entertainment precinct, it is the creative and community heart of the region. This is the new home of the Narre Warren Library.

== In popular culture ==
Fountain Gate Shopping Centre is named as the mall frequented by the characters in the popular television series Kath & Kim. Scenes in the show were filmed at Fountain Gate and at Westfield Southland.

Fountain Gate Shopping Centre was a filming location in the feature film Bad Eggs where, in the first scene, a car rolls into the actual shopping centre; in the film, the mall is named Crystal Heights Shop Kingdom.

== Transport ==
Narre Warren railway station is approximately 1 km away from the centre and is linked by a number of bus routes to Westfield Fountain Gate. Some regional buses also stop at Fountain Gate.

The Hallam Bypass, a new section of the Monash Freeway opened in 2003, passes beside the complex and can be viewed from the windows in the food court.A trail known as the Hallam Bypass Trail, constructed at the same time, runs beside the centre on the north-east side, providing access for cyclists and pedestrians.
