= East Pakenham railway station =

Railway station in Victoria, Australia

East Pakenham
- Station pedestrian underpass and entrance, November 2026

General information
- Location: Sharnet Circuit; Pakenham, Victoria 3810; Shire of Cardinia; Australia
- Coordinates: 38°05′05″S 145°30′29″E
- System: PTV commuter rail station
- Owner: VicTrack
- Operator: Metro Trains
- Line: Pakenham
- Distance: 60.03 kilometres from Southern Cross
- Platforms: 2 (1 island)
- Tracks: 4

Construction
- Structure type: Ground
- Parking: 300 spaces
- Cycle facilities: Available
- Accessible: Yes—step free access

Other information
- Status: Operational, premium station
- Station code: EPH
- Fare zone: Myki zone 2
- Website: Public Transport Victoria

History
- Opened: 3 June 2024; 2 years ago
- Electrified: 1500 V DC overhead

Passengers
- 2023–2024: 3,700
- 2024–2025: 54,500 ▲1372.97%

Services
Preceding station	Metro Trains	Following station
Pakenham towards Watergardens or Sunbury via Metro Tunnel	Pakenham line	Terminus
Disruptions only
Preceding station	V/Line	Following station
Terminus	Gippsland line	Nar Nar Goon towards Traralgon or Bairnsdale
Track layout
Location

East Pakenham station is a railway station operated by Metro Trains Melbourne and the terminus of the Pakenham line, part of the Melbourne rail network. It serves the south-eastern Melbourne suburb of Pakenham and the nearby suburb of Pakenham East in Victoria, Australia. Opened on 3 June 2024, East Pakenham is a ground-level premium station, which means that it is staffed throughout the day. The station has an island platform and bypass tracks for V/Line regional services.

East Pakenham station was constructed at the same time as a rebuild of Pakenham station, as part of the Level Crossing Removal Project. Until mid-2023, the state government referred to the station as Pakenham East railway station.

== History ==
The Gippsland railway line opened through the East Pakenham site on 8 October 1877 when the line was extended from Pakenham to Bunyip.

The line was originally built as single track until duplication from Pakenham to Nar Nar Goon was completed on 10 October 1954 as part of a wider duplication scheme from Melbourne to Moe.

Electrification was provided on the Gippsland line from Dandenong to Warragul on 21 July 1954, extended to Moe on 19 October 1955 and finally Traralgon on 15 March 1956. This was to allow a higher volume of trains to run on the line to Yallorn as during the mid 20th century, Yallourn was the site of lots of Brown coal and Briquette mines.

As production declined and the rolling stock for electric traction aged it was decided in 1987 to withdraw and replace the electric locomotives with new V/Line N class with electrification beyond Warragul decommissioned on 2 July 1987. Between then and 1998, select suburban services on the Pakenham line would continue onto Warragul however these services ceased on 7 December 1998.

East Pakenham station was announced in February 2021. It was designed to remove a major bottleneck where through V/Line trains and terminating Metro trains were required to use the same tracks at the old Pakenham station. The new station provides separate turnback tracks for Metro trains and dedicated V/Line bypass tracks, avoiding congestion and improving service reliability.

On 10 October 2022, the up and down Gippsland line tracks (current down stopping and bypass tracks) were slewed to the north to allow space for the island platforms and up tracks to be built.

On 3 June 2024, East Pakenham station opened to passengers at the same time as the rebuilt elevated Pakenham station.

== Platforms and services ==
East Pakenham has one island platform with two faces. It is served by Pakenham line trains.

East Pakenham platform arrangement
Platform	Line	Destination	Via	Service Pattern	Notes	Source
1	Pakenham line	West Footscray, Watergardens, Sunbury	Town Hall	Limited express services	Services to West Footscray only operate during weekday peaks.	
2	Pakenham line	West Footscray, Watergardens, Sunbury	Town Hall	Limited express services	Services to West Footscray only operate during weekday peaks.	
