= Heyington railway station =

Railway station in Melbourne, Australia

Heyington
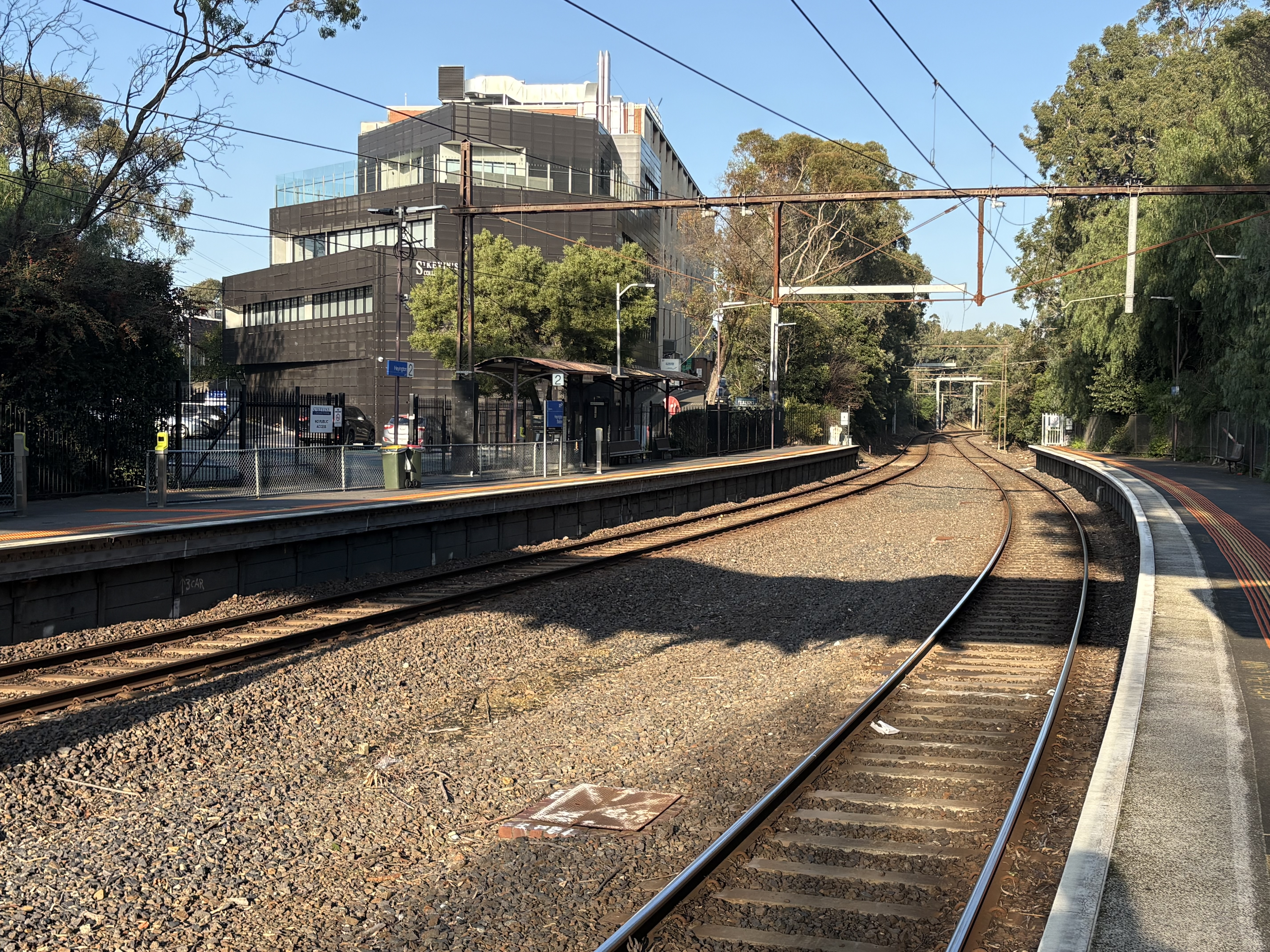
- Eastbound view of the station, June 2026

General information
- Location: Heyington Place, Toorak, Victoria 3142; City of Stonnington; Australia
- Coordinates: 37°50′05″S 145°01′22″E
- System: PTV commuter rail station
- Owner: VicTrack
- Operator: Metro Trains
- Line: Glen Waverley
- Distance: 7.12 kilometres from Southern Cross
- Platforms: 2 side
- Tracks: 2

Construction
- Structure type: Ground
- Accessible: No—stairs required

Other information
- Status: Operational, unstaffed
- Station code: HEY
- Fare zone: Myki zone 1
- Website: Public Transport Victoria

History
- Opened: 24 March 1890; 136 years ago
- Rebuilt: 1975
- Electrified: December 1922 (1500 V DC overhead)

Passengers
- 2005–2006: 225,915
- 2006–2007
- 2007–2008
- 2008–2009
- 2009–2010
- 2010–2011
- 2011–2012
- 2012–2013
- 2013–2014
- 2014–2015
- 2015–2016
- 2016–2017
- 2017–2018
- 2018–2019
- 2019–2020
- 2020–2021
- 2021–2022
- 2022–2023
- 2023–2024
- 2024–2025

Services
Preceding station	Metro Trains	Following station
Burnley towards Flinders Street	Glen Waverley line	Kooyong towards Glen Waverley
Track layout
Location

Heyington station is a railway station operated by Metro Trains Melbourne on the Glen Waverley line, which is part of the Melbourne rail network. It serves the eastern suburb of Toorak, in Melbourne, Victoria, Australia. Heyington station is a ground level staffed station, featuring two side platforms. It opened on 24 March 1890, with the current station provided in 1975.

The station does not have any transport connections unlike the majority of Melbourne train stations. The journey to Southern Cross railway station is approximately 7.12 kilometres (4.42 mi) and takes 25 minutes.

== Description ==
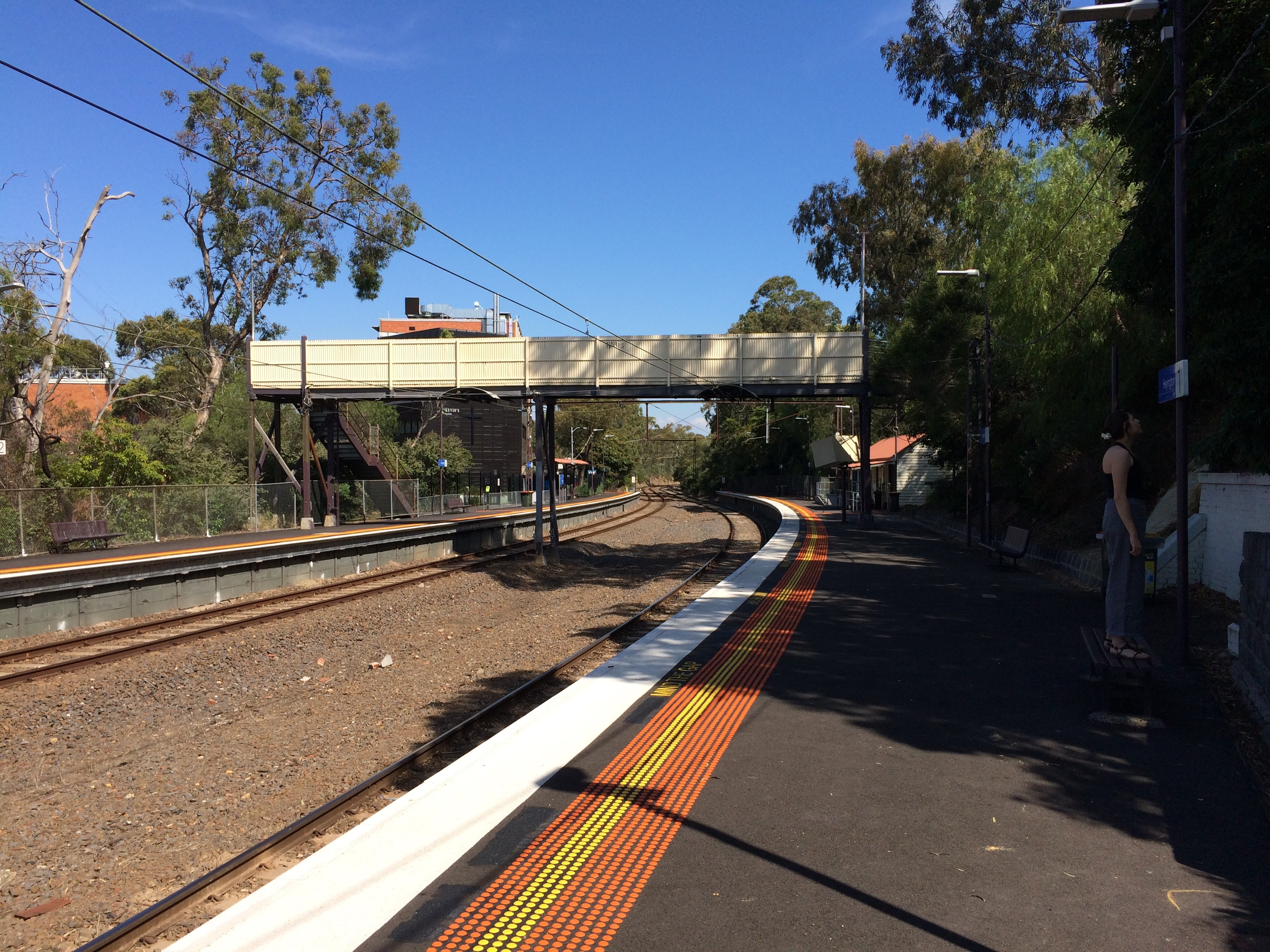
The footbridge with stair only access

Heyington railway station located in the suburb of Toorak, a suburb of Melbourne, Victoria. North of the station is the Yarra River and east of the station is St Kevin's College. The station is owned by VicTrack, a state government agency, and the station is operated by Metro Trains. The station is 7.12 kilometres (4.42 mi), or a 15-minute train journey, from Southern Cross station. The adjacent stations are Burnley station up towards Melbourne, and Kooyong station down towards Glen Waverley.

The station consists of two side platforms two platform edges. Standard in Melbourne, the platform has an asphalt surface with concrete on the edges. The platforms are approximately 160 metres (524 ft 11 in) long, enough for a Metro Trains 7-car HCMT. The station features one main station building, located on platform 1. This building acts as toilet, automated ticketing, and PSO facilities. The station building is made from wood and ribbed metal roofing.

The station building, concourse, and platform are largely the same as when the station was rebuilt in 1975. There is no bike or car parking are available at the station. The station is the only one in Melbourne accessed solely by stairs, with both platforms requiring stair access from the pedestrian footbridge.

== History ==
Heyington railway station was opened on 24 March 1890 with the line through the station originally built to link Burnley to the Outer Circle line at Waverley Road, before continuing onto Oakleigh. The station was named after nearby Heyington Place, which provides access to the station. The line underwent numerous extensions over its life, with extensions to East Malvern in 1929 and to Glen Waverley in 1930. In 1926, duplication of the line between Heyington and Burnley stations occurred, with duplication between Heyington and Kooyong stations occurring in 1955. Duplication of the line to Darling occurred in 1956, with the line fully duplicated to Glen Waverley by 1964. In 1969, the current overpass, located just beyond the up end of the station, was provided.

In 1975, the current station building on Platform 1 was provided, with parcel facilities also being abolished around this time. On 23 June 1979, the new station building was partially damaged by fire. Minor upgrades have occurred at the station since 1975, with a new roof installed on the Platform 1 station structure in 2022 and other technological, safety, and signage upgrades.

=== February 2014 fatality ===
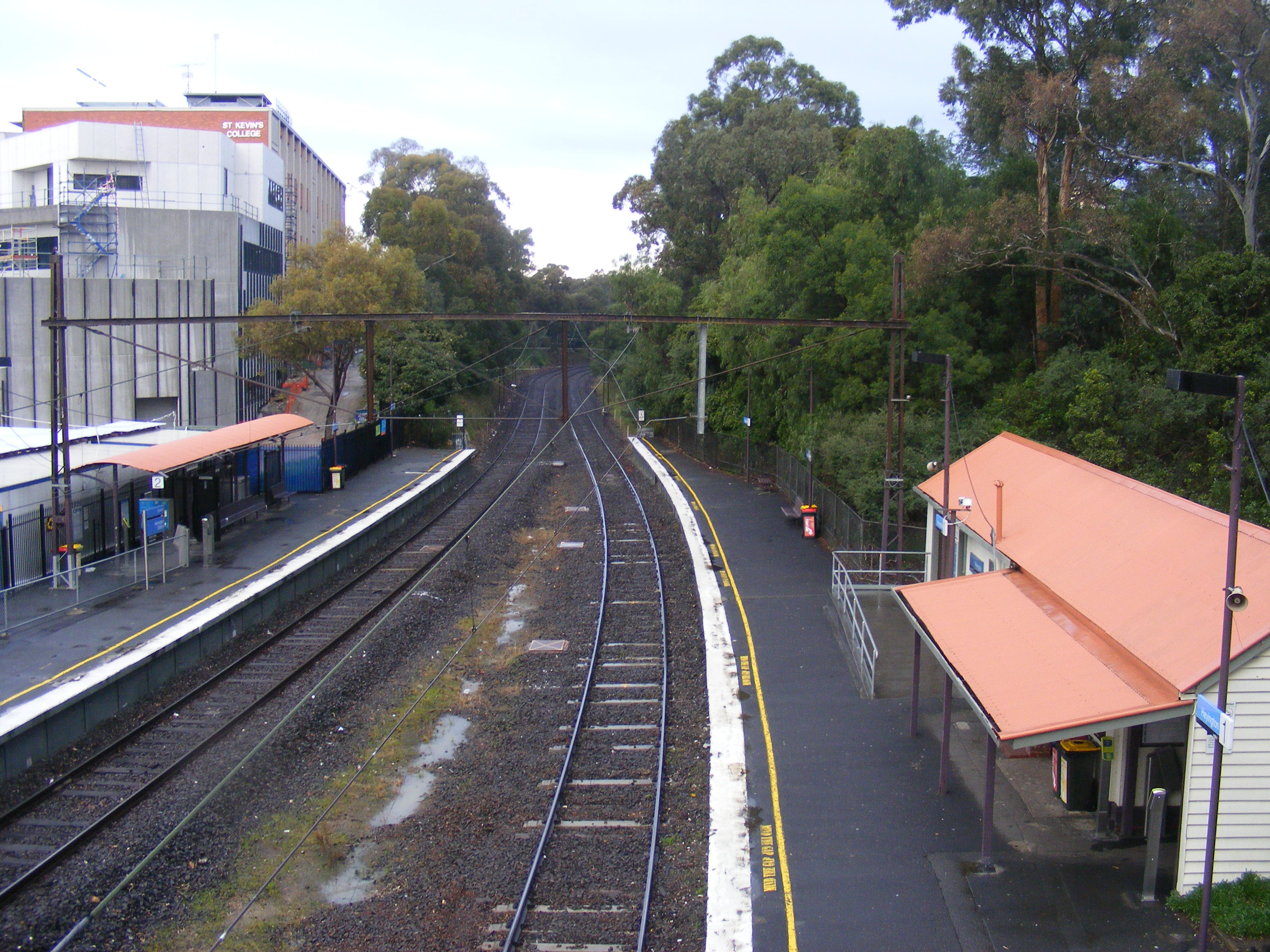
The station platforms in the setup that they were in at the time of the accident, 2007

On 22 February 2014, an 18 year old male was fatally injured when he fell between a moving train and the platform. He was running alongside the moving train when he fell attempting to board it, while passengers inside the train were forcibly holding the carriage doors open. An Australian Transport Safety Bureau (ATSB) report found that due to the pressure applied by passengers, the traction interlock system (as designed) automatically deactivated after a period of time. This allowed traction to be applied and the train to depart with the carriage doors open. Large platform gaps as a result of platform curvature also contributed to the accident. The report found a total of four main issues, those being the inadequacy of the doors open warning device, the standards for train and platform clearances, the ability for the train to move with the carriage doors open, and the platform clearances. In a bid to prevent further fatalities from arising, Metro Trains Melbourne (MTM) has realigned the track at Heyington station and installed rubber "bridges" along the entire edge of the platform face. Furthermore, a barrier has also been installed at the platform entrance to deter passengers from running for the train.

On the wider network, MTM has also completed a survey of all stations with curved track and platforms that are at a higher risk of an issue occurring. In the short term, these platforms have had 'Mind the Gap' signs painted on them with the addition of announcement to alert passengers of the presence of a gap. In the long term, plans and strategies have been adopted to remove these safety issues permanently from the network.

== Platforms and services ==
Heyington has two side platforms with two faces. The station is currently served by the Glen Waverley line—a service on the metropolitan rail network. The Glen Waverley line runs from Glen Waverley station south east of Melbourne, joining the Belgrave, Lilydale, and Alamein lines at Burnley station before travelling through the city loop.

Heyington platform arrangement
Platform	Line	Destination	Service Type	Source
1	Glen Waverley line	Flinders Street	All stations and limited express services	
2	Glen Waverley line	Glen Waverley	All stations	

== Transport links ==
Rare amongst Melbourne train stations, Heyington station has no other transport connections. There are some transport connections on Toorak Road, however, these are over 200 metres (220 yd) away from the station. Heyington station does however have train replacement bus stops located adjacent to the station.
