= Glen Iris railway station =

Railway station in Melbourne, Australia

Glen Iris
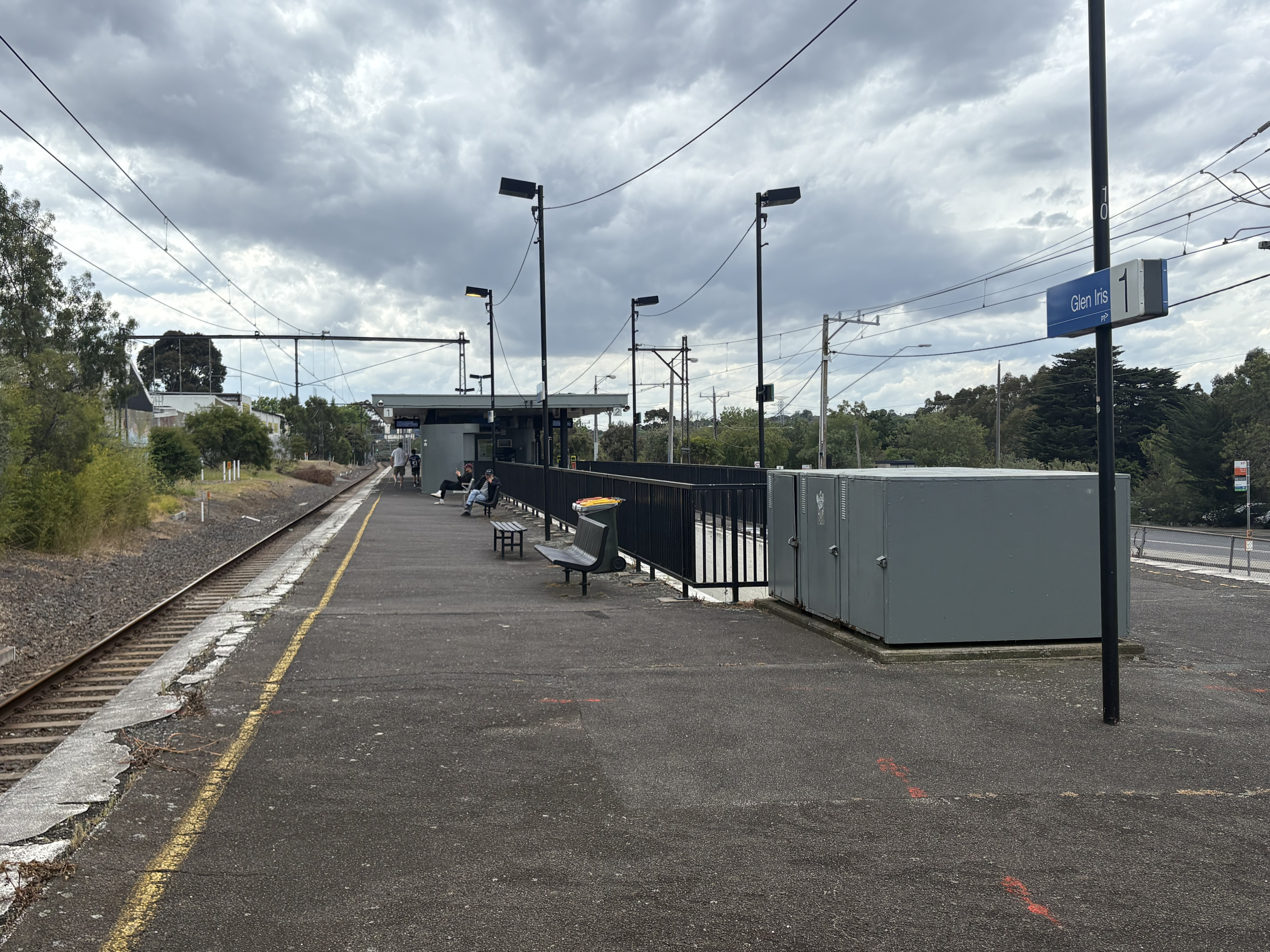
- Westbound view from Platform 1, November 2025

General information
- Location: High Street, Glen Iris, Victoria 3146; City of Stonnington; Australia
- Coordinates: 37°51′33″S 145°03′29″E
- System: PTV commuter rail station
- Owner: VicTrack
- Operator: Metro Trains
- Line: Glen Waverley
- Distance: 11.52 kilometres from Southern Cross
- Platforms: 2 (1 island)
- Tracks: 2
- Connections: Bus; Tram

Construction
- Structure type: Ground level
- Parking: 50
- Accessible: No—steep ramp

Other information
- Status: Operational, unstaffed
- Station code: GIR
- Fare zone: Myki zone 1
- Website: Public Transport Victoria

History
- Opened: 24 March 1890; 136 years ago
- Rebuilt: 1975
- Electrified: December 1922 (1500 V DC overhead)

Passengers
- 2005–2006: 349,490
- 2006–2007: 387,354 ▲10.83%
- 2007–2008: 412,838 ▲6.58%
- 2008–2009: 374,709 ▼9.24%
- 2009–2010: 377,614 ▲0.77%
- 2010–2011: 397,154 ▲5.17%
- 2011–2012: 363,548 ▼8.46%
- 2012–2013: Not Measured
- 2013–2014: 313,773 ▼13.69%
- 2014–2015: 295,449 ▼5.84%
- 2015–2016: 279,026 ▼5.56%
- 2016–2017: 319,747 ▲14.59%
- 2017–2018: 331,492 ▲3.67%
- 2018–2019: 330,100 ▼0.42%
- 2019–2020: 253,400 ▼23.24%
- 2020–2021: 118,200 ▼53.4%
- 2021–2022: 148,050 ▲25.25%
- 2022–2023: 247,850 ▲67.41%
- 2023–2024: 268,850 ▲8.47%
- 2024–2025: 261,300 ▼2.81%

Services
Preceding station	Metro Trains	Following station
Gardiner towards Flinders Street	Glen Waverley line	Darling towards Glen Waverley
Track layout
Location

Glen Iris station is a railway station operated by Metro Trains Melbourne on the Glen Waverley line, part of the Melbourne rail network. It serves Glen Iris, a suburb of Melbourne, Victoria, Australia. The station opened on 24 March 1890 as part of the branch line from Burnley to Waverley Road station. The station consists of one island platform accessed by a pedestrian underpass. There is one principal station building located towards the Down end of the platform. The single-story building, constructed in 1975 as part of the station's rebuild, acts as a shelter and has toilet facilities. The station is only partially accessible due to steep access ramps.

The station connects to the route 6 tram service and the routes 612 and 734 bus services as well. The journey to Southern Cross railway station is approximately 11.52 kilometres (7.16 mi) and takes 25 minutes.

== Description ==
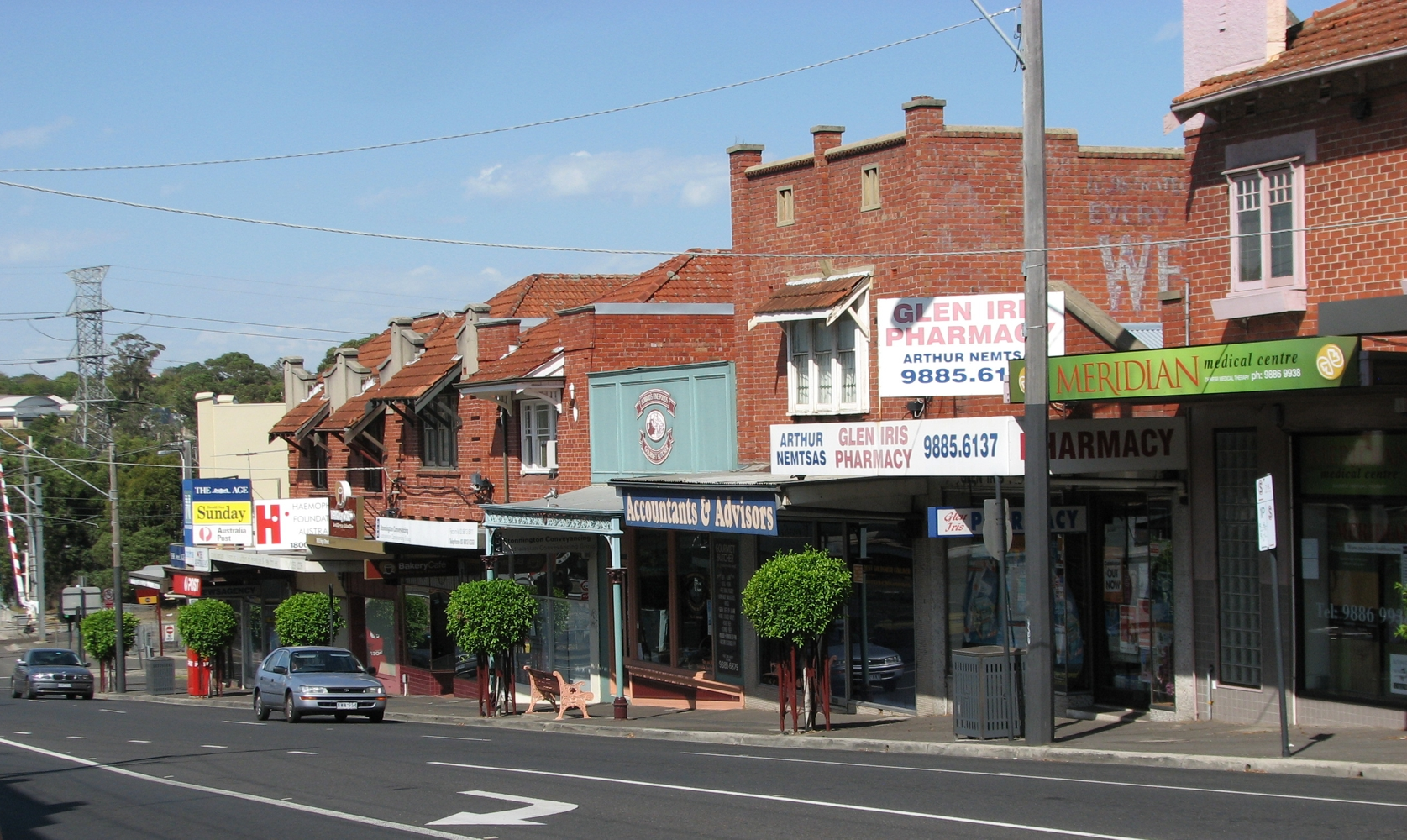
The High Street shopping precinct, located south of the station.

Glen Iris railway station is located in the suburb of Glen Iris, a suburb of Melbourne, Victoria. The station is located nearby to the High Street shopping precinct and the Glen Iris Wetlands. The station is owned by VicTrack, a state government agency, and the station is operated by Metro Trains. The station is approximately 11.52 kilometres (7.16 mi), or a 25-minute train journey, from Southern Cross station. The adjacent stations are Gardiner station, up towards Melbourne, and Darling station, down towards Glen Waverley.

The station consists of one island platform with a total of two platform edges. Standard in Melbourne, the platform has an asphalt surface with concrete on the edges. The platforms are approximately 160 metres (524 ft 11 in) long, enough for a Metro Trains 7 car HCMT. The station features a pedestrian underpass, accessed from the centre of the platforms by a ramp. The station features one principal station building present on the island platform, built in 1975. These buildings act as shelter and toilet facilities, and are constructed with painted wood, metal sheeting, and ribbed roofing panels.

The station building and platform are largely the same as when it was rebuilt in 1975, with the main change being updated signage and technology. The station features 50 car-parks on the north side of the station, with no secure bike parking available onsite. The station is listed as partially accessible due to steep access ramps.

== History ==
Glen Iris railway station was opened on 24 March 1890, with the line through the station originally built to link Burnley to the Outer Circle line at Waverley Road, before continuing onto Oakleigh. The station was named after a residence that was built by solicitor J.C. Turner. The land on which the residence was built was acquired by a local settler, who travelled to Victoria on a ship named Iris. The line underwent numerous extensions over its life, with extensions to East Malvern in 1929 and to Glen Waverley in 1930. In December 1922, the line through the station was electrified, with duplication of the line to Darling occurring in 1956. The line was fully duplicated to Glen Waverley by 1964.

In 1970, boom barriers replaced interlocked gates at the High Street level crossing, located at the down end of the station, with the signal box abolished also around this time. The station was rebuilt in 1975 to coincide with the construction of the South Eastern Arterial link, with parcel facilities abolished at this time. In 1992, pedestrian gates were provided at High Street—located just down from the station platforms. Minor upgrades have occurred at the station since 1975, primarily technological and signage upgrades.

On 3 March 2022, a serious incident occurred at the level crossing down from the station, with a car being stuck and causing the train to be damaged. Despite the lack of injuries, debate was reignited regarding the removal of the level crossing, with the creation of a community petition to campaign for the removal of the crossing. The Liberal Party promised to remove the crossing alongside others on the Glen Waverley line if elected in 2022, however, they weren't successful in their election bid.

== Platforms and services ==
Glen Iris has one island platform with two faces. The station is currently served by the Glen Waverley line — a service on the metropolitan rail network. The Glen Waverley line runs from Glen Waverley station south east of Melbourne, joining the Belgrave, Lilydale, and Alamein lines at Burnley station, before travelling through the City Loop.

Glen Iris platform arrangement
Platform	Line	Destination	Service Type	Source
1	Glen Waverley line	Flinders Street	All stations and limited express services	
2	Glen Waverley line	Glen Waverley	All stations	

== Transport links ==
Glen Iris station has one tram and two bus connections. The route 6 tram service operates from nearby High Street up towards Moreland station, with the service terminating at Glen Iris station. The station also connects to the route 612 bus service from Box Hill station to Chadstone Shopping Centre and route 734 to Glen Waverley station. The station has both an accessible platform tram stop and a bus interchange. The platform tram stop has shelters with electronic signage, with the bus interchange consisting of 4 unnumbered bays with shelters. Glen Iris station also has train replacement bus stops located adjacent to the station.

Tram connections:

- : to Moreland station

Bus connections:

- 612 : Box Hill station – Chadstone Shopping Centre
- 734 : to Glen Waverley station
