= Tooronga railway station =

Railway station in Melbourne, Australia

Tooronga
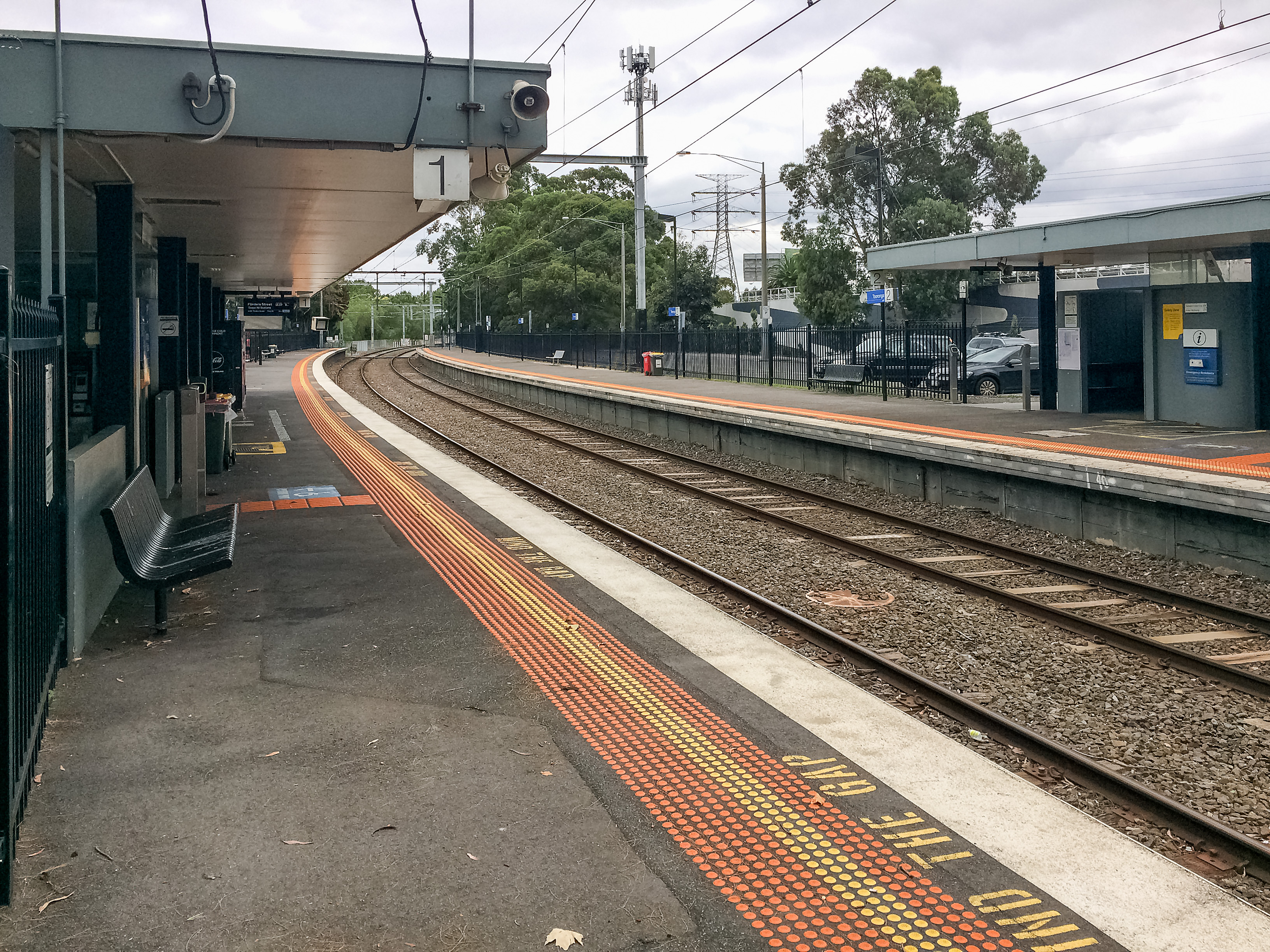
- North-west view from Platform 1, January 2021

General information
- Location: Milton Parade, Malvern, Victoria 3144; City of Stonnington; Australia
- Coordinates: 37°50′58″S 145°02′30″E
- System: PTV commuter rail station
- Owner: VicTrack
- Operator: Metro Trains
- Line: Glen Waverley
- Distance: 9.59 kilometres from Southern Cross
- Platforms: 2 side
- Tracks: 2
- Connections: Bus

Construction
- Structure type: Ground
- Parking: 189
- Cycle facilities: 11
- Accessible: Yes—step free access

Other information
- Status: Operational, host station
- Station code: TGA
- Fare zone: Myki zone 1
- Website: Public Transport Victoria

History
- Opened: 24 March 1890; 136 years ago
- Rebuilt: 20 November 1955; 1975
- Electrified: December 1922 (1500 V DC overhead)

Passengers
- 2005–2006: 421,639
- 2006–2007: 456,599 ▲8.29%
- 2007–2008: 490,356 ▲7.39%
- 2008–2009: 478,729 ▼2.37%
- 2009–2010: 486,046 ▲1.52%
- 2010–2011: 520,267 ▲7.04%
- 2011–2012: 514,741 ▼1.06%
- 2012–2013: Not measured
- 2013–2014: 652,633 ▲26.78%
- 2014–2015: 614,995 ▼5.76%
- 2015–2016: 603,752 ▼1.82%
- 2016–2017: 569,736 ▼5.63%
- 2017–2018: 576,709 ▲1.22%
- 2018–2019: 580,300 ▲0.62%
- 2019–2020: 456,150 ▼21.39%
- 2020–2021: 176,050 ▼61.4%
- 2021–2022: 228,050 ▲29.53%
- 2022–2023: 415,900 ▲82.37%
- 2023–2024: 467,850 ▲12.49%
- 2024–2025: 453,150 ▼3.14%

Services
| Preceding station | Metro Trains | Following station |
|---|---|---|
| Kooyong towards Flinders Street | Glen Waverley line | Gardiner towards Glen Waverley |
Track layout
Location

Tooronga station is a railway station operated by Metro Trains Melbourne on the Glen Waverley line, which is part of the Melbourne rail network. It serves the eastern suburb of Malvern, in Melbourne, Victoria, Australia. Tooronga station is a ground level unstaffed station, featuring two side platforms. It opened on 24 March 1890, with the current station provided in 1975.

== History ==
Tooronga station opened on 24 March 1890, when the railway line from Burnley was extended to Eastmalvern. The station is named after nearby Tooronga Road, which in turn was named after an adjacent two-story property. The word Tooronga is Indigenous, meaning "modern" or "new".

In 1955, the current station platforms were provided, when duplication of the line occurred between Kooyong and Gardiner.

In 1966, boom barriers replaced interlocked gates at the Tooronga Road level crossing, located at the down end of the station. The signal box protecting the level crossing and a goods yard were also abolished during that time.

In 1975, the current station buildings were provided.

== Platforms and services ==
Tooronga has two side platforms. It is served by Glen Waverley line trains.

Tooronga platform arrangement
| Platform | Line | Destination | Service Type | Source |
|---|---|---|---|---|
| 1 | Glen Waverley line | Flinders Street | All stations and limited express services | |
| 2 | Glen Waverley line | Glen Waverley | All stations | |

== Transport links ==
CDC Melbourne operates one bus route via Tooronga station, under contract to Public Transport Victoria:

- 624 : Kew – Oakleigh station

The bus stops outside the station are also used by bus replacement services for Glen Waverley line services.

== Gallery ==
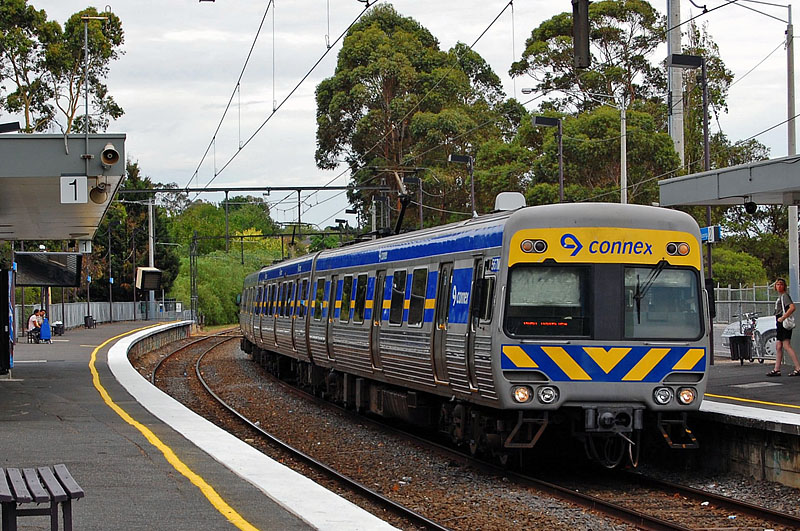
North-west view from Platform 1, with a Comeng train arriving on Platform 2, January 2007
