= Holmesglen =

Holmesglen may refer to:

- Holmesglen Institute of TAFE, an educational institution in Melbourne, Australia
- Holmesglen railway station, a railway station in Melbourne, Australia
