= Richmond Park railway station =

Former railway station in Victoria, Australia

Coordinates: 37°49′48″S 145°1′13″E

Richmond Park

General information
- Line: Glen Iris

Other information
- Status: Closed

History
- Opened: Never opened

Services
Preceding station	Disused railways	Following station
Burnley	Glen Iris line	Heyington
	List of closed railway stations in Melbourne	
Location

Richmond Park was a railway station of the Darling (now Glen Waverley) line in Melbourne, Australia. The station was situated between Burnley railway station and Heyington railway station. The station was built 24 March 1890, with the rest of the line to Darling, but never opened. The station was located in Richmond Park.
