= Kooyong =

Kooyong may refer to:

- Kooyong, Victoria, a suburb of Melbourne
  - Kooyong railway station
- Division of Kooyong, an electoral district in the Australian House of Representatives in Victoria
- Kooyong Classic, tennis event held at Kooyong Stadium
- Kooyong Stadium, tennis venue in the suburb
