= Syndal railway station =

Railway station in Melbourne, Australia

Syndal
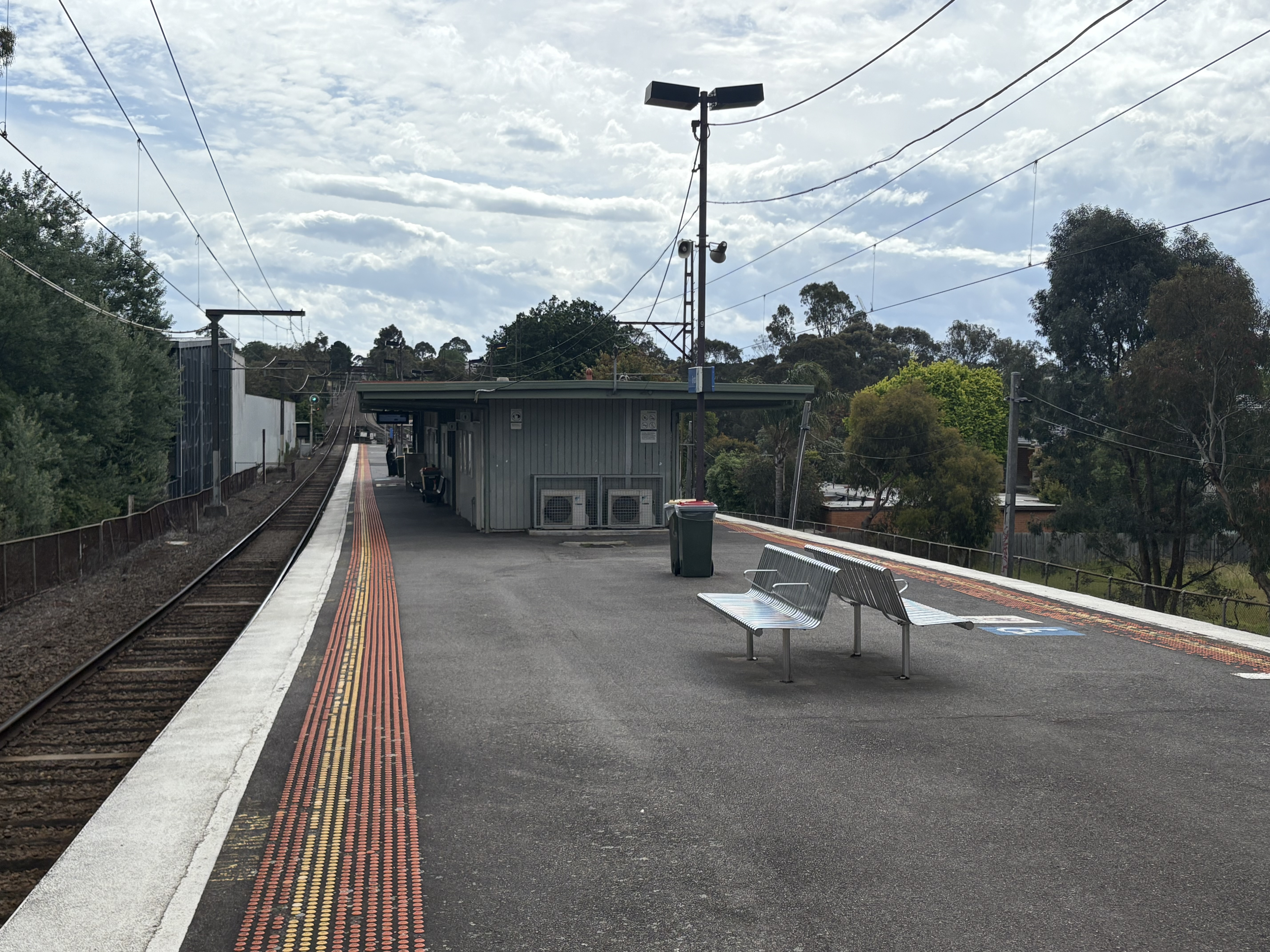
- Westbound view from Platform 1, November 2025

General information
- Location: Coleman Parade, Glen Waverley, Victoria 3150; City of Monash; Australia
- Coordinates: 37°52′35″S 145°08′58″E
- System: PTV commuter rail station
- Owner: VicTrack
- Operator: Metro Trains
- Line: Glen Waverley
- Distance: 20.89 kilometres from Southern Cross
- Platforms: 2 (1 island)
- Tracks: 2
- Connections: Bus

Construction
- Structure type: Ground
- Parking: 590
- Cycle facilities: Yes
- Accessible: No — steep ramp

Other information
- Status: Operational, host station
- Station code: SYN
- Fare zone: Myki zone 2
- Website: Public Transport Victoria

History
- Opened: 5 May 1930; 96 years ago
- Rebuilt: 29 November 1964
- Electrified: May 1930 (1500 V DC overhead)

Passengers
- 2005–2006: 586,847
- 2006–2007: 630,474 ▲7.43%
- 2007–2008: 696,252 ▲10.43%
- 2008–2009: 682,937 ▼1.91%
- 2009–2010: 708,319 ▲3.71%
- 2010–2011: 794,046 ▲12.1%
- 2011–2012: 718,235 ▼9.54%
- 2012–2013: Not measured
- 2013–2014: 688,165 ▼4.18%
- 2014–2015: 629,779 ▼8.48%
- 2015–2016: 686,396 ▲8.99%
- 2016–2017: 840,735 ▲22.48%
- 2017–2018: 878,653 ▲4.51%
- 2018–2019: 898,900 ▲2.3%
- 2019–2020: 708,350 ▼21.19%
- 2020–2021: 261,400 ▼63.09%
- 2021–2022: 333,650 ▲27.64%
- 2022–2023: 660,100 ▲97.84%
- 2023–2024: 682,000 ▲3.32%
- 2024–2025: 698,100 ▲2.36%

Services
Preceding station	Metro Trains	Following station
Mount Waverley towards Flinders Street	Glen Waverley line	Glen Waverley Terminus
Track layout
Location

Syndal station is a railway station operated by Metro Trains Melbourne on the Glen Waverley line, which is part of the Melbourne rail network. It serves the south-eastern suburb of Glen Waverley, in Melbourne, Victoria, Australia.

Syndal station is a ground level unstaffed station, featuring an island platform with two faces, connected to Hunter Street and Coleman Parade via a pedestrian subway. It opened on 5 May 1930, with the current station provided in 1964.

The station is served by SmartBus route 703 and route 737. The station is approximately 21 kilometres (13 mi) or around a 33-minute train ride from Flinders Street.

== Description ==
Syndal station is located in the suburb of Glen Waverley. On the north side of the station is Hunter Street and Coleman Parade is to the south. The station is owned by VicTrack, a state government agency, and is operated by Metro Trains Melbourne.

The length of the island platform is approximately 160 metres (520 ft), long enough for a Metro Trains 7-car HCMT. There is a single station building which primarily serves as a ticket office and waiting area.

The main car park at the station is located on Coleman Parade just south of the station. Although there are ramps, they do not fully comply with the Disability Discrimination Act of 1992, as the gradient of the ramps is steeper than the maximum of 1:14 allowed under the Act.

== History ==
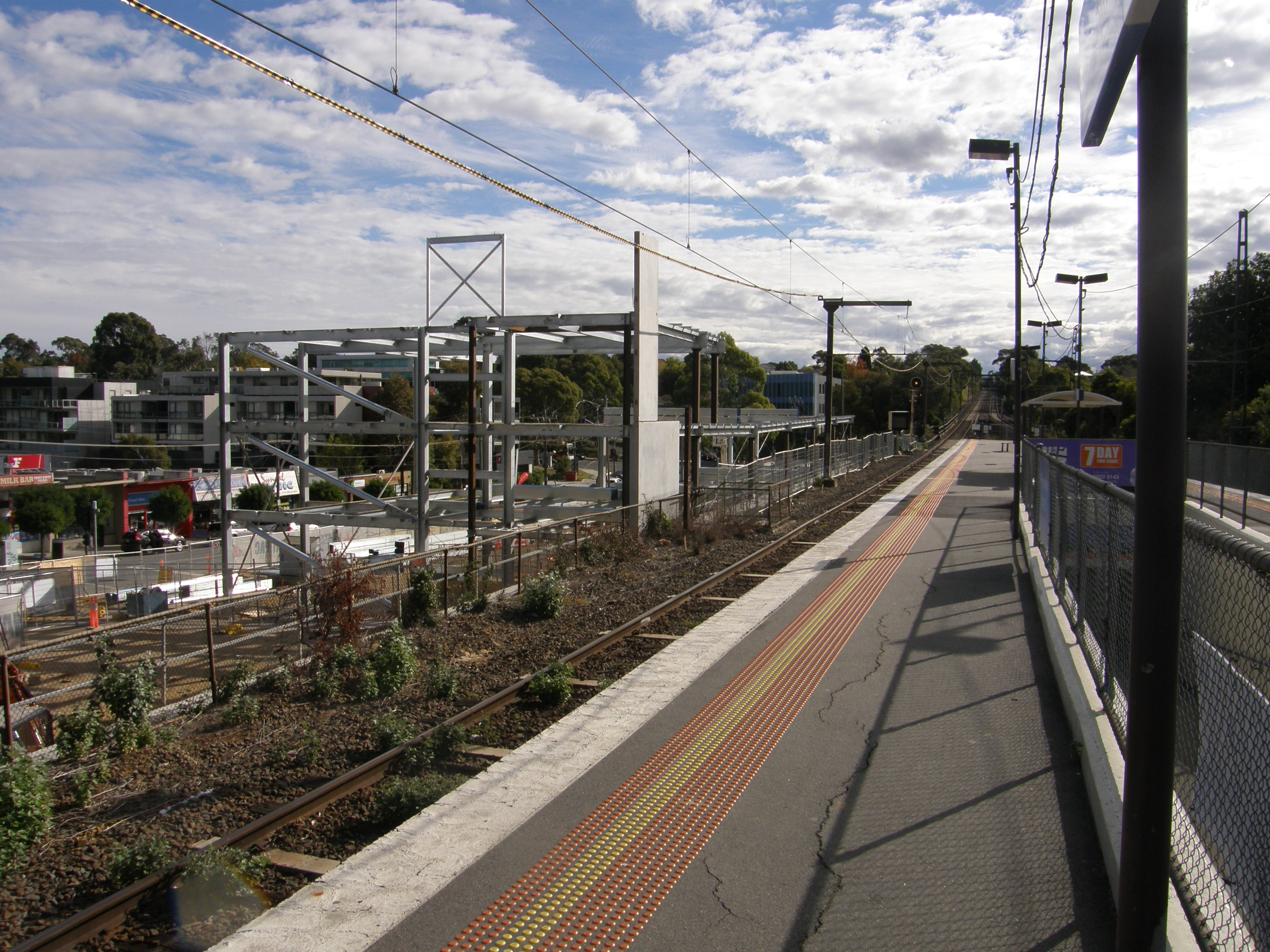
The multi-storey car park being constructed at Syndal Station

Syndal station opened on 5 May 1930, when the railway line from Easmalvern was extended to Glen Waverley. The station gets its name from a nearby property owned by Sir Redmond Barry, a major figure in the development of the area.

In 2015, the station was upgraded to include an additional 250 car parking spaces, with a new multi-deck car park, improved lighting, the installation of CCTV cameras, as well as enhanced pedestrian access. On 26 October of that year, the multi-deck car park officially opened. The four-story car park cost roughly $10.8 million. Although there were plans for a single-deck car park, they were largely opposed by the state government as it was not seen as cost effective.

=== 1989 train collision ===
On 20 November 1989, the station was the site of a collision involving Hitachi and Comeng train sets. The incident occurred after the 07:49 train from Glen Waverley passed a red signal, and collided with the 07:46 train from Glen Waverley, at a speed of roughly 40 km/h. The collision impact resulted in the stationary train being pushed roughly 2–3 metres (6.6–9.8 ft). The 07:46 was stationary at Syndal due to a problem with the doors closing when the collision happened. 75 people were injured in the collision.

== Platforms and services ==
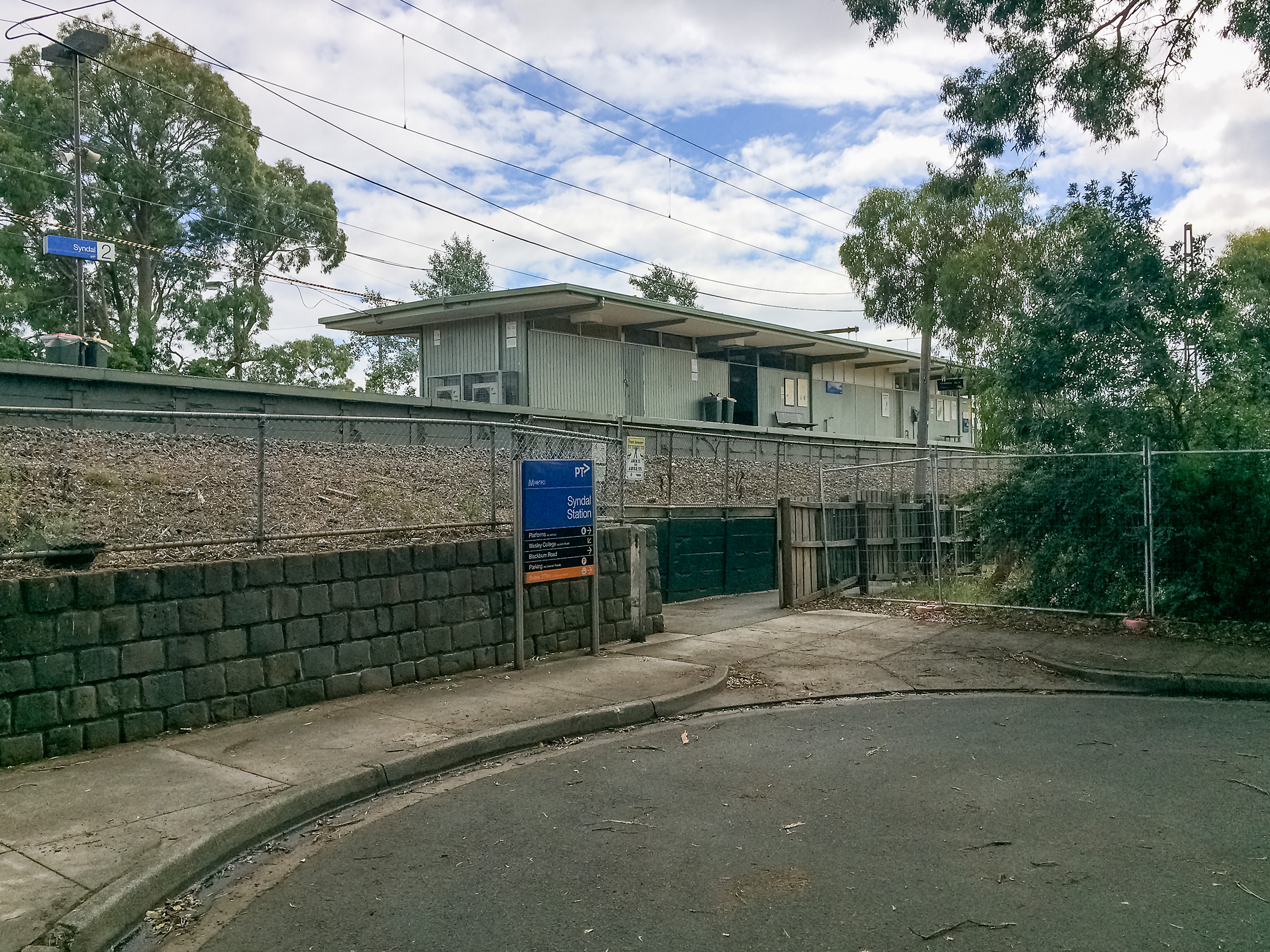
The station's Hunter Street entrance, pedestrian subway and Platform 2, January 2021

The station is currently served by the Glen Waverley line, which is operated by Metro Trains Melbourne. Services to Glen Waverley travel east. Services to the city head to Burnley, joining the Alamein, Belgrave and Lilydale lines, before heading to Richmond and traveling through the City Loop in a clockwise direction.

Syndal platform arrangement
Platform	Line	Destination	Service Type	Source
1	Glen Waverley line	Flinders Street	All stations and limited express services	
2	Glen Waverley line	Glen Waverley	All stations	

== Transport links ==
Syndal is served by SmartBus route 703 and route 737. The station does not have a bus interchange, and instead both routes depart from two separate stops, with route 703 serving the bus stop on Blackburn Road and route 737 serving the bus stop on Coleman Parade.

=== Blackburn Road ===
- SmartBus 703 : Middle Brighton station – Blackburn station

=== Coleman Parade ===
- 737 : Croydon station – Monash University Clayton Campus
