= Holmesglen railway station =

Railway station in Melbourne, Australia

Holmesglen
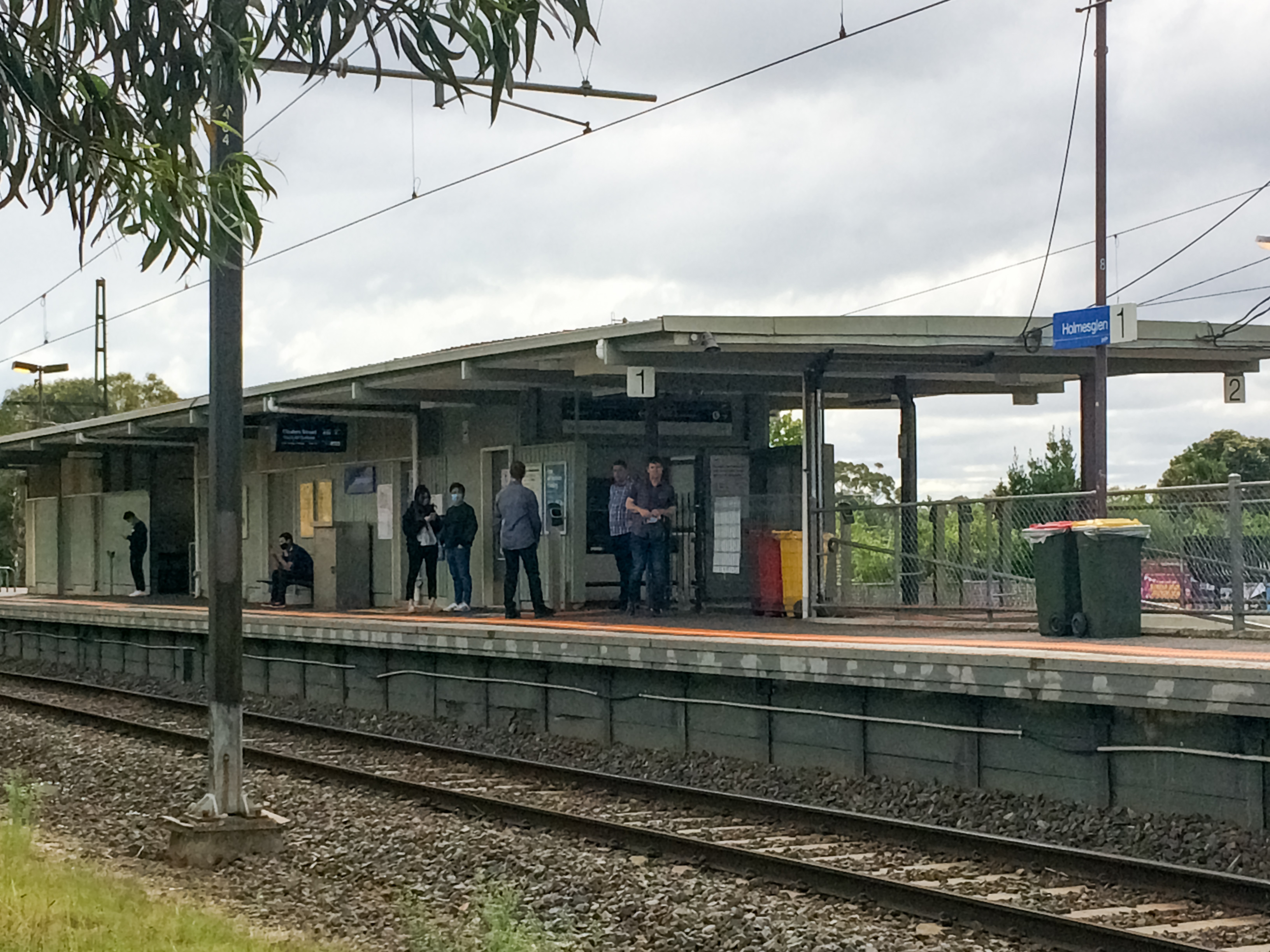
- Westbound view of Platform 1 and station building, January 2021

General information
- Location: Warrigal Road, Malvern East, Victoria 3145; City of Stonnington; Australia
- Coordinates: 37°52′27″S 145°05′29″E
- System: PTV commuter rail station
- Owner: VicTrack
- Operator: Metro Trains
- Line: Glen Waverley
- Distance: 15.65 kilometres from Southern Cross
- Platforms: 2 (1 island)
- Tracks: 2
- Connections: Bus

Construction
- Structure type: Ground
- Parking: 150
- Accessible: No — steep ramp

Other information
- Status: Operational, host station
- Station code: HOL
- Fare zone: Myki zones 1/2
- Website: Public Transport Victoria

History
- Opened: 5 May 1930; 96 years ago
- Rebuilt: 28 June 1964
- Electrified: May 1930 (1500 V DC overhead)

Passengers
- 2005–2006: 670,136
- 2006–2007: 740,285 ▲10.46%
- 2007–2008: 846,455 ▲14.34%
- 2008–2009: 774,036 ▼8.55%
- 2009–2010: 780,354 ▲0.81%
- 2010–2011: 854,741 ▲9.53%
- 2011–2012: 763,758 ▼10.64%
- 2012–2013: Not measured
- 2013–2014: 656,680 ▼14.02%
- 2014–2015: 575,443 ▼12.37%
- 2015–2016: 502,245 ▼12.72%
- 2016–2017: 516,274 ▲2.79%
- 2017–2018: 531,466 ▲2.94%
- 2018–2019: 531,300 ▼0.031%
- 2019–2020: 439,050 ▼17.36%
- 2020–2021: 187,800 ▼57.22%
- 2021–2022: 216,150 ▲15.09%
- 2022–2023: 371,750 ▲71.98%
- 2023–2024: 396,900 ▲6.77%
- 2024–2025: 383,100 ▼3.48%

Services
Preceding station	Metro Trains	Following station
East Malvern towards Flinders Street	Glen Waverley line	Jordanville towards Glen Waverley
Track layout
Location

Holmesglen station is a railway station operated by Metro Trains Melbourne on the Glen Waverley line, which is part of the Melbourne rail network. It serves the eastern suburb of Malvern East, in Melbourne, Victoria, Australia. Holmesglen station is a ground level unstaffed station, featuring an island platform. It opened on 5 May 1930, with the current station provided in 1964.

The station is directly connected via a walkway to the adjacent Chadstone Campus of Holmesglen Institute of TAFE, with which the station shares its name.

== History ==
Holmesglen station opened on 5 May 1930, when the railway line from East Malvern was extended to Glen Waverley. It is named after the father of Malvern Council at the time of its opening, Councillor L. W. Holmes.

In 1964, the current island platform was provided, when the line between East Malvern and Mount Waverley was duplicated. On 17 December 1965, the rail bridge near the station was the crime scene of an infamous Melbourne murder.

During June and early July 1991, the station was patrolled 24 hours a day by the former Victoria Transit Patrol department, working in conjunction with local police, as part of the Public Transport Corporation "Travel Safe" program of the early 1990s.

On 26 July 2000, the station was the site of a collision involving two Comeng train sets.

As part of the 2010/2011 State Budget, $83.7 million was allocated to upgrade Holmesglen to a premium station, along with nineteen others. However, in March 2011, this was scrapped by the Baillieu Government.

== Platforms and services ==
Holmesglen has one island platform with two faces. It is serviced by Metro Trains' Glen Waverley line services.

Holmesglen platform arrangement
Platform	Line	Destination	Service Type	Source
1	Glen Waverley line	Flinders Street	All stations and limited express services	
2	Glen Waverley line	Glen Waverley	All stations and limited express services	

== Transport links ==
CDC Melbourne operates one bus route via Holmesglen station, under contract to Public Transport Victoria:

- 624 : Kew – Oakleigh station

Kinetic Melbourne operates one SmartBus route via Holmesglen station, under contract to Public Transport Victoria:

- SmartBus 903 : Altona station – Mordialloc

== Gallery ==
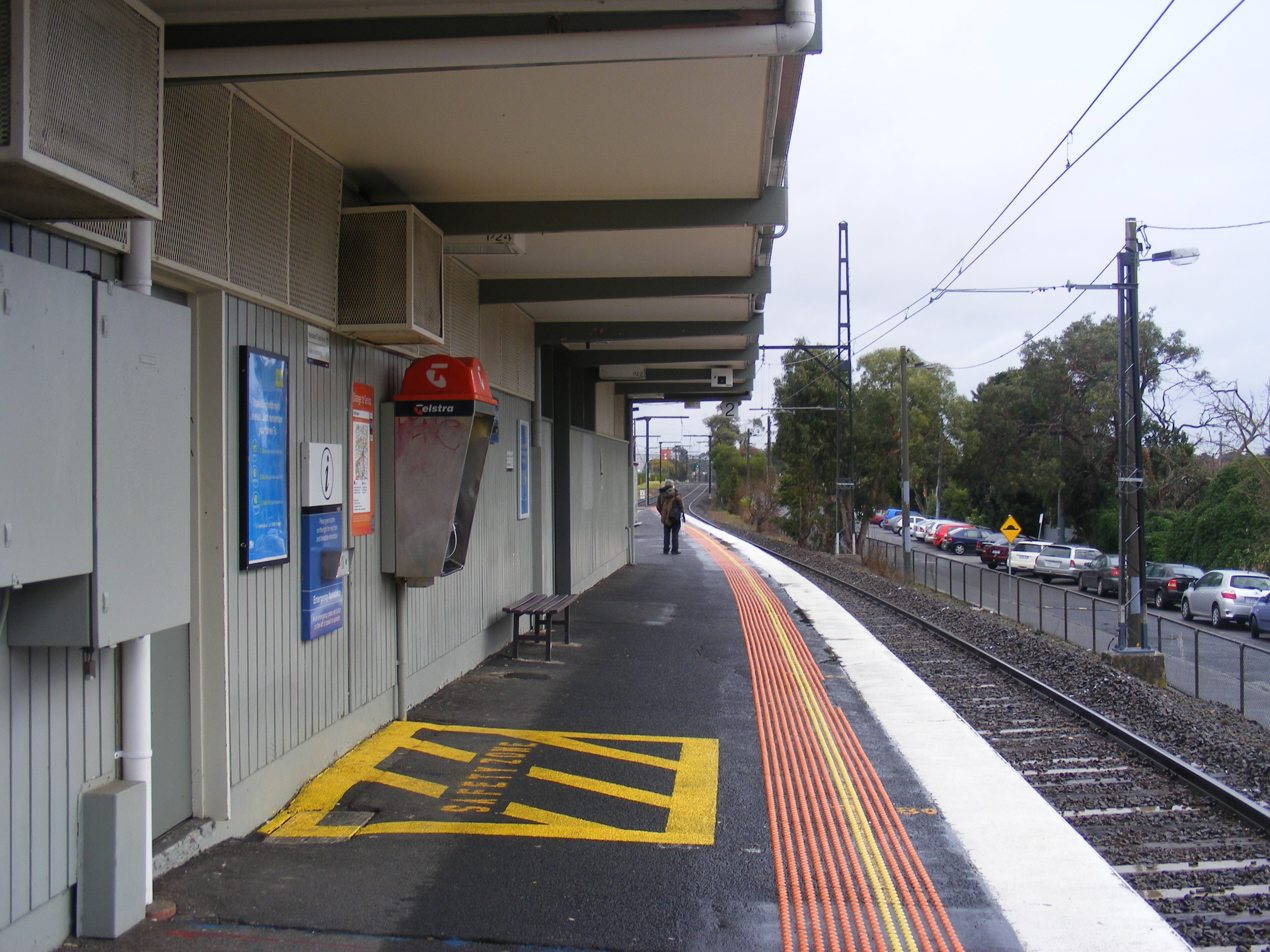
Westbound view from Platform 2, July 2012
