= Glen Waverley line =

Passenger rail service in metropolitan Melbourne, Victoria, Australia

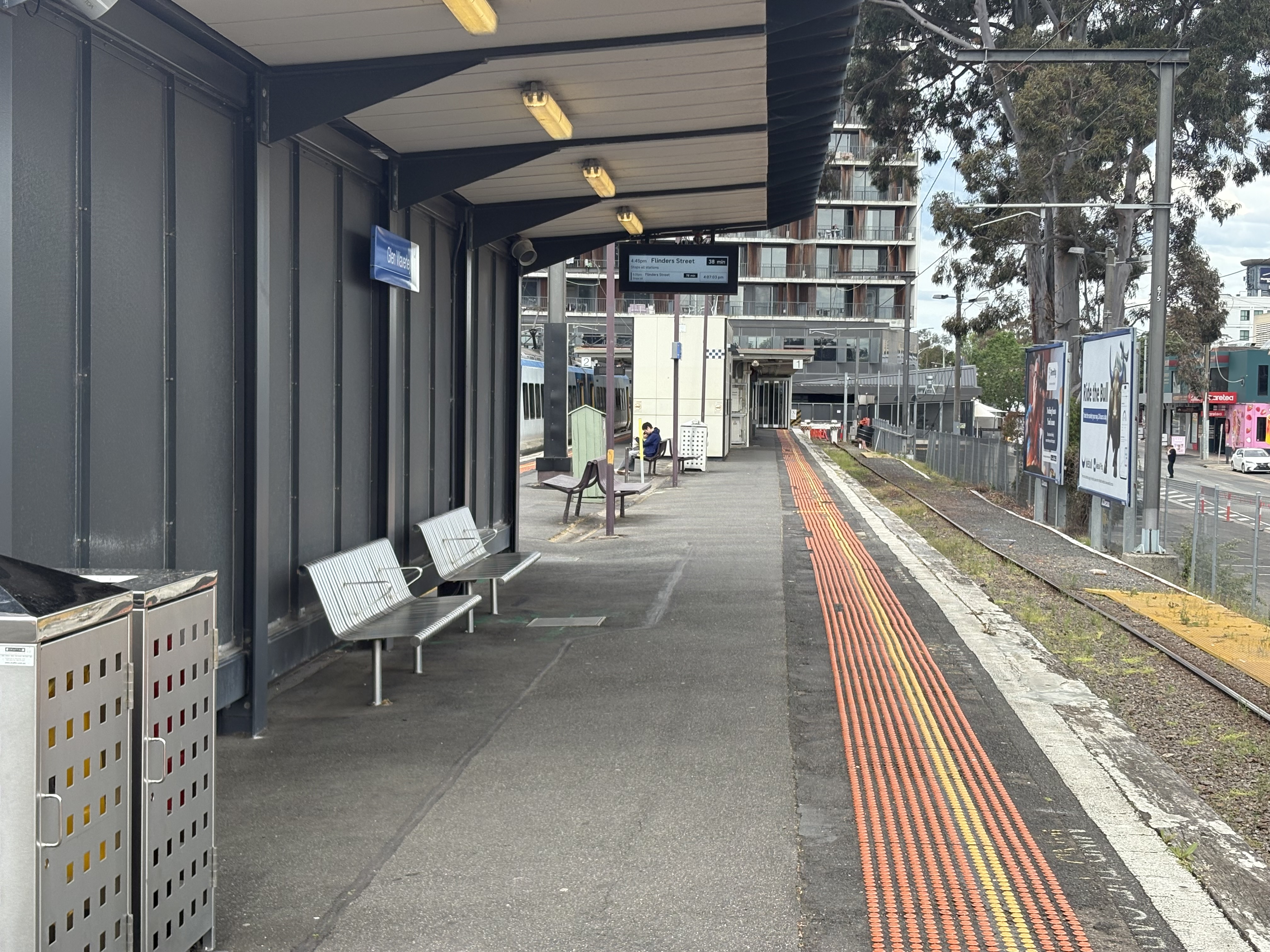
- Glen Waverley station, the line's terminus.

Overview
- Service type: Commuter rail
- System: Melbourne railway network
- Status: Operational
- Locale: Melbourne, Victoria, Australia
- Predecessor: Darling (1890–1922); Darling ^ (1922–1929); East Malvern ^ (1929–1930)^ are electric services
- First service: 24 March 1890; 136 years ago
- Current operator: Metro Trains
- Former operators: Victorian Railways (VR) (1890–1974); VR as VicRail (1974–1983); MTA (The Met) (1983–1989); PTC (The Met) (1989–1998); Hillside Trains (1998–2000); Connex Melbourne (2000–2009)

Route
- Termini: Flinders Street; Glen Waverley
- Stops: 20 (including City Loop stations)
- Distance travelled: 21.3 km (13.2 mi)
- Average journey time: 36 minutes (not via City Loop)
- Service frequency: 7–15 minutes weekdays peak; 10–15 minutes weekdays off-peak; 20 minutes weekend daytime; 30 minutes nights; 60 minutes early weekend mornings; Occasional services run express from Richmond - Darling, and Richmond - Kooyong - Gardiner - Holmesglen - Syndal or Glen Waverley
- Line used: Glen Waverley

Technical
- Rolling stock: X'Trapolis 100
- Track gauge: 1,600 mm (5 ft 3 in)
- Electrification: 1500 V DC overhead
- Track owner: VicTrack

The Glen Waverley line is a commuter railway line in the city of Melbourne, Victoria, Australia. Operated by Metro Trains Melbourne, it is the city's sixth shortest metropolitan railway line at 21.3 kilometres (13.2 mi). The line runs from Flinders Street station in central Melbourne to Glen Waverley station in the east, serving 20 stations including Burnley, Kooyong, East Malvern, and Jordanville. The line operates for approximately 19 hours a day (from approximately 5:15 am to around 12:00 am) with 24 hour service available on Friday and Saturday nights. The line operates with headways of up to 7 minutes during peak hours and as long as 30 minutes during off-peak hours. Trains on the Glen Waverley line run with two three-car formations of X'Trapolis 100 trainsets.

Sections of the Glen Waverley line opened as early as 1890, with the line fully extended to Glen Waverley in 1930. The line was built to connect Melbourne with the rural towns of Kooyong, East Malvern, Mount Waverley, and Glen Waverley, amongst others.

Since the 2010s, due to the heavily utilised infrastructure of the Glen Waverley line, significant improvements and upgrades have been made. Different packages of works have upgraded the corridor to replace sleepers, upgrade signalling technology, introduce new rolling stock, and remove 2 out of the 6 remaining level crossings.

== History ==
=== 19th century ===
A rail connection from Princes Bridge station to Punt Road (Richmond) was built by the Melbourne and Suburban Railway Company in 1859, with a branch line from Richmond to Burnley opening in 1861. In 1890, part of what would become the Glen Waverley line opened from Burnley to Darling. At the same time in 1890, a line known as the Outer Circle line opened, running from Oakleigh station to Darling, continuing to Burnley with the line continuing north to Riversdale and beyond. The Outer Circle closed in sections between 1893 and 1897, with the Burnley to Waverley Road section of the line closing back to Darling in 1895.

=== 20th century ===
Electrification of the line to Glen Waverley occurred in three stages between 1922 and 1930. In March 1922, the section from Burnley to Darling station was electrified, with the section to East Malvern being electrified in June 1929, and the final section to Glen Waverley being completed by May 1930. The electrification of the line allowed for the introduction of Swing Door electric multiple unit trains for the first time.

The introduction of power signalling on the line begun in 1919 with the section from Richmond to East Richmond, with the remainder of the line converted in stages from 1922 to 1964. In 1929, the Glen Waverley line began construction on an extension from Darling to East Malvern along the original track of the Outer Circle line. The Outer Circle line previously begun its curve south towards Waverley Road and Oakleigh. The Glen Waverley line continued east towards Holmesglen.

The 1950s saw the line undergo major upgrades, including the first centralised traffic control installation in Australia. Commissioned in September 1957 at a length of 6 miles (9.7 km) in length, the Victorian Railways installed it as a prototype for the North East standard project. On 6 February 1956, the Toorak Road level crossing between Kooyong and Tooronga stations was the first in Victoria to receive boom barriers, replacing hand operated gates.

New Comeng trains were introduced to the Melbourne railway system in 1981. Initially, along with the Glen Waverley line, they were only allowed to operate on the Alamein, Belgrave, Dandenong and Lilydale lines, due to the width of the trains (10 feet (3.05 m)). Also in 1981, Glen Waverley line services commenced operations through the City Loop, after previously terminating at Flinders or Spencer Street stations. The commencement of operations involved the service stopping at three new stations—Parliament, Melbourne Central (then called Museum), and Flagstaff. The Loop follows La Trobe and Spring Streets along the northern and eastern edges of the Hoddle Grid. The Loop connects with Melbourne's two busiest stations, Flinders Street and Southern Cross, via the elevated Flinders Street Viaduct.

Many stations were rebuilt and level crossings removed along the corridor through the construction of road bridges during the 1970s to the late 1980s. These works coincided with the construction of the Monash Freeway which runs alongside the route for part of the journey.

=== 21st century ===
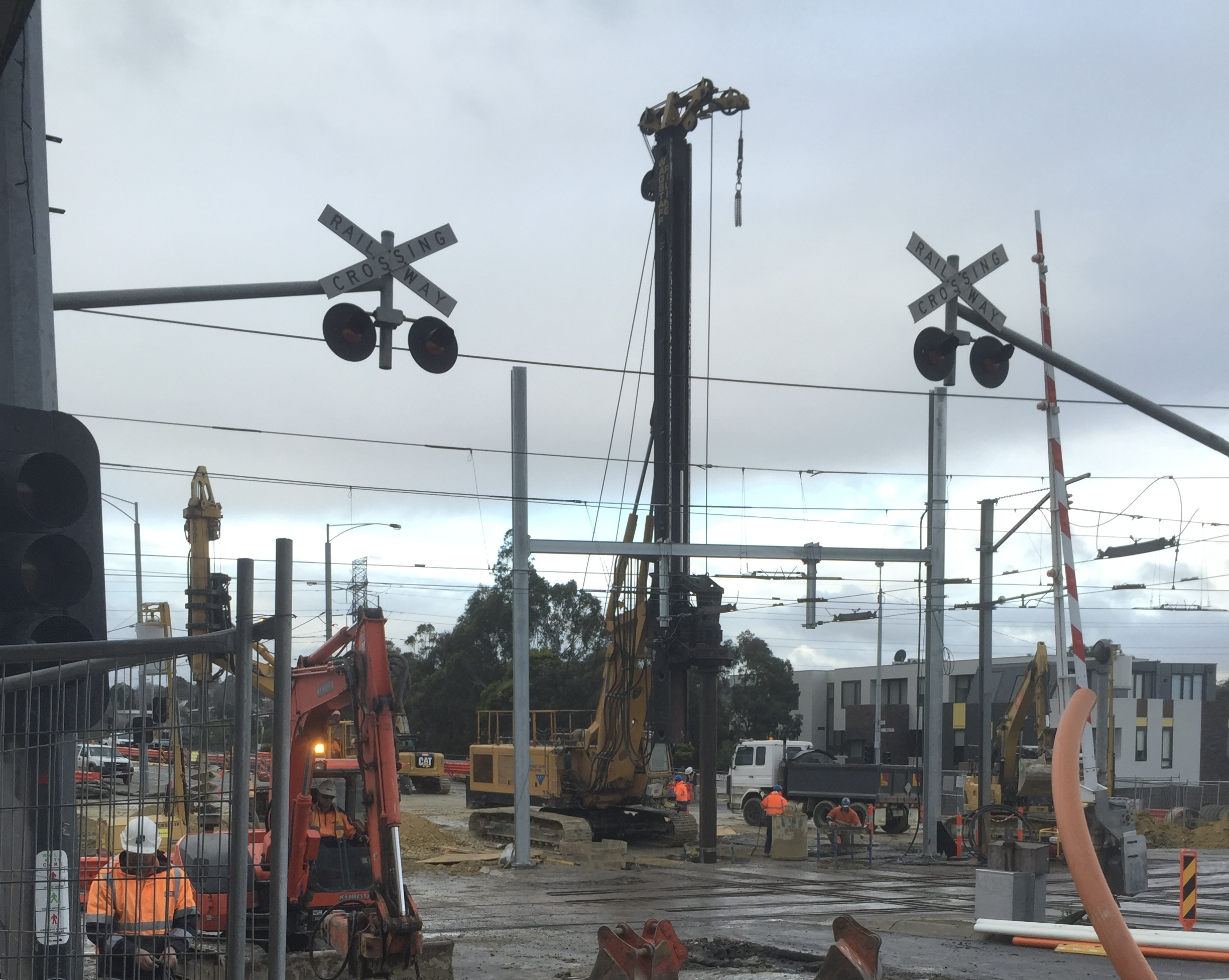
Works to remove the Burke Road level crossing, 2015

In 2014, the Level Crossing Removal Project announced the removal of 2 level crossings on the Glen Waverley line, to be completed in 2016 and 2020. The removal of Burke Road, Glen Iris involved the lowering of the rail line and the reconstruction of Gardiner station. This was the first crossing to be removed by the project and was completed in 2016. The second removal involved raising the rail corridor above Toorak Road, Kooyong, with the crossing removed by early 2020. With the removal of 2 level crossings along the corridor, only 4 crossings now remain on the Glen Waverley line.

In 2021, the metropolitan timetable underwent a major rewrite, resulting in all Glen Waverley line trains operating via the City Loop alongside Alamein, Belgrave, and Lilydale services.

In 2023, data from Public Transport Victoria found that the Glen Waverley line was the most on-time train service on the network. Commuters on the Craigieburn line faced the highest train delays, with 10.6% of services arriving late between March 2022 and February 2023. The Pakenham line experienced the most cancellations in the city's south-east, at 3.1%, excluding lines with fewer services. On the positive side, the Glen Waverley line was the top performer, boasting 97.1% on-time arrivals during the same period.

As part of the Labor Parties campaign prior to the 2026 Victorian state election, premier Ben Carroll pledged $100 million and promised 10 minute service frequency throughout the day on the Glen Waverley Line.

== Network and operations ==
=== Services ===
Services on the Glen Waverley line operates from approximately 5:15 am to around 12:00 am daily. During peak hours, trains run every 7–10 minutes, while service during non-peak hours drops to 15–30 minutes throughout the entire route. On Friday nights and weekends, services run 24 hours a day, with 60 minute frequencies available outside of normal operating hours.

Train services on the line are also subjected to maintenance and renewal works, usually on selected Fridays and Saturdays. Shuttle bus services are provided throughout the duration of works for affected commuters.

==== Stopping patterns ====
Legend – Station status

- ◼ Premium Station – Station staffed from first to last train
- ◻ Host Station – Usually staffed during morning peak, however this can vary for different stations on the network.

Legend – Stopping patterns
Some services do not operate via the City Loop

- ● – All trains stop
- ◐ – Some services do not stop
- ▼ – Only outbound trains stop
- | – Trains pass and do not stop

Glen Waverley Services
Station	Zone	Local	AM Express	PM Express
◼ Flinders Street	1	●	●	●
◼ Southern Cross	1	▼	|	▼
◼ Flagstaff	1	▼	|	▼
◼ Melbourne Central	1	▼	|	▼
◼ Parliament	1	▼	|	▼
◼ Richmond	1	●	●	●
East Richmond	1	◐	|	|
◼ Burnley	1	●	|	|
Heyington	1	●	|	|
Kooyong	1	●	●	|
◻ Tooronga	1	●	|	|
Gardiner	1	●	●	|
Glen Iris	1	●	|	|
◼ Darling	1/2	●	|	●
◼ East Malvern	1/2	●	|	●
◻ Holmesglen	1/2	●	●	●
Jordanville	2	●	|	●
◼ Mount Waverley	2	●	|	●
◻ Syndal	2	●	●	●
◼ Glen Waverley	2	●	◐	●

=== Operators ===
The Glen Waverley line has had a total of 6 operators since its opening in 1888. The majority of operations throughout its history have been government run: from its first service in 1888 until the 1999 privatisation of Melbourne's rail network, four different government operators have run the line. These operators, Victorian Railways, the Metropolitan Transit Authority, the Public Transport Corporation and Hillside Trains have a combined operational length of 111 years. Hillside Trains was privatised in August 1999 and later rebranded Connex Melbourne. Metro Trains Melbourne, the current private operator, then took over the operations in 2009. Both private operators have had a combined operational period of 27 years.

Past and present operators of the Glen Waverley line:
Operator	Assumed operations	Ceased operations	Length of operations
Victorian Railways	1888	1983	95 years
Metropolitan Transit Authority	1983	1989	6 years
Public Transport Corporation	1989	1998	9 years
Hillside Trains (government operator)	1998	1999	1 years
Connex Melbourne	1999	2009	10 years
Metro Trains Melbourne	2009	incumbent	16 years (ongoing)

=== Route ===
Interactive map of the Glen Waverley line in eastern Melbourne.

Glen Waverley (physical track)

Overview
- Status: Operational with passenger services from Flinders Street to Glen Waverley
- Owner: Victorian Railways (VR) (1890–1974); VR as VicRail (1974–1983); MTA (The Met) (1983–1989); PTC (The Met) (1989–1997); VicTrack (1997–Current)
- Locale: Melbourne, Victoria, Australia
- Termini: Flinders Street; Glen Waverley
- Connecting lines: All metropolitan, regional, and interstate
- Former connections: Outer Circle
- Stations: 20 current stations; 3 former stations

Service
- Services: Glen Waverley

History
- Work began: 24 March 1890
- Opened: Princes Bridge to Richmond on 8 February 1859; Richmond to Burnley on 24 September 1860; Flinders Street to Princes Bridge on 18 December 1865; Burnley to Darling on 24 March 1890; Darling to East Malvern on 3 February 1929; East Malvern to Glen Waverley on 5 May 1930
- Completed: 5 May 1930
- Electrified: Flinders Street to Darling on 19 December 1922; To East Malvern on 3 February 1929; To Glen Waverley on 5 May 1930

Technical
- Line length: 21.3 km (13.2 mi)
- Num of tracks: Twelve tracks: Flinders Street to Richmond; Four tracks: Richmond to Burnley; Double track: Burnley to Glen Waverley
- Track gauge: 1,600 mm (5 ft 3 in)
- Electrification: 1500 V DC overhead
- Operating speed: 95 km/h (59 mph) – Electric
- Signalling: Automatic block signalling
- Maximum incline: 1 in 30 (3.33%)

The Glen Waverley line forms a mostly curved route from the Melbourne central business district to its terminus in Glen Waverley. The route is 21.3 kilometres (13.2 mi) long and is predominantly doubled tracked. Between Flinders Street station and Richmond, the track is widened to 12 tracks, narrowing to 4 tracks between Richmond and Burnley before again narrowing to 2 tracks between Burnley and Glen Waverley. After departing from its terminus at Flinders Street, the Glen Waverley line traverses both flat and hilly country with few curves and fairly minimal earthworks for most of the line. The journey from Holmesglen to the terminus involves some of the steepest grades in Melbourne (1 in 30). Sections of the line have been elevated or lowered into a cutting to eliminate level crossings. However, a small number of level crossings are still present with no current plans to remove them.

The line follows the same alignment as the Alamein, Belgrave, and Lilydale lines with the four services splitting onto different routes at Burnley. The Glen Waverley line goes on its south eastern alignment, whereas the Alamein, Belgrave, and Lilydale lines take an eastern alignment towards their final destinations. The rail line goes through built-up suburbs towards its terminus in Glen Waverley.

=== Stations ===
The line serves 20 stations across 21 kilometres (13 mi) of track. The stations are a mix of elevated, lowered, underground, and ground level designs. Underground stations are present only in the City Loop, with the majority of the lowered stations being constructed as part of the level crossing removals.

Station	Accessibility	Opened	Terrain	Train connections	Other connections
Flinders Street	Yes—step free access	1854	Lowered	13 connections: * Alamein line; Belgrave line; Craigieburn line; Flemington Racecourse line; Frankston line; Gippsland line; Hurstbridge line; Lilydale line; Mernda line; Sandringham line; Upfield line; Werribee line; Williamstown line	Trams Buses
Southern Cross	Yes—step free access	1859	Ground level	25 connections: Alamein line; Albury line; Ararat line; Ballarat line; Belgrave line; Bendigo line; Craigieburn line; Echuca line; Flemington Racecourse line; Frankston line; Geelong line; Gippsland line; Hurstbridge line; Lilydale line; Maryborough line; Mernda line; NSW TrainLink Southern; Seymour line; Shepparton line; Swan Hill line; The Overland; Upfield line; Warrnambool line; Werribee line; Williamstown line	Trams Buses Coaches SkyBus
Flagstaff	Yes—step free access	1985	Underground	8 connections: Alamein line; Belgrave line; Craigieburn line; Frankston line; Hurstbridge line; Lilydale line; Mernda line; Upfield line	Trams
Melbourne Central	Yes—step free access	1981	Underground	8 connections: Alamein line; Belgrave line; Craigieburn line; Frankston line; Hurstbridge line; Lilydale line; Mernda line; Upfield line	Trams Buses
Parliament	Yes—step free access	1983	Underground	8 connections: Alamein line; Belgrave line; Craigieburn line; Frankston line; Hurstbridge line; Lilydale line; Mernda line; Upfield line	Trams
Richmond	No—steep ramp	1859	Elevated	6 connections: Alamein line; Belgrave line; Frankston line; Gippsland line; Lilydale line; Sandringham line	Trams Buses
East Richmond	Yes—step free access	1860	Ground level	3 connections: Alamein line; Belgrave line; Lilydale line	Trams
Burnley	No—steep ramp	1880	Ground level	3 connections: Alamein line; Belgrave line; Lilydale line	Trams
Heyington	No—stairs required	1890	Ground level		
Kooyong	Yes—step free access	1890	Ground level		Trams
Tooronga	Yes—step free access	1890	Ground level		Buses
Gardiner	Yes—step free access	1890	Lowered		Trams
Glen Iris	No—steep ramp	1890	Ground level		Trams Buses
Darling	Yes—step free access	1890	Ground level		Buses
East Malvern	No—steep ramp	1929	Ground level		Buses
Holmesglen	No—steep ramp	1930	Ground level		Buses
Jordanville	No—steep ramp	1930	Ground level		Buses
Mount Waverley	No—steep ramp	1930	Ground level		Buses
Syndal	No—steep ramp	1930	Ground level		Buses
Glen Waverley	No—steep ramp	1930	Ground level		Buses

Station histories
Station	Opened	Closed	Age	Notes
Parliament	22 January 1983		43 years	
Melbourne Central	26 January 1981		45 years	Formerly Museum
Flagstaff	27 May 1985		41 years	
Southern Cross	17 January 1859		167 years	Formerly Batman's Hill; Formerly Spencer Street
Flinders Street	12 September 1854		172 years	Formerly Melbourne Terminus
Princes Bridge	8 February 1859	1 October 1866	7 years	
Princes Bridge	2 April 1879	30 June 1980	101 years	
Botanic Gardens	2 March 1859	c. April 1862	Approx. 3 years	
Punt Road	8 February 1859	12 December 1859	10 months	Replaced by Swan Street (200m further along line)
Richmond	12 December 1859		166 years	Formerly Swan Street
East Richmond	24 September 1860		166 years	Formerly Church Street
Burnley	1 May 1880		146 years	Formerly Burnley Street
Richmond Park	-	-	-	Built 24 March 1890 but never opened
Heyington	24 March 1890		136 years	
Kooyong	24 March 1890		136 years	
Tooronga	24 March 1890		136 years	
Gardiner	24 March 1890		136 years	
Glen Iris	24 March 1890		136 years	
Darling	24 March 1890		136 years	
East Malvern	3 February 1929		97 years	Formerly Eastmalvern
Holmesglen	5 May 1930		96 years	
Jordanville	5 May 1930		96 years	
Mount Waverley	5 May 1930		96 years	
Syndal	5 May 1930		96 years	
Glen Waverley	5 May 1930		96 years	

== Infrastructure ==
=== Rolling stock ===
The Glen Waverley line uses X'Trapolis 100 electric multiple unit (EMU) trains operating in a two three-car configuration, with three doors per side on each carriage, and can accommodate up to 432 seated passengers in each six-car configuration. The trains were originally built between 2002 and 2004 as well as between 2009 and 2020 with a total of 212 three-car sets constructed. The trains are shared with 7 other metropolitan train lines and have been in service since 2003. Comeng trains are approved for revenue service on the line, but they don't run due to the abundance of X'trapolis trains.

Alongside the passenger trains, Glen Waverley line tracks and equipment are maintained by a fleet of engineering trains. The four types of engineering trains are: the shunting train; designed for moving trains along non-electrified corridors and for transporting other maintenance locomotives, for track evaluation; designed for evaluating track and its condition, the overhead inspection train; designed for overhead wiring inspection, and the infrastructure evaluation carriage designed for general infrastructure evaluation. Most of these trains are repurposed locomotives previously used by V/Line, Metro Trains, and the Southern Shorthaul Railroad.

=== Accessibility ===
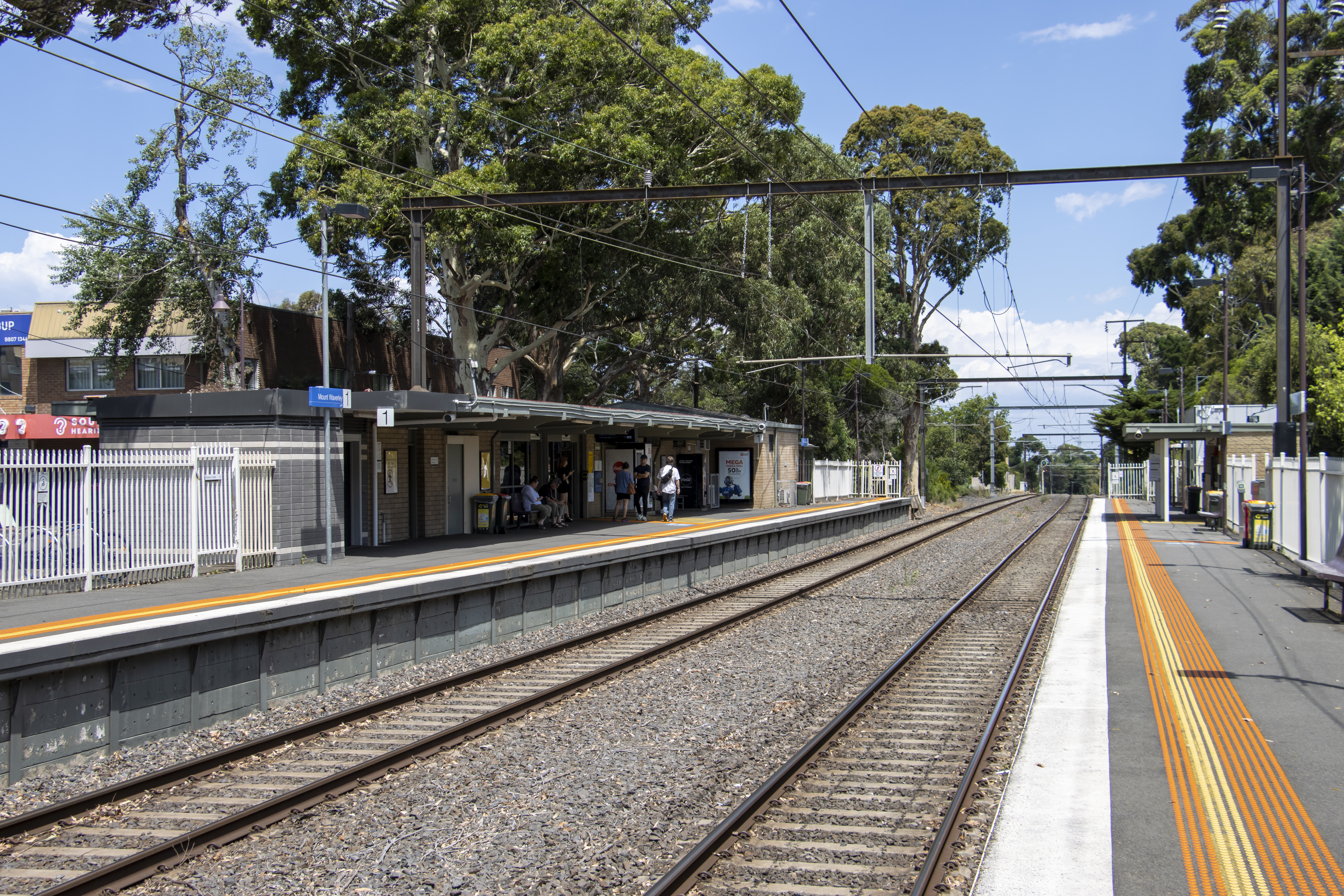
Mount Waverley station features tactile boarding indicators and other accessible features.

In compliance with the Disability Discrimination Act of 1992, all stations that are newly built or rebuilt are fully accessible. Half of stations on the corridor haven't been upgraded to meet these guidelines. These stations do feature ramps, however, they have a gradient greater than 1 in 14. Stations that are fully accessible feature ramps that have a gradient less than 1 in 14, have at-grade paths, or feature lifts. These stations typically also feature tactile boarding indicators, independent boarding ramps, wheelchair accessible myki barriers, hearing loops, and widened paths.

In April 2026, the final two stations without tactile boarding indicators were installed with Glen Iris and East Malvern Platform 1 being the last being installed with them.

Projects improving station accessibility have included the Level Crossing Removal Project, which involves station rebuilds and upgrades, and individual station upgrade projects. These works have made significant strides in improving network accessibility, with half of Glen Waverley line stations classed as fully accessible. Potential future station upgrade projects will continue to increase the number of fully accessible stations over time.

=== Signalling ===
The Glen Waverley line uses three position signalling which is widely used across the Melbourne train network. Three position signalling was first introduced on the line in 1919, with the final section of the line converted to the new type of signalling in 1964.
