= Jordanville railway station =

Railway station in Melbourne, Australia

Jordanville
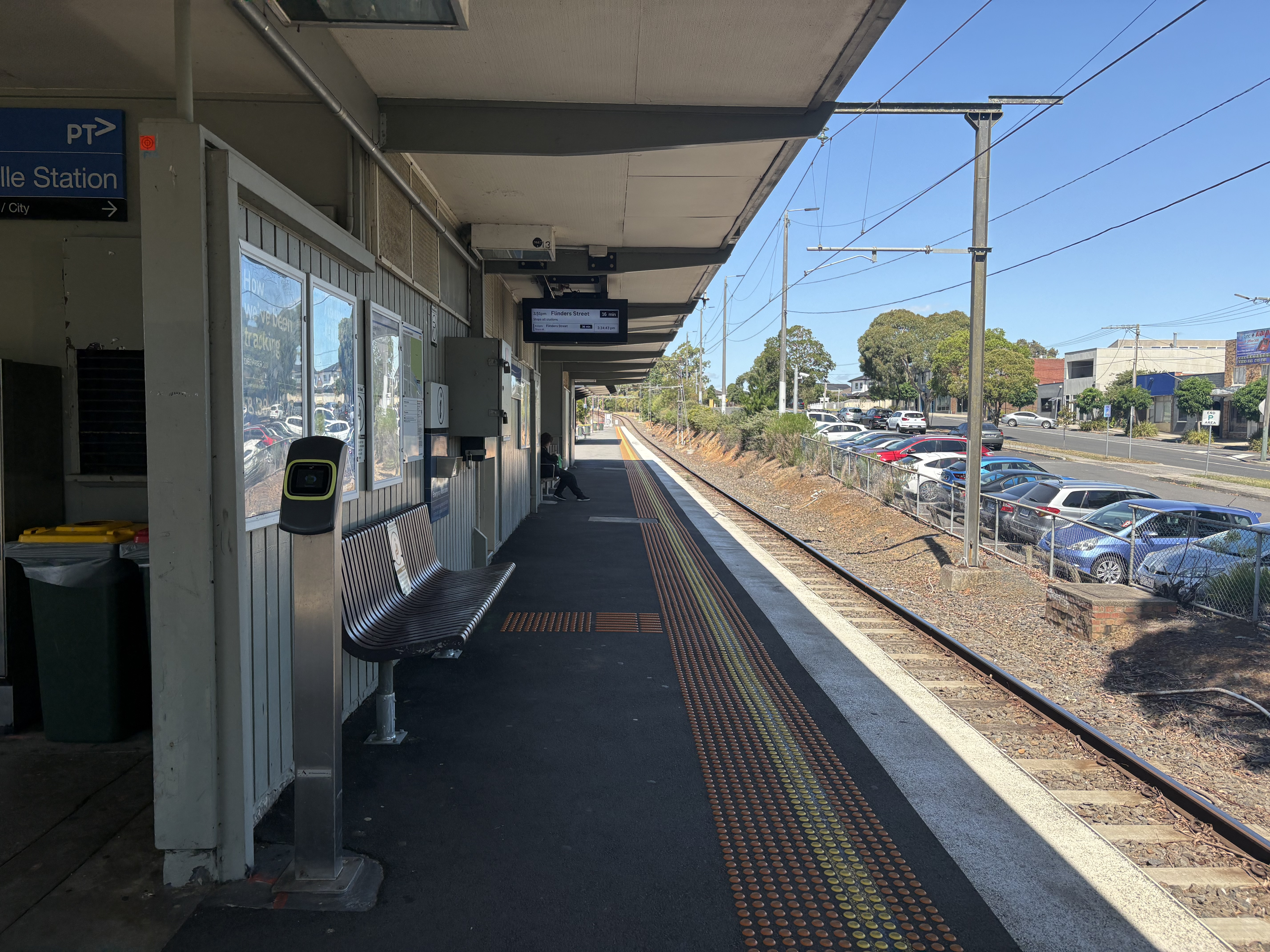
- Eastbound view from Platform 1, February 2025

General information
- Location: Windsor Avenue, Mount Waverley, Victoria 3149; City of Monash; Australia
- Coordinates: 37°52′25″S 145°06′43″E
- System: PTV commuter rail station
- Owner: VicTrack
- Operator: Metro Trains
- Line: Glen Waverley
- Distance: 17.61 kilometres from Southern Cross
- Platforms: 2 (1 island)
- Tracks: 2
- Connections: Bus

Construction
- Structure type: Ground
- Parking: 155
- Cycle facilities: 26
- Accessible: No — steep ramp

Other information
- Status: Operational, unstaffed
- Station code: JOR
- Fare zone: Myki zone 2
- Website: Public Transport Victoria

History
- Opened: 5 May 1930; 96 years ago
- Rebuilt: 28 June 1964
- Electrified: May 1930 (1500 V DC overhead)
- Former names: Kabbareng (1930)

Passengers
- 2005–2006: 253,803
- 2006–2007: 289,887 ▲14.21%
- 2007–2008: 332,830 ▲14.81%
- 2008–2009: 346,438 ▲4.08%
- 2009–2010: 349,233 ▲0.8%
- 2010–2011: 351,973 ▲0.78%
- 2011–2012: 319,606 ▼9.19%
- 2012–2013: Not measured
- 2013–2014: 324,587 ▲1.55%
- 2014–2015: 354,129 ▲9.1%
- 2015–2016: 416,639 ▲17.65%
- 2016–2017: 458,326 ▲10%
- 2017–2018: 486,955 ▲6.24%
- 2018–2019: 498,850 ▲2.44%
- 2019–2020: 402,000 ▼19.41%
- 2020–2021: 157,850 ▼60.73%
- 2021–2022: 191,000 ▲21%
- 2022–2023: 362,950 ▲90.02%
- 2023–2024: 386,400 ▲6.46%
- 2024–2025: 388,950 ▲0.66%

Services
Preceding station	Metro Trains	Following station
Holmesglen towards Flinders Street	Glen Waverley line	Mount Waverley towards Glen Waverley
Track layout
Location

Jordanville station is a railway station operated by Metro Trains Melbourne on the Glen Waverley line, which is part of the Melbourne rail network. It serves the south-eastern suburb of Mount Waverley, in Melbourne, Victoria, Australia. Jordanville station is a ground level unstaffed station, featuring an island platform, connected by a pedestrian subway to Windsor Avenue and Huntingdale Road. It opened on 5 May 1930, with the current station provided in 1964.

The station was provisionally named as Kabbareng. However, during construction, it was renamed to Jordanville.

Additionally, it is served by bus route 767. The station is approximately 17 kilometres (11 mi) or around a 28-minute train ride away from Flinders Street.

== Description ==
Jordanville railway station is located in the suburb of Mount Waverley. On the south side of the station is Winsor Avenue and Huntingdale Road is to the west. The station is owned by VicTrack, a state government agency, and is operated by Metro Trains Melbourne. The station is approximately 17 kilometres (11 mi) or around a 28-minute train ride away from Flinders Street.

Jordanville station consists of an island platform which is connected to Winsor Avenue and Huntingdale Road via a pedestrian subway. The length of the platform is approximately 160 metres (520 ft), long enough for a Metro Trains 7-car HCMT. There is a single station building, which primarily functions as a waiting room.

The main car park at the station is located on Winsor Avenue just south of the station. In addition to the car park, there is a bicycle shed with storage for 26 bikes. Although there are ramps, they do not fully comply with the Disability Discrimination Act of 1992 as the gradient of the ramps is steeper than the maximum of 1:14 allowed under the Act.

== History ==
Jordanville station opened on 5 May 1930, when the railway line from East Malvern was extended to Glen Waverley. The station was named after the Jordan family, mainly John Jordan, who was an early settler and shire councillor. The station was initially to be named "Summer Hill", which was abandoned due to the existing station name in Sydney and its similarity with Somerville and Somerton. Victorian Railways then came up with Kabbareng, an Indigenous word meaning "upper". The name was controversial, as evidenced by a letter sent to the editor of The Argus, on 4 March 1930, using the pseudonym "Anti-Kabbareng". An article in The Age, on 21 March 1930, stated that: "At the last meeting of the Mulgrave Council indignation was expressed at the name of Kabbareng being selected for the railway station at Box Hill-road on the new Darling-Glen Waverley line. The council's recommendation was Jordan. It was decided to ask the district Parliamentary representatives to take up the matter in support of the name selected by the council."

In the 1950s, the level crossing was removed at Jordanville by moving the railway above Huntingdale road.

In 2014, Metro Trains Melbourne was forced to upgrade the track near Jordanville due to the poor maintenance of tracks.

== Platforms and services ==
The station is currently served by the Glen Waverley line, which is operated by Metro Trains Melbourne. Services to Glen Waverley travel east. Services to the city head towards Burnley, joining the Belgrave, Lilydale, and Alamein lines before heading to Richmond and traveling through the City Loop in a clockwise direction.

Jordanville platform arrangement
Platform	Line	Destination	Service Type	Source
1	Glen Waverley line	Flinders Street	All stations and limited express services	
2	Glen Waverley line	Glen Waverley	All stations	

== Transport links ==
Jordanville is served by bus route 767 which departs the station from the bus stop on Huntingdale Road.

- 767 : Westfield Southland – Box Hill station
