= Kooyong railway station =

Railway station in Melbourne, Australia

Kooyong
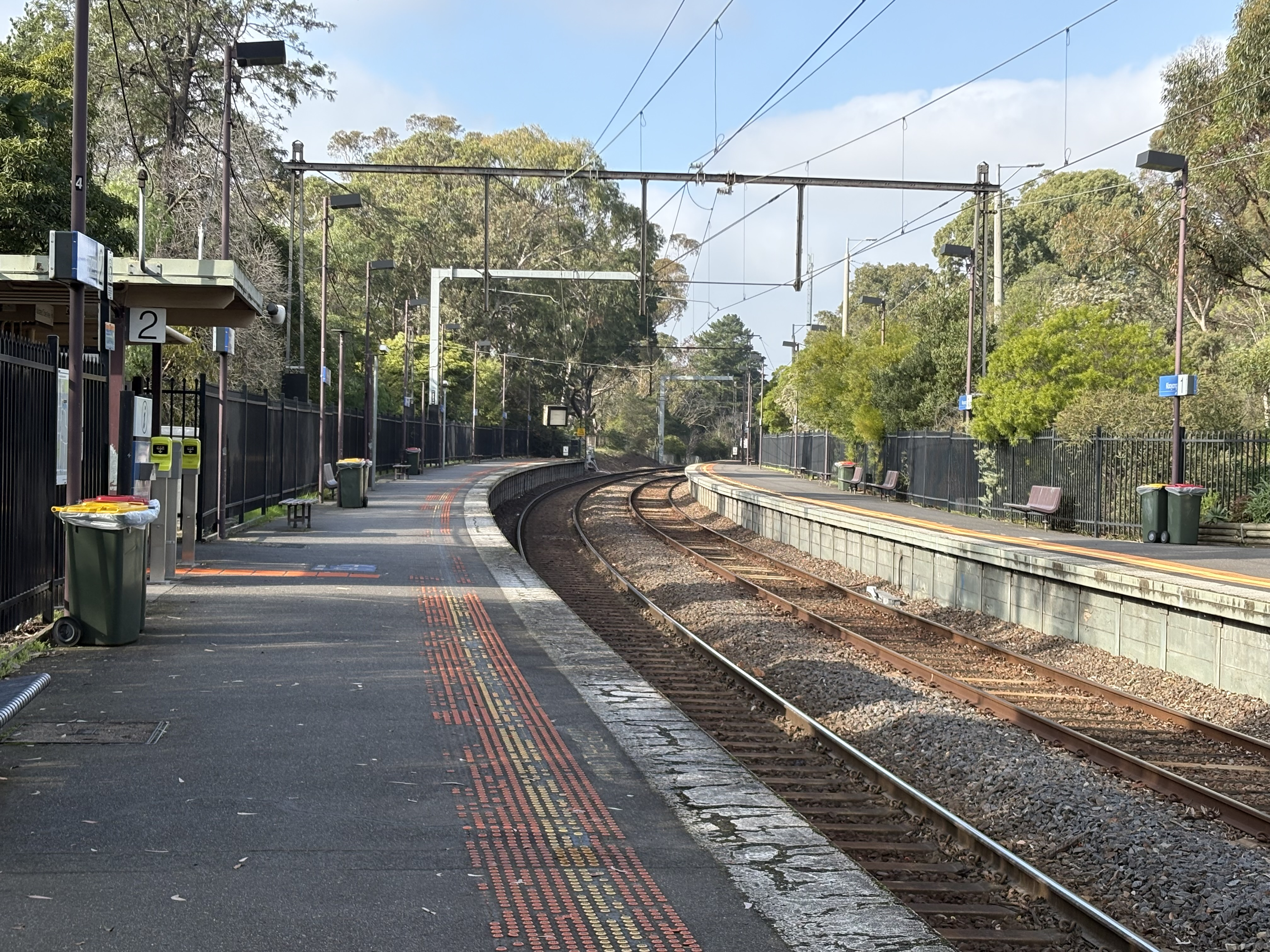
- Eastbound view from Platform 2, June 2026

General information
- Location: Glenferrie Road, Kooyong, Victoria 3144; City of Stonnington; Australia
- Coordinates: 37°50′24″S 145°02′00″E
- System: PTV commuter rail station
- Owner: VicTrack
- Operator: Metro Trains
- Line: Glen Waverley
- Distance: 8.29 kilometres from Southern Cross
- Platforms: 2 side
- Tracks: 2
- Connections: Tram

Construction
- Structure type: Ground
- Parking: 75
- Accessible: Yes—step free access

Other information
- Status: Operational, unstaffed
- Station code: KYG
- Fare zone: Myki zone 1
- Website: Public Transport Victoria

History
- Opened: 24 March 1890; 136 years ago
- Rebuilt: 20 November 1955
- Electrified: December 1922 (1500 V DC overhead)

Passengers
- 2005–2006: 349,249
- 2006–2007: 390,025 ▲11.67%
- 2007–2008: 349,911 ▼10.28%
- 2008–2009: 335,354 ▼4.16%
- 2009–2010: 328,101 ▼2.16%
- 2010–2011: 346,273 ▲5.54%
- 2011–2012: 301,813 ▼12.84%
- 2012–2013: Not measured
- 2013–2014: 317,491 ▲5.19%
- 2014–2015: 305,940 ▼3.63%
- 2015–2016: 295,291 ▼6.99%
- 2016–2017: 339,806 ▲15.07%
- 2017–2018: 339,726 ▼0.023%
- 2018–2019: 344,750 ▲1.48%
- 2019–2020: 263,150 ▼23.67%
- 2020–2021: 102,400 ▼61.1%
- 2021–2022: 132,800 ▲29.68%
- 2022–2023: 238,100 ▲79.29%
- 2023–2024: 257,850 ▲8.29%
- 2024–2025: 233,000 ▼9.64%

Services
Preceding station	Metro Trains	Following station
Heyington towards Flinders Street	Glen Waverley line	Tooronga towards Glen Waverley
Track layout
Location

Kooyong station is a railway station operated by Metro Trains Melbourne on the Glen Waverley line, which is part of the Melbourne rail network. It serves the eastern suburb of Kooyong, in Melbourne, Victoria, Australia. Kooyong station is a ground level unstaffed station, featuring two side platforms. It opened on 24 March 1890, with the current station provided in 1955.

== History ==
Kooyong station opened on 24 March 1890, when the railway line from Burnley was extended to Eastmalvern. The station was originally named North Malvern, but was renamed soon after opening, amid fears regarding the name's similarity to North Melbourne. Like the suburb itself, the station was named after an Indigenous word meaning either 'camp', 'resting place' or 'haunt of the wild fowl'.

In 1955, the line between Kooyong and Gardiner was duplicated, with duplication to Heyington occurring in 1957.

A signal box is located at the up end of Platform 2, to control the Glenferrie Road tramway crossing. In 1985, boom barriers replaced interlocked gates at this crossing.

== Platforms and services ==
Kooyong has two side platforms. It is serviced by Metro Trains' Glen Waverley line services.

Kooyong platform arrangement
Platform	Line	Destination	Service Type	Source
1	Glen Waverley line	Flinders Street	All stations and limited express services	
2	Glen Waverley line	Glen Waverley	All stations	

== Transport links ==
Yarra Trams operates one route via Kooyong station:

- : Melbourne University – Kew

== Gallery ==
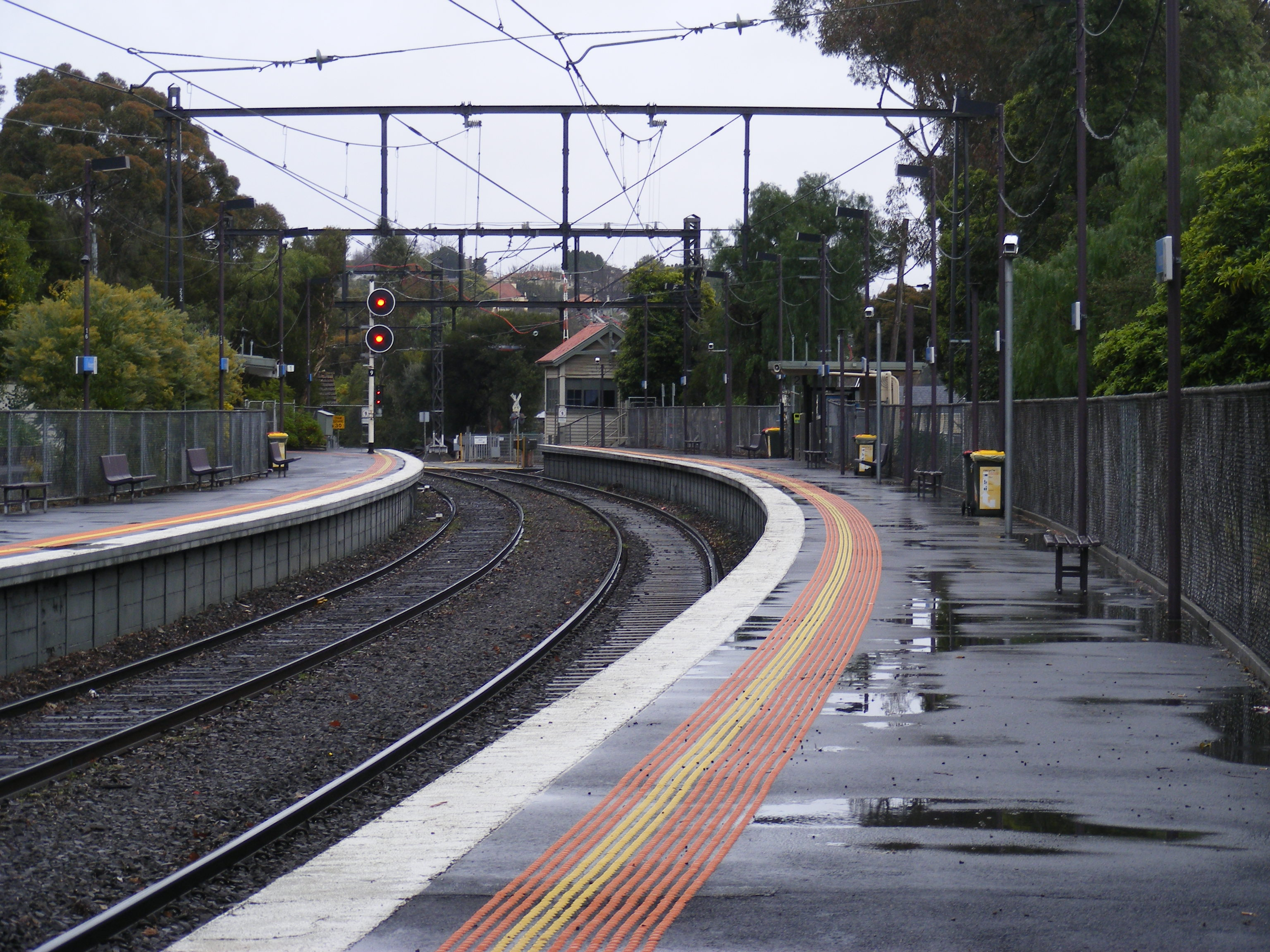
Wesbound view from Platform 2, August 2012
