= Mount Waverley railway station =

Railway station in Melbourne, Australia

Mount Waverley
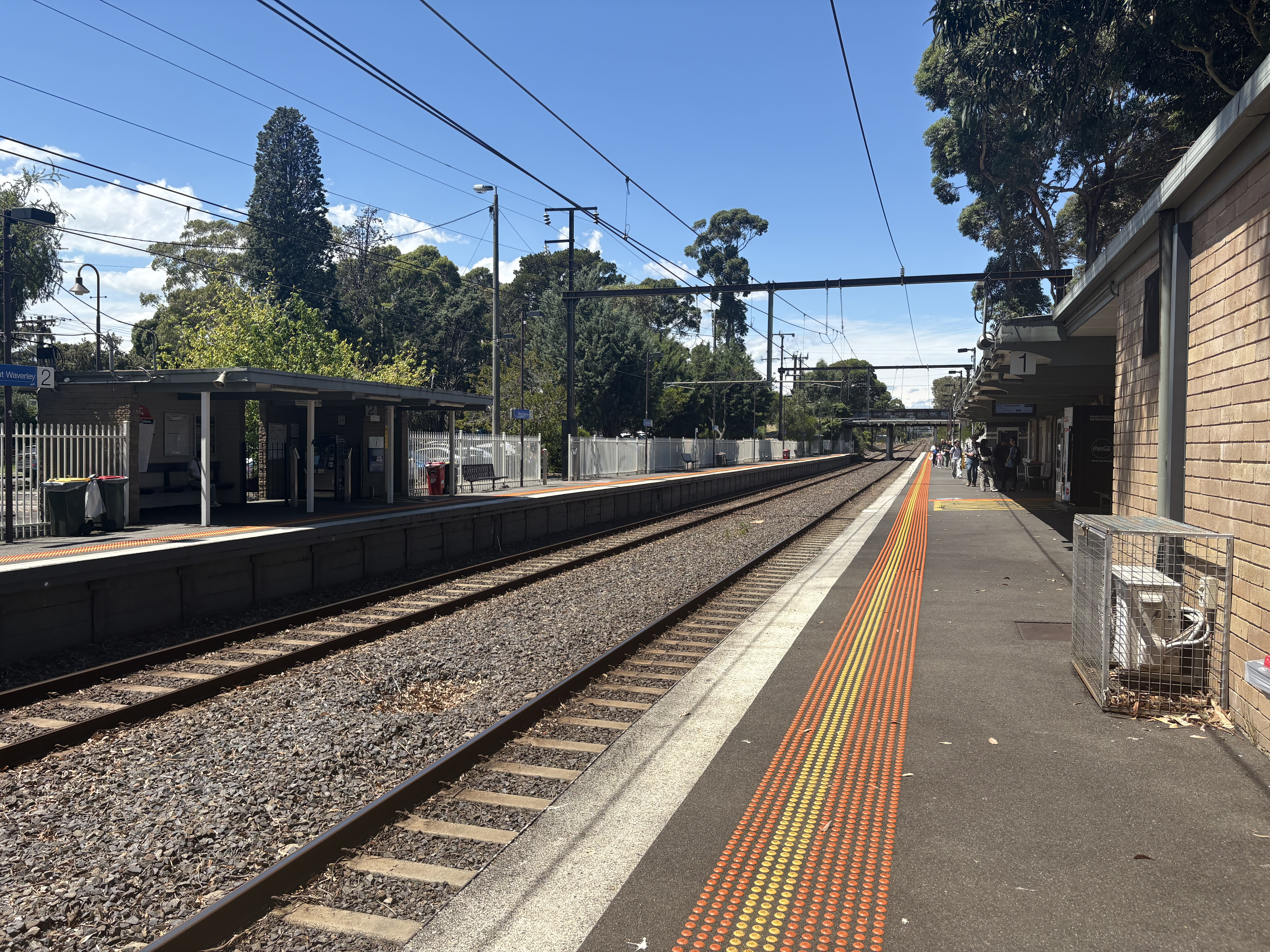
- Eastbound view from Platform 1, February 2025

General information
- Location: Miller Crescent, Mount Waverley, Victoria 3149; City of Monash; Australia
- Coordinates: 37°52′31″S 145°07′42″E
- System: PTV commuter rail station
- Owner: VicTrack
- Operator: Metro Trains
- Line: Glen Waverley
- Distance: 19.00 kilometres from Southern Cross
- Platforms: 2 side
- Tracks: 2
- Connections: Bus

Construction
- Structure type: Ground
- Parking: 200
- Cycle facilities: 12
- Accessible: No — steep ramp

Other information
- Status: Operational, premium station
- Station code: MWY
- Fare zone: Myki zone 2
- Website: Public Transport Victoria

History
- Opened: 5 May 1930; 96 years ago
- Rebuilt: 14 November 1955; 1975
- Electrified: May 1930 (1500 V DC overhead)

Passengers
- 2005–2006: 723,784
- 2006–2007: 779,146 ▲7.64%
- 2007–2008: 1,084,908 ▲39.24%
- 2008–2009: 1,155,456 ▲6.5%
- 2009–2010: 1,164,957 ▲0.82%
- 2010–2011: 953,739 ▼18.13%
- 2011–2012: 893,122 ▼6.35%
- 2012–2013: Not measured
- 2013–2014: 685,766 ▼23.21%
- 2014–2015: 685,889 ▲0.01%
- 2015–2016: 722,833 ▲5.38%
- 2016–2017: 776,950 ▲7.48%
- 2017–2018: 795,241 ▲2.35%
- 2018–2019: 820,100 ▲3.12%
- 2019–2020: 662,850 ▼19.17%
- 2020–2021: 280,350 ▼57.7%
- 2021–2022: 338,200 ▲20.63%
- 2022–2023: 606,350 ▲79.28%
- 2023–2024: 652,600 ▲7.63%
- 2024–2025: 658,250 ▲0.87%

Services
Preceding station	Metro Trains	Following station
Jordanville towards Flinders Street	Glen Waverley line	Syndal towards Glen Waverley
Track layout
Location

Mount Waverley station is a railway station operated by Metro Trains Melbourne on the Glen Waverley line, which is part of Melbourne's rail network. It serves the suburb of Mount Waverley in the south east of Melbourne, Victoria, Australia. The station opened in 1930, as a part of the extension from East Malvern to Glen Waverley.

The station consists of two side platforms which are connected to each other via adjacent roads and a pedestrian subway. Additionally, the station is served by bus routes 623 and 733. The station is approximately 18 kilometres (11 mi) or around a 30-minute train ride away from Flinders Street.

== Description ==
Mount Waverley station is located in the suburb of Mount Waverley. On the north side of the station is Millers Crescent and Hamilton Place is to the south. The station is owned by VicTrack, a state government agency, and is operated by Metro Trains Melbourne.

The length of both platforms is approximately 160 metres (520 ft), long enough for a Metro Trains 7-car HCMT. Both platforms have a single station building, with the building on Platform 1 serving as a waiting room and ticket office.

The main car park at the station is located on Alexander Street, just south-west of the station. Although there are ramps, they do not fully comply with the Disability Discrimination Act of 1992, as the gradient of the ramps is steeper than the maximum of 1:14 allowed under the Act.

== History ==
Mount Waverley station opened on 5 May 1930, when the railway line was extended from East Malven to Glen Waverley. Like the suburb itself, the station was named after Sir Walter Scott's novel Waverley. The suburb was given the name "Mount Waverley" in 1905 to distinguish it from the neighbouring suburb of Glen Waverley.

In the late 1950s, a second platform was built at the station as part of the duplication works on the Glen Waverley line. In 1972, an emergency crossover was abolished.

In 1975, the current station buildings were provided.

On 18 January 1995, Mount Waverley was the first station on the metropolitan railway system to be upgraded to a premium station.

== Platforms and services ==
The station is currently served by the Glen Waverley line, which is operated by Metro Trains Melbourne. Services to Glen Waverley travel east. Services to the city head to Burnley, joining the Alamein, Belgrave and Lilydale lines, before heading to Richmond and traveling through the City Loop in a clockwise direction.

Mount Waverley platform arrangement
Platform	Line	Destination	Service Type	Source
1	Glen Waverley line	Flinders Street	All stations and limited express services	
2	Glen Waverley line	Glen Waverley	All stations	

== Transport links ==
Mount Waverley is served by bus routes 623 and 733. Mount Waverley does not have a bus interchange, and instead both routes depart from two separate stops. Route 623 serves the bus stop on Miller Crescent, with route 733 serving the "Mount Waverley Shopping Centre" bus stop on Stephensons Road.

=== Miller Crescent ===
- 623 : Glen Waverley station – St Kilda

=== Stephensons Road ===
- 733 : to Box Hill station – Oakleigh station
