= Waverley Road railway station =

Former railway station in Victoria, Australia

Coordinates: 37°52′52″S 145°4′19″E

Waverley Road

General information
- Line: Outer Circle
- Platforms: 2

History
- Opened: 3 March 1890
- Closed: 9 December 1895

Services
Preceding station	Disused railways	Following station
Ashburton towards Fairfield	Outer Circle line	Oakleigh towards Oakleigh
Darling	Branch line to Burnley	Junction
	List of closed railway stations in Melbourne	
Location

Waverley Road was a station on the Outer Circle railway line, opened on 3 March 1890 as "Waverley" on the section between Burnley and Oakleigh stations, and was renamed on 23 June 1890. It became a junction on 30 May 1890 when the line from Camberwell opened, and was a Staff and Ticket station, being provided with a signal box of 28 levers. Two platforms were provided, with the junction of the two lines at the North (Camberwell) end, as was a goods siding located near the current East Malvern station in Malvern East, Victoria, Australia, in what is now the Malvern Urban Forest. The platform, the mound of which can still be seen, was located approximately 120 metres SSE of where the line crossed Waverley Road.

The signal box was replaced with a signal frame on the platform in 1891 to save staffing costs. The station was closed on 9 December 1895, along with the lines from Oakleigh to Ashburton station and Darling stations. On 3 February 1929 the line terminating at Darling was extended to East Malvern, and to Glen Waverley on 5 May 1930.

By 1932 the buildings had all been removed, but the whole of the trackwork remained in situ.

In 1948 the line from Camberwell terminating at Ashburton was re-opened a kilometre southwards to the new Alamein station.
