= Darling railway station =

Railway station in Melbourne, Australia

Darling
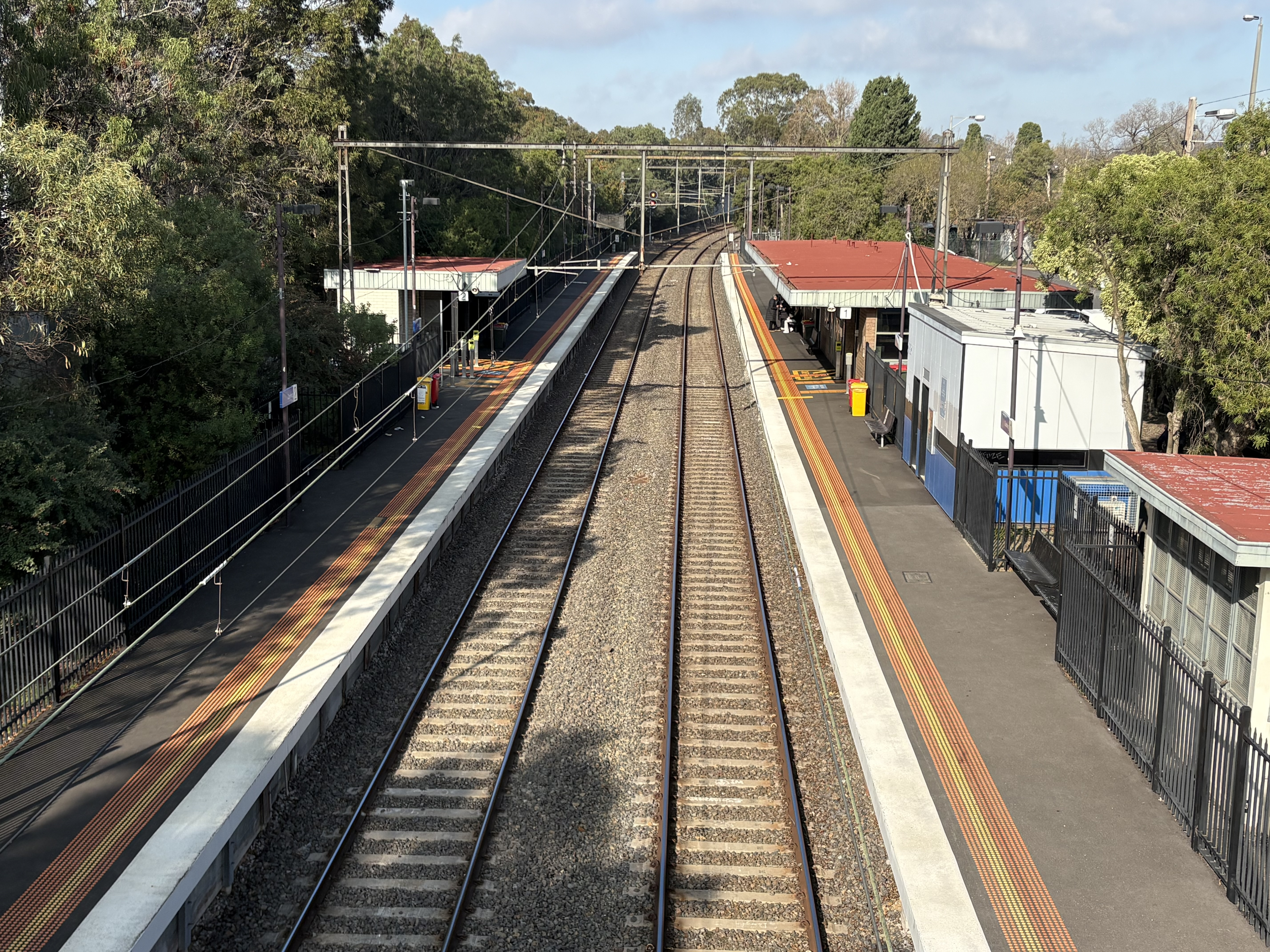
- Eastbound view from Pedestrian Footbridge, June 2026

General information
- Location: Clynden Avenue, Malvern East, Victoria 3145; City of Stonnington; Australia
- Coordinates: 37°52′08″S 145°03′46″E
- System: PTV commuter rail station
- Owner: VicTrack
- Operator: Metro Trains
- Line: Glen Waverley
- Distance: 12.68 kilometres from Southern Cross
- Platforms: 2 side
- Tracks: 2
- Connections: Bus

Construction
- Structure type: At-ground
- Parking: 200
- Cycle facilities: Yes
- Accessible: Yes—step free access

Other information
- Status: Operational, premium station
- Station code: DLG
- Fare zone: Myki zone 1/2
- Website: Public Transport Victoria

History
- Opened: 24 March 1890; 136 years ago
- Rebuilt: 1979
- Electrified: 1500 V DC overhead (December 1922)

Passengers
- 2005–2006: 269,296
- 2006–2007: 287,379 ▲6.71%
- 2007–2008: 318,471 ▲10.82%
- 2008–2009: 357,849 ▲12.36%
- 2009–2010: 352,654 ▼1.45%
- 2010–2011: 358,181 ▲1.57%
- 2011–2012: 323,138 ▼9.78%
- 2012–2013: Not Measured
- 2013–2014: 295,414 ▼8.57%
- 2014–2015: 304,091 ▲2.94%
- 2015–2016: 318,345 ▲4.69%
- 2016–2017: 323,202 ▲1.53%
- 2017–2018: 380,387 ▲17.69%
- 2018–2019: 361,300 ▼5.02%
- 2019–2020: 267,750 ▼25.89%
- 2020–2021: 120,400 ▼55.03%
- 2021–2022: 135,200 ▲12.29%
- 2022–2023: 245,850 ▲81.84%
- 2023–2024: 282,750 ▲15.01%
- 2024–2025: 262,650 ▼7.11%

Services
Preceding station	Metro Trains	Following station
Glen Iris towards Flinders Street	Glen Waverley line	East Malvern towards Glen Waverley

Former services
towards Burnley	Outer Circle connection	Waverley Road
	List of closed railway stations in Melbourne	
Track layout
Location

Darling station is a railway station operated by Metro Trains Melbourne on the Glen Waverley line, part of the Melbourne rail network. It serves Malvern East, a suburb of Melbourne, Australia.

The station opened on 24 March 1890 as part of the branch line from Burnley to Waverley Road station. The station consists of two side platforms accessed by a pedestrian bridge. There are two principal station buildings with one located on each platform. These buildings are both single story and act as customer service, staff, and waiting room facilities. These buildings were provided in 1979 as part of a station rebuild. The station is fully accessible and comply with DDA accessibility guidelines.

The station connects to the route 624 bus service. The journey to Southern Cross railway station is approximately 12.68 kilometres (7.88 mi) and takes 29 minutes.

== Description ==
Darling railway station is located in the suburb of Malvern East, a suburb of Melbourne, Victoria. The station is located nearby to the Malvern Road shopping precinct and Dorothy Laver Reserve West. The station is owned by VicTrack, a state government agency, and the station is operated by Metro Trains. The station is approximately 12.68 kilometres (7.88 mi), or a 29-minute train journey, from Southern Cross station. The adjacent stations are Glen Iris station up towards Melbourne, and East Malvern station down towards Glen Waverley. A crossover on the up side allows trains to reverse at this station in either direction.

The station consists of two side platforms with a total of two platform edges. Standard in Melbourne, the platform has an asphalt surface with concrete on the edges. The platforms are approximately 160 metres (524.93 ft) long, enough for a Metro Trains 7 car HCMT. The station features a pedestrian bridge, accessed from the centre of the platforms by a ramp built in 1987. The station features two principal station buildings, one of each side of the platforms built in 1979. These buildings act as staff facilities and passenger waiting rooms, and are constructed with cream bricks and ribbed roofing panels.

The station building, platform, and overpass are largely the same as when it was rebuilt in 1979, with the main change being updated signage, technology, and more car parking. The station features 200 car-parks on the south side of the station. The station is listed as a "fully accessible" station on the Metro Trains website, as the access ramp adheres to DDA accessibility standards.

== History ==
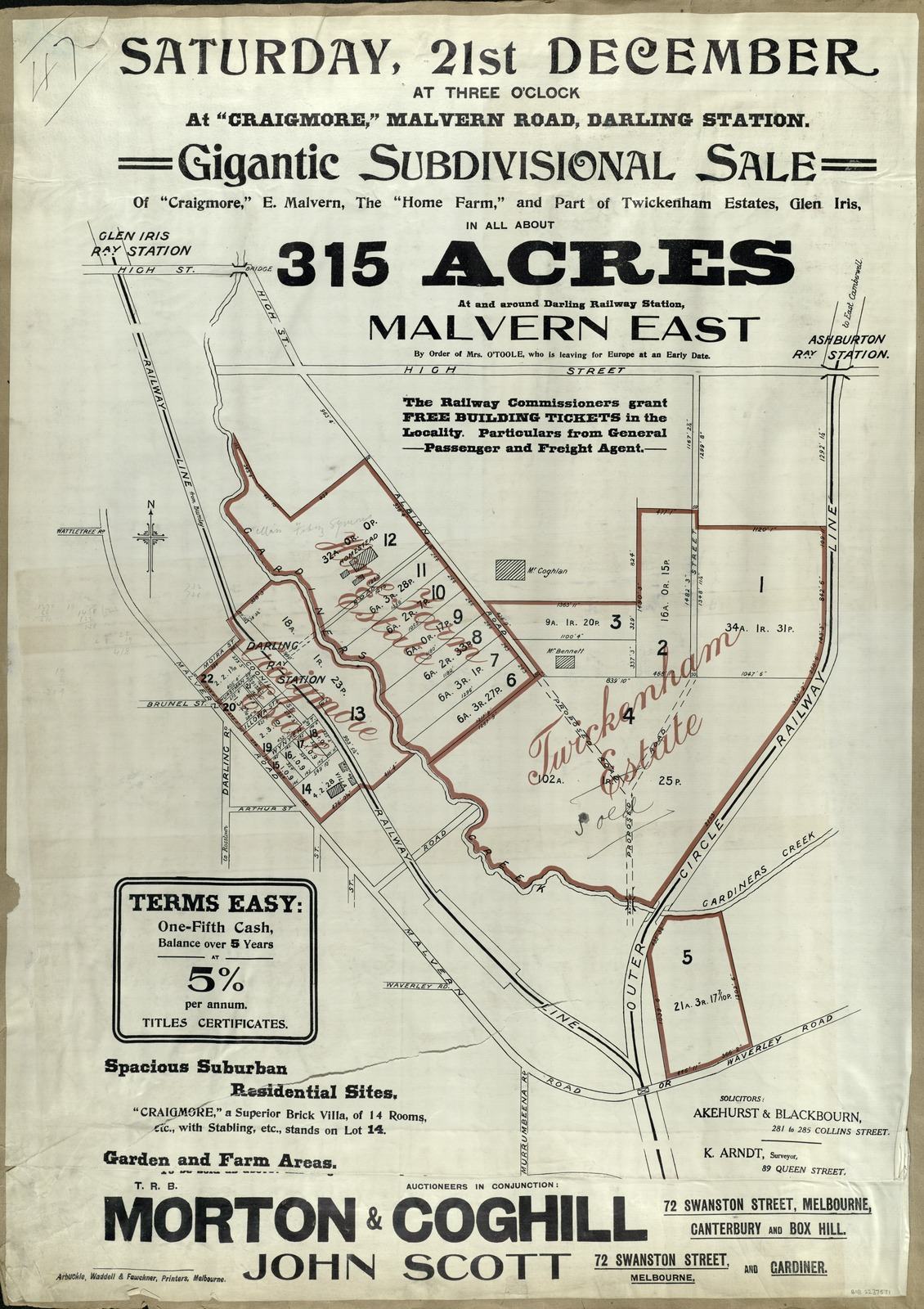
The subdivision of land around Darling station, 1907

Darling railway station was opened on 24 March 1890, with the line through the station originally built to link Burnley to the Outer Circle line at Waverley Road, before continuing onto Oakleigh. The station was named after the former Governor of Victoria, Sir Charles Henry Darling. The section of the line from Darling to Oakleigh station was closed on 9 December 1895, after 5 years of operation. The line was re-opened to Eastmalvern on 3 February 1929, with the line being extended further to Glen Waverley on 5 May 1930. In 1956, the line was duplicated, with three position signalling also provided. In 1974, the goods siding was closed after 59 years of operation since its opening in 1915.

The station was rebuilt in 1979 to coincide with the construction of the South Eastern Arterial link. This was the final station rebuild with the station buildings remaining almost the same into the 21st century. Until 1987, a level crossing was provided at Moira Street, located at the up end of the station. An overpass replaced the level crossing as part of the South Eastern Arterial link, built between Toorak and Warrigal Roads. Minor upgrades have occurred at the station since 1979, with the station being upgraded to a premium station in 2008 and a signal box located at Platform 1 being decommissioned on 8 June 2019.

== Platforms and services ==
Darling has two side platforms with two faces. The station is currently served by the Glen Waverley line, a service on the metropolitan rail network. The Glen Waverley line runs from Glen Waverley station south east of Melbourne, joining the Belgrave, Lilydale, and Alamein lines at Burnley station, before travelling through the City Loop.

Darling platform arrangement
Platform	Line	Destination	Service Type	Source
1	Glen Waverley line	Flinders Street	All stations and limited express services	
2	Glen Waverley line	Glen Waverley	All stations	

== Transport links ==
Darling station has one bus connection. The station connects to the route 624 bus service from Kew to Oakleigh station. The station does not have a bus interchange due to the limited number of transport links stopping at the station, and instead is operated through on-street bus stops. Darling station also has train replacement bus stops located adjacent to the station.

Bus connections:

- 624 : Kew – Oakleigh station
