= East Malvern railway station =

Railway station in Melbourne, Australia

East Malvern
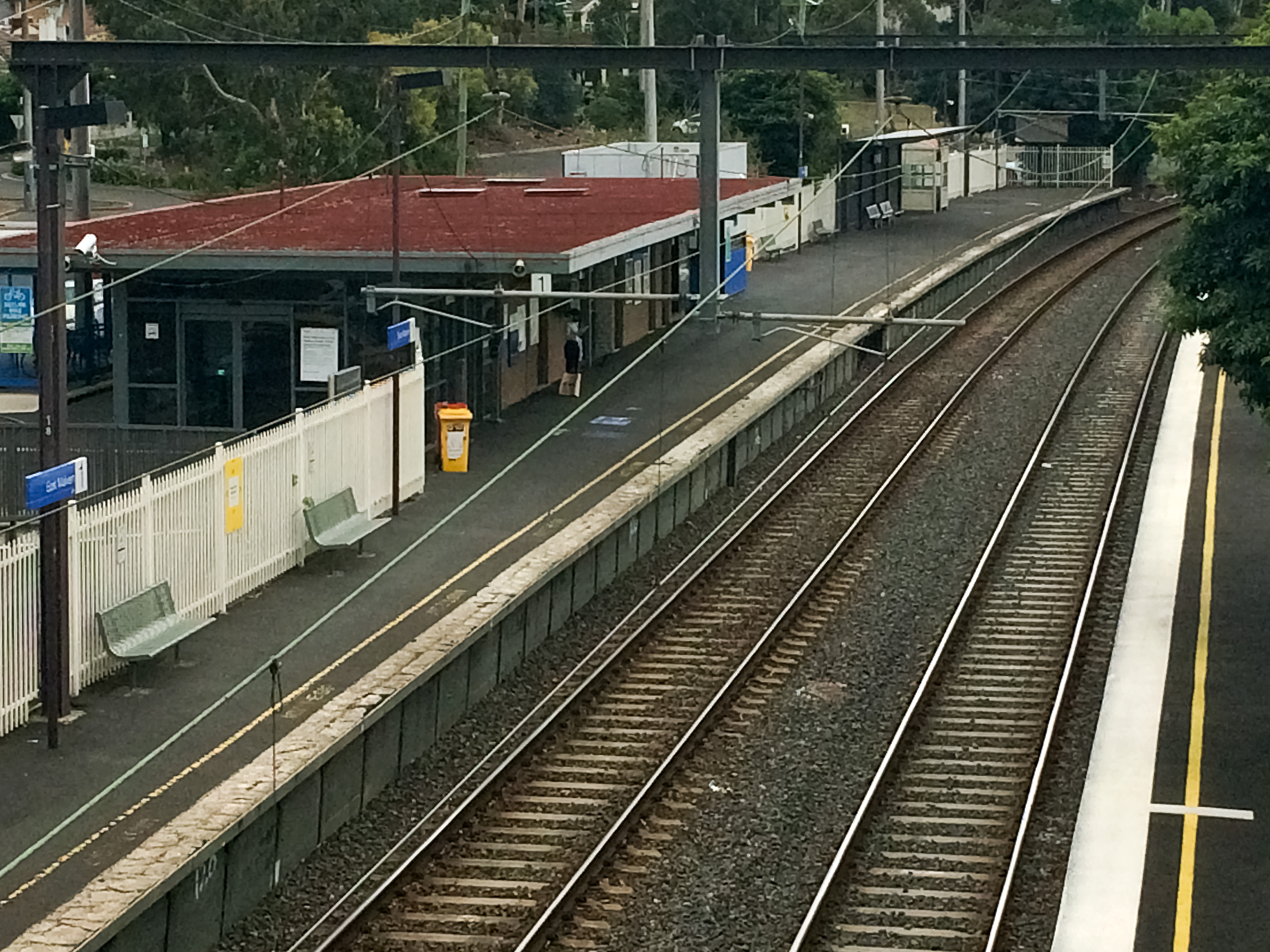
- Westbound view of the station platforms, January 2021

General information
- Location: Sylvester Crescent, Malvern East, Victoria 3145; City of Stonnington; Australia
- Coordinates: 37°52′37″S 145°04′10″E
- System: PTV commuter rail station
- Owner: VicTrack
- Operator: Metro Trains
- Line: Glen Waverley
- Distance: 13.75 kilometres from Southern Cross
- Platforms: 2 side
- Tracks: 2
- Connections: Bus

Construction
- Structure type: At-grade
- Parking: 676
- Cycle facilities: Yes (26 protected racks)
- Accessible: No — steep ramp

Other information
- Status: Operational, premium station
- Station code: EMV
- Fare zone: Myki zone 1/2
- Website: Public Transport Victoria

History
- Opened: 3 February 1929; 97 years ago
- Rebuilt: 1975
- Electrified: 1500 V DC overhead (May 1930)
- Former names: Eastmalvern (1929–1972)

Passengers
- 2017–2018: 493,806 ▲15.96%
- 2018–2019: 481,150 ▼2.56%
- 2019–2020: 400,500 ▼16.76%
- 2020–2021: 127,600 ▼68.14%
- 2021–2022: 176,600 ▲38.4%
- 2022–2023: 320,100 ▲81.25%
- 2023–2024: 335,300 ▲4.75%
- 2024–2025: 333,800 ▼0.45%

Services
Preceding station	Metro Trains	Following station
Darling towards Flinders Street	Glen Waverley line	Holmesglen towards Glen Waverley
Track layout
Location

East Malvern station is a railway station operated by Metro Trains Melbourne on the Glen Waverley line, which is part of the Melbourne rail network. It serves the eastern suburb of Malvern East, in Melbourne, Victoria, Australia. East Malvern station is a ground level staffed premium station, featuring two side platforms. It opened on 3 February 1929, with the current station provided in 1975.

The station was provisionally named Karnak. However, during construction, it was renamed to Eastmalvern.

Initially opened as Eastmalvern, the station was given its current name of East Malvern on 29 February 1972.

== History ==
The first section of what later became the Glen Waverley line opened on 3 March 1890, as part of the Outer Circle railway connecting Burnley and Oakleigh stations. After the Outer Circle line from Oakleigh to Camberwell was closed on 9 December 1895, trains from Melbourne terminated at Darling.

East Malvern station opened on 3 February 1929 as a one-stop extension of the Darling line. The line was extended from East Malvern to Glen Waverley in the following year.

Until the 1950s there was a dock platform at the down end of Platform 1, which could accommodate trains of up to three cars. However, it was typically used by a single swing-door "dogbox" car, which ran a shuttle service between East Malvern and Glen Waverley, because most off-peak trains terminated at East Malvern. Every second or third train to East Malvern connected with the Glen Waverley shuttle. The dock platform was abolished in 1954 after the restructuring of services. Two years later, the line between East Malvern and Darling was duplicated, with duplication from East Malvern to Mount Waverley occurring in 1964.

The station was rebuilt in 1975 due to the construction of the adjacent South Eastern Arterial link.

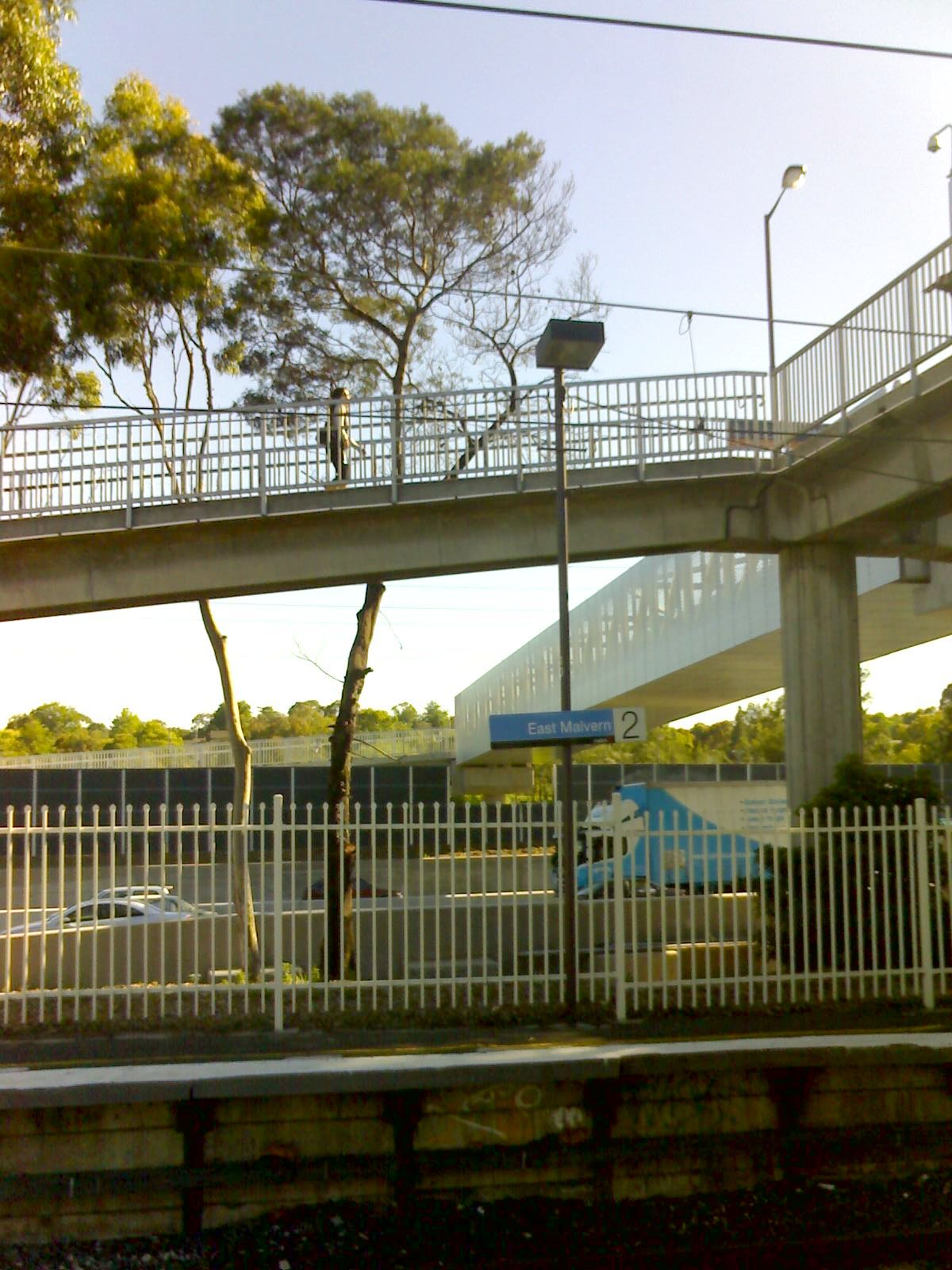
The new footbridge over the Monash Freeway, December 2009.

Around that time, parcel facilities were abolished. 1988 saw the opening of a pedestrian overpass serving both platforms, as well as crossing what had become by then the Monash Freeway. As part of the freeway project, the line was rerouted through an artificial tunnel, and a timber trestle bridge crossing a local creek was replaced. East Malvern was upgraded to a premium station on 21 August 1995.

There have been some minor changes in the 21st century, with the footbridge being rebuilt in 2009 to accommodate the widening of the Monash Freeway, and the provision of a Parkiteer secure bike cage next to the entrance of Platform 1 in the 2010s.

== Description ==
The station is close to the Waverley Road shopping precinct and Waverley Park. It is 13.75 kilometres (8.54 mi), or a 25-minute train journey, from Southern Cross station. The two platforms are approximately 160 metres (520 ft) long, with asphalt surfaces and concrete edges.

The station building, platforms, and overpass remain largely as when they were rebuilt in 1975, with the main changes being updated signage and more car parking. There are now 675 car parks on the south side of the station. On the Metro Trains website, the station is described as "assisted access", because the access ramp is too steep for wheelchair users to traverse on their own.

== Platforms and services ==
East Malvern has two side platforms. It is served by Glen Waverley line trains.

East Malvern platform arrangement
Platform	Line	Destination	Service Type	Source
1	Glen Waverley line	Flinders Street	All stations and limited express services	
2	Glen Waverley line	Glen Waverley	All stations	

== Transport links ==
East Malvern station connects with the route 612 bus service from Box Hill station to Chadstone Shopping Centre. The nearest bus stop is 200 metres away, in Malvern Road, although rail replacement bus stops are located adjacent to the station.

Bus connections:

- 612 : Box Hill station – Chadstone Shopping Centre
