= Box Hill to Ringwood Rail Trail =

Rail trail in Melbourne, Australia

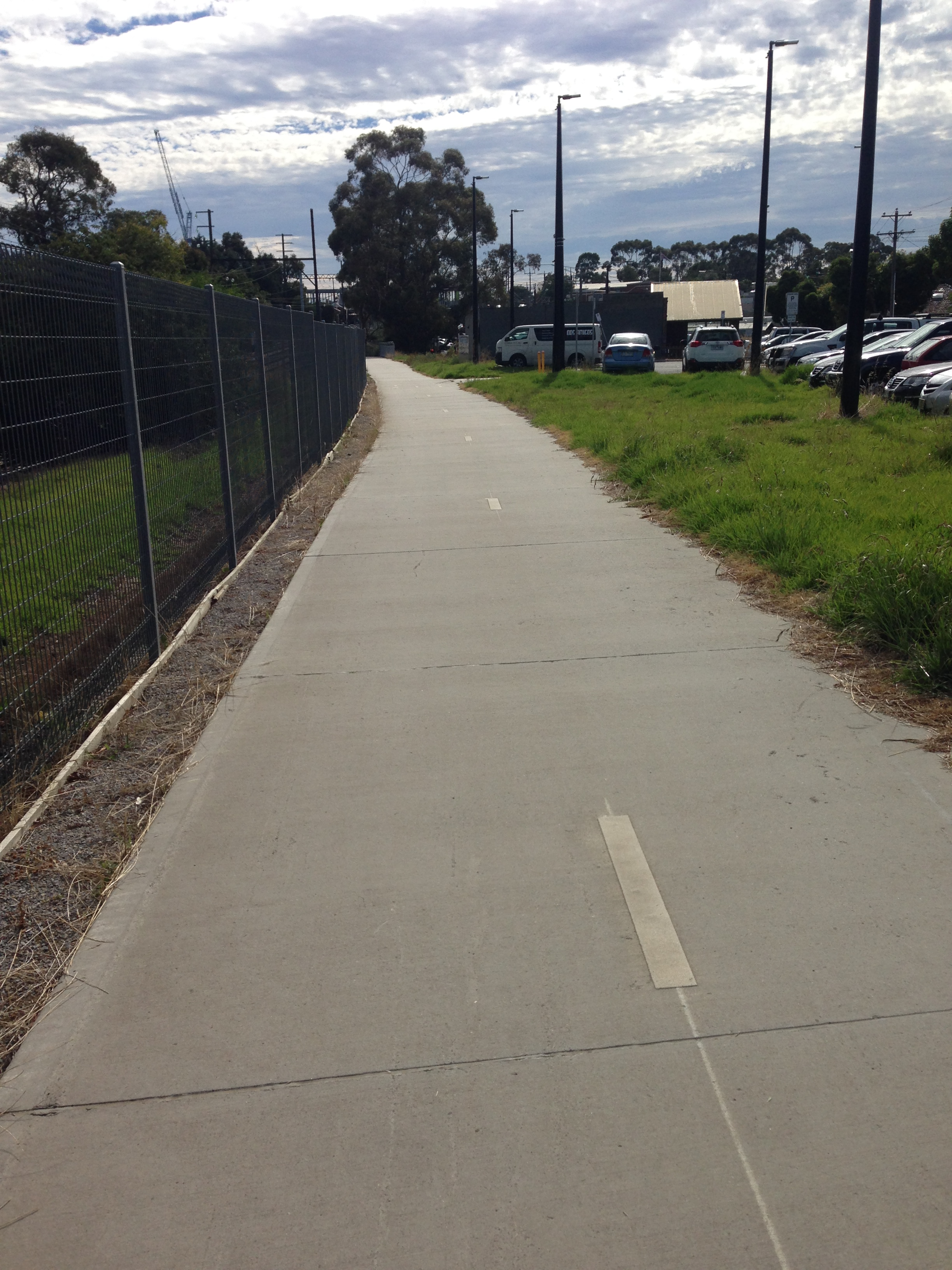
- The trail near Ringwood railway station
- Length: 10km
- Location: Melbourne, Victoria, Australia
- Difficulty: Easy to medium
- Hazards: Incomplete on-road section in Laburnum-Blackburn section
- Surface: Concrete
- Hills: Around Mitcham and Nunawading
- Trains: Belgrave line and Lilydale line
- Parking: Adjacent railway stations

The Box Hill to Ringwood Rail Trail is a shared use path that runs alongside the Belgrave and Lilydale Lines in the east of Melbourne, Australia. The route serves a total of seven railway stations. The bike path is incomplete, as the section between Blackburn and Laburnum is yet to be constructed.

== Construction ==
Construction on the bike path first began in Mitcham in 2013, done alongside the railway grade separation at Mitcham Road. The first section, from Walkers Road in Nunawading to Mitcham Station, was eventually completed in 2014. The Box Hill section of the project was split into two parts, the first commencing in late 2014 and the second in early 2018. The first section was from Box Hill station to Linsley Street in Box Hill. Work was completed on this section in May 2015. The second section was from Linsley Street to Middleborough Road, completed in August 2019. In May 2017, the Blackburn section (The Blackburn station and Blackburn road precinct) and the Heatherdale section (Mitcham Road to Eastlink) were completed. In 2018, the Ringwood section (Eastlink to Ringwood) was completed. After that, the only sections to be completed were the Nunawading station precinct section, which was completed in August 2019, and the Laburnum section, which is yet to commence.

== Trail route ==
=== Box Hill to Laburnum ===
The trail begins on Bank Street, on the opposite side of Station Street to the Box Hill Station and Box Hill Central shopping centre. It briefly starts on road, but turns off onto a shared use path next to the road. It continues along this off-road path for about 1.9 kilometres, with a connection onto Whitehorse Road and Box Hill High School, before it reaches Middleborough Road. It does not intersect with Middleborough Road, rather, a steep ramp winds underneath the road. The trail shares the footpath with Middleborough Road for a short distance before continuing on a decline towards Laburnum. There is a ramp connection onto the Laburnum station platforms, but the main path continues onto Laburnum Street.

=== Laburnum to Blackburn ===
This section of the trail has not been constructed, and is due to begin being constructed around mid-2020. This proposed section of path will run along Laburnum Street, then turn onto Main Street to meet with Blackburn Station.

=== Blackburn to Nunawading ===
This section of the trail begins on the Blackburn Station concourse, running alongside South Parade, and then underneath Blackburn Road. It then follows the rail line for 2 kilometres, with connections onto Oliver Avenue and Morton Park. It bypasses Nunawading Christian College and Laughlin Avenue, and runs parallel to Nunawading Station, and finishes at the set of traffic lights at the Springvale Road.

=== Nunawading to Mitcham ===
This part of the trail begins winding through the Nunawading Station concourse towards Walkers Road. It is eventually pushed onto Walkers Road, where the bike path connects with HOME HQ Nunawading, but then goes into an off-road path which runs until Rooks Road. At Rooks Road there is a set of traffic lights with priority for patrons using the path. The path continues straight, past the Mitcham Station car parking areas, into the Mitcham Station bus bays, then turns right, goes through the concourse and finishes at Mitcham Road.

=== Mitcham to Heatherdale ===
The trail crosses Mitcham road and goes down a sharp decline on Brunswick Road. This decline flattens out and the path separates from Brunswick Road around 250 metres after the intersection with Mitcham Road. The path is then again running alongside the rail line with much tree cover. The trail then goes over Cochrane Street on a bridge, built to keep the trail from having a sharp decline and incline. It continues up until Talbot Street, where it crosses over the rail line to the Tennyson Street side, and continues towards Heatherdale Station, with a slight decline onto Heatherdale Road. The intersection at Heatherdale road also has traffic lights which prioritise users of the bike path.

=== Heatherdale to Ringwood ===
After crossing Heatherdale Road, the bike path continues along the southern part of the station, running down until it reaches Molan Street. It then uses the Molan Street bridge to cross over the Eastlink. It then merges with the Eastlink trail for a brief distance, before heading northward and then eastward, adjacent to the rail line. It continues until the Albert Street intersection, where there is a set of prioritised traffic lights for users of the path. It then continues on a low incline until it diverges away from Albert Street and runs with the rail line. It connects with Thanet Court and runs alongside the station parking until it intersects with Wantirna Road, where there are traffic lights without priority for users of the path. It then runs along Station Street until it reaches Ringwood Station, and connects with the Ringwood-Belgrave Rail Trail. This is where the trail finishes.

== Connections ==
Beginning at Box Hill, the rail trail connects with the Box Hill Activity Precinct. Not long after this it connects with Box Hill Town Hall, and the Linsley Street Reserve. The Box Hill section also has connections into Box Hill High School, Box Hill Cemetery and Whitehorse Road. After Middleborough Road it runs through Laburnum Park, and connects with the station and the shops on Salisbury Avenue. In the Blackburn - Nunawading section, it connects with the Blackburn Station Precinct on South Parade and Blackburn Road, as well as the Blackburn Library and Blackburn Tennis Club. It also connects to Morton Park. Towards Nunawading, it connects with Oliver Avenue, which leads down towards Blackburn Lake sanctuary, which also leads to the Gardiners Creek Trail In the Nunawading - Mitcham section, it connects with the Nunawading Station Precinct, as well as HOME HQ Nunawading. It connects with Rooks Road, which leads to the pipe track trail that runs through Mitcham to Burwood East and Mount Waverley. It connects with the Mitcham Station Precinct and the Britannia Mall. In the Mitcham - Heatherdale section, it connects to the nearby Heatherdale pre-school, as well as Heatherdale Station. In the final Heatherdale - Ringwood section, it connects with the Ringwood Retirement Village, Eastland Shopping Centre and the Ringwood RSL.
