= Stone Pipe Organ =

Musical organ in Melbourne, Victoria, Australia

- Location of the organ in Melbourne
- Interactive map of Stone Pipe Organ
- 37°49′22″S 145°09′08″E
- Type: Pipe organ
- Location: 40-44 Blackburn Road, Blackburn, Melbourne, Victoria, Australia
- Part of: The Avenue Uniting Church

History
- Built: 1879; 147 years ago
- Built by: William Stone
- Built for: Congregational Church of Australia
- Original use: Congregational Church, St Kilda (1879–1888); St John's Congregational Church, St Kilda South (1888–1973)
- Rebuilt: 1973 in current location

Site notes
- Restored by: Laurie Pipe Organs (1973)
- Condition: Excellent
- Current use: Church use; worship
- Owner: Uniting Church in Australia, Synod of Victoria and Tasmania
- Public access: Yes
- Website: avenueuniting.org

Victorian Heritage Register
- Official name: Stone Pipe Organ
- Type: Registered (item)
- Designated: 14 August 2008
- Reference no.: H2166
- Category: Religion

The Stone Pipe Organ is a pipe organ built by William Stone in 1879. It is located inside The Avenue Uniting Church, at 40-44 Blackburn Road, on the corner of The Avenue, in Blackburn, an eastern suburb of Melbourne, in Victoria, Australia.

The organ was added to the Victorian Heritage Register on 14 August 2008 in recognition of its historical significance. The Victorian branch of the National Trust added to the organ to its non-statutory heritage list on 28 July 1983.

It is the only organ that was built by Stone known to have survived intact.

== History ==
The organ was built in 1879 by William Stone for the Congregational Church of Australia for use at its church on Alma Road in St Kilda. When the small church was demolished in 1888, it was moved to the St John's Congregational Church, in St Kilda South. In 1973, The Avenue Presbyterian (now Uniting) Church in Blackburn purchased the organ was purchased for A$1,200, (Note: The Victorian Heritage Register states A₤1,200. However, Australian dollars are most likely, given that decimal currency was introduced in Australia in 1966.) at the instigation of the church's organist Dr William (Bill) Ralph. The Blackburn church was designed by Keith Reid and completed in 1960. The organ was restored and re-erected by members of the congregation under the direction of Ralph. Laurie Pipe Organs were responsible for regulating the action and pipework. The re-opening recital was given by Ted King on 5 August 1973, and a recital was given in October 1979 to mark the centenary of the instrument.

== Description ==
The Stone pipe organ is installed in a gallery at the rear of The Avenue Uniting Church. It is a well-designed instrument with an attractive pine case, and exhibits a generous use of good materials and high quality workmanship. The organ has an unusually bright and clear sound and is thus a fine example for the period. Its original bellows, including hand-blowing, have been retained intact. The pipework is cone tuned. All of the metal pipework is of spotted metal—a mixture of tin and lead—including the front pipes. Work carried out in 1973 included stripping of dark varnish from the case timbers, the removal of gold paint from the front pipes, and the raising of wooden supports in the side towers to cover the pipe tops.

The organ is largely intact, retaining its original pipework, action, soundboards and windchest, console and case. The builder's nameplate is attached above the keyboard. It has two manuals, thirteen speaking stops, three couplers, and a mechanical action.

=== Disposition ===
The organ has the following disposition; all measurements are in feet:

GREAT		SWELL		PEDAL	
Open diapason	8	Violin diapason	8	Open diapason	16
Stopped diapason	8	Lieblich gedact	8	Octave (Note: Subsequently disconnected.)	8
Clarabella	8	Geigen principal	4		
Viol di gamba	8	Piccolo	2		
Salicional	8	Clarionet	8		
Octave	4				
Flute	4				
Fifteenth	2				

== See also ==
- List of pipe organs
