= Blackburn railway station, Melbourne =

Railway station in Melbourne, Australia

Blackburn
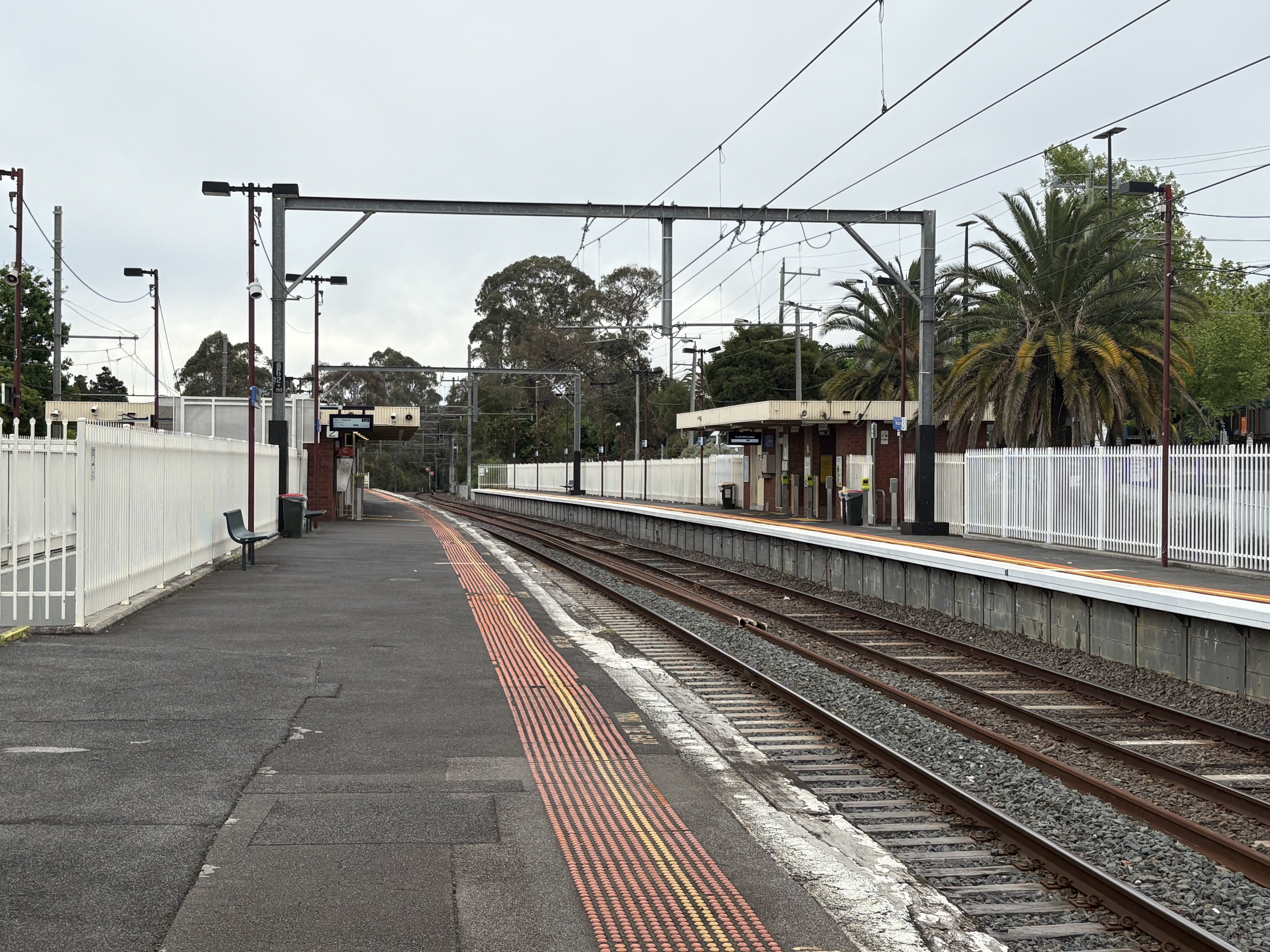
- Westbound view from Platform 2, October 2025

General information
- Location: Railway Road, Blackburn, Victoria 3130; City of Whitehorse; Australia
- Coordinates: 37°49′12″S 145°09′00″E
- System: PTV commuter rail station
- Owner: VicTrack
- Operator: Metro Trains
- Lines: Lilydale; Belgrave
- Distance: 18.67 kilometres from Southern Cross
- Platforms: 3 (1 island, 1 side)
- Tracks: 3
- Connections: Bus

Construction
- Structure type: Ground
- Parking: 112
- Cycle facilities: Yes
- Accessible: Yes—step free access

Other information
- Status: Operational, premium station
- Station code: BBN
- Fare zone: Myki zone 2
- Website: Public Transport Victoria

History
- Opened: 25 December 1882; 143 years ago
- Rebuilt: 5 October 1980
- Electrified: January 1923 (1500 V DC overhead)

Passengers
- 2005–2006: 1,014,262
- 2006–2007: 1,109,553 ▲9.39%
- 2007–2008: 1,214,721 ▲9.47%
- 2008–2009: 1,122,865 ▼7.56%
- 2009–2010: 1,236,781 ▲10.14%
- 2010–2011: 1,219,206 ▼1.42%
- 2011–2012: 1,258,705 ▲3.23%
- 2012–2013: Not measured
- 2013–2014: 1,406,269 ▲11.72%
- 2014–2015: 1,301,918 ▼7.42%
- 2015–2016: 1,402,790 ▲7.74%
- 2016–2017: 1,326,409 ▼5.44%
- 2017–2018: 1,440,091 ▲8.57%
- 2018–2019: 1,484,400 ▲3.07%
- 2019–2020: 1,185,100 ▼20.16%
- 2020–2021: 533,050 ▼55.02%
- 2021–2022: 607,450 ▲13.95%
- 2022–2023: 777,500 ▲27.99%
- 2023–2024: 1,230,050 ▲58.21%
- 2024–2025: 1,206,950 ▼1.88%

Services
Preceding station	Metro Trains	Following station
Laburnum towards Flinders Street	Lilydale line	Nunawading towards Belgrave or Lilydale
Laburnum towards Flinders Street	Belgrave line	Nunawading towards Belgrave or Lilydale
Laburnum towards Flinders Street	Belgrave line	Terminus
Express services
Box Hill towards Flinders Street	Lilydale line Weekdays only	Nunawading towards Belgrave or Lilydale
Box Hill towards Flinders Street	Belgrave line Weekdays only	Nunawading towards Belgrave or Lilydale
Track layout
Location

Blackburn station is a railway station operated by Metro Trains Melbourne on the Belgrave and Lilydale lines, which are both part of the Melbourne rail network. It serves the eastern suburb of Blackburn, in Melbourne, Victoria, Australia. Blackburn station is a ground level premium station, featuring three platforms, an island platform with two faces and one side platform connected by an accessible underground concourse. It opened on 25 December 1882, with the current station provided in 1980.

== History ==
On 1 December 1882, the railway line from Melbourne to Camberwell was extended to Lilydale. At this time, the Lilydale line had only a single track, and used a token-based system of signalling. On 12 August 1889, Blackburn was designated a 'crossing station', meaning that it had a loop line to allow trains to pass each other. In December 1891, a second track was added to the section of the Lilydale line, between Box Hill and Ringwood. At this time, Blackburn had two platforms.

In the late 1890s, services terminating at Blackburn began, due to the large number of passengers visiting the Blackburn Lake Sanctuary. However, there were relatively few trains passing through Blackburn; around two trains per hour in 1901.

On 17 December 1922, the Lilydale line was electrified as far as Box Hill. By the end of January 1923, electrification had proceeded past Blackburn, as far as Ringwood.

Automatic signalling, which had reached Box Hill in 1929, was finally extended to Blackburn on 13 July 1958. However, automatic signalling was not installed between Blackburn and Mitcham until 13 November 1960. In 1970, boom barriers replaced hand gates at the former Blackburn Road level crossing, which was located nearby in the down direction of the station.

By October 1977, the goods yard was closed to traffic. In 1980, the goods siding was removed and the old station was demolished (although part of the south platform building remains). It was replaced with a three-platform station, so trains could terminate while Box Hill was being rebuilt. A new ramp from the old pedestrian underpass now provides pedestrian access to the central island platform. Victorian Railways' plan in the late 1970s was to add the third track to the south, but Nunawading Council objected.

On 4 June 1996, Blackburn was upgraded to a premium station. By 2001, all services that formerly terminated at Box Hill had been extended to Blackburn.

In late 2006 and early 2007, grade separation works at the Middleborough Road level crossing, near Laburnum, led to the closure of the line between Box Hill and Blackburn, and the construction of a temporary bus interchange at the station for buses which replaced train services. The car-park immediately to the north of Platform 3 was converted into an interchange, and a walkway was constructed to allow passengers to cross from the island platform to the interchange. In early 2010, Blackburn again performed this role, when grade separation was undertaken at Springvale Road and Nunawading was rebuilt, and again in 2014, when Mitcham Road and Rooks Road at Mitcham were separated.

From late 2016 to early 2017, as part of the Level Crossing Removal Project, the station and line were shut down for the grade separation and removal of the level crossing at Blackburn Road. In early February 2017, Blackburn Road and the railway line reopened. The project also included two new lift shafts from the island platform to the underpass, and to nearby Railway Road. Also occurring in that year, the former signal box at the station was abolished, with control transferred to Ringwood.

== Platforms, facilities and services ==
Blackburn has one island platform with two faces and one side platform. The island platform features a ticket office and toilets.

Platform 3 is only used on weekdays during peak hours (when trains are terminating on Platform 2). This typically occurs from early morning; 7am-12:30pm, and mid afternoon; 3:30–6:30pm.

It is serviced by Metro Trains' Lilydale and Belgrave line services.

Blackburn platform arrangement
Platform	Line	Destination	Via	Service Type	Notes	Source
1	Belgrave line Lilydale line	Flinders Street	City Loop	All stations and limited express services	See City Loop for operating patterns	
2	Belgrave line Lilydale line	Flinders Street	City Loop	All stations and limited express services	Weekdays only. See City Loop for operating patterns.	
2	Belgrave line Lilydale line	Lilydale, Belgrave		All stations	Weekends only.	
3	Belgrave line Lilydale line	Ringwood, Mooroolbark, Lilydale, Upper Ferntree Gully, Belgrave		All stations and limited express services	Weekdays only.	

== Transport links ==
Kinetic Melbourne operates three bus routes via Blackburn station, under contract to Public Transport Victoria:

- 271 : Box Hill station – Ringwood station
- 279 : Box Hill station – Westfield Doncaster (deviation)
- SmartBus 901 : Frankston station – Melbourne Airport

Ventura Bus Lines operates three routes via Blackburn station, under contract to Public Transport Victoria:

- SmartBus 703 : to Middle Brighton station
- 736 : to Mitcham station via Glen Waverley station
- 765 : Mitcham station – Box Hill station
