= Laburnum railway station =

Railway station in Melbourne, Australia

Laburnum
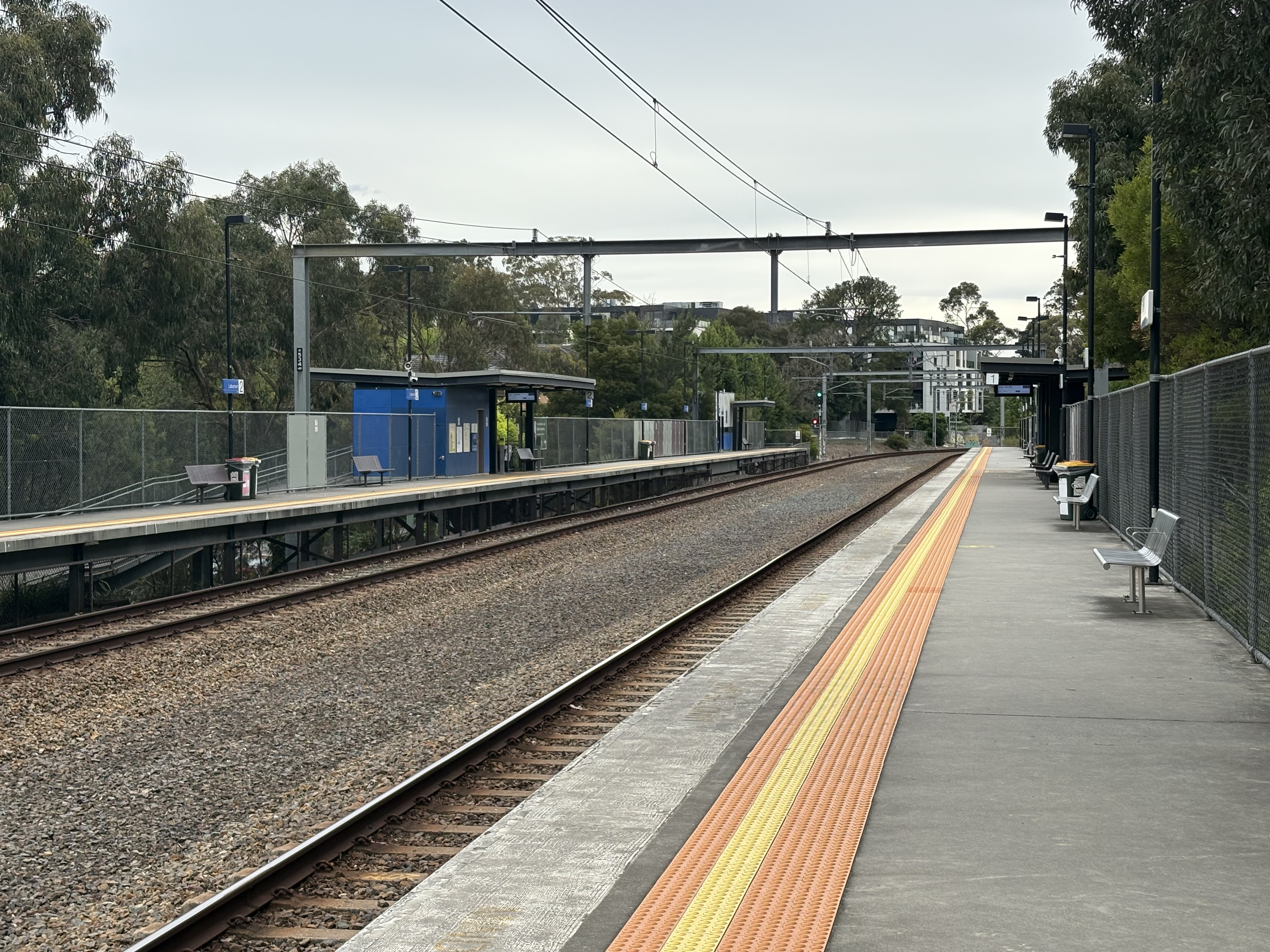
- Eastbound view from Platform 1, October 2025

General information
- Location: Laburnum Street, Blackburn, Victoria 3130; City of Whitehorse; Australia
- Coordinates: 37°49′15″S 145°08′27″E
- System: PTV commuter rail station
- Owner: VicTrack
- Operator: Metro Trains
- Lines: Lilydale; Belgrave
- Distance: 17.83 kilometres from Southern Cross
- Platforms: 2 side
- Tracks: 2
- Connections: Bus

Construction
- Structure type: Ground
- Parking: Yes
- Accessible: Yes—step free access

Other information
- Status: Operational, unstaffed
- Station code: LAB
- Fare zone: Myki zone 2
- Website: Public Transport Victoria

History
- Opened: 13 July 1958; 68 years ago
- Rebuilt: 29 January 2007
- Electrified: January 1923 (1500 V DC overhead)

Passengers
- 2005–2006: 313,114
- 2006–2007: 322,793 ▲3.09%
- 2007–2008: 406,707 ▲25.99%
- 2008–2009: 410,312 ▲0.88%
- 2009–2010: 442,678 ▲7.89%
- 2010–2011: 443,045 ▲0.082%
- 2011–2012: 374,282 ▼15.52%
- 2012–2013: Not measured
- 2013–2014: 350,078 ▼6.46%
- 2014–2015: 354,269 ▲1.19%
- 2015–2016: 392,272 ▲10.72%
- 2016–2017: 372,562 ▼5.02%
- 2017–2018: 403,302 ▲8.25%
- 2018–2019: 414,700 ▲2.82%
- 2019–2020: 340,950 ▼17.78%
- 2020–2021: 153,150 ▼55.08%
- 2021–2022: 167,650 ▲9.27%
- 2022–2023: 208,400 ▲24.31%
- 2023–2024: 291,150 ▲39.97%
- 2024–2025: 316,900 ▲8.84%

Services
Preceding station	Metro Trains	Following station
Box Hill towards Flinders Street	Lilydale line	Blackburn towards Lilydale
Box Hill towards Flinders Street	Belgrave line	Blackburn towards Belgrave
Track layout
Location

Laburnum station is a railway station operated by Metro Trains Melbourne on the Belgrave and Lilydale lines, which are part of the Melbourne rail network. It serves the eastern suburb of Blackburn, in Melbourne, Victoria, Australia. It opened on 13 July 1958, with the current station provided in 2007.

== History ==
Laburnum station was named after the locality of Laburnum, itself named after the shrub of the same name. The original station had two side platforms, with a substantial brick building on Platform 1, and a small brick shelter on Platform 2. In that year the hand-operated gates at the former Middleborough Road level crossing were replaced by with boom barriers. The crossing was in the up direction from the station.

The Middleborough Road grade separation project involved lowering the line eight metres below the road. That required the rebuilding of the station, and the removal of the bend in Laburnum Street beneath it. In October 2006, the station buildings were demolished and, on 29 January 2007, the rebuilt station opened. As part of the project, provision was made for the future installation of a third track.

=== Toot Toot – drive slowly sign ===
Laburnum was once known for having a sign reading "Toot Toot – drive slowly" under the railway bridge which crosses Laburnum Street, because the street was narrow and had a sharp bend at that point. Drivers would often sound their car horns, as instructed by the sign, to warn oncoming, and possibly unseen, traffic that might be approaching the narrow underpass. Infuriated neighbours frequently attempted to remove the sign by painting over it, but to no avail, because the local council would restore the sign every time.

When the station was rebuilt following the 2007 grade separation, the road underpass was substantially widened, so the sign was deemed unnecessary and was removed. A plaque was erected which commemorated the sign and outlined its history, although that has since been removed.

== Platforms and services ==
Laburnum has two side platforms and is served by Lilydale and Belgrave line trains.

Laburnam platform arrangement
Platform	Line	Destination	Via	Service Type	Notes	Source
1	Belgrave line Lilydale line	Flinders Street	City Loop	All stations and limited express services	See City Loop for operating patterns	
2	Belgrave line Lilydale line	Blackburn, Ringwood, Lilydale, Belgrave		All stations		

== Transport links ==
Kinetic Melbourne operates two bus routes via Laburnum station, under contract to Public Transport Victoria:

- 271 : Box Hill station – Ringwood station
- 279 : Box Hill station – Westfield Doncaster (deviation)

== Gallery ==
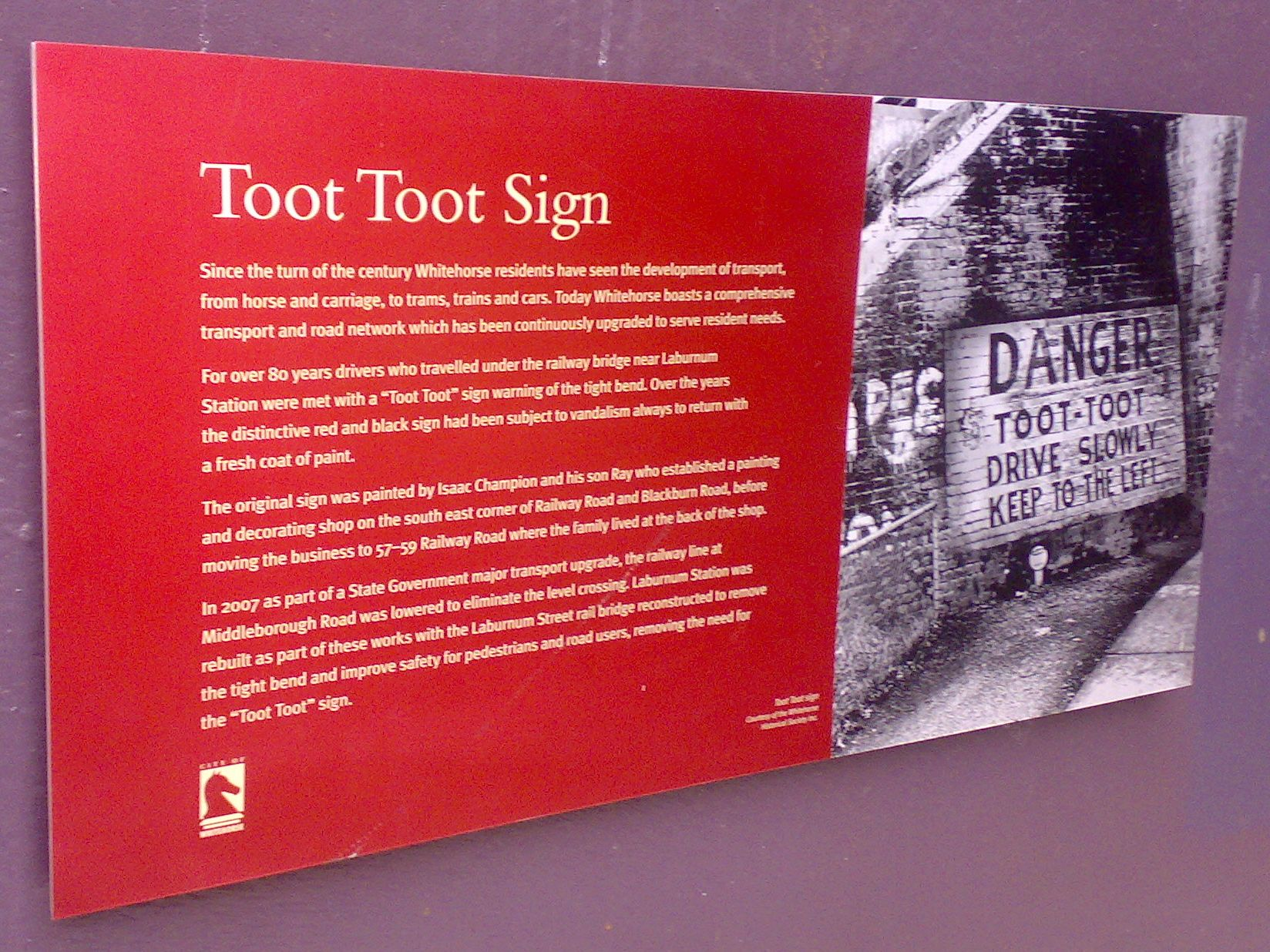
Plaque commemorating the Laburnum Railway Station 'Toot-Toot' sign, January 2008
