= Box Hill railway station, Melbourne =

Railway station in Box Hill, Melbourne, Victoria, Australia

Box Hill
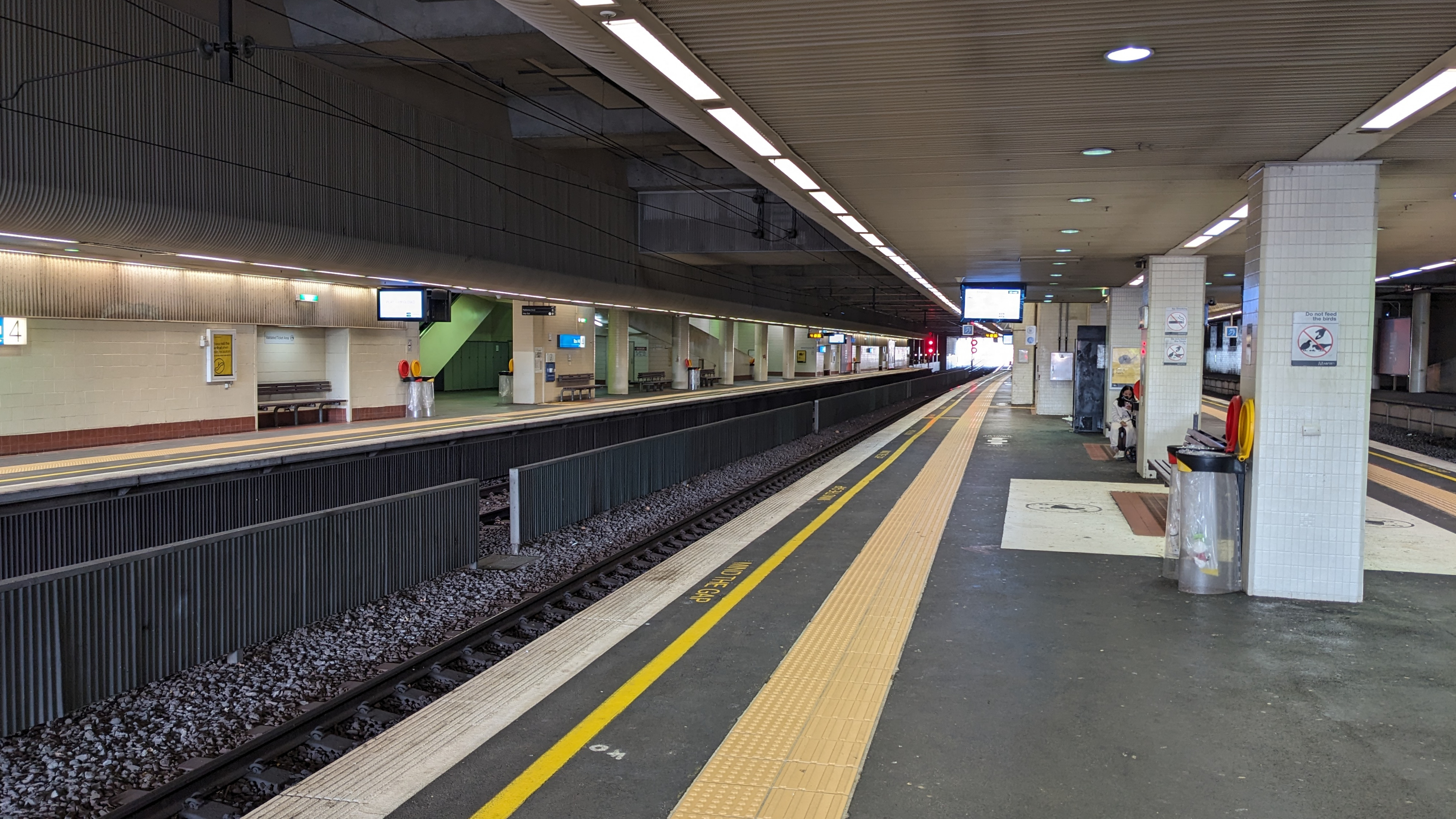
- Eastbound view from Platform 3, August 2024

General information
- Location: Station Street, Box Hill, Victoria 3128; City of Whitehorse; Australia
- Coordinates: 37°49′09″S 145°07′17″E
- System: PTV commuter rail station
- Owner: VicTrack
- Operator: Metro Trains
- Lines: Lilydale; Belgrave
- Distance: 16.12 kilometres from Southern Cross
- Platforms: 4 (1 island, 2 side)
- Tracks: 3 (Platform 1 has no track)
- Connections: Bus; Tram; Coach; SkyBus

Construction
- Parking: 500
- Cycle facilities: Yes
- Accessible: Yes—step free access

Other information
- Status: Operational, premium station
- Station code: BOX
- Fare zone: Myki zone 2
- Website: Public Transport Victoria

History
- Opened: 1 December 1882; 143 years ago
- Rebuilt: 1983–1985
- Electrified: December 1922 (1500 V DC overhead)

Passengers
- 2005–2006: 2,327,976
- 2006–2007: 2,685,655 ▲15.36%
- 2007–2008: 2,913,572 ▲8.49%
- 2008–2009: 3,025,913 ▲3.86%
- 2009–2010: 3,160,572 ▲4.45%
- 2010–2011: 3,160,397 ▼0.01%
- 2011–2012: 2,742,972 ▼13.21%
- 2012–2013: Not measured
- 2013–2014: 3,253,534 ▲18.61%
- 2014–2015: 3,260,422 ▲0.21%
- 2015–2016: 3,487,764 ▲6.97%
- 2016–2017: 3,779,400 ▲8.36%
- 2017–2018: 3,660,554 ▼3.14%
- 2018–2019: 3,685,483 ▲0.68%
- 2019–2020: 2,775,200 ▼24.7%
- 2020–2021: 1,192,700 ▼57.02%
- 2021–2022: 1,387,500 ▲16.33%
- 2022–2023: 1,924,250 ▲38.68%
- 2023–2024: 2,535,000 ▲31.74%
- 2024–2025: 2,648,350 ▲4.47%

Services
Preceding station	Metro Trains	Following station
Union towards Flinders Street	Lilydale line	Laburnum towards Lilydale
Union towards Flinders Street	Belgrave line	Laburnum towards Belgrave
Express services
Camberwell towards Flinders Street	Lilydale line Weekdays only	Blackburn towards Lilydale
Camberwell towards Flinders Street	Belgrave line Weekdays only	Blackburn towards Belgrave
Future
Burwood (SRL) towards Southland	Suburban Rail Loop East (under construction)	Terminus
Former services
Preceding station	Disused railways	Following station
Mont Albert	Lilydale line	Line open
Mont Albert	Belgrave line	Line open
Track layout
Location

Box Hill station is a railway station operated by Metro Trains Melbourne on the Belgrave and Lilydale lines, both part of the Melbourne rail network. It serves the eastern suburb of Box Hill, in Melbourne, Victoria, Australia. Box Hill is a below ground premium station, featuring four platforms, an island platform with two faces and two side platforms connected by a ground level precinct. It opened on 1 December 1882, with the current station provided in 1985.

The station is located beneath the Box Hill Central shopping centre. East of the station, towards Lilydale and Belgrave, the three tracks merge into two.

== History ==
Box Hill station opened on 1 December 1882 when the railway line from Camberwell was extended to Lilydale. When the station opened, Box Hill was a separate town with several hundred residents. It was named in 1861 after Box Hill in Surrey, England, which was the birthplace of the local postmaster. In 1895, a large market was opened next to the station.

On 19 December 1922, the section of line from Flinders Street to Box Hill was electrified, and that was extended to Ringwood the following month.

In 1971, the current centre line between East Camberwell and Box Hill was provided. It was also in that year that the overpass over Elgar Road was opened, located in the up direction from the station, replacing a level crossing.

On 29 December 1976, goods services to and from the station ceased.

In 1979, the station was one of three used as trial sites for new bike lockers under the Melbourne Bicycle Strategy, either for occasional, monthly or quarterly hire.

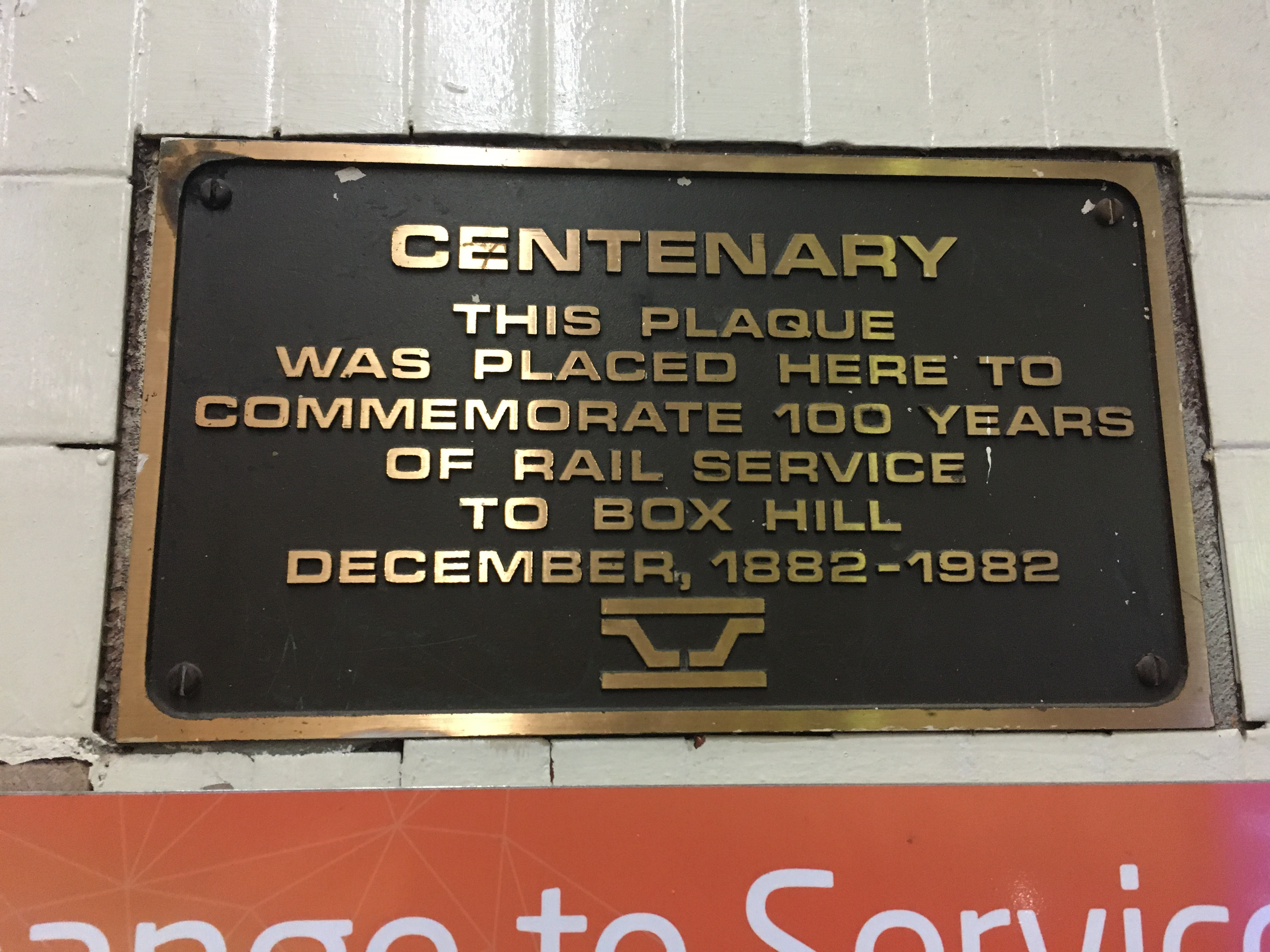
A plaque by VicRail commemorating 100 years of rail service to Box Hill

Beginning in early 1983, construction started on rebuilding the station below ground, as part of the project to eliminate the level crossing at Station Street, which was at the eastern end of the station. Box Hill Central Shopping Centre and the bus terminus were built over the top of the station, with the complex being completed in 1985. Platform 1 was used between 24 April 1983 and 9 June 1984, while the rest of the new station was being built, and has been retained for possible future use. The platform has no track or lighting, and a McDonald's restaurant has been built over the ramp from the station concourse.

On 18 July 1996, Box Hill was upgraded to a premium station.

During January 2007, the line was closed between Box Hill and Blackburn, to facilitate grade separation works at the Middleborough Road level crossing, near Laburnum. A rail replacement bus service operated between the two stations for the duration and, to cater for that, a temporary bus interchange was constructed at Box Hill. The interchange was built directly on top of the tracks, which had been paved between the rails to the east of the station, and was connected to Platforms 2 and 3 via a raised walkway. With the completion of the major works at the end of January 2007, the bus interchange was removed.

During the 2017/2018 financial year, with 3.254 million passenger movements, Box Hill was the tenth-busiest station on Melbourne's metropolitan network, as well as being the busiest non-interchange station outside of the Melbourne CBD.

Box Hill will be the northern terminus of stage one of the Suburban Rail Loop project. Construction began in 2022, with the project scheduled for completion by 2032. It will connect Box Hill to the Frankston, Pakenham, Cranbourne and Glen Waverley lines, as well as other new intermediate stations.

== Platforms and services ==
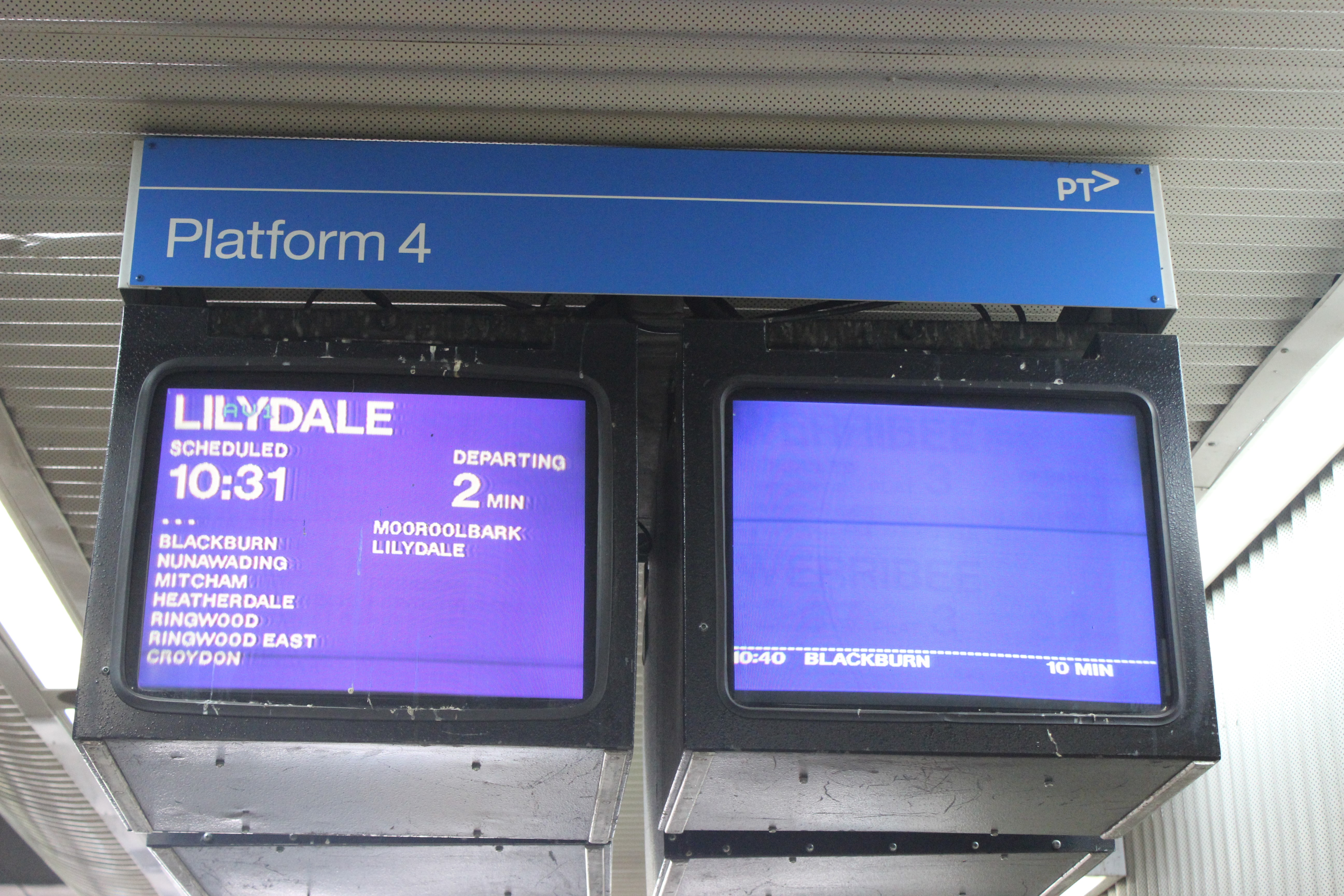
The now replaced CRT Monitor on Platform 4 displaying a Lilydale service, one year prior to being replaced, December 2017

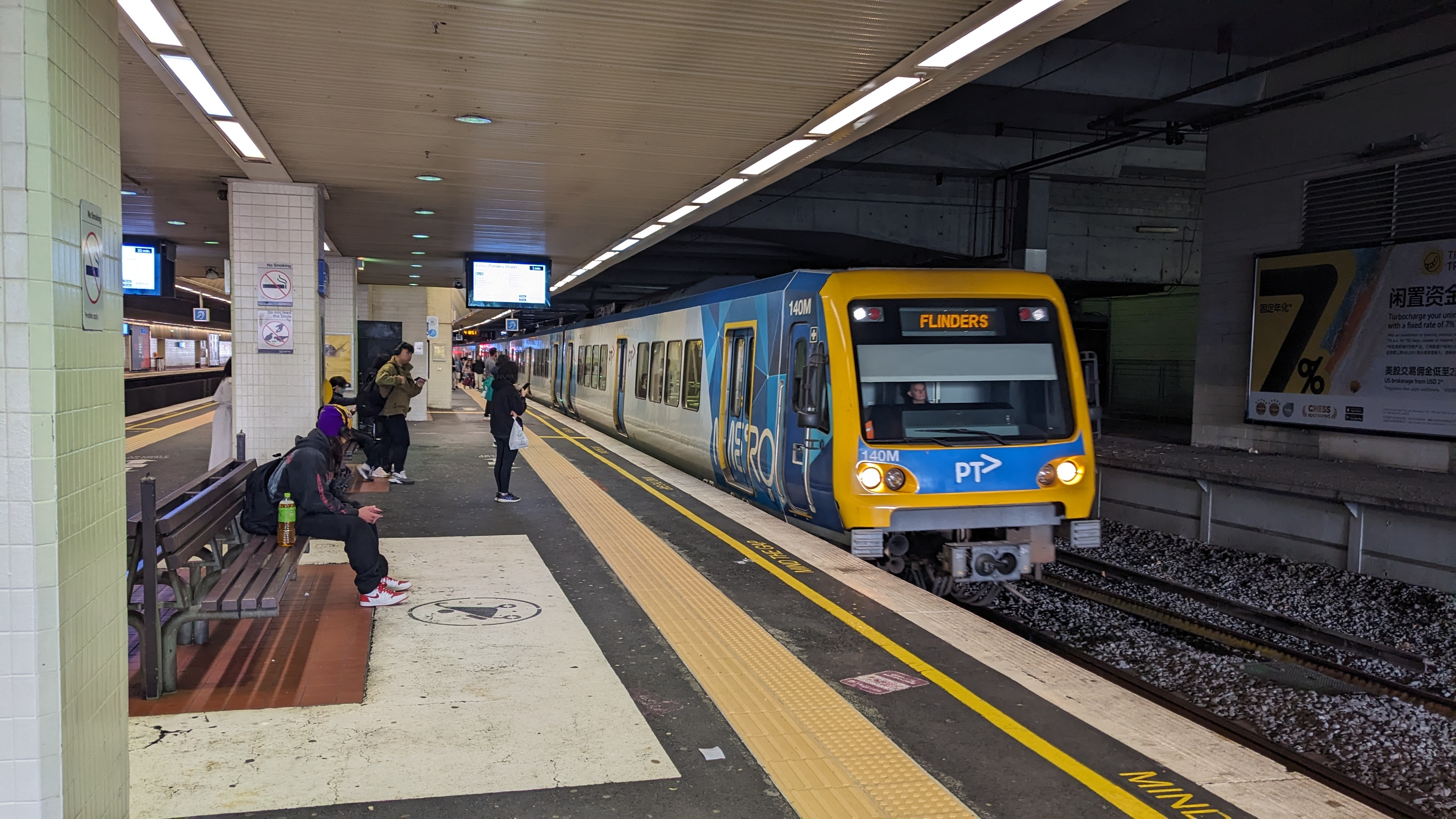
An X'Trapolis train on a Flinders Street-bound service arrives at Platform 2, August 2024

Box Hill has one island platform with two faces and two side platforms, but Platform 1 is not in use. The station is served by Lilydale and Belgrave line trains.

Box Hill platform arrangement
Box Hill Central shopping centre
Platform	Line	Destination	Via	Service Type	Notes	Source
2	Belgrave line Lilydale line	Flinders Street	City Loop	All stations and limited express services	See City Loop for operating patterns.	
3	Belgrave line Lilydale line	Flinders Street	City Loop	All stations and limited express services	See City Loop for operating patterns.	
3	Belgrave line Lilydale line	Lilydale or Belgrave		All stations		
4	Belgrave line Lilydale line	Blackburn, Ringwood, Lilydale or Belgrave		All stations	Weekdays only.	

== Transport links ==
=== Bus services ===
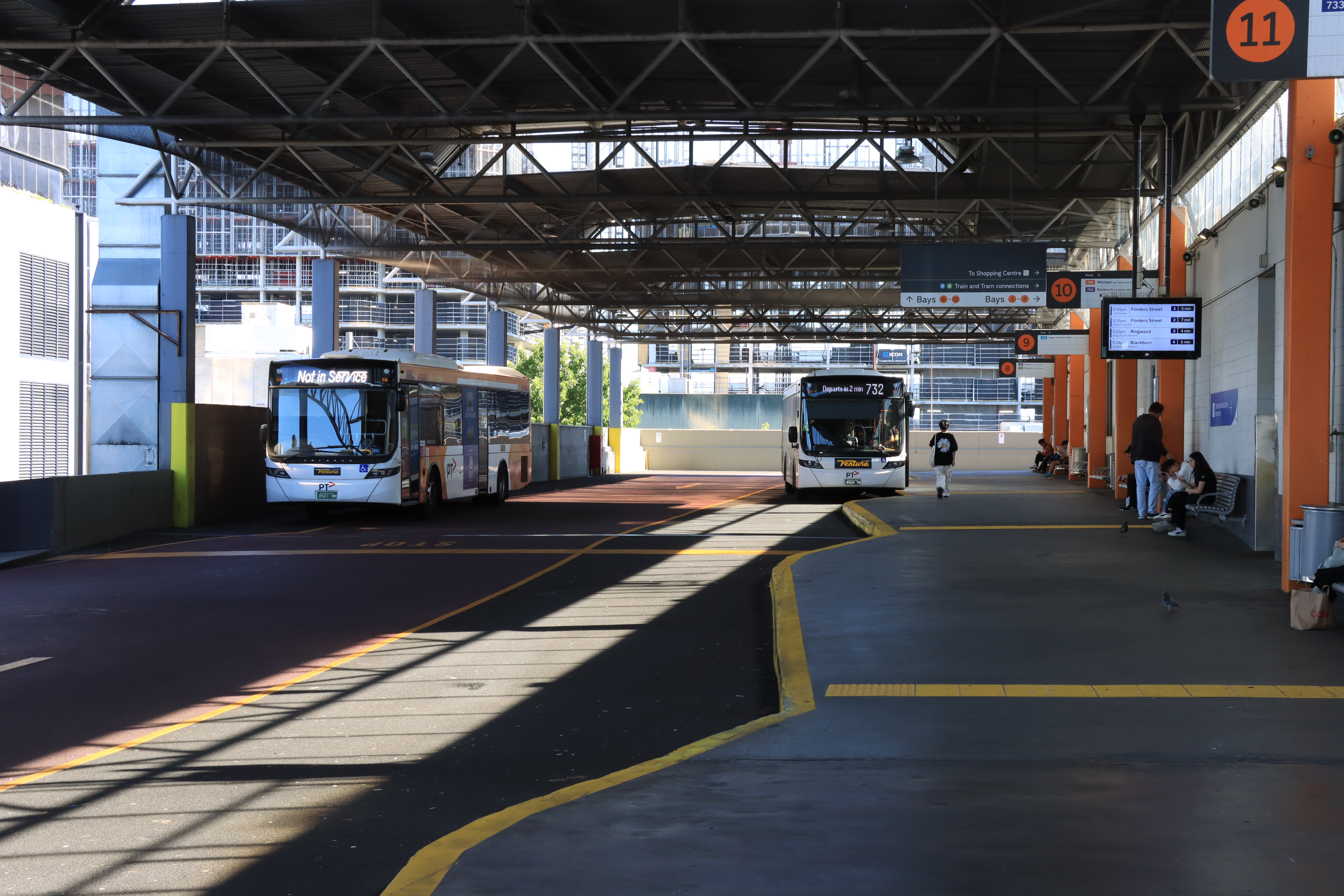
Ventura buses at the bus interchange in December 2024

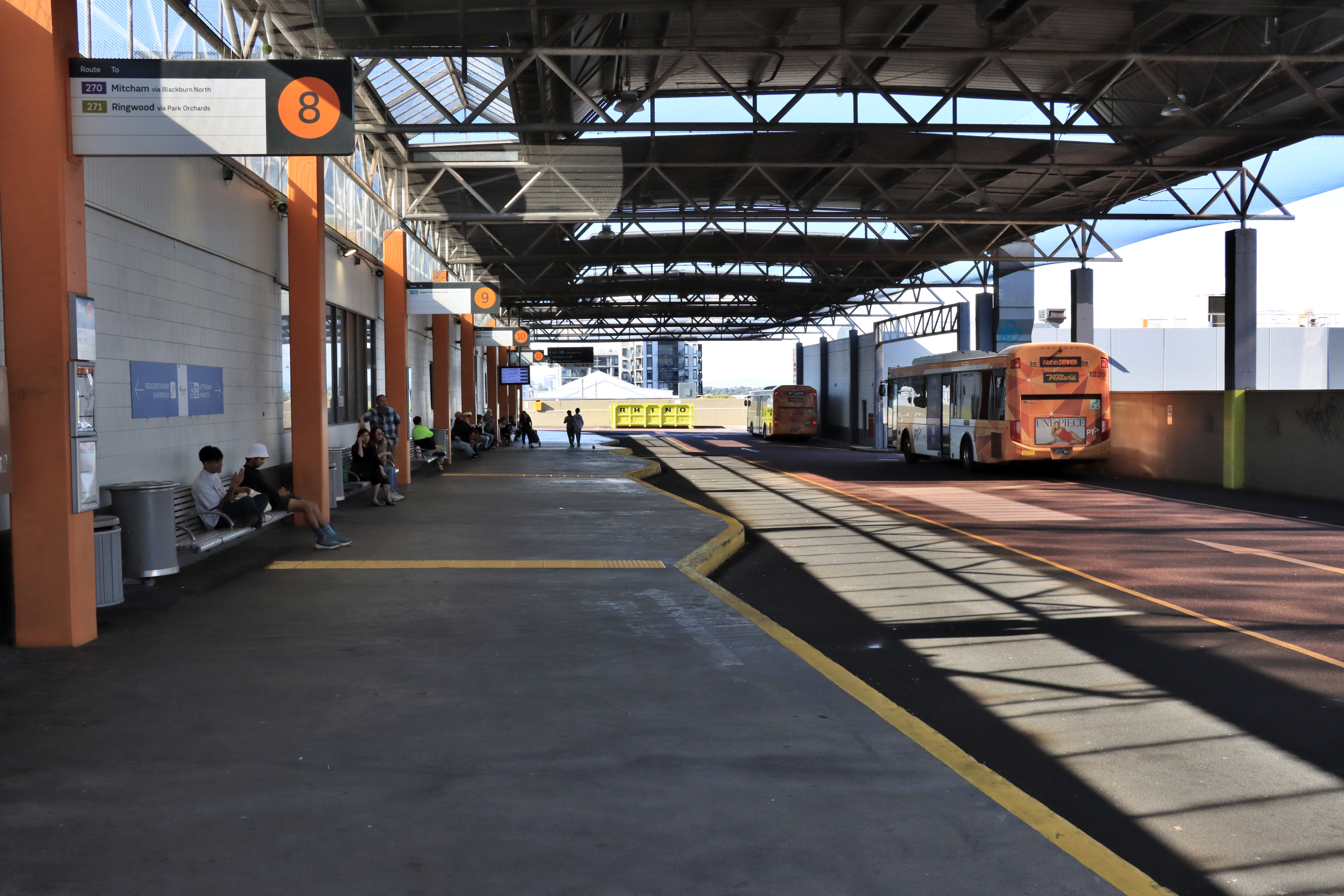
Eastern side of the bus interchange in December 2024

A sheltered thirteen-bay bus terminus is located on the rooftop of the Box Hill Central Shopping Centre, two levels above the station. The terminus serves 20 bus routes operated by CDC Melbourne, Kinetic Melbourne and Ventura Bus Lines. The bus deck originally had 14 bus bays, but bay 12 was removed around 2015 to enable safer access to the lift in the office suites. In 2018, the position of bays 2 and 3 were swapped so that passengers queuing to board SmartBus route 903 southbound would not be in the way of the food kiosk. SkyBus also operates a service to Melbourne Airport.

Bus routes serving Box Hill station:

Bay	Route	To	Via	Ref
1	SmartBus 903	Altona station	Westfield Doncaster, Heidelberg station, Northland Shopping Centre, Preston station, Coburg station, Essendon station and Sunshine station	
2	735	Nunawading station	Station Street, Eley Road and Fulton Road	
3	SmartBus 903	Mordialloc	Deakin University, Chadstone Shopping Centre, Oakleigh station and Mentone station	
4	302	Melbourne CBD (Lonsdale Street)	Belmore Road and Eastern Freeway	
4	SkyBus	Melbourne Airport	Metropolitan Ring Road	
5	281	Templestowe	Westfield Doncaster	
5	293	Greensborough station	Westfield Doncaster	
6	279	Westfield Doncaster/ Templestowe	Middleborough Road	
6	284	Doncaster Park & Ride	Union Road	
7	612	Chadstone Shopping Centre	Union station, Camberwell station and Glen Iris station	
8	270	Mitcham station	Blackburn North	
8	271	Ringwood station	Park Orchards	
9	732	Upper Ferntree Gully station	Vermont South, Westfield Knox and Mountain Gate Shopping Centre	
10	765	Mitcham station	Blackburn station, Forest Hill Chase and Brentford Square	
10	766	Burwood	Union station	
11	733	Oakleigh station	Mount Waverley station, Monash University Clayton Campus and Clayton station	
12	767	Westfield Southland	Deakin University and Chadstone Shopping Centre	
13	201	Deakin University; Burwood Campus	Station Street and Elgar Road	

=== Tram services ===
Yarra Trams operates one route via Box Hill station:

- : Box Hill – Port Melbourne

=== V/Line coach services ===
A V/Line coach stop is located at Whitehorse Road near Watts Street, with services to:

- Mansfield, Victoria (with connection to Mount Buller during snow season)

== Usage ==
Passenger usage at Box Hill Station between 2008 and 2024 sorted by financial year.

Box Hill is the tenth-busiest station on Melbourne's metropolitan rail network.

== Gallery ==
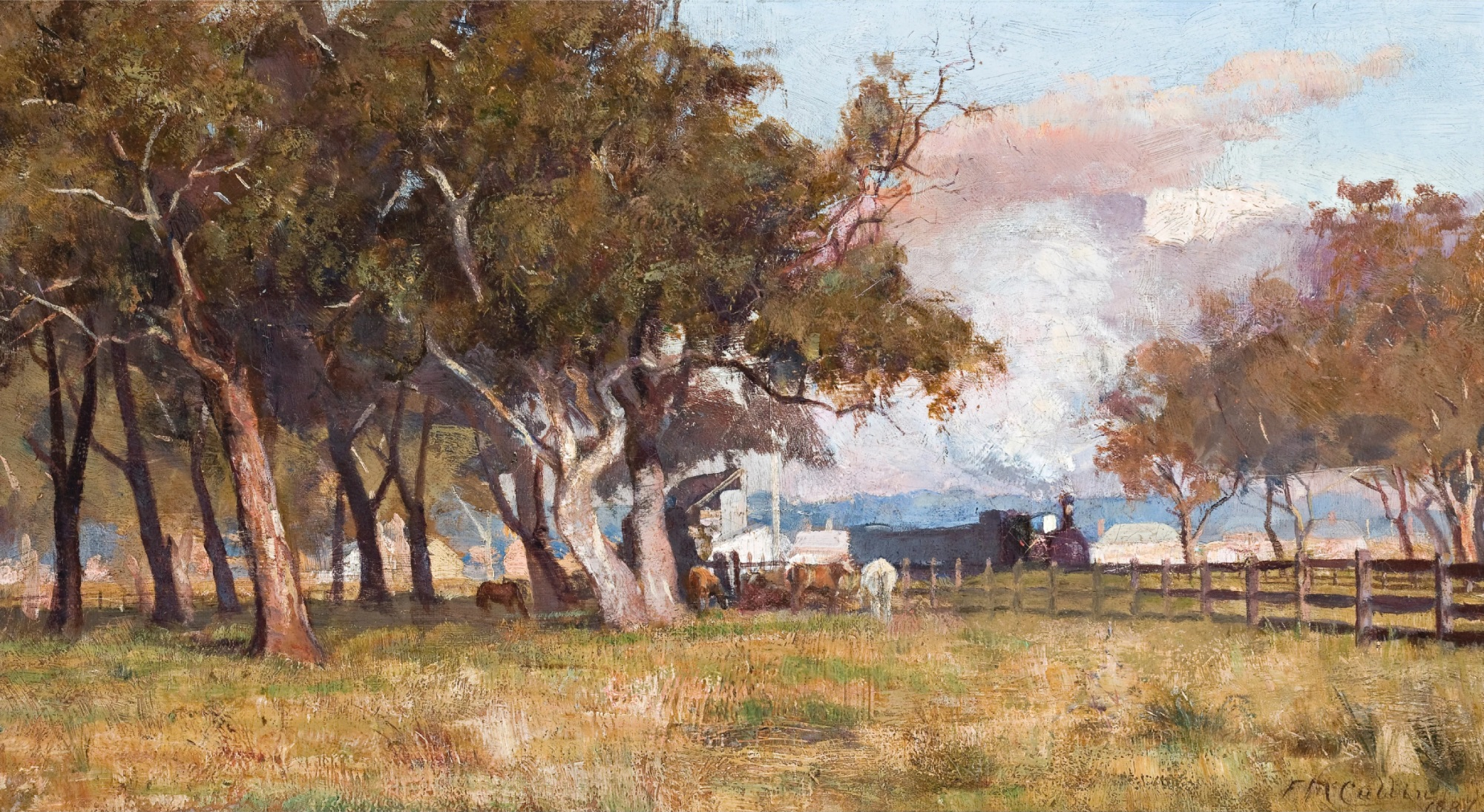
Frederick McCubbin's 1887 painting, Morning Train, shows a train leaving Box Hill station

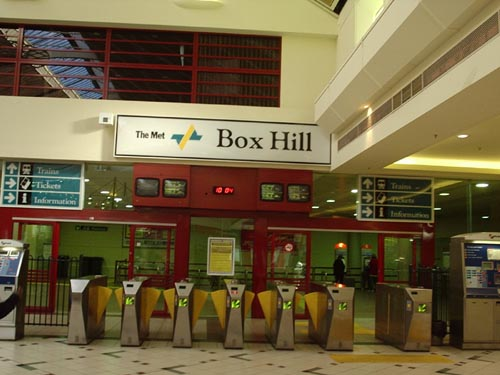
Entrance from Box Hill Central in July 2004

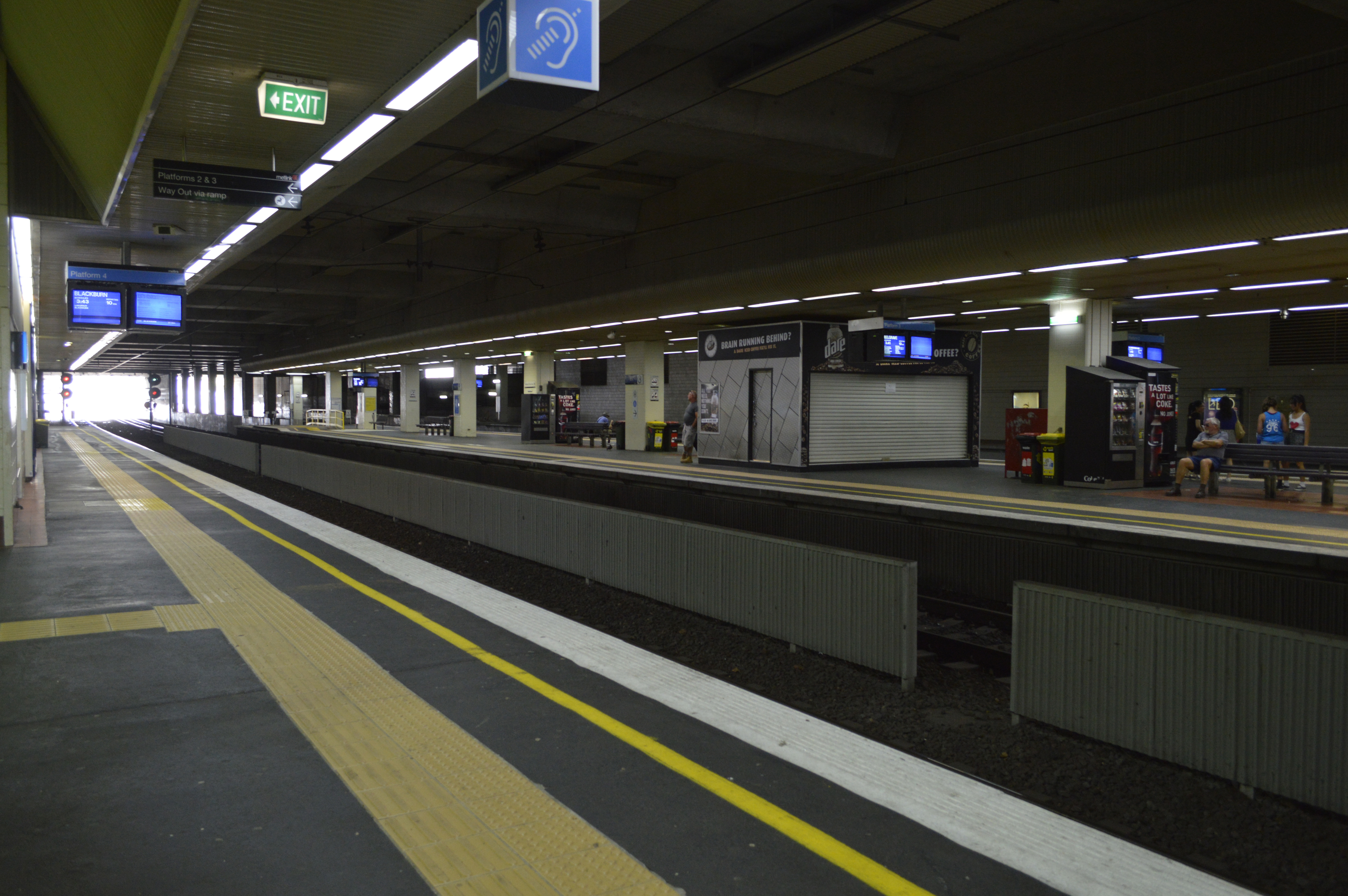
Eastbound view from Platform 4, January 2013

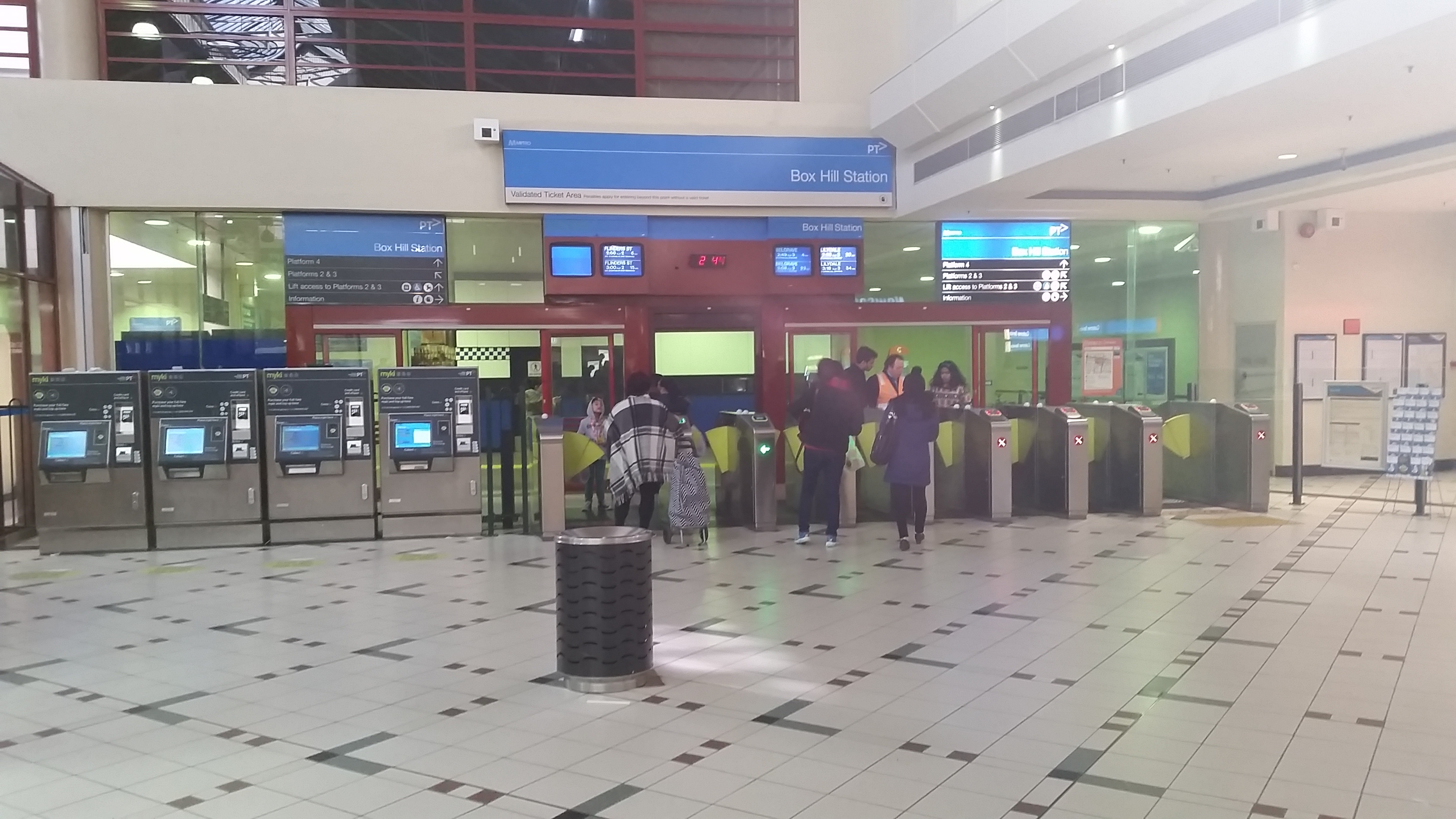
Entrance from Box Hill Central Shopping Centre, July 2016

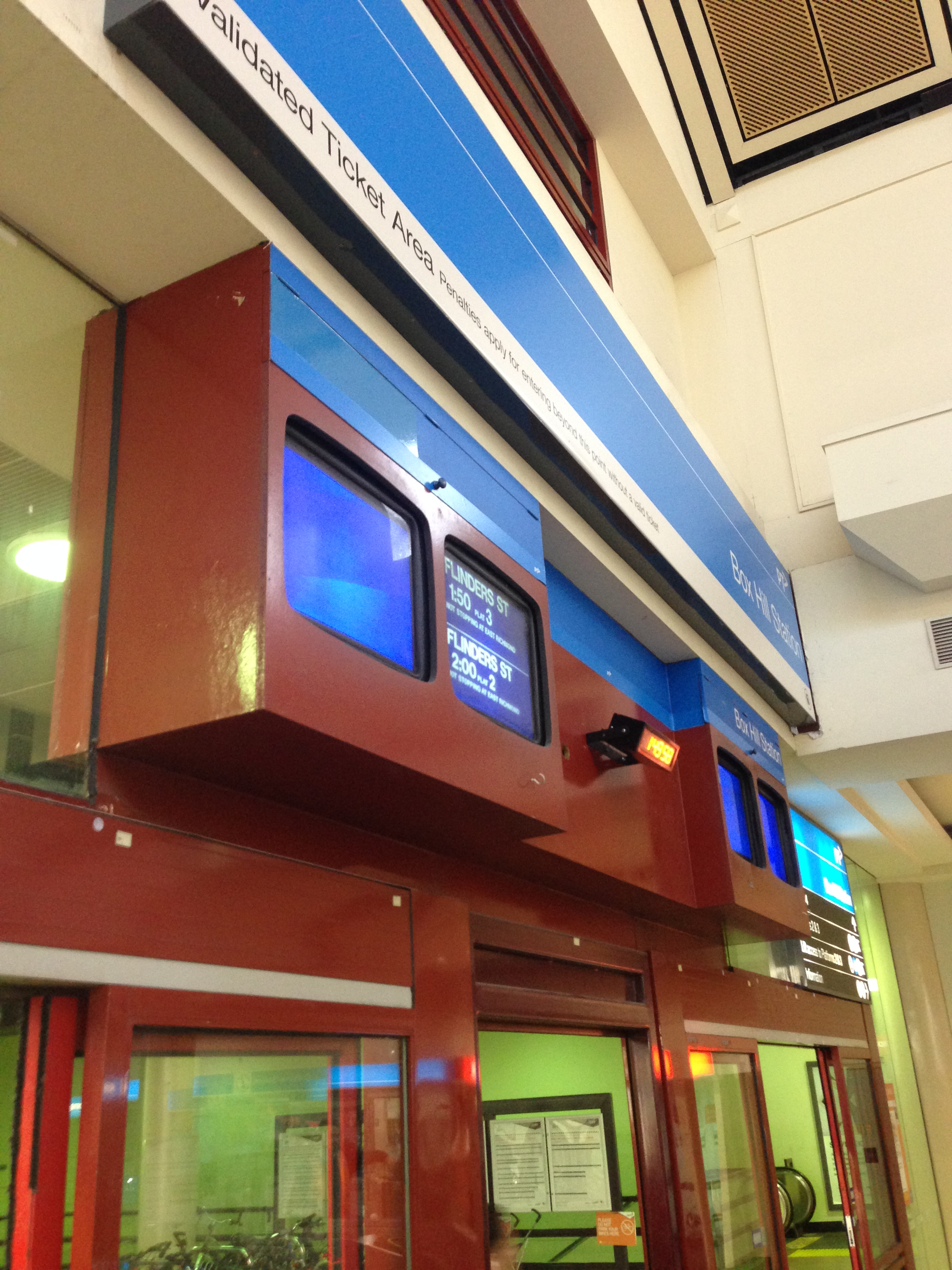
The now replaced CRT Monitor screens at the station entrance, one year prior to being replaced, January 2017

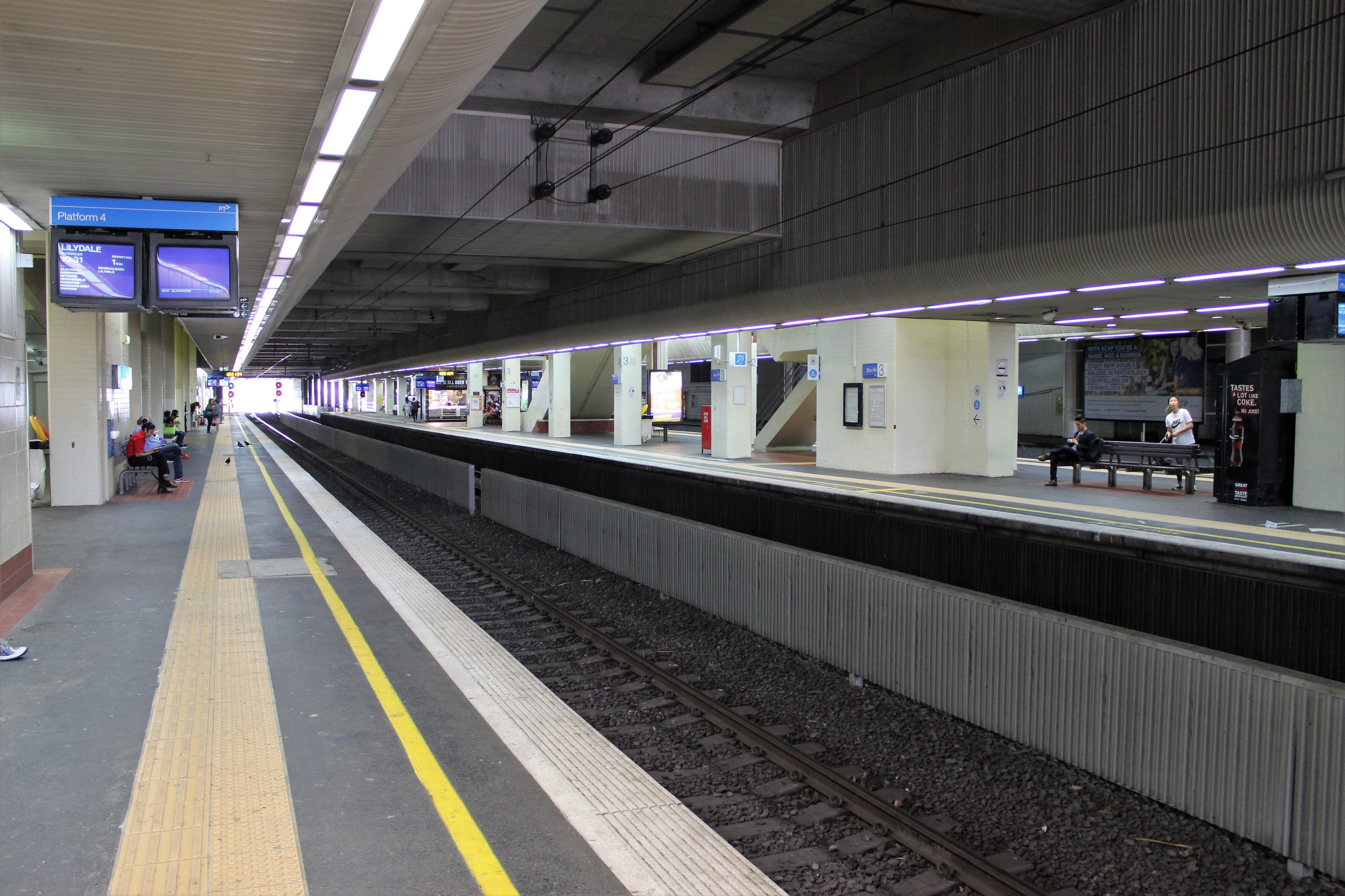
Eastbound view from Platform 4, December 2017

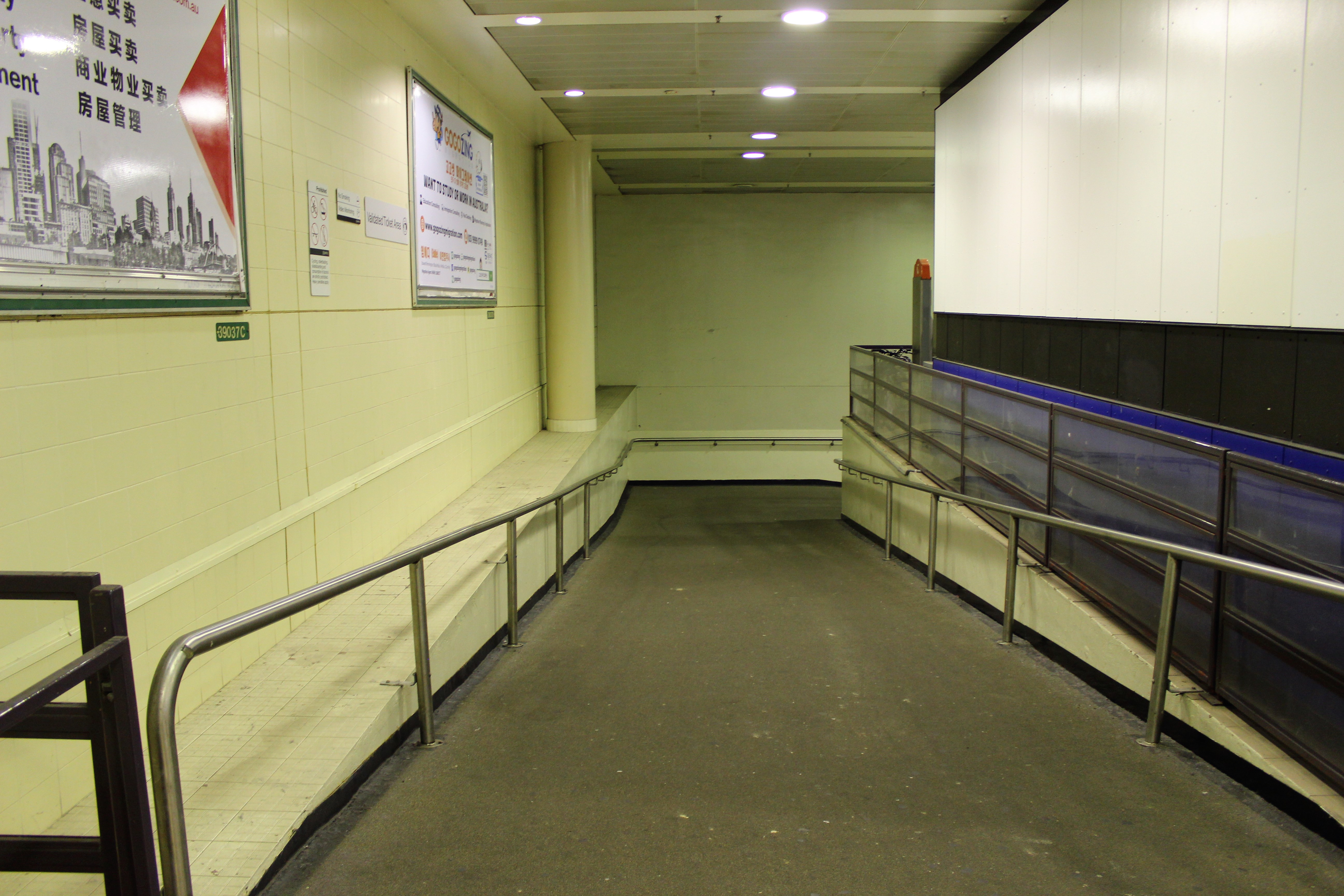
The station ramp to Platform 4, December 2017

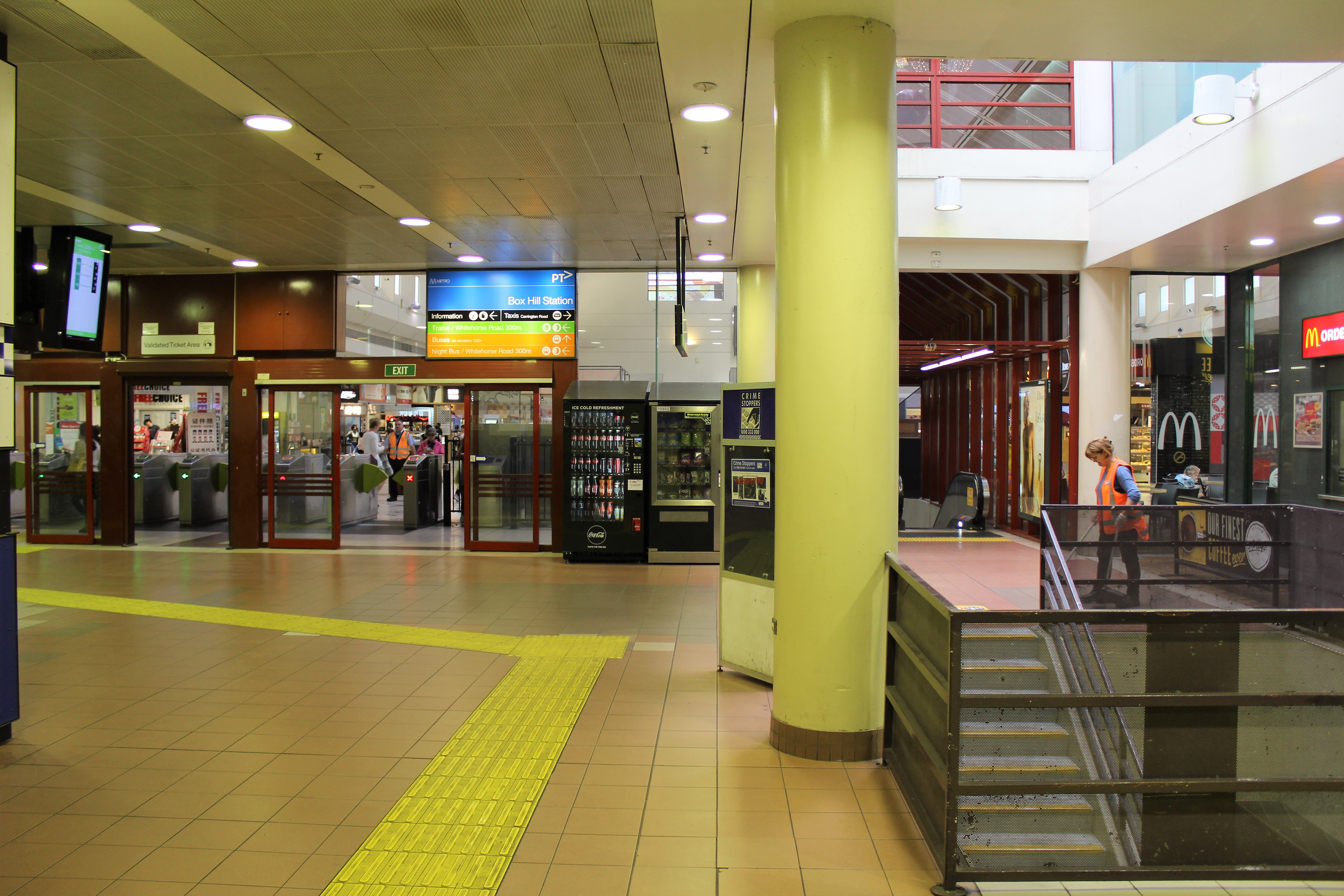
Box Hill Central and station concourse,
December 2017

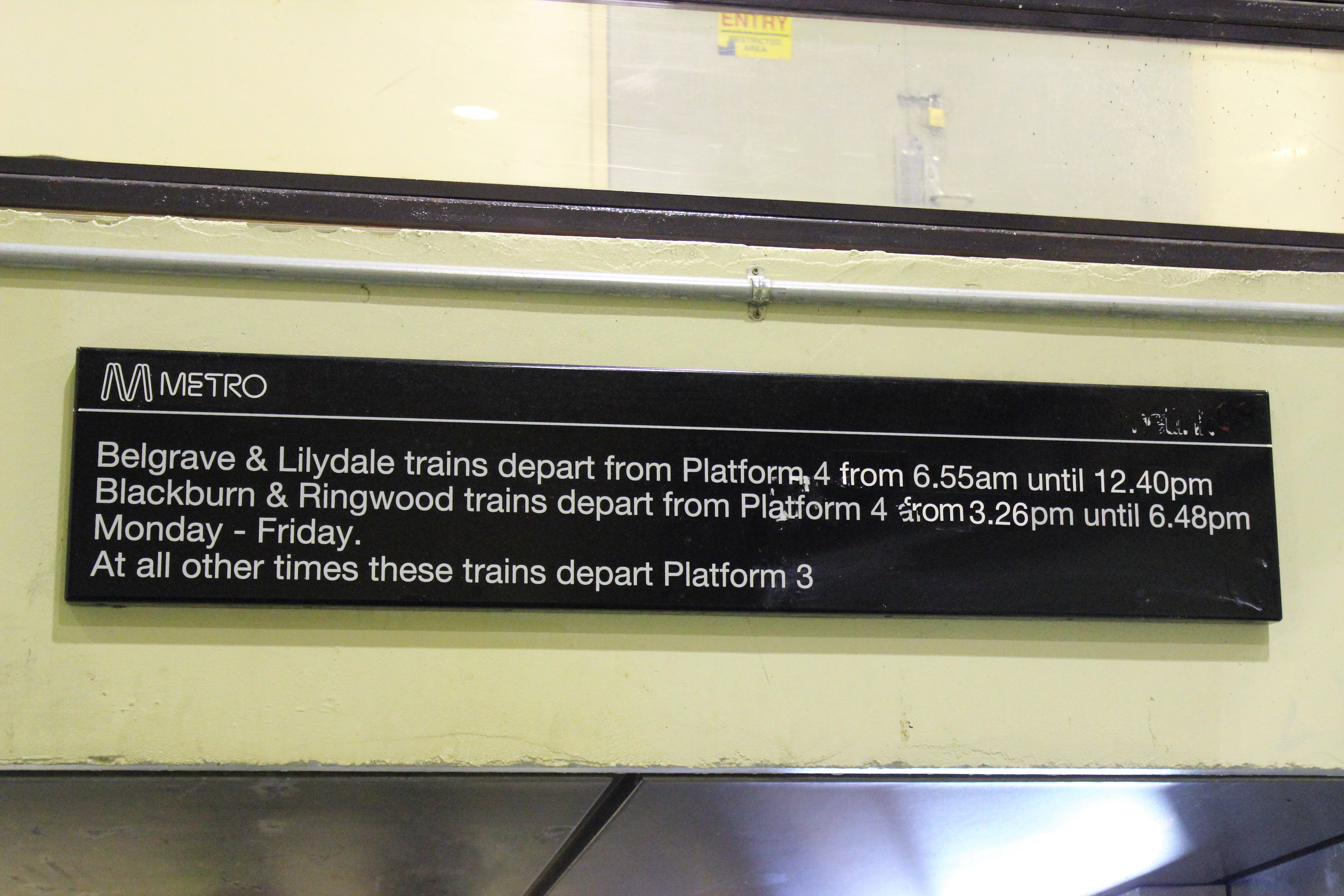
The train arrivals and departures signage at the station, December 2017

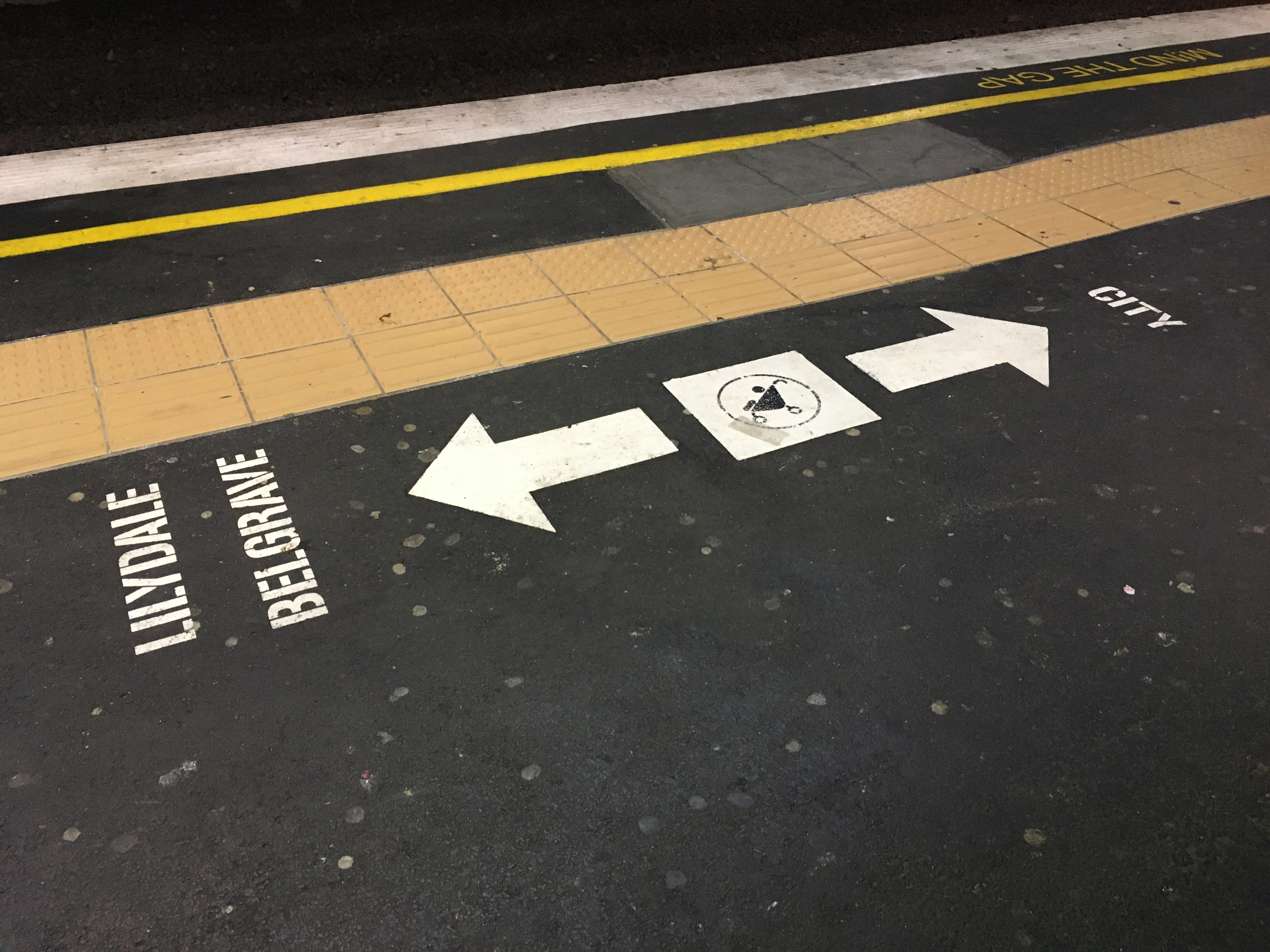
The Platform markings at Box Hill station indicating directions of travel, July 2020

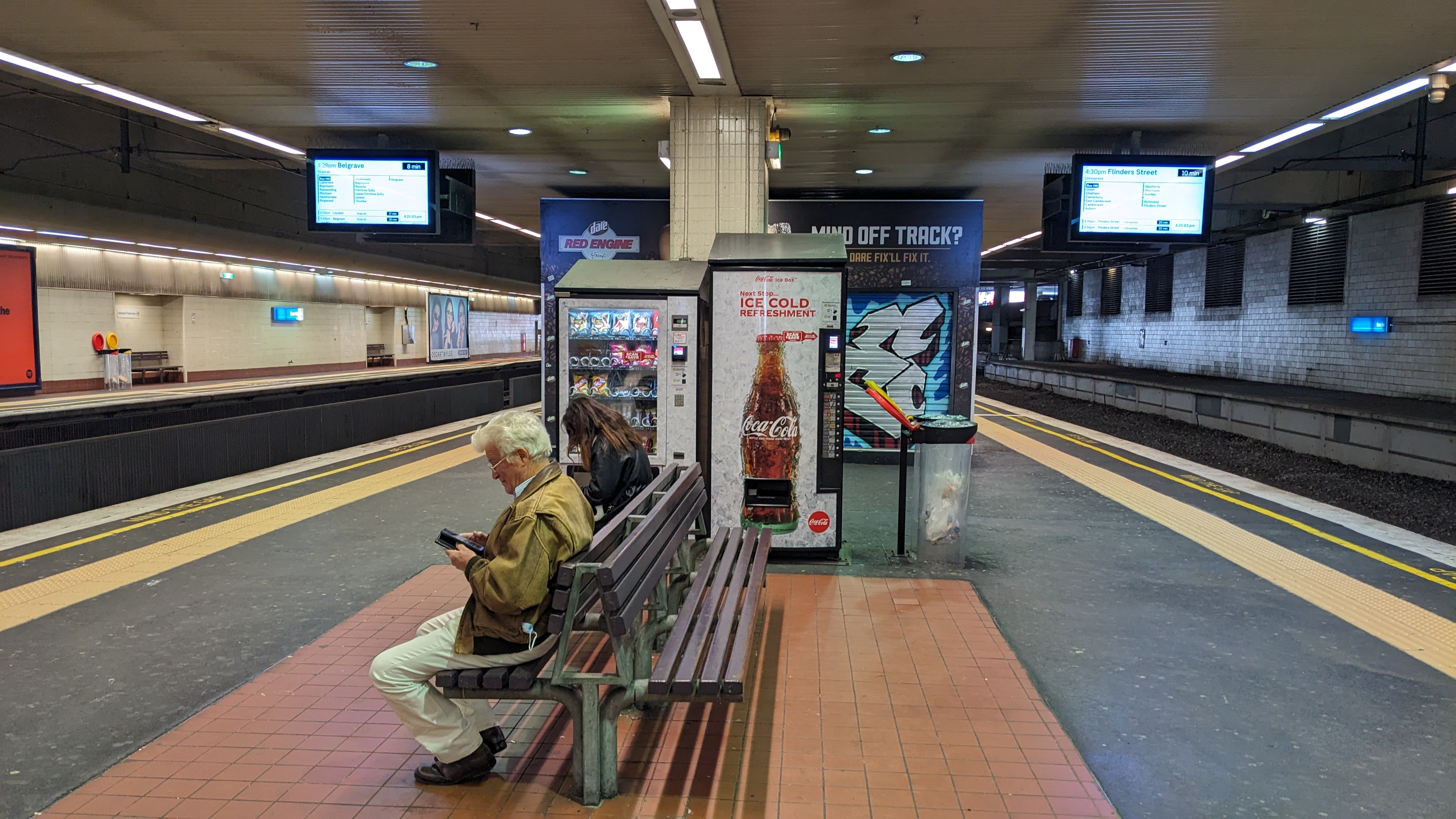
Eastbound view from Platforms 2 and 3, August 2024

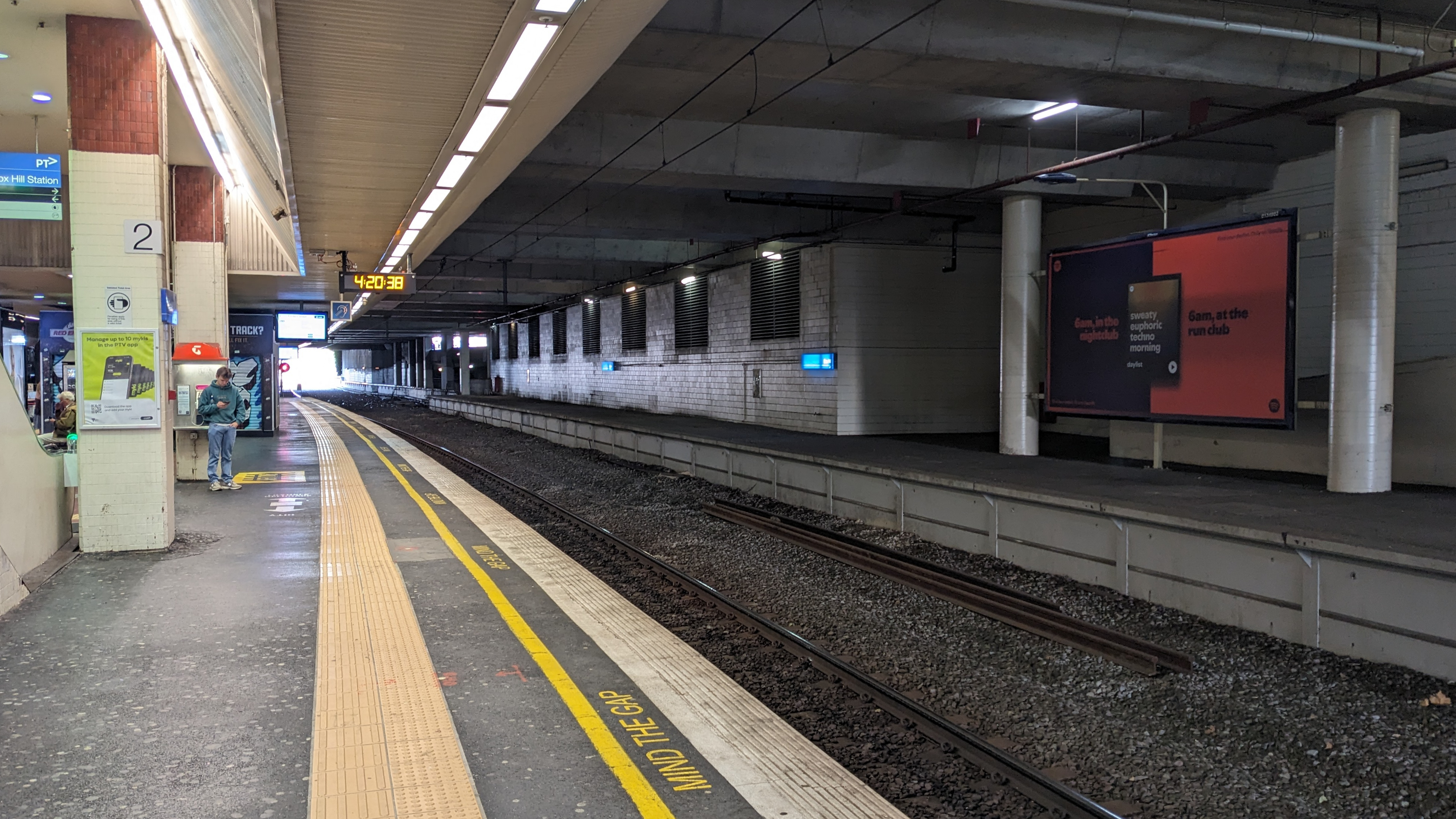
Eastbound view from Platform 2, August 2024

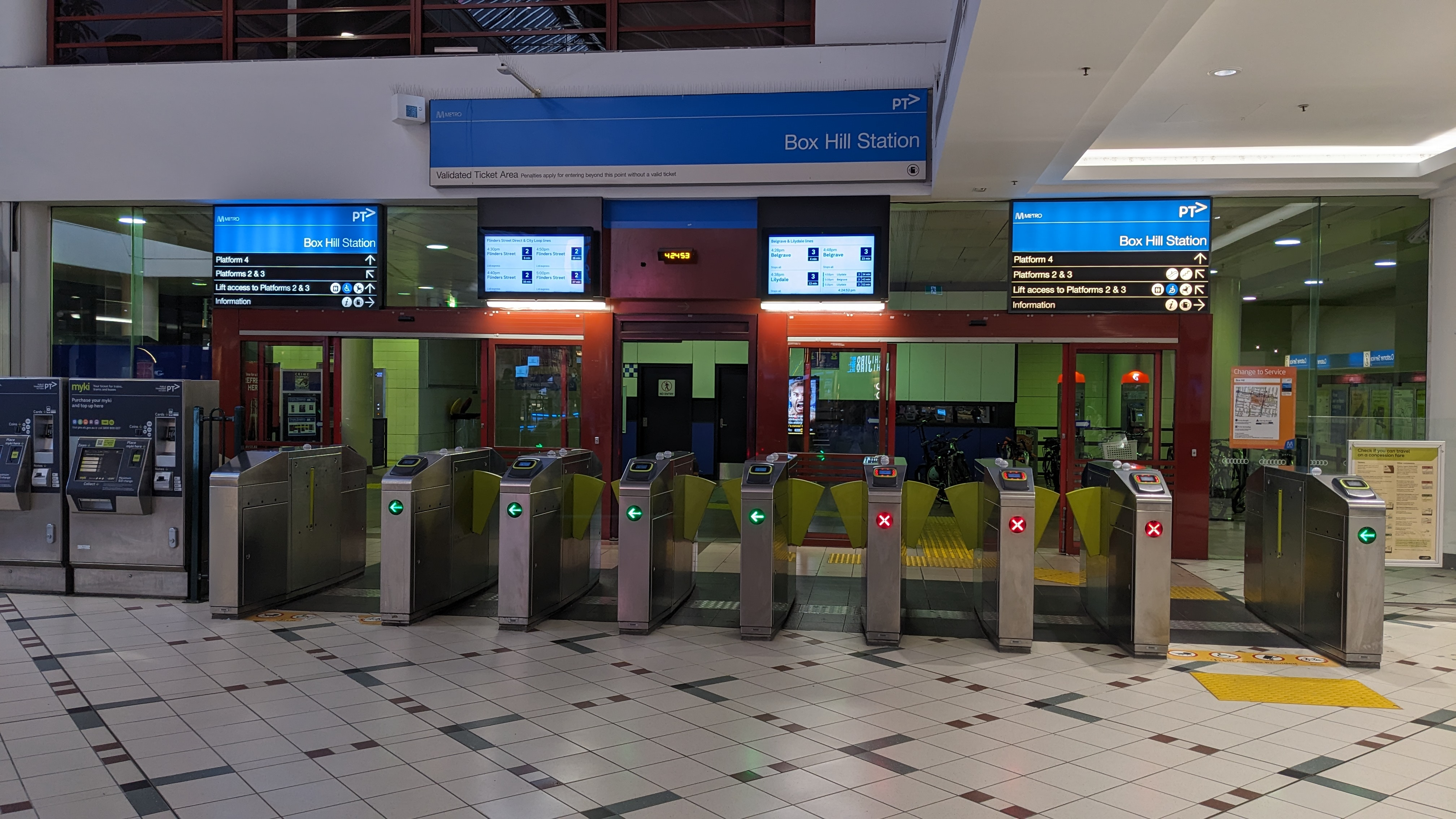
The Myki gates and main entrance and PIDS to platforms, August 2024

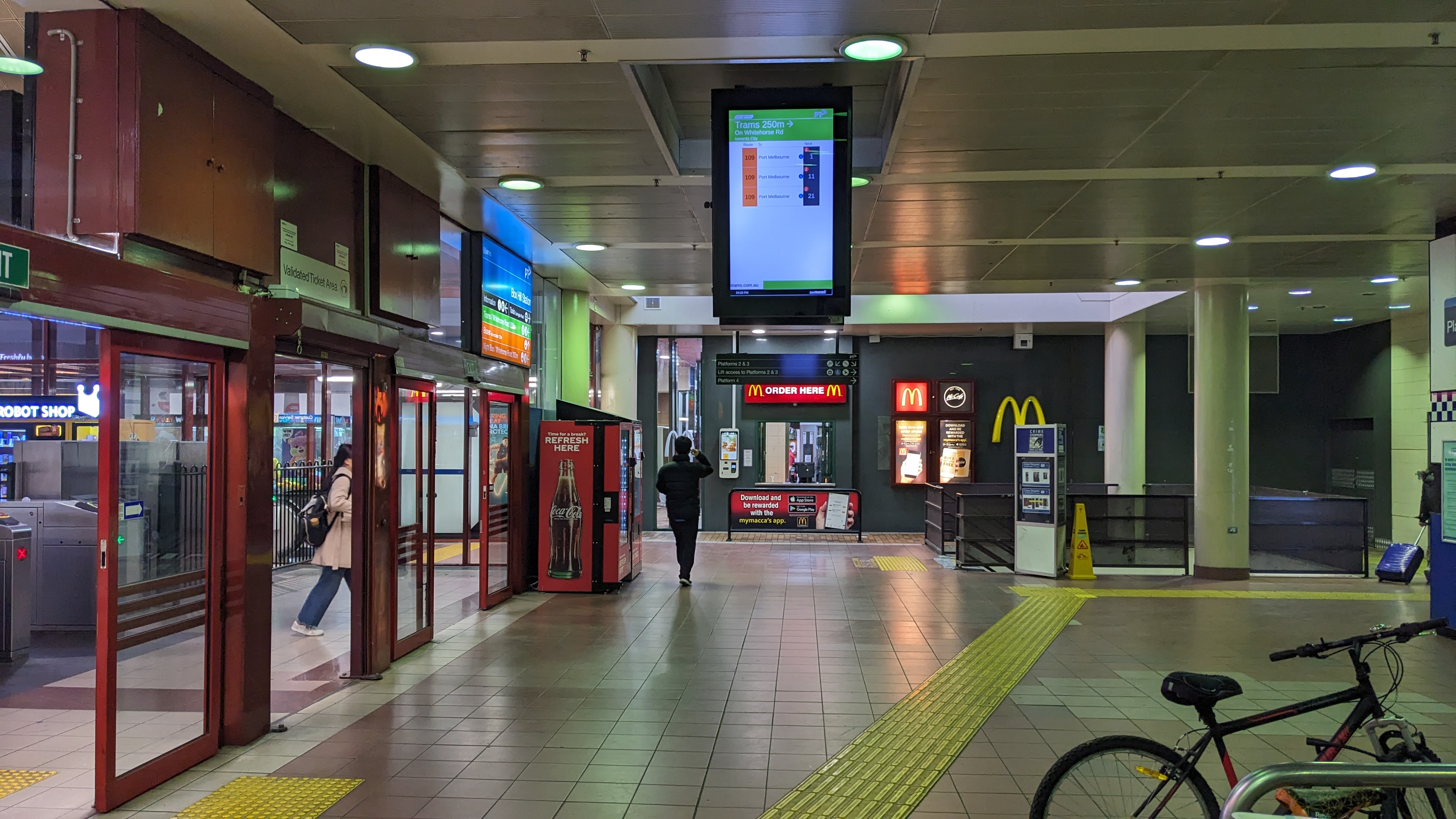
The main concourse from Box Hill Shopping Centre to Box Hill station, August 2024

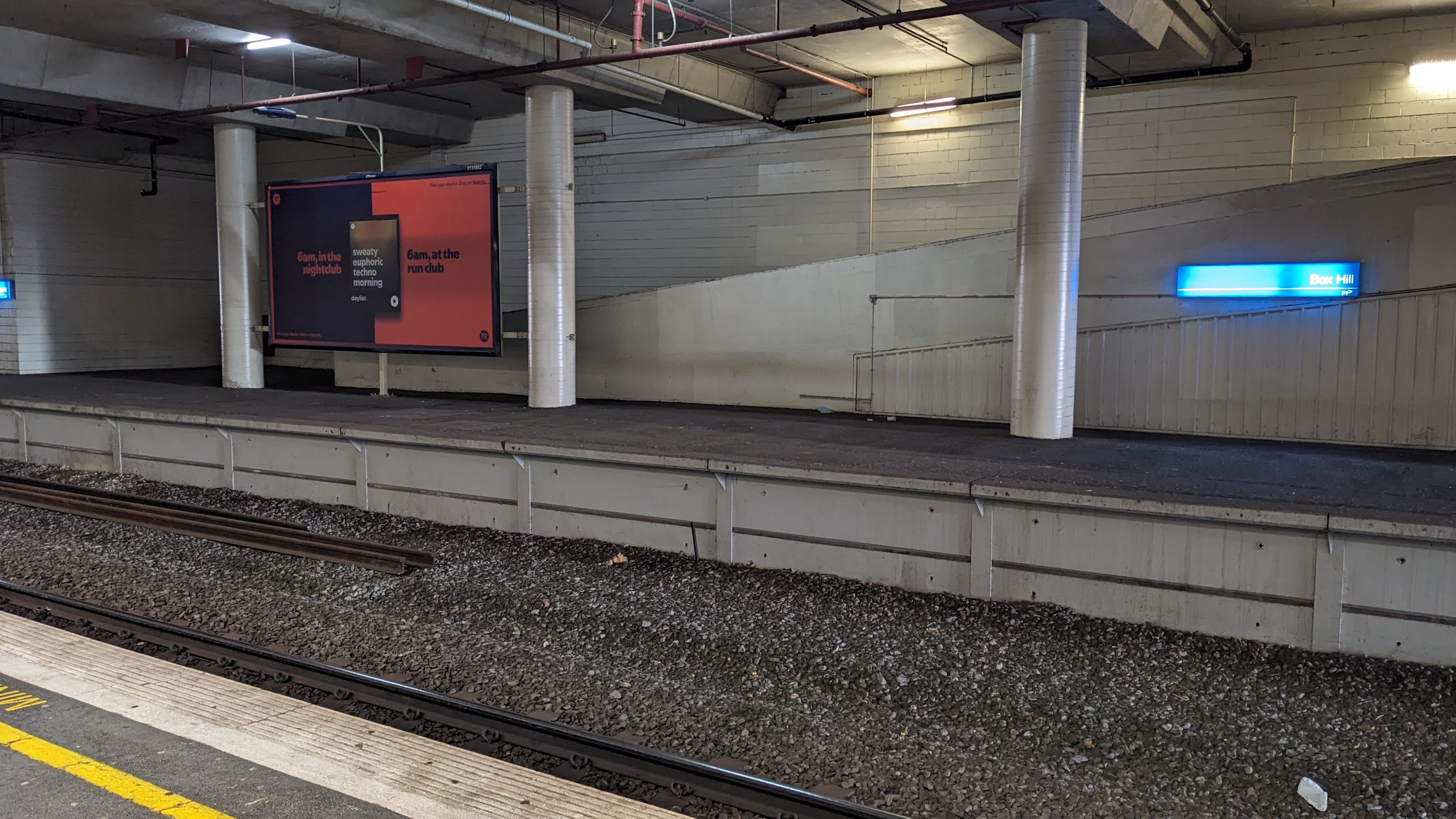
The disused Platform 1 with railway tracks removed, August 2024

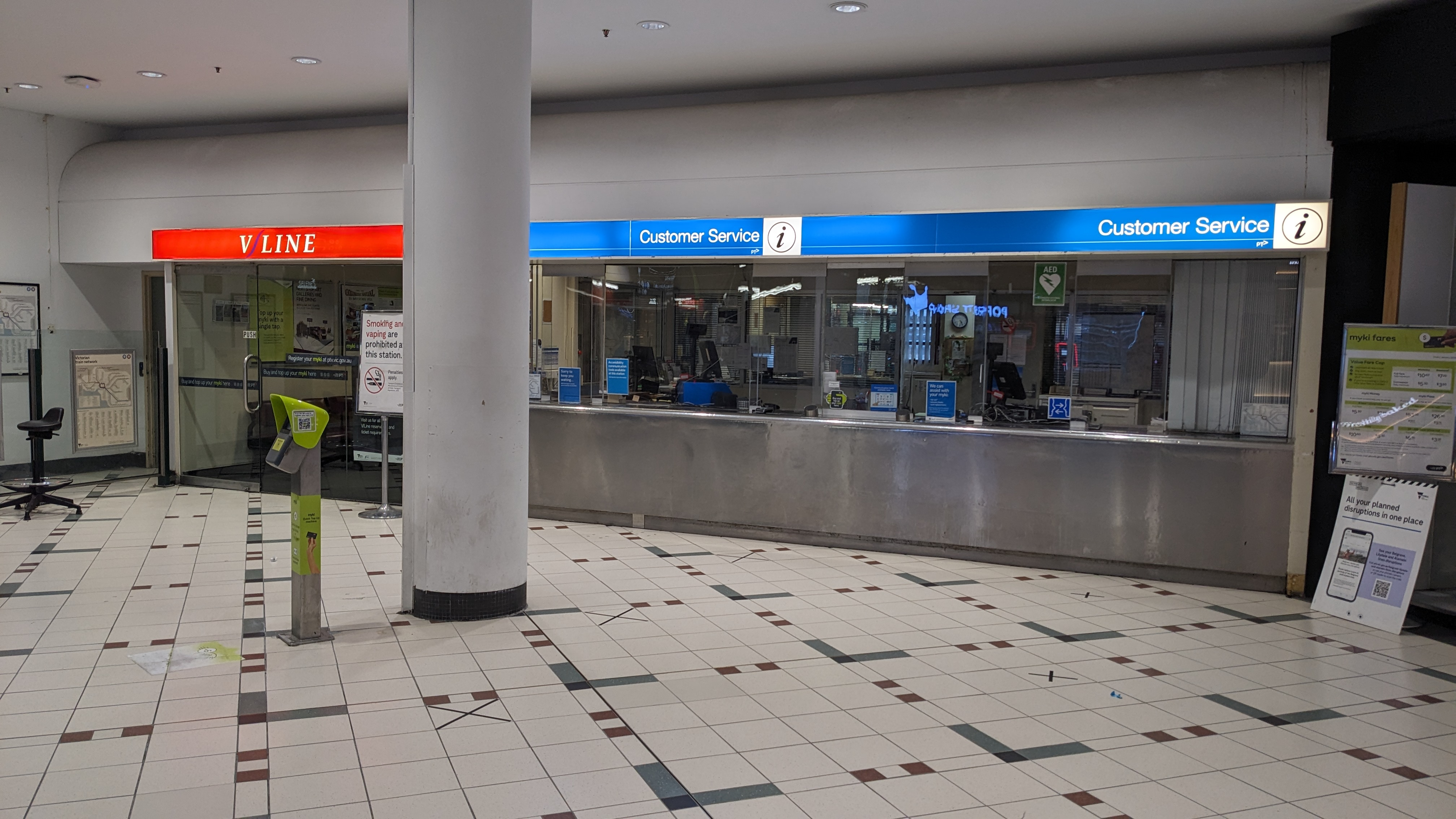
The V/Line and Metro customer services, August 2024

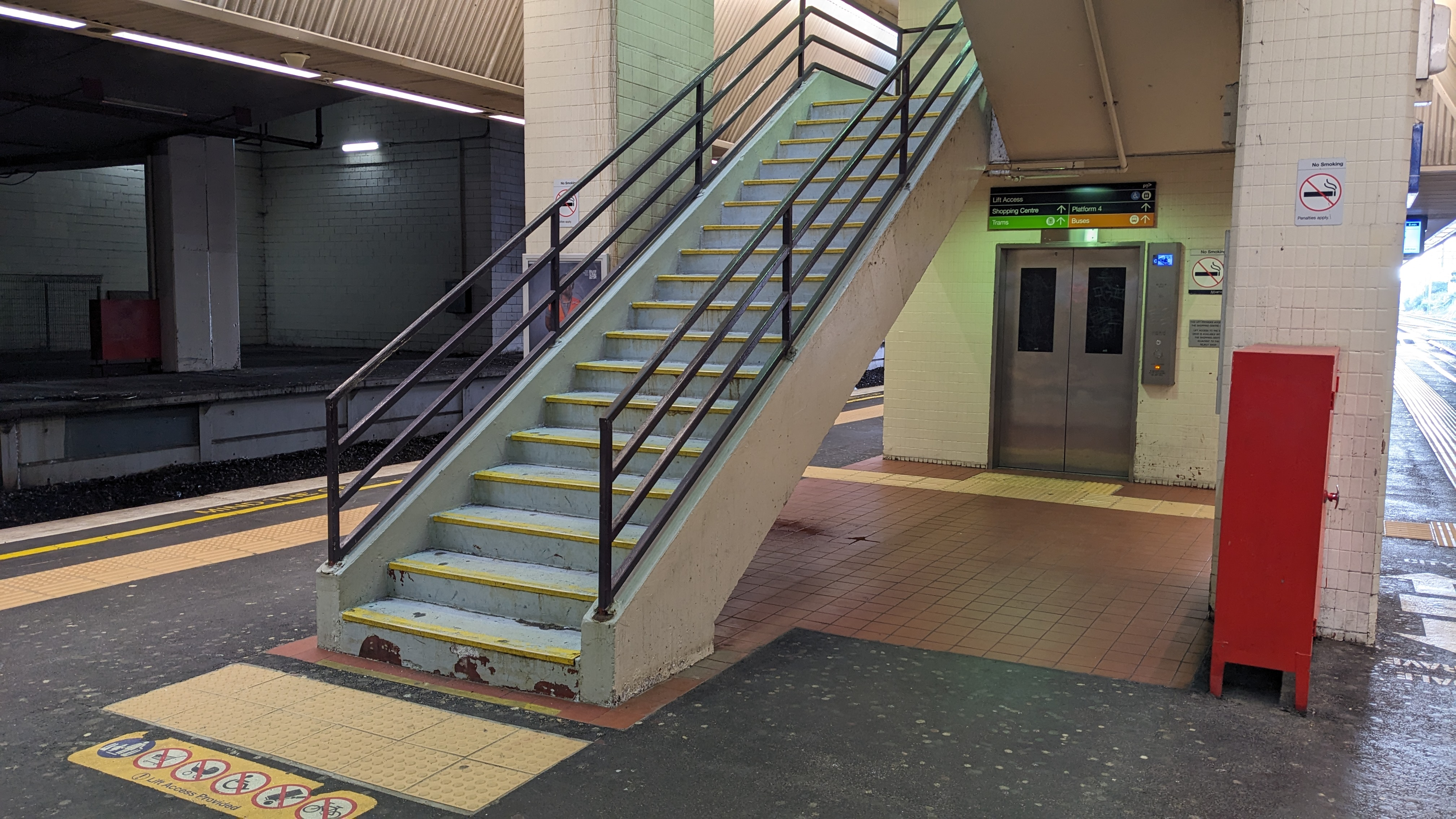
Stairs and lift at platform level from Platforms 2 and 3, August 2024

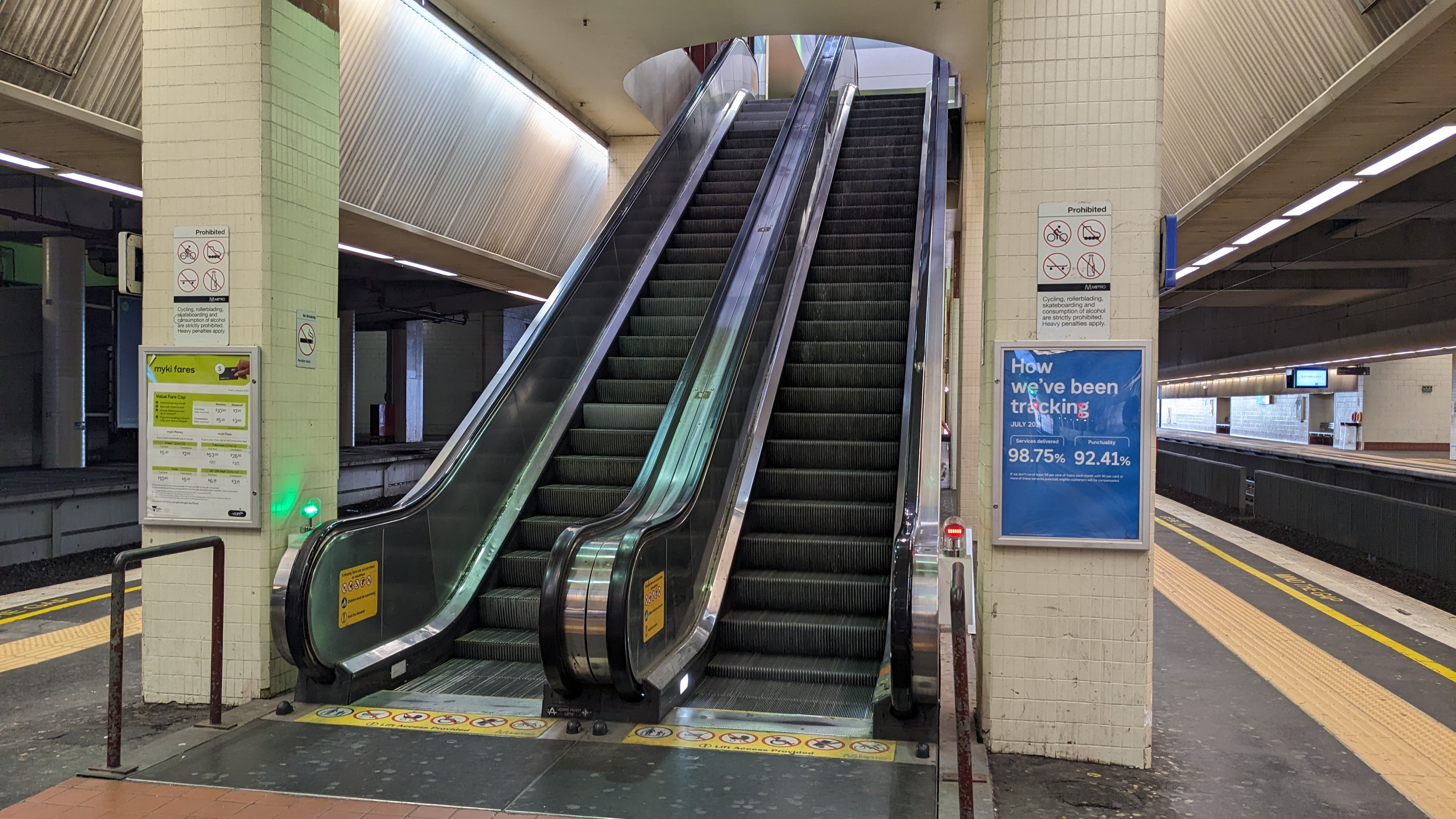
Escalators to concourse from platform level, August 2024
