= Laburnum, Victoria =

Coordinates: 37°49′05″S 145°08′38″E

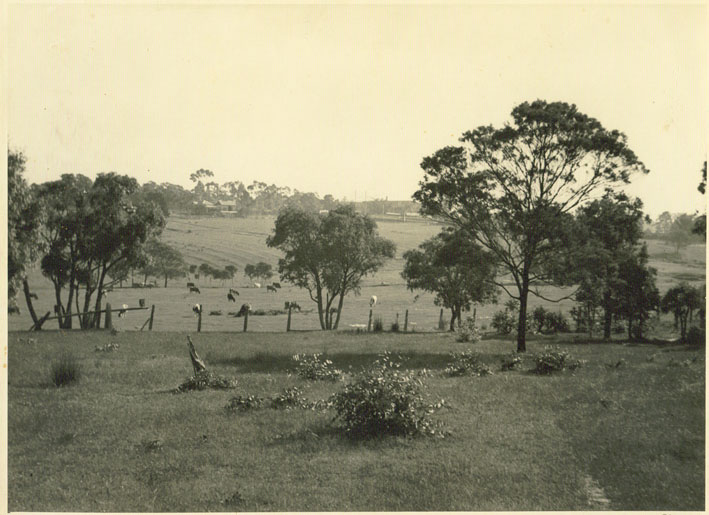
1939 view from Myrtle Grove towards Box Hill High School

Laburnum refers to a small area in the 'Bellbird' area of the suburb of Blackburn, Victoria, Australia. It covers the area bordered by Middleborough and Blackburn Roads, Gardiners Creek and the Belgrave/Lilydale railway line. It is a heavily treed area noted for its Laburnum bushes. It is in the local government area of the City of Whitehorse in Melbourne's eastern suburbs.

The area is covered by strict planning controls. This has limited development and meant it has been able to retain a village feel, despite only being a short train ride from downtown Melbourne. It has a railway station, primary school, and post office, despite never being a suburb (technically, it is a "neighbourhood").

The Blackburn Creeklands park is an important community asset of Laburnum providing for both recreation and a wildlife corridor. In 1983, the then Nunawading Council the purchased the middle section of land that integrates and links Blacks Walk, Kalang and Furness Parks into today's long, linear park following Gardiners Creek from Middleborough to Blackburn Roads.
