= Blackburn, Victoria =

Blackburn
- Suburb
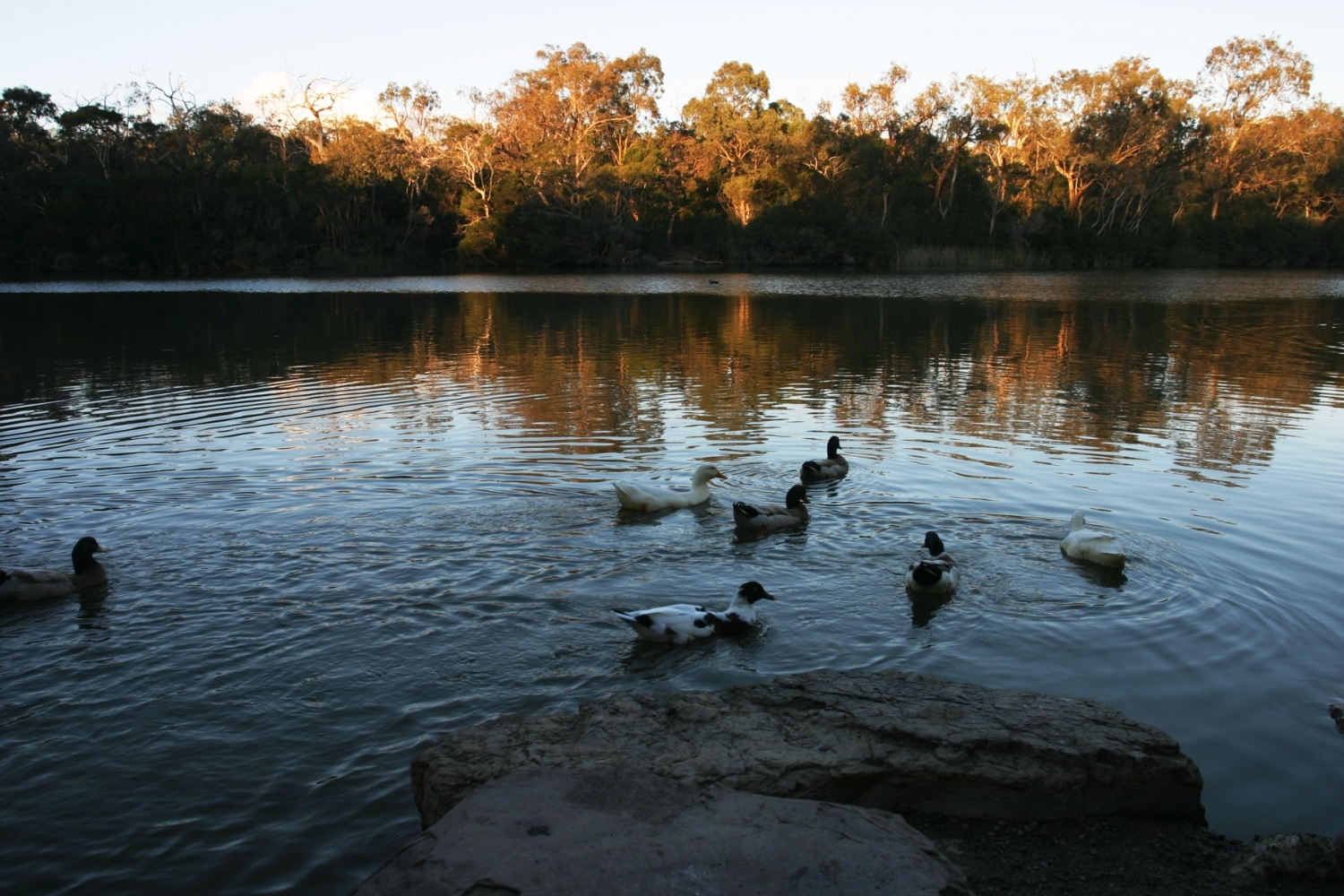
- Blackburn Lake Sanctuary

- Interactive map of Blackburn
- Coordinates: 37.826°S 145.151°E
- Country: Australia
- State: Victoria
- City: Melbourne
- LGA: City of Whitehorse
- Location: 16 km (9.9 mi) from Melbourne

Government
  - State electorates: Box Hill; Ringwood
  - Federal divisions: Deakin; Menzies

Area
  - Total: 5.8 km^{2} (2.2 sq mi)
- Elevation: 98 m (322 ft)

Population
  - Total: 14,478 (2021 census)
  - Density: 2,496/km^{2} (6,470/sq mi)
- Postcode: 3130
Suburbs around Blackburn
Box Hill North	Blackburn North	Nunawading
Box Hill	Blackburn	Nunawading
Box Hill South	Blackburn South	Forest Hill

Blackburn is a suburb of Melbourne, Victoria, Australia, 16 kilometres (9.9 mi) east of Melbourne's Central Business District, located within the City of Whitehorse local government area. Blackburn recorded a population of 14,478 at the 2021 census.

The origin of the name Blackburn is not certain, but may have been after an early settler or James Blackburn, who designed Yan Yean Reservoir.

Blackburn is bounded in the west by Middleborough Road, in the north by Springfield Road, in the east by an irregular line along streets to the east of Blackburn Lake Sanctuary - known as the Bellbird area - and in the south by Canterbury Road.

== History ==
Europeans first settled the area of Blackburn in the 1841s. The area was densely wooded, though orchards and small farms were soon developed. In 1861 the Traveller's Rest Hotel was built on the current site of the Blackburn Hotel. Blackburn Creek Post Office opened on 10 January 1876 and was renamed Blackburn in 1883.

During the land boom of the 1880s, brickworks and quarries were established in the area. Blackburn railway station was built in 1882. Blackburn State School was established in 1889.

Though the area near the railway station was subdivided in the nineteenth century, development was slow and most houses in the suburb were not built until after the Second World War.

A large part of Blackburn is of historical significance, as it was built around the artificial Blackburn Lake in 1889, now known as Blackburn Lake Sanctuary, with the lake in the middle of the sanctuary. This was a popular day trip destination by train in the late nineteenth century. Some Australian artists painted in the bush around the Blackburn and Box Hill areas. Of these, Roberts and McCubbin are the best known. The area is protected by strict planning controls restricting development and has retained a village atmosphere.

=== Heritage listings ===
The following places in Blackburn are listed on the Victorian Heritage Register:

- Stone Pipe Organ, inside The Avenue Uniting Church, at 40-44 Blackburn Road

== Demographics ==
In the 2011 census the population of Blackburn was 12,796, approximately 51.1% female and 48.9% male.

The median/average age of the people in Blackburn is 40 years of age.

70.8% of people living in the suburb of Blackburn were born in Australia. The other top responses for country of birth were 3.6% England, 3.6% China, 2.4% India, 1.4% New Zealand, 1.3% Malaysia, 0.7% Hong Kong, 0.7% Korea, Republic of, 0.6% Germany, 0.6% Italy, 0.6% Sri Lanka, 0.6% Vietnam, 0.5% South Africa, 0.4% Scotland, 0.4% Netherlands.

78.8% of people living in Blackburn speak English only. The other top languages spoken are 4.4% Language spoken at home not stated, 3.9% Mandarin, 2.3% Cantonese, 1.2% Other, 1.0% Punjabi, 1.0% Greek, 0.9% Italian, 0.6% Other, 0.6% Korean.

The religious makeup of Blackburn is 29.3% No religion, 21.3% Catholic, 12.6% Anglican, 9.2% Religious affiliation not stated, 6.1% Uniting Church, 4.0% Baptist, 2.5% Christian, nfd, 2.3% Presbyterian and Reformed, 2.3% Buddhism, 2.0% Eastern Orthodox.

The median individual income is $667 per week and the median household income is $1508 per week.

The median rent in Blackburn is $335 per week and the median mortgage repayment is $2000 per month.

In the 12-month period to January 2020 Blackburn reported a median house price of A$1.03 million for a three bedroom house.

== Facilities ==
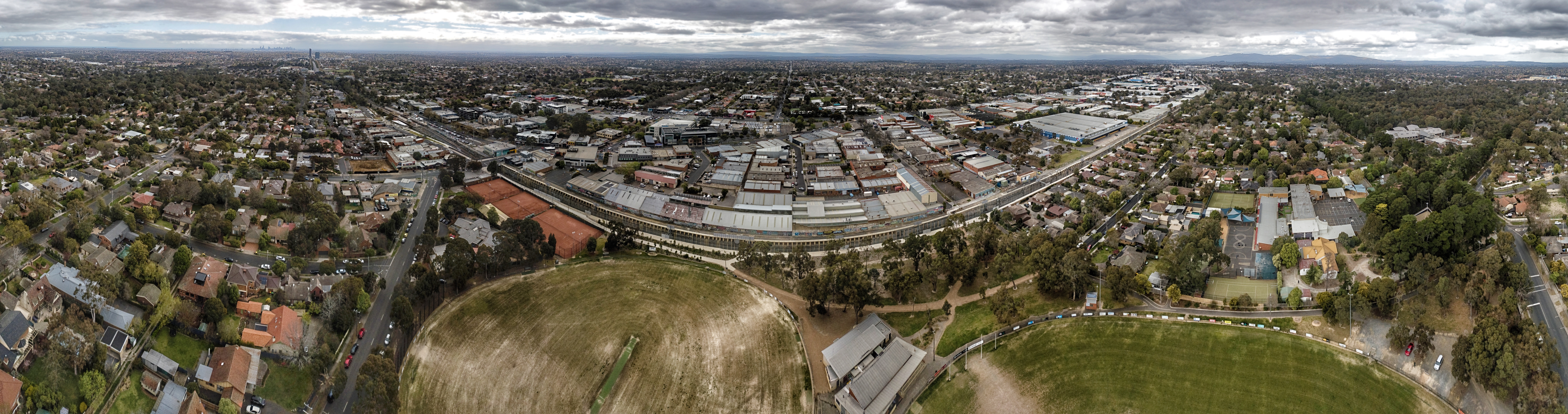
Aerial panorama of Blackburn, Victoria. Shot September 2018.

The major shopping hub of Box Hill is two train stops away, while three buses connect Blackburn to Forest Hill. The 901 Smartbus route also travels via Blackburn, connecting Blackburn with Frankston, Dandenong and Melbourne Airport. It shares its postcode with Blackburn North and Blackburn South. Blackburn Square is north of the railway station in Blackburn North.

Blackburn contains two railway stations, Laburnum and Blackburn, on the Belgrave and Lilydale lines, the former of which services the locality of Laburnum, in the western part of the suburb. Blackburn is also home of the 1st/8th Blackburn Scout Group and The Nerve Centre.

Blackburn enjoys three significant bushland parks: the Blackburn Lake Sanctuary, the Blackburn Creeklands park (comprising Blacks Walk, Kalang Park and Furness Park) which follows Gardiners Creek, and Cootamundra Walk.

== Sport ==
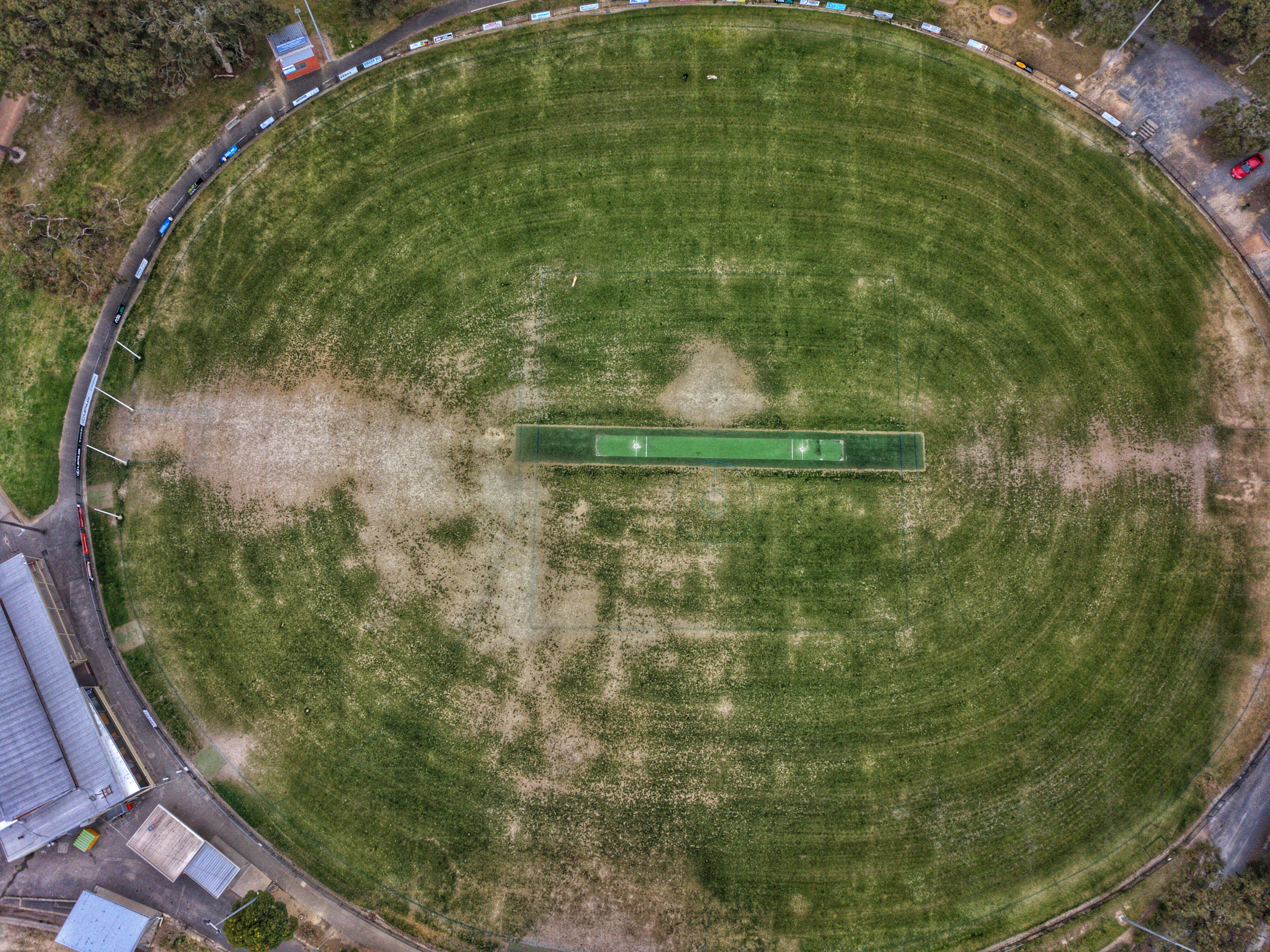
Aerial topdown of the sporting oval at Morton Park, Blackburn

- The suburb has an Australian Rules football team, The Blackburn Panthers' (known as 'The Burners'), competing in the Eastern Football League.
- Cricket: Blackburn Cricket Club, Blackburn North Cricket Club, Blackburn South Cricket Club, Laburnum Cricket Club (formerly Nunawading Churches of Christ Cricket Club)
- Soccer: Blackburn Soccer Club, Blackburn North Baptist Soccer Club
- Netball (Juniors): Blackburn South Netball Club], St Thomas Netball Club, Laburnum Netball Club, Blackburn Burners Netball Club and Blackburn Lake Netball club.
- Tennis: Blackburn Tennis Club
- Basketball: Blackburn Vikings - teams playing in the Victorian Junior Basketball League (Juniors) and the Big V Competition (Senior)
- Lawn Bowls: Blackburn Bowls Club - 4 sides starting at Division 1. Large community based club with excellent facilities, at Kalang Park

== Schools ==
There are four primary schools in Blackburn: Laburnum Primary School, Blackburn Primary School, Blackburn Lake Primary School and St Thomas the Apostle School.

There is one high school in Blackburn: Blackburn High School.

== Notable residents ==
- Edith Coleman (1874-1951), naturalist and well-known nature writer who lived at Walsham on Blackburn Road. Famed for her work on orchid pollination, she was the first woman to be awarded the Australian Natural History Medallion. Married to pioneering motorist, James G Coleman, who founded the RACV.
- Josh Gibson, footballer for the Hawthorn in the AFL. He grew up in Blackburn.
- Xavier O'Neill, footballer for the West Coast Eagles. He grew up in Blackburn and played for Blackburn Football Club.

== See also ==
- City of Nunawading – Blackburn was previously within this former local government area.
- Laburnum, Victoria
