= Kingsway, Glen Waverley =

Street in Melbourne, Australia

Kingsway Snedden Drive Victoria
- Coordinates: 37.878443°S 145.164128°E (North end); 37.883434°S 145.165110°E (South end)

General information
- Type: Street
- Length: 1.2 km (0.7 mi)

Major junctions
- North end: High Street Road; Glen Waverley, Melbourne
- O'Sullivan Road; Railway Parade North; Coleman Parade
- South end: Springvale Road; Glen Waverley, Melbourne

Location(s)
- LGA(s): City of Monash
- Suburb(s): Glen Waverley

Kingsway is a shopping, dining and entertainment precinct at the town centre of Glen Waverley, a southeastern suburb of Melbourne, Victoria, Australia. It starts off at the northern end from High Street, and runs north–south parallel to Springvale Road before curving east at its southern end to join the latter as a T-intersection.

Along Kingsway are two major shopping centres, The Glen Shopping Centre at its northern end, which offers more than 3,500 parking spaces; and Century City Walk at its southern end, which contains a Village Cinemas multiplex, other entertainment retailers (such as Strike Bowling Bar), a tavern and various eateries, as well as Novotel and Ibis. The Glen Waverley railway station is located just on the west of its middle section, and the City of Monash City Council and Civic Centre, the Glen Waverley Public Library, Uniting Church and Centrelink Office are also located at Kingsway.

== Retailers ==
Kingsway has a range of shopping, dining and entertainment retailers, but is best known for its eateries. Retailers include Asian influenced and other restaurants and cafes, travel agencies, clothing stores, hairdressers, grocery stores, gift shops, a newsagency, after school tuition centres, pharmacies and mobile phone dealers. Larger retailers include Dan Murphy's, Village Cinemas and Intencity. Other major retailers such as Woolworths, Coles, David Jones, Target and Lincraft are located inside The Glen Shopping Centre.

Service providers include Real Estate agents, four bank branches and dry cleaners. Other service providers are located within The Glen Shopping Centre.

== Hotels ==
Nearby hotels include Novotel, Hotel Ibis, Waverley International Hotel and Quest Serviced Apartments.

== Public transport ==
The Kingsway shopping precinct is served by buses and trains. Glen Waverley railway station is the terminal station for the Glen Waverley railway line. The bus interchange north of the station on Railway Parade North acts as a hub for transport activity in the Glen Waverley area.

=== Bus ===
Routes	Operator	Zone(s)	To / From	Via
623	CDC Melbourne	1, 2	Glen Waverley / St. Kilda	Mount Waverley / Chadstone / Carnegie
734	Ventura Bus Lines	1, 2	Glen Iris / Glen Waverley	Ashburton / Ashwood / Wesley College
736	Ventura Bus Lines	2	Mitcham / Blackburn	Vermont South / Glen Waverley / Forest Hill
737	Ventura Bus Lines	2	Croydon / Monash University	Boronia / Knox City SC / Glen Waverley
742	Ventura Bus Lines	1, 2	Eastland SC / Chadstone SC	Vermont South / Glen Waverley / Oakleigh
753	Ventura Bus Lines)	2	Glen Waverley / Bayswater	Wheelers Hill / Knoxfield / Boronia
754	Ventura Bus Lines	2	Rowville / Glen Waverley	Caulfield Grammar / Wheelers Hill
850	Grenda's Bus Services	2	Dandenong / Glen Waverley	Brandon Park / Mulgrave

== Redevelopment ==
In January 2006, the Monash City Council agreed in principle to the redevelopment of the transport hub and began to negotiate with VicTrack Access to develop a mixed-use multi storey building located in the forecourt area of the Glen Waverley Railway Station. This development is part of the Victorian Government's Melbourne 2030 plan. The redevelopment will include a multi-deck car park, multi-story residential and commercial buildings and a pedestrian bridge or underground crossing linking both buildings. The Glen Waverley Railway Station is also planned to be redeveloped. The first stage of redevelopment, entailing preliminary roadworks is due for completion in October 2009. The Kingsway Realignment Project is jointly funded by Monash City Council, the Department of Planning and Community Development's 'Creating Better Places Program' and VicTrack.

== Festivals ==
Kingsway hosted Glen Waverley's inaugural Food and Wine Festival in November 2009. The festival was primarily funded through the Monash City Council having approved $80,000 in funding in 2008, and included many Kingsway retailers and Victorian wineries. The streets surrounding Kingsway was closed off to traffic.

An inaugural Chinese New Year Lantern Festival was held in February 2009.

== Major intersections ==
LGA	Location	km	mi	Destinations	Notes
		High Street Road (Metro Route 24) – City, Knoxfield			
		O'Sullivan Road			
		Railway Parade North			
		Coleman Parade			
		Springvale Road (Metro Route 40) – Springvale, Glen Waverley			

== Sources ==
- Metlink Melbourne
- Monash City Council
- Glen Waverley Trader Association
