= Syndal Heatherdale Pipe Reserve Trail =

Shared use path in Melbourne, Australia

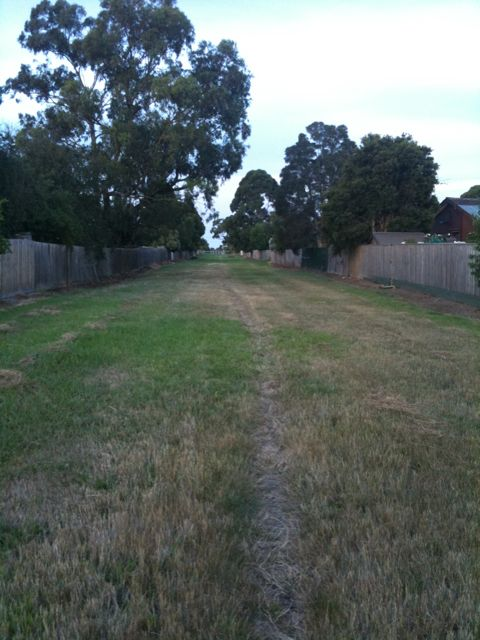
- The trail near Highbury Road
- Length: About 10.3 km
- Location: Melbourne, Victoria, Australia
- Difficulty: Difficult in poorly maintained gravel sections
- Surface: Lined concrete path from Highubury Road to Ballantyne Street, Goat track or Gravel for remainder
- Hills: Hilly in the north end
- Train(s): Heatherdale, Syndal
- Tram(s): Sevenoaks Rd/Burwood Hwy, Route 75

The Syndal Heatherdale Pipe Reserve Trail is a shared use path for cyclists and pedestrians, which follows the Syndal to Heatherdale pipe reserve in the eastern suburbs of Melbourne, Victoria, Australia.

The trail is navigable from one end to the other but most of the path is a poorly maintained gravel surface, with the only paved surface being between Highbury Road and Ballantyne Street. Monash Council has released a tender for construction of the section from Highbury Road to High Street Road, while Whitehorse Council is currently planning for construction of the path from Mahoneys Road to Norma Road. Bicycle Victoria sees this as an important route, linking the Syndal railway station with the Tally Ho business park on Burwood highway, as part of an ongoing demand for a fully integrated transport strategy in Victoria and is campaigning for improvements to the trail.

== Following the path ==
The southern end of the path starts on the north side of Syndal Station, in Shirley Ave. The path is clear cut except for three short road sections:

- Mahoneys Rd between Panorama Drv and Hawthorn Rd
- Springvale Rd between Husband Rd and Canterbury Rd
- A section along Lucknow Rd and Mitcham Rd

The path terminates in the north at Brunswick Rd in Mitcham, where it meets the Box Hill to Ringwood Rail Trail.

== Connections ==
- Meets the Box Hill to Ringwood Rail Trail at the northern end of the trail on Brunswick Rd in Mitcham.
- Meets the Waverley Rail Trail at Syndal Station. Connects to Scotchmans Creek Trail in the south via a short road section (Blackburn Rd, Falconer St & Flander Ave) that leads to Syndal Station.
- Roughly halfway along the trail, it intersects with the Wurundjeri Walk Trail at Mahoneys Rd. North of and beside "Brand Receptions", go along Parkland Place and cross Mahoneys Rd to the trail.

North end at 37.818525°S 145.205081°E. South end at 37.883955°S 145.146516°E.

== See also ==
- List of rail trails
