= Gardiners Creek =

Coordinates: 37°50′S 145°02′E

Gardiners Creek (Kooyongkoot)
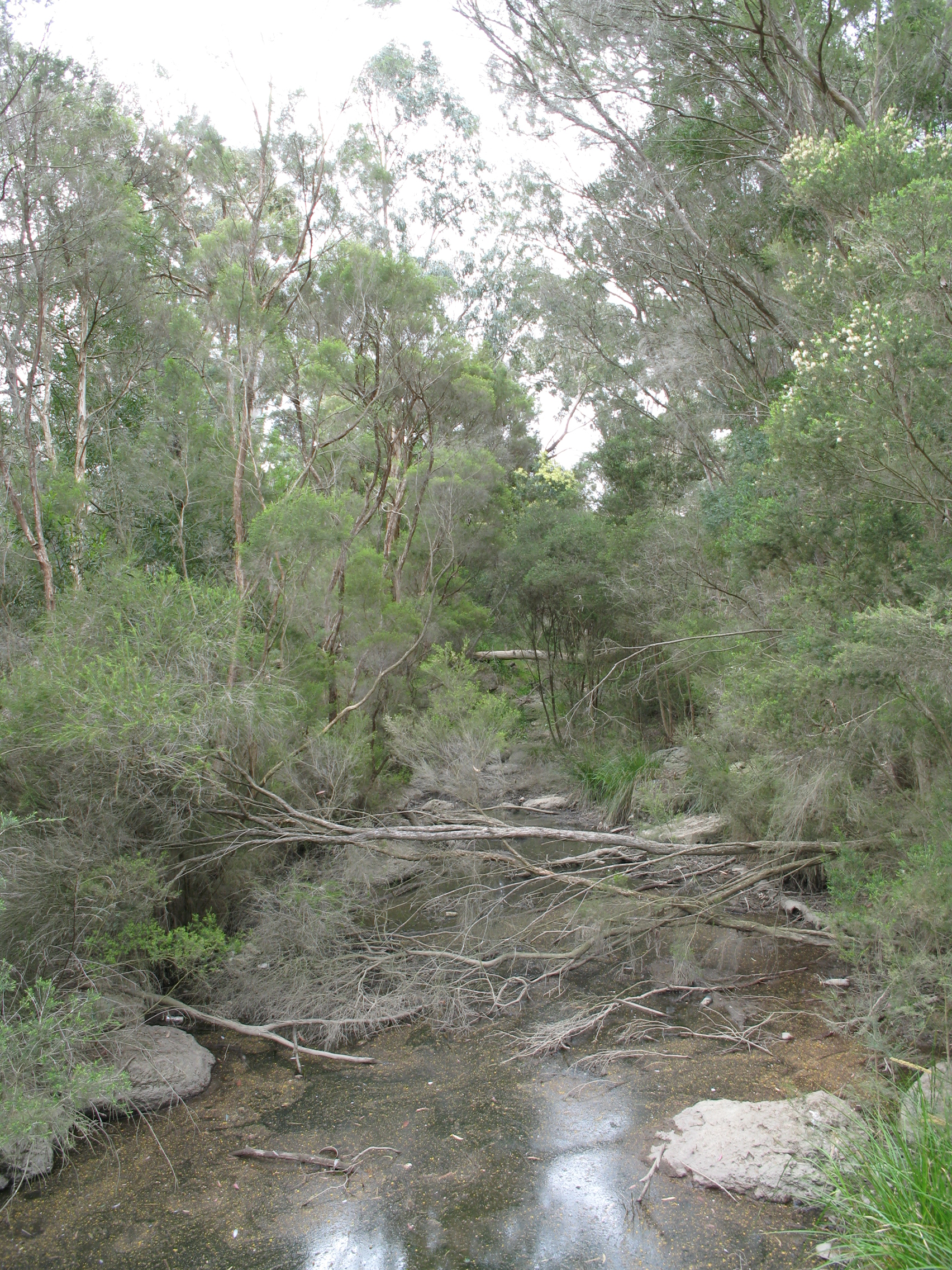
- Gardiners Creek through Blackburn

Location
- Country: Australia
- State: Victoria

Physical characteristics
- Length: 30 km (19 mi)
- Basin size: Eastern suburbs of Melbourne

Gardiners Creek, originally known as Kooyongkoot Creek, is an urban stream in the eastern suburbs of Melbourne, and part of the Yarra River catchment.

Apart from a few sparse surviving remnant riparian bushlands, the majority of the creek's length has been heavily urbanised, and it has been degraded in much the same way as other Melbourne eastern suburban streams such as the Mullum Mullum Creek and Koonung Creek. The Gardiners Creek Trail follows the creek for most of its length.

== Naming ==
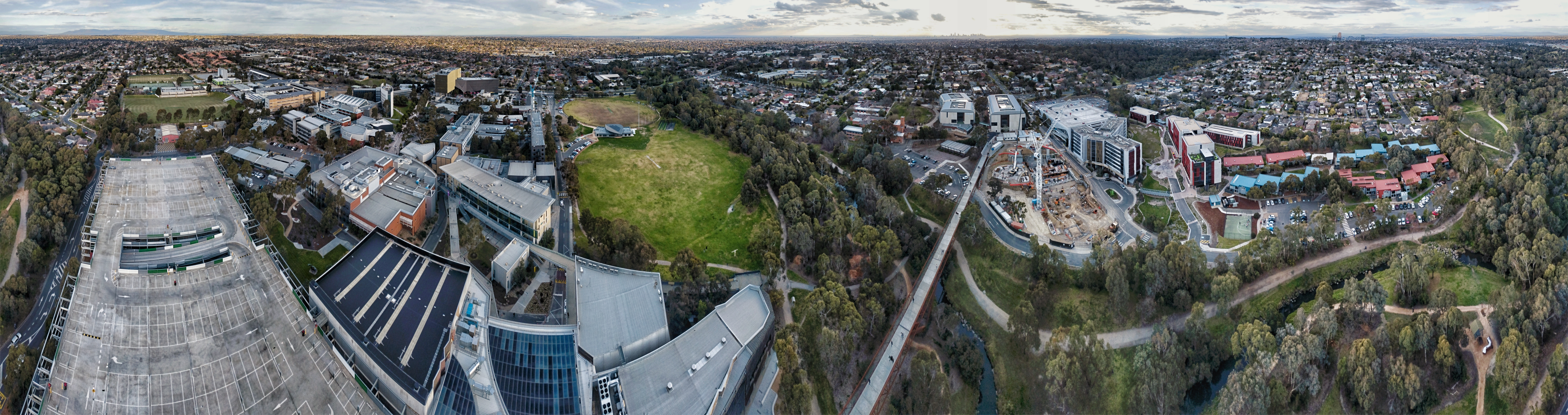
Aerial perspective of Gardiners Creek in relation to Deakin University. Shot September 2018. Altitutude: 110m.

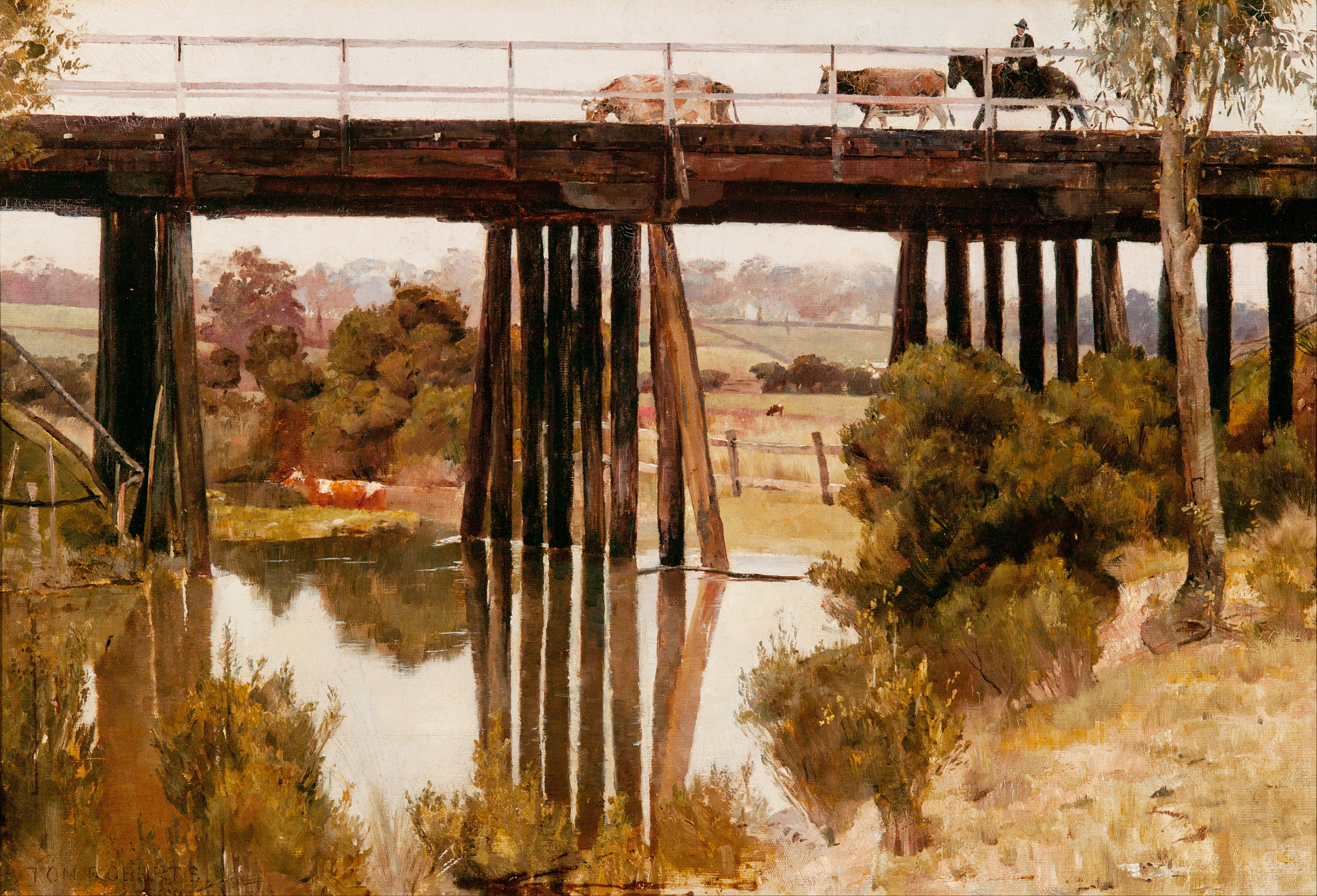
Tom Roberts' 1885 painting Winter morning after rain, Gardiner's Creek

The creek's original name was Kooyongkoot, from the Woiwurrung language of the indigenous Australian Wurundjeri-Baluk group, which translates to 'haunt of the waterfowl'. This name appeared on early maps such as the 1840 Thomas map. The creek's current name was given in honour of early Melbourne land speculator and banker, John Gardiner, who settled near the junction of Kooyongkoot Creek and the Yarra River in 1836.

== Geography ==
=== Course ===
Gardiners Creek is over 30 km (19 mi) in length. The creek originates in the suburb of Blackburn, where drainage from many smaller streams and gullies converge around Blackburn Lake. It then flows southwest through Box Hill South, Burwood, and Ashwood. Approximately at its junction with Scotchmans Creek in Malvern East it turns northwest, then continues through Ashburton, Glen Iris, Malvern, and Kooyong, before finally flowing into the Yarra River in Hawthorn.

=== Tributaries ===
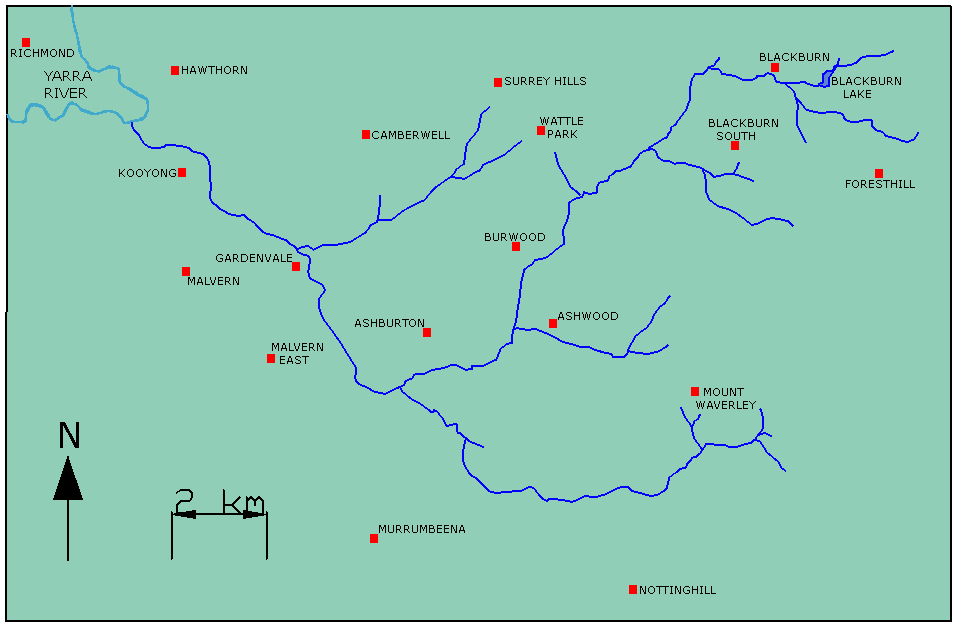
Map of Gardiners Creek and its tributaries

- Unnamed watercourse through Blackburn/Forest Hill
- Unnamed watercourse through Wurundjeri Wetlands
- Damper Creek
- Unnamed watercourse through Ashwood/Mount Waverley

Murrumbeena Creek

- Scotchmans Creek

Hercules Creek

- Back Creek

=== Parklands ===
Upstream to downstream:

- Blackburn Lake Sanctuary (Blackburn)
- Blackburn Creeklands Reserve (Blackburn)
  - Furness Park (Blackburn)
  - Kalang Park (Blackburn)
  - Blacks Walk (Blackburn)
- R.H.L. Sparks Reserve (creek piped underground) (Box Hill)
- Wembley Park (Box Hill South)
- Box Hill Golf Club (Box Hill South)
- Gardiners Creek Reserve (Burwood)
- Local History Park (Burwood)
- Gardiners Reserve (Burwood)
- Ashwood Reserve (Ashwood)
- Markham Reserve (Ashburton)
- Malvern Valley Public Golf Course (Malvern East)
- Darling Park (Malvern East)
- Dorothy Laver Reserve (Glen Iris)
- Dorothy Laver Reserve West (Glen Iris)
- Glen Iris Wetlands (Glen Iris)
- Glen Iris Park (Glen Iris)
- Muswell Bend Park (Glen Iris)
- Glenburn Bend Park (Glen Iris)
- Nettleton Park Reserve (Glen Iris)
- Kyarra Park (separated since freeway construction) (Glen Iris)
- Howard Dawson Reserve (Glen Iris)
- Burke Road South Reserve (Glen Iris)
- Gardiner Park (separated since freeway construction) (Gardiner)
- Tooronga Park (separated since freeway construction) (Malvern)
- Patterson Reserve (Hawthorn)
- H.A. Smith Reserve (separated since freeway construction) (Hawthorn)
- Kooyong Park (Kooyong)
- Kooyong Stadium (Kooyong)

== Transport ==
The Gardiners Creek Trail, a shared use cycling and pedestrian track, follows the general course of Gardiners Creek from Box Hill's boundary with Blackburn to the Yarra River, where a bridge over the river links it to the Main Yarra Trail.

The Monash Freeway/CityLink follow the Gardiners Creek valley from Malvern East to the Yarra River.

=== Crossings ===
Upstream to downstream:

- Central Road
- Lake Road and Weir (Blackburn Lake)
- Jeffery Street
- Blackburn Road
- Main Street
- Blackburn Creeklands Footbridges
- Pakenham Street
- Middleborough Road
- Canterbury Road
- Station Street
- Burwood Highway
- Highbury Road
- High Street Road
- Warrigal Road
- Winton Road
- Darling Park Footbridge
- Dunlop Street
- Glen Iris Park Footbridge
- High Street
- Nettleton Park Footbridge
- Great Valley Road
- Burke Road
- Tooronga Road
- Toorak Road
- Monash Freeway/CityLink
- Glenferrie Road

== See also ==
- Yarra River
- Koonung Creek
- Winter morning after rain, Gardiner's Creek (1885) - a painting by Tom Roberts
