= Syndal High School =

Defunct secondary school in Victoria, Australia

Coordinates: 37°52′1.25″S 145°09′34.20″E

Information
- Established: 1967
- Closed: 1996

Syndal High School (also known as Syndal Secondary School) was a public secondary school located in Glen Waverley, Victoria, and was open from 1967 to 1996.

== History ==
Following World War II there was rapid population growth to the east of Melbourne. Many of these eastern suburbs provided affordable accommodation and were thus popular with returning servicemen as well as immigrants displaced by the war in Europe.

In Syndal, housing was often on subdivided farmland and relatively cheap. Consequently, the Shire's population grew by 2000 a year from 1947 to 1954, increasing to 3000 a year to reach just under 45,000 in 1961, the year that Mulgrave became the City of Waverley (until being renamed the City of Monash in 1995). Various State and Federal Governments recognised the need to provide suitable primary and secondary educational facilities for the children in these newly-established suburbs, and Syndal High School was opened in 1967.

== Architecture ==
The school buildings at Syndal were in the 'C-800' style, popular in Victoria through the late 1960s and early 1970s and still surviving at Westernport Secondary College and the Banksia campus of Keysborough Secondary College. The design consists of a rectangular compound formed from inward-facing classrooms which together enclose a pair of hexagonal-shaped buildings, one a library, and the other a flexible-use cluster of classrooms with an internal hexagonal, highly functional drama room in the centre. This 'hexagon' was designed to enable internal walls to be temporarily reconfigured, allowing for team-teaching of larger groups or other collaborative activities. This functionality has now been reproduced in Glen Waverley Secondary College's Middle School Building, where the reconfigurable classroom design supports Enquiry Learning pedagogies.

== Decline and closure ==
In the late 1980s, the government of Victorian State Premier Joan Kirner introduced the 'District Provision', a program that tied funding to enrolment numbers and forced schools to compete with nearby schools to survive, and based on the rationale that small schools were unable to offer an adequate curriculum. Subsequently, from 1992 the new Liberal government of Premier Jeff Kennett accelerated Kirner's program through a 'Quality Provision'. This delivered $350 million in savings to the education budget but closed 350 schools and removed 9,000 teachers. Syndal High School was one of those closed.

The following extract from the Monash City Council explains the reasoning behind the closure of Syndal High School and others:

Just as new schools are characteristic of new suburbs, so the closing of schools is characteristic of ageing suburbs. By the 1990s the children born in Waverley in the boom years of growth were long grown and most had left the area to form households of their own. Declining numbers of children meant a reduced need for schools. This pattern of the ageing of the suburb was compounded by the fall in the birth rate compared to the baby boom of the postwar years. Schools closed and in a number of cases the sites were sold for housing, particularly medium-density housing. They became part of a general pattern in the late 1980s and 1990s where surplus government land from a number of uses was sold. The overall impact was generally to increase the density of housing in the older areas of the City of Monash.

Prior to closure, Syndal High School continued to operate as a junior campus (years 7 and 8) of Glen Waverley Secondary College for 1995 and the first semester of 1996 to allow for the completion of extensive building works at Glen Waverley's now only campus. The majority of Syndal's facilities were demolished and replaced with housing and new streets (Chesterville Rd, Kwinana Street, Knightsbridge, Epworth, Ingliss and Secomb Courts). With the eventual closure of the junior school in 1996, students and staff from Syndal Secondary School and Lawrence Secondary College (formerly Syndal Technical School) were transferred to the now much larger Glen Waverley Secondary College.

All that remains of Syndal High School is what was once the main hall, now a community facility residing in the grounds of Glendal Primary School and named after long-serving school principal, W.M. Zimmer.
