= Glen Waverley Secondary College =

Coordinates: 37°52′38″S 145°09′46″E

Location
- O'Sullivan Road; Glen Waverley, Victoria 3150; Australia

Information
- Type: Public
- Established: 1960
- Years: 7–12
- Enrolment: 2,250 (2024)
- Colours: Red and blue
- Website: www.gwsc.vic.edu.au

Glen Waverley Secondary College is a non-selective public government school located in Glen Waverley, Victoria, Australia. It is one of the largest secondary schools in Victoria, with 2,250 students and 181 teachers as of 2024. In addition, the college is one of the highest performing state high schools in Victoria, it ranked 59 out of all 530 Victorian high-schools in 2013, based on the Australian Tertiary Admission Rank (ATAR).

== History ==
Glen Waverley Secondary College opened as Glen Waverley High School in 1960 with six old Nissen huts. The early conditions, in May 1960, at the school were described as "appalling" with class sizes of up to 44 students. The total enrolment at the time was 227 students. In October 1960 tenders were opened for the construction of a new high school, to be built at the present location at O'Sullivan Road, to replace the Nissen huts.

In 1967, the college acquired the Nayook site, its first and only rural campus, with the intention to use the area for a plantation, as part of a School Endowment Pine Plantations program. However, from 1970 to 1975, the Nayook site was developed for use as a school camp. The Nayook campus is now run by the Department of Education and Early Childhood Development (DEECD), catering to over 3000 Victorian students, with continued use by Glen Waverley Secondary College.

The school's name was changed after the amalgamation of three secondary schools in the early 1990s to Glen Waverley Secondary College. The amalgamation of Syndal High School, Lawrence Secondary College (also known as Syndal Technical School) and Glen Waverley High School occurred after falling enrolments in the 1980s.

In 1995, the college was selected as a Navigator school along with Bendigo Senior Secondary College, Apollo Parkways Primary School and Essendon North Primary School, as part of a Victorian government initiative to promote the use of technology in teaching.

In 2004, the school received $7.8 million from the Victorian Government in an effort to replace the school's older facilities, becoming the largest recipient of the Victorian Government's school upgrade program. The college has since rebuilt major parts of the campus including a new library, administration building, and Middle School Building. The college's Art Wing and Senior Center were also renovated. In 2013, the college received an additional $159,149 in maintenance funding.

== Curriculum ==
The school is subdivided into two major cohorts: Middle School and Senior School. The Middle School delivers the common Australian curriculum to students from Year 7 to Year 9, with the addition of the 2020 Program. The Senior School delivers the VCE subjects to students in Year 10 to 12.

In 2003, the school was part of a joint scientific experiment with RMIT University and Melbourne Zoo in collaboration with space agencies (NASA, BioServe and SpaceHAB) which involved sending spiders to space. The resulting research by RMIT University was published in the Science in School journal.

The school's curriculum has been a research focus of the Organisation for Economic Co-operation and Development, as a result of the integration of ICT into the curriculum.

== Academic performance ==
In 2006, four students from the College achieved the maximum possible score of 99.95 on the Victorian Certificate of Education, outperforming all schools in the state, except for Penleigh and Essendon Grammar School. Additionally, in 2010 and 2011 the College was the top performing non-selective or specialist state school in Victoria.

In 2013, the school had "38% achieving ATAR scores above 90, [and] 80% above 70". 95% of the cohort received university offers and 5% receiving offers from TAFE or private providers. The College's students also performed above average on the standardised National Assessment Program – Literacy and Numeracy tests, for all areas.

In 2014, Glen Waverley Secondary College had the fourth highest amount of VCE High Achievers after Melbourne High School, Mac.Robertson Girls' High School and Scotch College, Melbourne.

Glen Waverley Secondary College was ranked 11th out of all state secondary schools in Victoria based on VCE results in 2018.

== Alumni ==
Dean Hewitt - Olympic Curler

Ryan Lester - Australian Rules Football player
