= Highvale Secondary College =

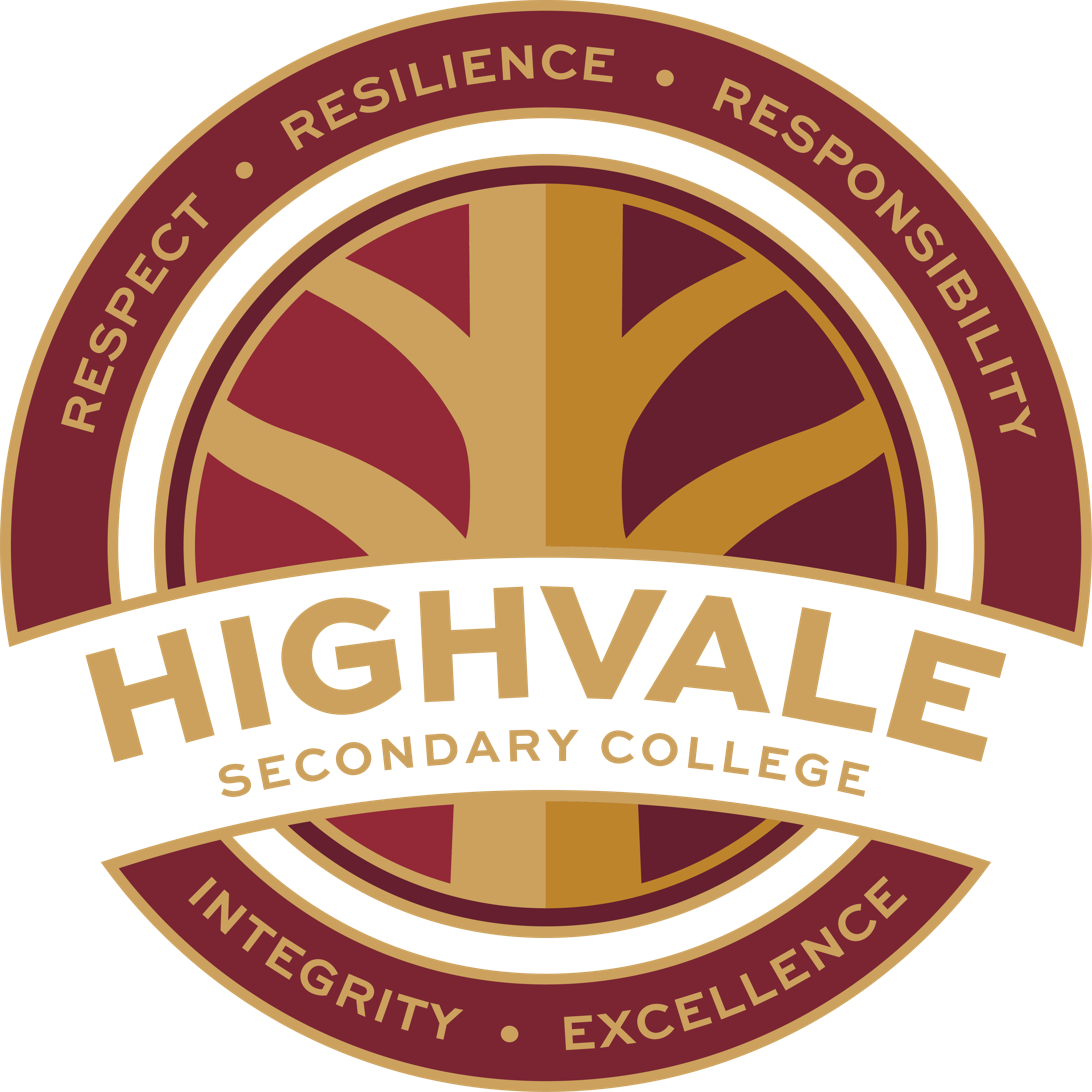

Location
- Capital Avenue; Glen Waverley, Victoria, 3150; Australia

Information
- Type: Public
- Motto: We embrace the learning we do every day, growing as a connected community to lead a better tomorrow.
- Established: 1977
- Principal: Evan Miller
- Years: 7–12
- Enrolment: 1127
- Colours: Maroon and Green
- Website: www.highvalesc.vic.edu.au

Highvale Secondary College is a state high school located in the eastern Melbourne suburb of Glen Waverley, Victoria, Australia.

== Academics ==
In 2013, Highvale Secondary College achieved a 87% pass rate and all Year 12 students were qualified for tertiary entrance. Highvale Secondary College's 2013 VCE results were above state average. The median study score was 31 (the state's average is 30) and 8% of all study scores were at or above 40, placing students in the top 8% in the state (the state's median is 5%). The school was ranked 25th among all public schools. However, in 2017 only approximately 15 people got above 50.00. In that same year, over 31% of the year 12 cohort received an ATAR score of over 80 and over 16% received ATAR score of over 90. The 2013 Dux of Highvale achieved an ATAR of 99.60.

In 2011, Highvale Secondary College was one of the seven public government schools that had at least one student score an atar of 99.90 or above. The other six schools were Melbourne High School, Mac.Robertson Girls' High School, McKinnon Secondary College, St Albans Secondary College, Balwyn High School, Vermont Secondary College.

In 2025, the dux with an ATAR of 99.55 was Siddanth Iruvanti.
