= Winter morning after rain, Gardiner's Creek =

Painting by Tom Roberts

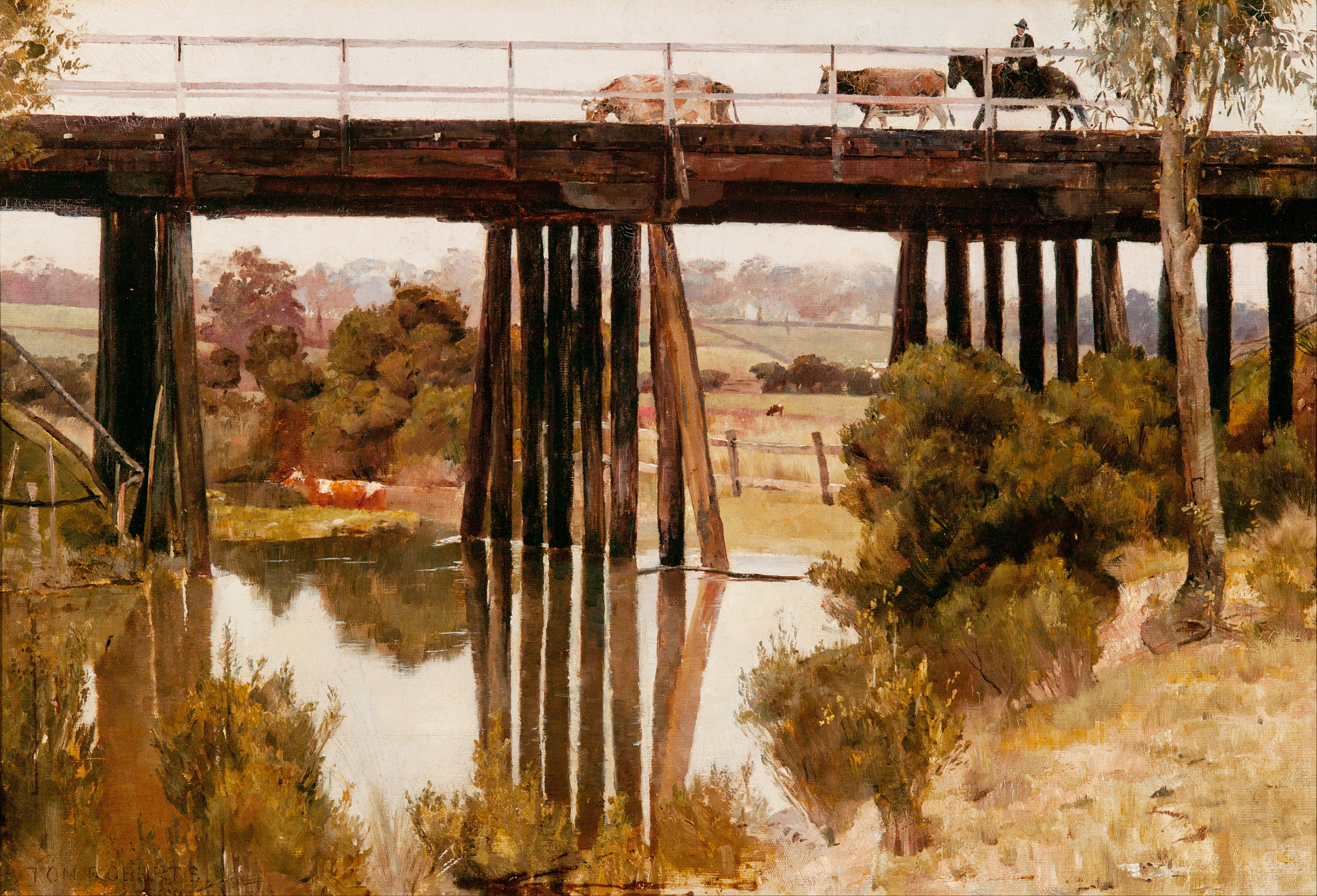
- Artist: Tom Roberts
- Year: 1885
- Medium: oil on canvas
- Dimensions: 47.0 cm × 66.0 cm (18.5 in × 26.0 in)
- Location: Art Gallery of South Australia; Adelaide

Winter morning after rain, Gardiner's Creek is an 1885 painting by the Australian artist Tom Roberts. The painting depicts a man on horseback driving a small group of cattle across a timber trestle bridge over Gardiners Creek, then on the outskirts of Melbourne.

In Roberts’s marvellously designed 1885 view of a bridge over a creek, with its elongated forms created from wooden pillars and their reflections in water, and the inventive positioning of the bridge’s fence, so it becomes a decorative rectangular pattern along the top edge of the painting, Roberts engages in a typical Impressionist subject, and the movement’s interest in unusual visual angles. But he avoids dissolving the subject into a pulverised world of colour effects. The result is a painting much more like Whistler than Monet ...

— Matthew Collings,

The painting was acquired by the Art Gallery of South Australia in 2011 as a gift from the MJM Carter AO collection to celebrate the gallery's 130th anniversary.

== See also ==
- List of paintings by Tom Roberts
