= Blackburn Lake Sanctuary =

Bushland sanctuary in Melbourne, Victoria, Australia

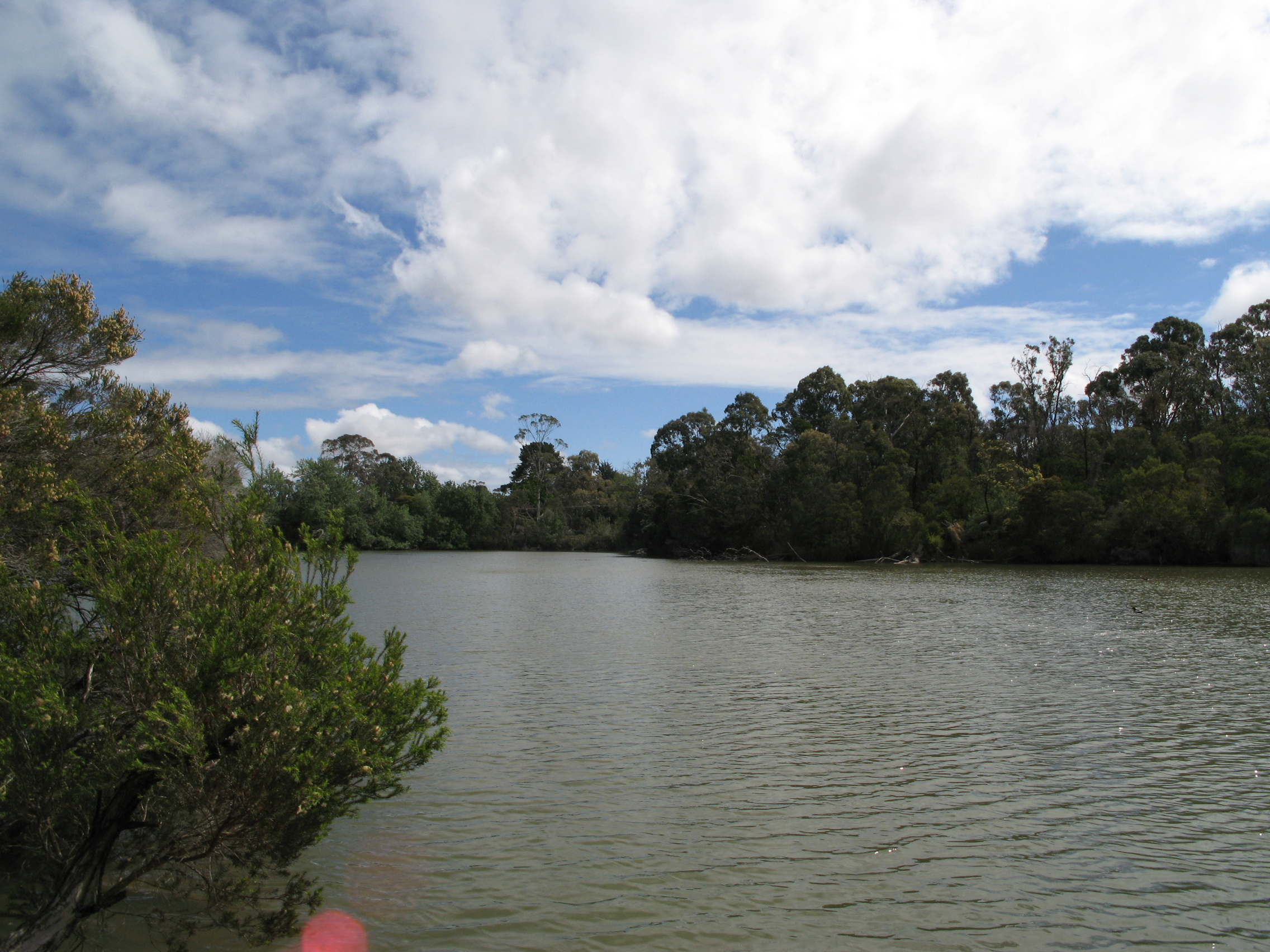
- Blackburn Lake, looking south

- Location within Melbourne
- Interactive map of Blackburn Lake Sanctuary
- Type: Bushland park
- Location: Blackburn, Melbourne, Victoria, Australia
- Coordinates: 37°49′34″S 145°09′43″E
- Area: 27 ha (67 acres)
- Established: 1889 (lake formed)
- Opened: 1965; 61 years ago
- Operator: City of Whitehorse
- Open: All year; Sunday: 2-4pm (visitors' centre)
- Status: Open
- Paths: Unsealed bush paths and trails
- Terrain: Bushland; lake
- Water: Blackburn Lake; Kooyongkoot Creek
- Vegetation: Australian natives; wildflower farm; palm trees
- Species: 150–180 sp. birds; snakes; lizards; turtles; fish; frogs; possums and sugar gliders
- Public transit: – Blackburn + walk; –; – Gardiners Creek Trail
- Facilities: Barbecues; drinking fountains; picnic area; playground; seating and shelters; toilets; visitors centre
- Website: blackburnlakesanctuary.org

Register of the National Estate
- Official name: Blackburn Lake Sanctuary
- Type: Defunct register
- Designated: undated
- Reference no.: 5709

The Blackburn Lake Sanctuary is a 27-hectare (67-acre) bushland park located in Blackburn, an eastern suburb of Melbourne, in Victoria, Australia. Formally set aside as a park in 1965, the regenerated and remnant bushland surrounds a man-made lake that was created in 1889 by the damming of the Kooyongkoot Creek.

The park sits on the traditional lands and waterways of the Wurundjeri Woi Wurrung and is operated by the City of Whitehorse. The bushland park was added to the now defunct Register of the National Estate on an unknown date.

== Description ==
Blackburn Lake is situated at the centre of the sanctuary. The park has a diverse modern history revolving around the human usage of the lake and surrounding bushland, which by the 1960s left the lake in particular, very polluted. The late 20th century saw much regenerative planting and protection measures by local residents and community groups which has halted and, in some places, reduced pollution. Today, the park is home to a variety of local wildlife, including Pacific black ducks and herons. The sanctuary also features a variety of other birds, as well as possums and sugar gliders.

== History ==
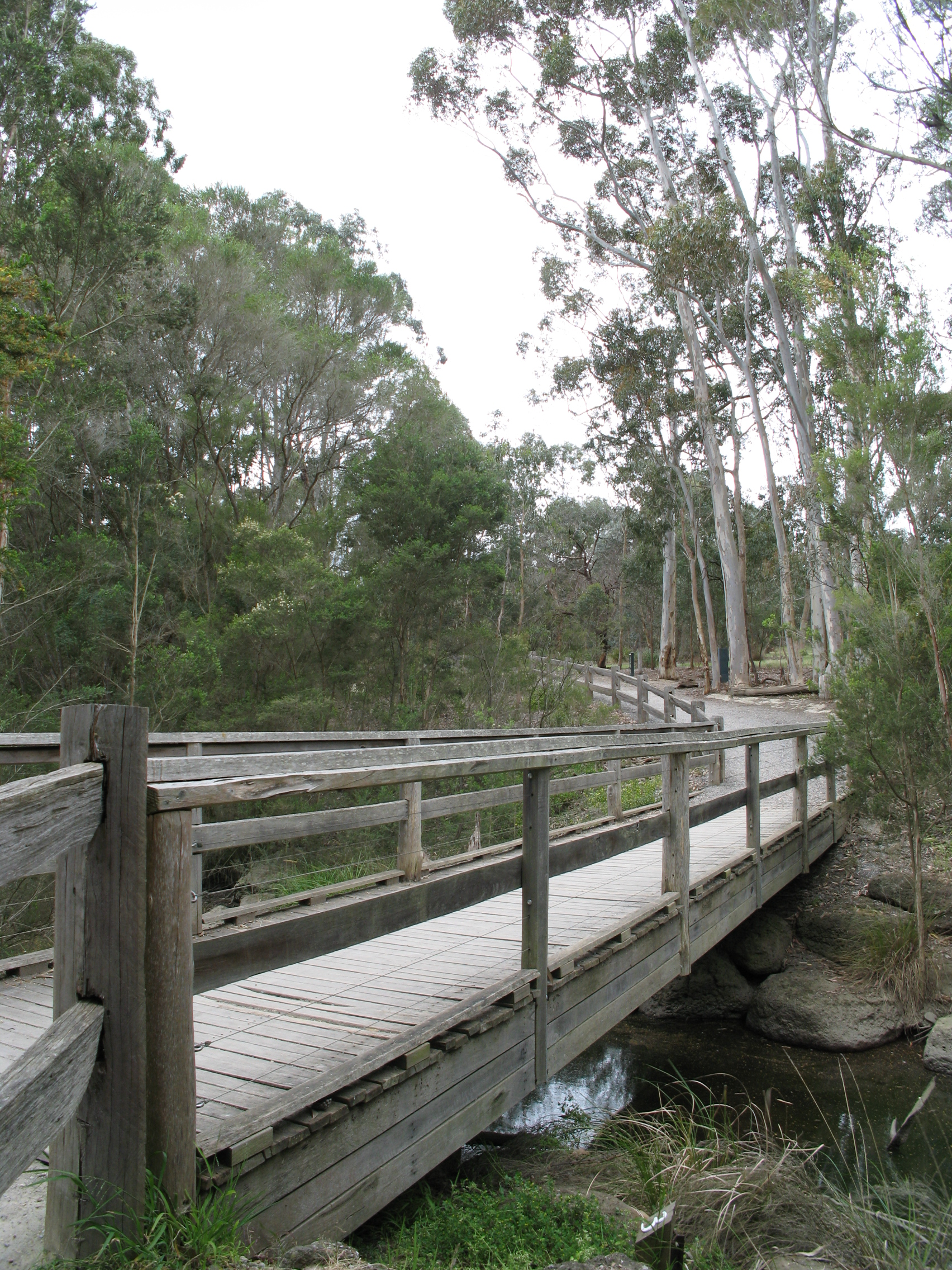
Friends Bridge over an arm of Blackburn Lake

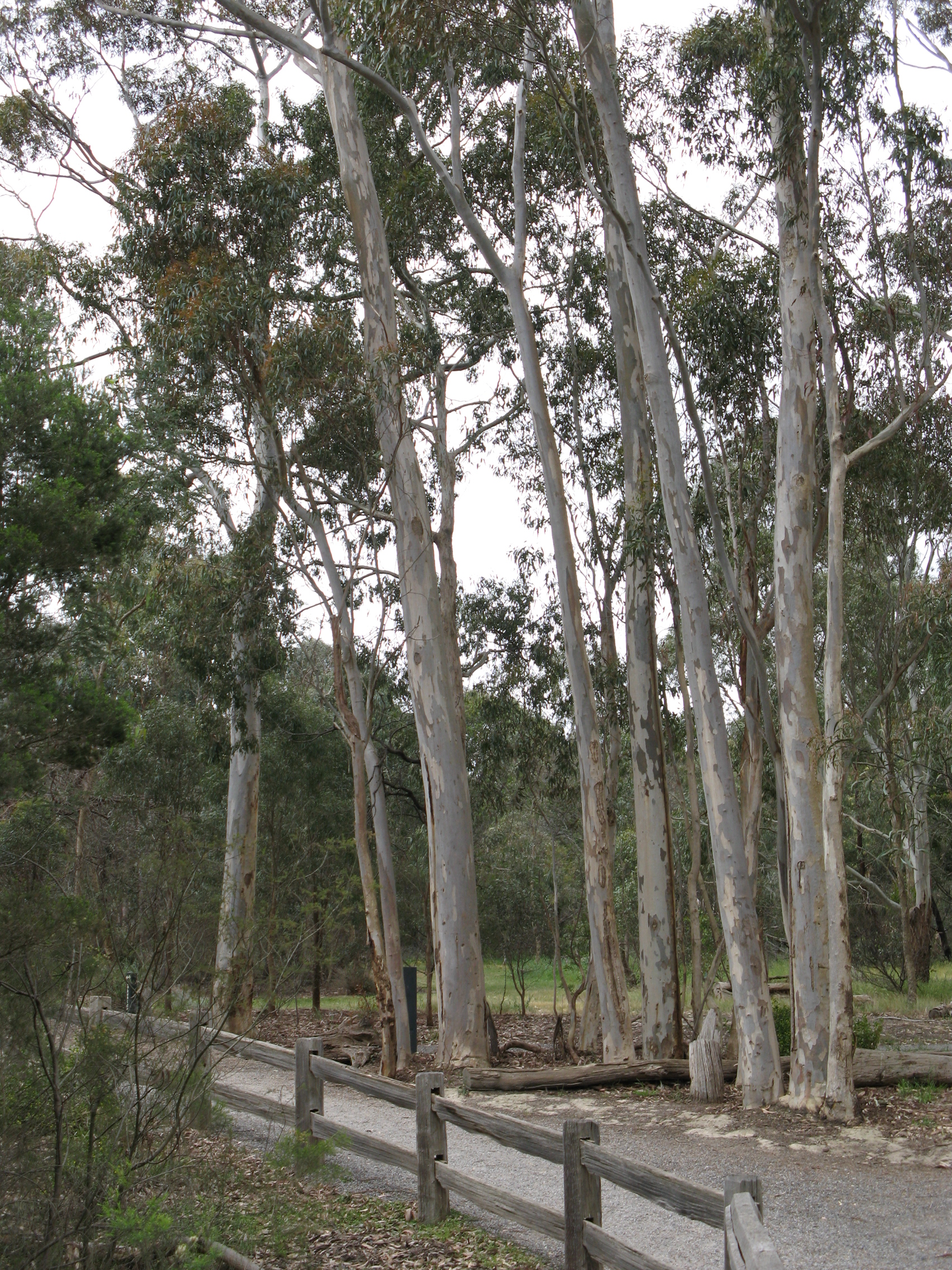
Eucalypts and a gravel pathway in Blackburn Lake Sanctuary near the old flower farm

The park sits on the traditional lands and waterways of the Wurundjeri Woi Wurrung.

=== 19th and 20th century ===
Much of the history of the park revolves around the damming of Kooyongkoot Creek and its use over time.

In 1889 Kooyongkoot Creek, then known as Gardiners Creek, was dammed to provide water for local orchards. The lake grew in popularity as a tourist destination, with visitors from Melbourne travelling two hours by steam train to reach it. During the 1890s, artist Frederick McCubbin of the famed Heidelberg School lived briefly near the lake, where he painted works including Down on His Luck, The Bush Burial, and Bush Idyll.

In 1909 the Adult Deaf Society purchased the land surrounding the lake, where they established a hospice and a flower farm. In 1964 the Society sold the lake and the land around it to the Melbourne Water Board, and in 1965 the area was declared a sanctuary. Later public purchases increased the size of the sanctuary until it reached its current size in 1992. The Visitor Centre was refurbished in 1991 to accommodate an expanded education programme.

== Geography ==
The park sits on c.27 hectares (67 acres), close to the city centre of Blackburn, approximately 18 kilometres (11 mi) east of the Melbourne city centre.

=== Blackburn Lake ===
Before the damming of Kooyongkoot Creek, the waterway wound its way down the valley from Mitcham to Blackburn on its way to the Yarra River. It would have been joined along the way, particularly in winter, by many little rivulets and streams; some of these gullies can still be seen as you walk around the reserve today. In summer, the creek is suspected to have dried up at times.

The lake was dammed in 1889, initially to provide water for local orchards, and was later used for various reasons and activities until the late 1970s. Activities on the lake are limited to protect the surrounding environment. The lake is fed by a number of small creeks to its east and many small surrounding gullies. The embankment dam wall is located in lake's west reaches, Lake Road runs along the top of this wall. Kooyongkoot Creek heads west from the dam wall, through the beginnings of its confluence with the Yarra River.

The lake was initially c.15 metres (50 ft) deep where the creek had been mined for antimony. Recent studies show that it is not that deep today, having silted up in the intervening years. In the 1920s, diving towers were erected and swimming lessons were held at the lake, the water quality was as yet unaffected by surrounding land clearing, agriculture and development. The Blackburn Swimming Club was forced to close in 1931 due to vandalism of the facilities.

During the 1950s and 1960s, the lake became a dumping ground for rubbish, and there are supposed to be old car bodies and other rubbish at the bottom. These would have leached acids, lead and hydrocarbons into the water over the years. Pollution in the lake renders it unusable as a source of water for the surrounding human population or agriculture. In 1962 the dam wall in Lake Rd was built by the MMBW to form a retarding basin to prevent flooding further down Kooyongkoot Creek, and the Lake Rd Bridge was demolished in 1965.

The bridges that cross the lake and its creeks and gullies include:

- Friends Bridge (early 1900s, rebuilt 1981)
- Billabong Bridge (built 1980s)
- Lake Road Bridge (built 1888, demolished 1965, rebuilt 2002)

== Recreation ==
Throughout the park's modern history, much of the recreation in the park revolved around the lake, however today recreation revolves around the appreciation of the Australian native flora, much of which has been regenerated over time. The park is popular with bushwalkers. Cycling is also popular and is usually only partaken locally as the park does not host a cycling through-route trail.

In conjunction with the City of Whitehouse, volunteer support an education program with activities for children and adults.

== See also ==
- Parks and gardens of Melbourne
- Lakes and reservoirs of Melbourne
- Protected areas of Victoria
