= Syndal, Victoria =

Neighbourhood in Melbourne

Coordinates: 37°52′19″S 145°08′53″E

Syndal is an unbounded locality in the Melbourne suburbs of Glen Waverley and Mount Waverley in Victoria, Australia around the intersection of High Street Road and Blackburn Road. It is in the local government area of the City of Monash. From the intersection down to Syndal railway station on Coleman Parade, is the Syndal Shopping Centre. This strip is a highly populated commercial area encompassing a number of diverse local interest stores including several take-away food shops, a laundromat, a bridal store, a dry cleaner and many others in between.

The commercial area is renowned for many long established specialist businesses. The intersection used to have three petrol stations, three banks (the Commonwealth Bank, the State Bank of Victoria, and Westpac), and two supermarkets including Schultz's supermarket owned and run by the Brownlow Medal winner John Schultz and his brother Robert Schultz. Today, Syndal has no banks, petrol stations, or supermarkets.

At one point in time there were five schools, three primary schools and two secondary schools, containing the name Syndal – The former schools of Syndal High School, Syndal Technical School, and Syndal Primary School, and the continuing Syndal North Primary School (now Mount Waverley North Primary School), and Syndal South Primary School.

Syndal has a nominated Australia Post postal office, although Syndal is still part of the greater Mount Waverley and Glen Waverley suburbs, and shares the same postal code as Mount Waverley, 3149, or Glen Waverley, 3150.

Syndal was originally the name of a 114-acre (0.46 km^{2}) farm owned by Redmond Barry on High Street Road, which was purchased off Barry by the Coleman family who consolidated a number of farms at the time. The name for the locality was reclaimed in 1930 when the Glen Waverley railway line was opened and the name for the station at Blackburn Road and Coleman Parade had to be decided. The centre of the Syndal locality, and the original Syndal property is on High Street Road, west of the Blackburn Road intersection.
