= Waverley Rail Trail =

Rail trail in Victoria, Australia

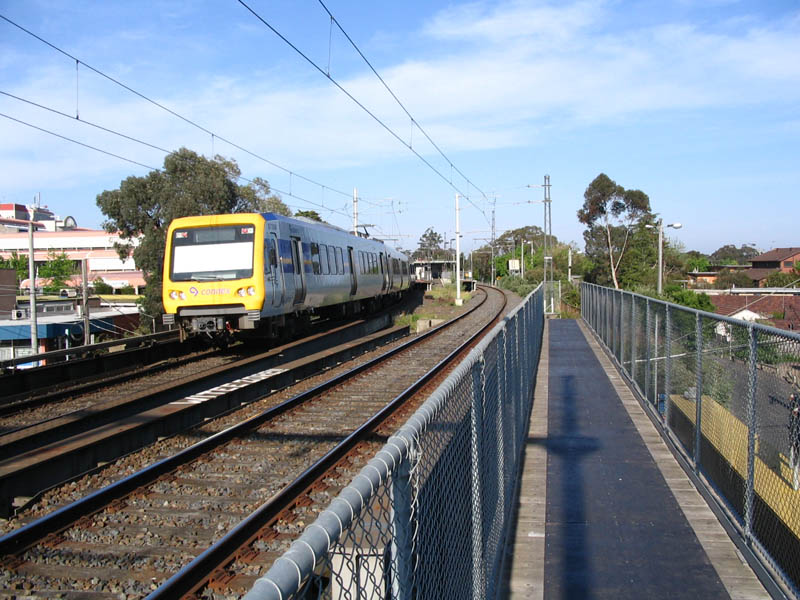
- Bridge over Warrigal Rd looking west
- Location: Melbourne, Victoria, Australia
- Difficulty: Easy to medium
- Hazards: Road crossings
- Surface: Bitumen and concrete
- Hills: Moderate hills
- Water: none
- Train: Glen Waverley line
- Tram: None

Trail map
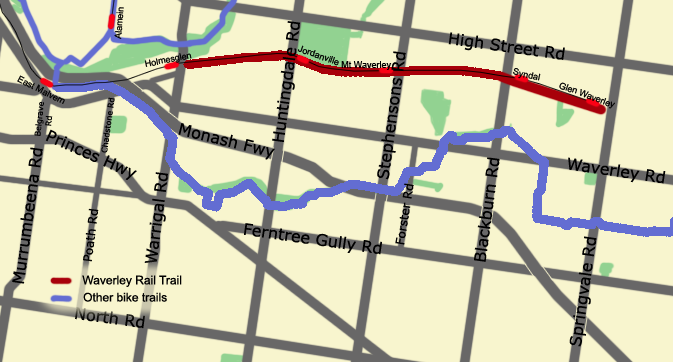

The Waverley Rail Trail is a combination of shared use path for cyclists and pedestrians and on-road bicycle route, which follows the Glen Waverley railway line from Holmesglen railway station to Glen Waverley railway station in the south-eastern suburbs of Melbourne, Victoria, Australia.

== Route ==
The path begins at the eastern end of Holmesglen railway station. Trail users can either cross Warrigal Road at the traffic lights and join the trail on the southern side of the railway line, or cross the railway bridge on the northern side and continue for approximately 200m to the pedestrian crossing across the railway line. The path continues until it reaches Paringa Court. It then crosses Power Avenue and continues up Railway Parade South to Huntingdale Road. It crosses at the traffic lights, then continues through Jordanville railway station car park to Windsor Avenue. The trail runs to the end, then goes through the Mount Waverley railway station car park where the path resumes at the eastern end of the platform. The path continues to Blackburn Road where trail users must cross at the lights and continue past Syndal railway station and up Coleman Parade to Glen Waverley railway station where the trail ends.

== Connections ==
- The Scotchmans Creek Trail (1 km) and Gardiners Creek Trail (2 km) can be reached by travelling west from Warrigal Road at Holmesglen railway station. Trail users cross the pedestrian bridge over Warrigal Road to access Argyll Street then continue to the end of Argyll Street. At that point a short path ascends to Golfers Drive. The trail follows Golfers Drive using the section of path that continues to Waverley Road. It then passes under the highway to arrive at the Scotchmans Creek Trail.
- Syndal Heatherdale Pipe Reserve Trail starts at Syndal railway station.
- A signed on road route from Glen Waverley railway station leads to the Dandenong Creek Trail at Jells Park.
