= Glen Waverley =

- Suburb
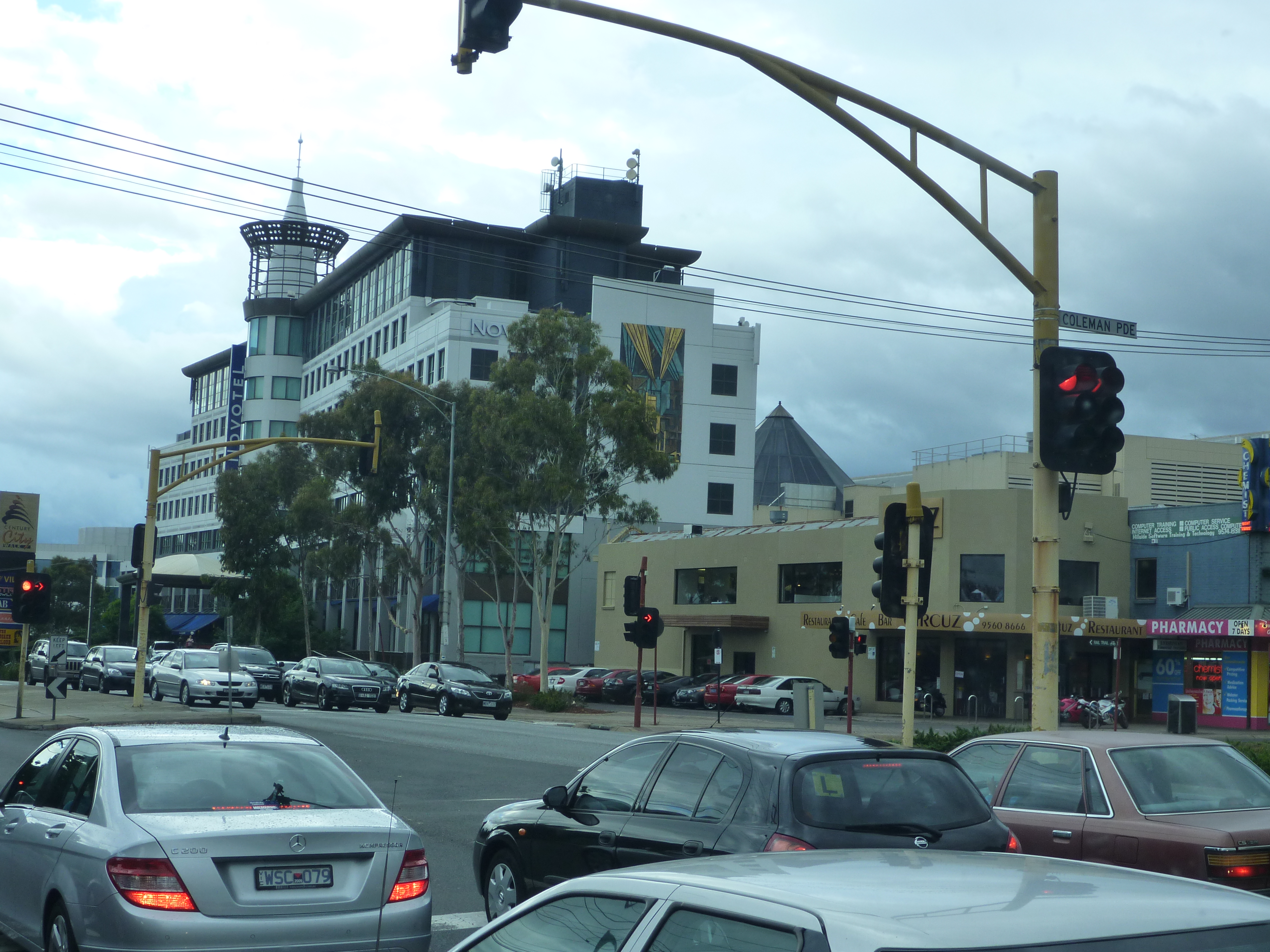
- Springvale Road, Glen Waverley

- Interactive map of Glen Waverley
- Coordinates: 37.880°S 145.164°E
- Country: Australia
- State: Victoria
- City: Melbourne
- LGA: City of Monash
- Location: 19 km (12 mi) from the Melbourne CBD

Government
  - State electorates: Glen Waverley; Oakleigh
  - Federal divisions: Chisholm; Hotham

Area
  - Total: 16.8 km^{2} (6.5 sq mi)

Population
  - Total: 42,642 (SAL 2021)
- Postcode: 3150
Suburbs around Glen Waverley
| Burwood East | Vermont South | Vermont South |
| Mount Waverley | Glen Waverley | Wantirna South |
| Notting Hill | Mulgrave | Wheelers Hill |

Glen Waverley is a south-eastern suburb of Melbourne, Victoria, Australia, located 19 km (12 mi) southeast of the Melbourne central business district. It is the council seat of the City of Monash local government area and a prominent suburban commercial district, as well as a local transport hub as the interchange between the Glen Waverley line terminus and the upcoming SRL East ring line. Glen Waverley recorded a population of 42,642 at the 2021 census.

== History ==
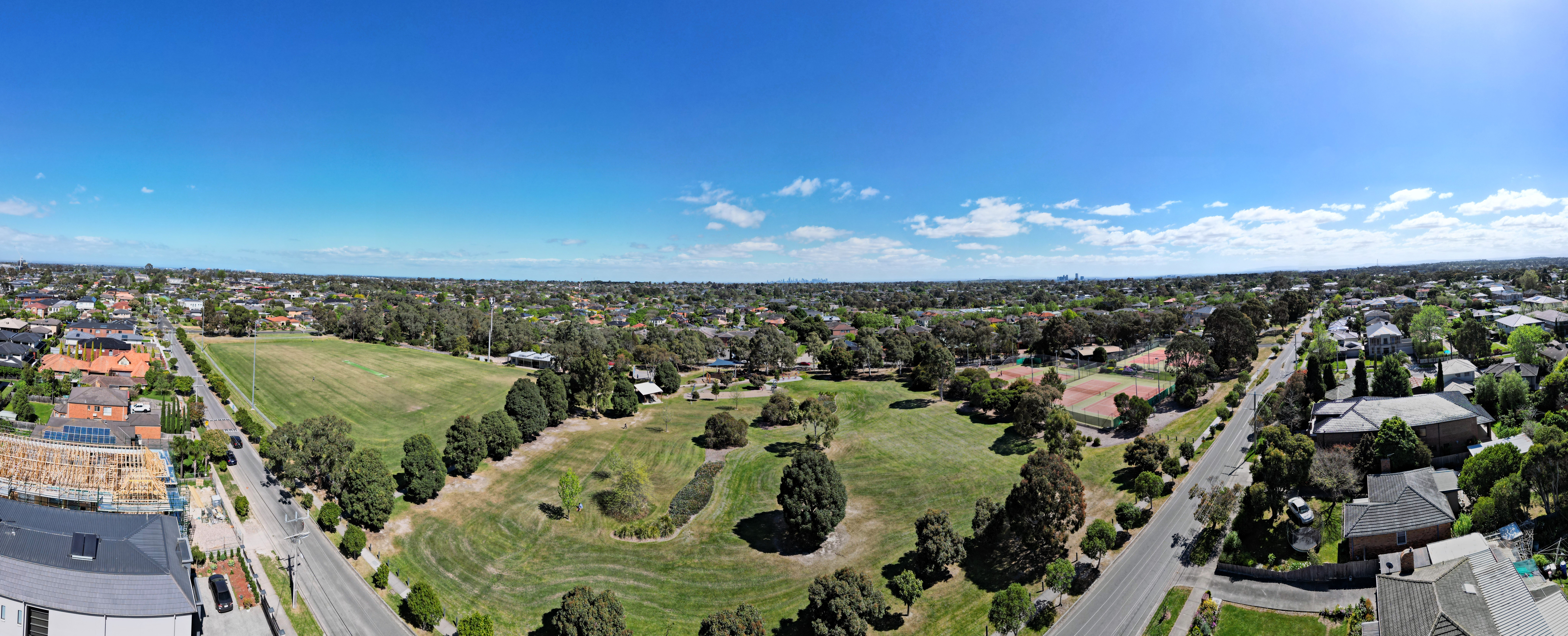
Aerial panorama of Glen Waverley North, facing the Melbourne skyline. October 2023.

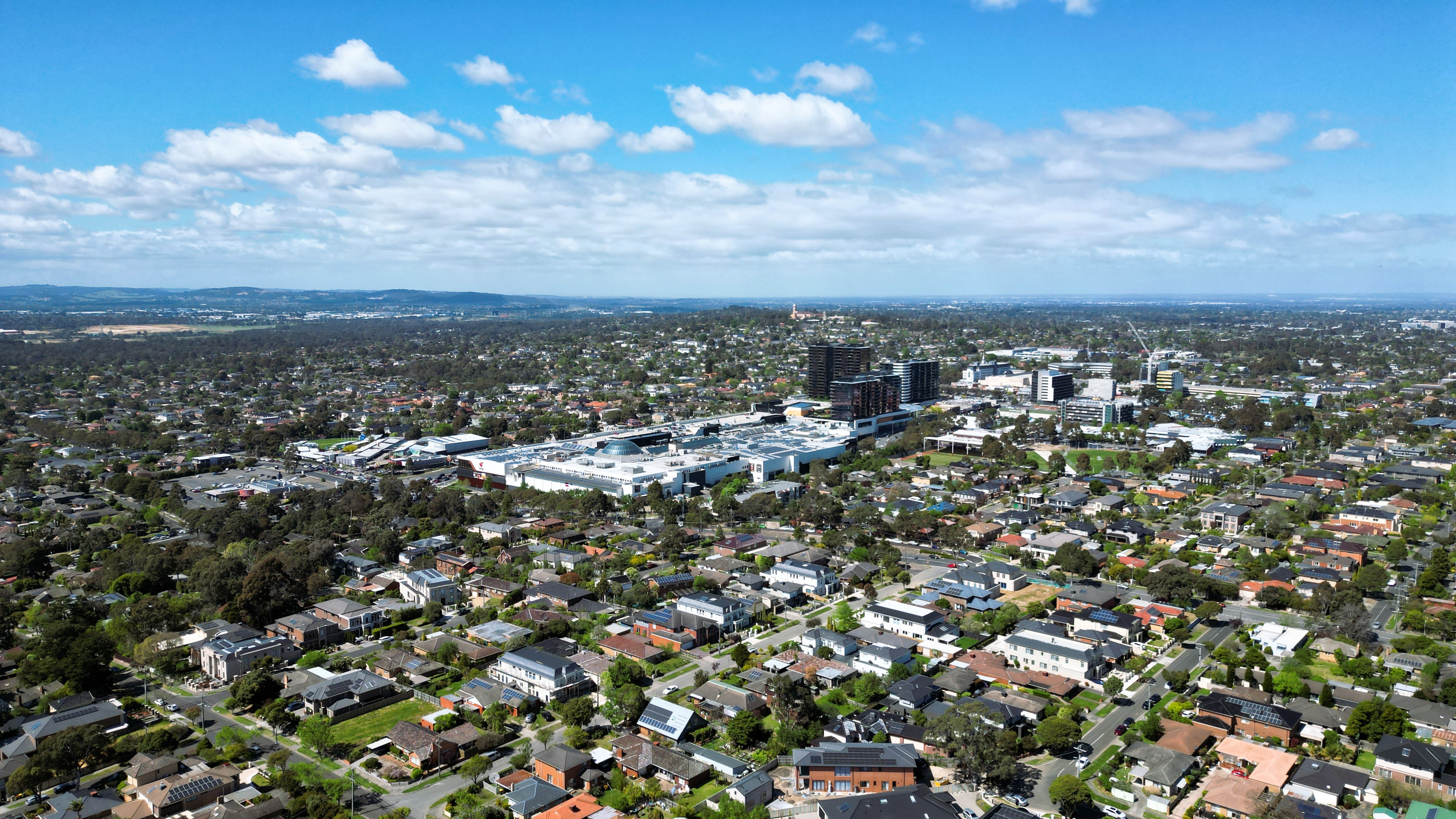
The Glen Shopping Centre and its outlook of the Dandenong Ranges. October 2023.

The area was first settled in the mid nineteenth century and later developed as orchards and farming lands. The Post Office opened on 1 July 1885 as Black Flat in the area to the south of the railway line, was renamed 'Glen Waverley' in 1921, and Glen Waverley South in 1963 on the same day. Glen Waverley North office (open since 1954) was renamed Glen Waverley (from 1994 The Glen). The name "Waverley" comes from a novel by Sir Walter Scott.

Major development occurred in the 1950s to 1970s with rapid infilling of housing built to a generally high standard on large (typically 800m^{2}) blocks. In particular Legend Park Estate was opened by Hooker Rex in 1971. Much of that housing stock is now ageing and renewal is occurring, frequently involving subdivision of the larger blocks into townhouse development. The suburb was also the site of Victoria's first McDonald's restaurant, which opened on 12 September 1973, at the corner of High Street and Springvale Road. It was opened shortly after the original in Sydney. Following the Sydney McDonald's closure, it became Australia's longest surviving McDonald's until it was demolished in 2016, and subsequently replaced with a modernised version.

== Geography ==
One of the largest suburbs in Melbourne by land area, Glen Waverley is bounded by the Dandenong Creek and Jells Park to the east, Waverley Road and View Mount Road to the southeast, Ferntree Gully Road to the south, Blackburn Road to the west and Highbury Road to the north. Springvale Road, a major north–south arterial, divides the suburb into two asymmetrical halves. The geography varies from river flats adjacent to the Dandenong Creek in the east to the hilly region between the Dandenong Creek and the Scotchmans Creek (a small first-order tributary of the Yarra River) catchments.

== Economy ==
Glen Waverley is home to the only commercial district within its local government area that is north of the Monash Freeway, a suburban region which accounts for more than half of the City of Monash's administrative area. Most of its shopping centres are streetside retail stores and restaurants along and around Kingsway and the Glen Waverley railway station. The Glen Shopping Centre, located at southwestern corner of the junction between Springvale Road and High Street Road, is the eleventh-largest shopping mall in Victoria.

Glen Waverley has also developed to become somewhat of a business hub in metropolitan Melbourne, with many international companies including Toshiba, Ansell, and NEC all having their Australian headquarters in the suburb.

Nicknamed the "Centre of the Universe" (Chinese: "宇宙中心") by the local Chinese Australian residents due to its convenient location and transportation, ample amenities, high-quality schooling, relatively good weather and favourable living conditions, Glen Waverley had the seventh highest number of AUD $1,000,000+ house sales in Melbourne in 2013. Properties in Glen Waverley and surrounding areas continued to show price gains in 2014 and 2015, largely due to interest from Chinese property buyers.

== Demographics ==
Historical population
| Year | Pop. | ±% |
|---|---|---|
| 2001 | 36,591 | — |
| 2006 | 38,217 | +4.4% |
| 2011 | 39,204 | +2.6% |
| 2016 | 40,327 | +2.9% |
| 2021 | 42,642 | +5.7% |

At the 2021 census, Glen Waverley had a population of 42,642. 38.0% of people were born in Australia. The next most common countries or regions of birth were China (excludes SARs and Taiwan) 17.8%, India 8.0%, Malaysia 5.6%, Sri Lanka 5.3% and Hong Kong SAR 2.5%. 35.6% of people spoke only English at home. Other languages spoken at home included Mandarin 23.3%, Cantonese 8.0%, Sinhalese 4.0%, Tamil 3.0% and Hindi 2.7%. The most common responses for religion were No Religion 37.5%, Catholic 11.7%, Buddhism 10.4% and Hinduism 9.8%.

== Politics ==
Most of Glen Waverley's voting booths are within the federal electorate of Bruce (with the remainder in Chisholm). The suburb is traditionally oriented towards the Liberal Party, but has become extremely marginal and competitive in recent years.

This is evidenced in the 2010 federal election results, in which the combined booth results for the suburb produced a primary vote of 40.7% for the Labor Party, 46.0% for the Liberals, and 9.8% for the Greens. After preferences, the split was 49.99% for Labor and 50.01% for the Liberals (a difference of 3 votes).

In the 2019 Australian federal election, the electorate which Glen Waverley is part of, Division of Chisholm, saw both major parties being represented by Chinese-Australian female candidates, Gladys Liu and Jennifer Yang, respectively for Liberal and Labor parties. Liu defeated Yang by 1,090 votes (a margin of 1.1%), in an extremely close race.

The 2020–21 State electoral boundary redivision has seen the creation of the new electoral district of Glen Waverley. Glen Waverley takes in most of the abolished seat of Forest Hill, large parts of abolished Mount Waverley, and small parts of Ringwood and Mulgrave. It was an estimate Liberal margin of 0.9% compared to 1.1% for abolished Forest Hill.

In the 2022 Australian federal election, Australian Labor Party candidate Carina Garland beat out Liberal's Gladys Liu with 56.4% of the votes of the Division of Chisholm, the first time Labor won said seat since 2016.

Carina Garland won this seat again in the 2025 Australian federal election.

== Facilities ==
The main street of Glen Waverley is Kingsway. In recent years, Kingsway has developed into a vibrant dining and entertainment area, with strong Asian influences. Also on Kingsway is Century City Walk, a multiplex mall that houses a Village Cinemas multiplex (equipped with 4DX, VMax and Gold Class facilities), a Strike Bowling Bar and various eateries, as well as many hotels such as Novotel Glen Waverley, Hotel Ibis, Waverley International Hotel, Apartments of Waverley and the Quest Hotel. There is also a large branch of the Monash Public Library Service.

High-rise apartment blocks began featuring with the construction of IBIS Hotel, constructed at the southern end of Kingsway and bordering Springvale Rd. In 2011, IKON Glen Waverley was constructed as a 10-storey apartment, office, retail and car parking complex between the railway station and Kingsway. In 2016, the next multi-storey residence apartment block was announced for 52–54 O'Sullivan Rd, to replace the former The Walk Arcade complex. This project was finally completed in September 2019. The period 2015–2019 also saw major reconstruction work of The Glen which incorporates the Sky Garden apartment complex. Sky Garden was completed in 2019 with residents moving in just prior to the COVID-19 pandemic in early 2020.

The suburb also has numerous churches, and is home to the Victoria Police Academy, which occupies a former Roman Catholic seminary. Located on and adjacent to Kingsway is also the Monash Council Building and Glen Waverley Library.

The Glen (formerly known as "Centro The Glen") is a local regional shopping centre owned, (formerly managed and developed by Vicinity Centres). Although smaller than nearby shopping centres such as Westfield Knox or Chadstone, The Glen has continually grown and evolved. In 2015, plans were announced for a $500M redevelopment which was completed 2019 just prior to COVID and the prolonged shutdown periods that Melbourne endured. Major retail tenants of the current shopping centre include David Jones, Target, Aldi, Coles, Woolworths, Uniqlo, H&M, JB Hi-Fi, Chemist Warehouse and Spotlight. A major feature of the redevelopment, besides the 3 Sky Garden apartment towers, is the fine dining/restaurant precinct. Today Vicinity The Glen has a reputation of being a fine dining and up-market retail experience. The relocation of the food court to the north-east corner has enabled diners to enjoy views looking out to Mount Dandenong.

== Education ==
Glen Waverley is home to Glen Waverley Secondary College, which is considered Victoria's best and one of Australia's best non-selective co-educational public secondary schools. It is also home to the main boarding campus of Wesley College, one of the most expensive private schools in Victoria.

Tertiary students can travel directly to Monash University Clayton campus in about 25 minutes by buses, and to the Melbourne Central (where University of Melbourne and RMIT can then be reached within a mile) in about 50 minutes by Metro train. In the future, students might also be able to travel to the Deakin University Burwood campus and La Trobe University Bundoora campus on a single train trip on the Suburban Rail Loop once (and if) it is completed.

=== Primary schools ===
- Camelot Rise Primary School
- Glendal Primary School
- Glen Waverley Primary School
- Glen Waverley South Primary School
- Highvale Primary School
- Mount View Primary School

=== Secondary schools ===
- Brentwood Secondary College
- Glen Waverley Secondary College
- Highvale Secondary College

=== Private schools ===
- St Christopher's Primary School
- St Leonard's Primary School
- Wesley College (Glen Waverley Campus)

=== TAFE ===
- Holmesglen Institute of TAFE (Glen Waverley Campus)

== Sport ==
The suburb has two Australian rules football clubs, Mazenod Old Collegians Football Club, competing in the Victorian Amateur Football Association, and the Glen Waverley Rovers Junior Football Club, competing in the Eastern Football League.

Soccer clubs include Glen Waverley Soccer Club (founded in 1980), and Waverley Victory Football Club (founded in 2001), they are both members of Football Federation Victoria.

Basketball clubs include Waverley Basketball which was established in 1974 offering junior as well as senior competition.

Tennis clubs include Glen Waverley Tennis Club, Glenvale Tennis Club, Glenburn Tennis Club, Legend Park Tennis Club, St Christopher's Tennis Club, Notting Hill Pinewood Tennis Club and Whites Lane Tennis Club.

Cricket is represented by the Glen Waverley Cougars Cricket Club and the Glen Waverley Cricket Club, who both compete in the Southern District and Churches Cricket League (SDCCL). In season 2009/2010, the Glen Waverley Cricket Club's 50th year, they won the SDCCL Menzies Shield, defeating Mount Waverley Uniting Cricket Club. The Glen Waverley Hawks Cricket Club compete in Wilson Shield of the Box Hill Reporter District Cricket Association. The Richmond cricket club trading as the Monash tigers are the main cricket club in the area playing Victorian Premier cricket. have been at central reserve since 2011 and were at punt road oval since 1854.

Golfers play at the course of the Glen Waverley Golf Club at Waverley Road in the neighbouring suburb of Wheelers Hill.

Glen Waverley has a major recreational and aquatic centre located on Waverley Rd, the Monash Aquatic and Recreation Centre (MARC). It has a range of different swimming pools to cater for everyone's needs with two kid pools, a 40-metre wave pool, a Learn-to-swim pool, an indoor 25-metre pool, an outdoor 50-metre pool and a hydrotherapy pool.

M1 Swimming Club (formerly Waverley Amateur Swimming Club before 2002) has existed at the Monash Aquatic and Recreation Centre (formerly Waverley Swimming Pool) since 1962. There is a large squad swimming program at the MARC which has been operated by Tateswim since 2001. Tateswim runs squads for competitive and non-competitive swimmers, with competitive swimmers racing under the M1 Swimming Club banner. M1 also has members training in squad programs at the Harold Holt Swim Centre (City of Stonnington) and the Glen Eira Sports and Aquatic Centre (City of Glen Eira).

== Transport ==
=== Rail ===
The suburb gives its namesake to the Glen Waverley line, which terminates at Glen Waverley railway station just off the middle of Kingsway. Services depart platform 1 and 2, with a frequency of 7–8 minutes in peak hour, and every 15 minutes in off-peak periods. Glen Waverley station is classed as a Premium Station and is located in Metro Zone 2.

Syndal railway station, also on the Glen Waverley railway line, is located 1 km (0.62 mi) to the west of Glen Waverley station, just 80 m (260 ft) east of Blackburn Road, the suburb's boundary with the neighboring Mount Waverley.

Glen Waverley is also a key interchange hub in the proposed Suburban Rail Loop mega-project and the first SRL East phase. Commuters will be able to change into automated underground trains at the Glen Waverley station and travel south towards Monash University, Clayton or Cheltenham, or travel north towards Deakin University, Burwood and Box Hill. As of May 2026, the project has begun construction works.

=== Bus ===
A number of bus routes operated by Ventura Bus Lines and CDC Melbourne also operate in the area, with connections to Monash University, Chadstone Shopping Centre, Eastland Shopping Centre, Westfield Knox, Rowville, St. Kilda, Glen Iris, Springvale, Blackburn, Mitcham, Dandenong and Croydon. The 902 SmartBus from Chelsea to Airport West, also operates via Glen Waverley at 15-minute frequencies all day in both directions, and at up to 10-minute frequencies in peak periods.

| Routes | Operator | Zone(s) | To / From | Via |
|---|---|---|---|---|
| 623 | CDC Melbourne | 1, 2 | Glen Waverley / St. Kilda | Mount Waverley / Chadstone / Carnegie |
| 734 | Ventura Bus Lines | 1, 2 | Glen Iris / Glen Waverley | Ashburton / Ashwood / Wesley College |
| 736 | Ventura Bus Lines | 2 | Mitcham / Blackburn | Vermont South / Glen Waverley / Forest Hill |
| 737 | Ventura Bus Lines | 2 | Croydon / Monash University | Boronia / Westfield Knox / Glen Waverley |
| 742 | Ventura Bus Lines | 1, 2 | Eastland SC / Chadstone SC | Vermont South / Glen Waverley / Oakleigh |
| 753 | Ventura Bus Lines | 2 | Glen Waverley / Bayswater | Wheelers Hill / Knoxfield / Boronia |
| 754 | Ventura Bus Lines | 2 | Rowville / Glen Waverley | Caulfield Grammar / Wheelers Hill |
| 850 | Ventura Bus Lines | 2 | Dandenong / Glen Waverley | Brandon Park / Mulgrave |
| 885 | Ventura Bus Lines | 2 | Springvale / Glen Waverley | Wanda Street |
| 902 | Kinetic Melbourne | 2 | Chelsea / Airport West | Edithvale / Springvale / Glen Waverley / Nunawading / Doncaster / Greensborough / Broadmeadows |

=== Roads ===
Springvale Road is the main north–south arterial road running through Glen Waverley, with 3 lanes in each direction. Blackburn Road runs parallel to Springvale Road to the west. High Street, and Waverley and Ferntree Gully roads are the main east–west collector roads in Glen Waverley. The Monash Freeway also runs through the south-western corner of Glen Waverley, with access via Ferntree Gully and Springvale roads.

== Notable people ==
- Kevin Bartlett – Australian Rules Football player
- John Blackman – radio and television presenter; famed for Hey Hey It's Saturday
- Hamish Blake – comedian, actor, and investigative journalist; famed for Hamish & Andy (radio show)
- Paula Duncan – actress
- Paul Hester – musician
- John Orcsik – actor
- Phrase (Harley Webster) – MC/rapper
- Erin Trudi Patterson – convicted triple murderer; grew up in Glen Waverley
- Marina Prior – singer
- Sir Garfield Sobers – cricketer
- Shirley Strachan – singer, songwriter, radio and television presenter; famed for Skyhooks
- Frank Woodley – comedian
- Lin Jong – Australian Rules Football player

== In popular culture ==
Glen Waverley served as the fictional suburb of Banksiawood in the 1988 ABC Television children's television series C/o The Bartons by Jocelyn Moorhouse. Some scenes were recorded in the Century City Walk mall, Village Cinema, Townsend Street and the library.

Australian pop group, Bachelor Girl, filmed the music video for their 1999 hit song Lucky Me inside The Glen Shopping Centre. Various parts of the centre are featured distinctly within the music video and the production still online on the group's YouTube channel.

== See also ==
- City of Waverley – Glen Waverley was previously within this former local government area.
- Glen Waverley railway station
- List of places referred to as the Center of the Universe
