= Gardiners Creek Trail =

Shared use path in Melbourne, Australia

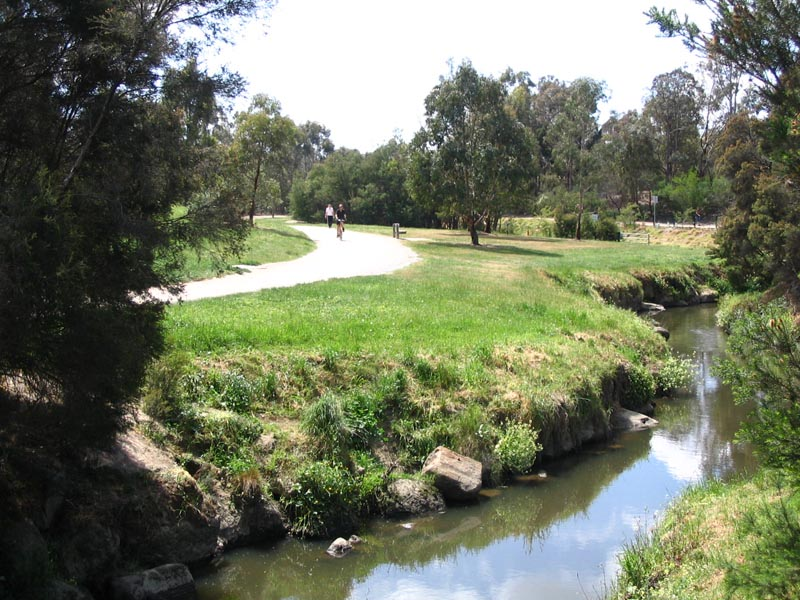
- Gardiners Creek and Trail in Gardiners Reserve, Burwood
- Length: Approx 17 km
- Location: Melbourne, Victoria, Australia
- Difficulty: Mostly easy
- Hazards: Can be very crowded
- Surface: Bitumen
- Hills: Mostly flat
- Water: Water fountains at several locations
- Train(s): Kooyong, East Malvern and Blackburn Stations

The Gardiners Creek Trail is a shared use path which follows Gardiners Creek through the eastern suburbs of Melbourne, Victoria, Australia.

== Following the path ==
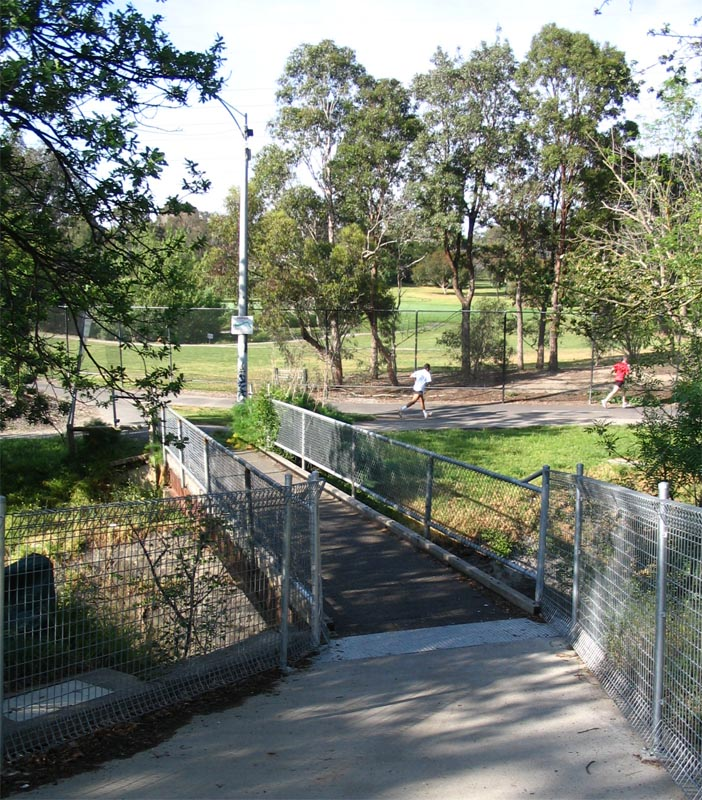
The Solway Street Bridge before it was swept away by flood waters

The path begins as a branch of the Main Yarra Trail, opposite St Kevin's College and Scotch College, close to Kooyong railway station (on the Glen Waverley line); between the suburbs of Toorak, Hawthorn, and Kooyong. The path snakes along Gardiners Creek, near the Monash Freeway. It also goes past Solway Primary School.

Near East Malvern railway station it crosses Winton Road, and shortly after this point the path diverts. The branch to the right leads to a bridge over the Monash Freeway and railway line, giving access to Malvern East railway station or continuing on to pick up the Scotchmans Creek Trail and Malvern East Station to Centre Rd Trail. The main Gardiners Creek Trail continues to the left, crossing the Solway Street Bridge that was rebuilt and opened in late 2011 after being washed away by flood waters in February 2011. Over the bridge the path continues through a small parkland ending on Ryburne Avenue opposite the very southern end of the Anniversary Trail.

To re-access the Gardiners Creek Trail riders can either follow Ryburne Ave and Ashburn Grove to Markham Avenue, or take the Anniversary Trail almost to Alamein station, where another trail splits off to the right and rejoins the Gardiners Creek Trail at Markham Avenue. The trail then continues via Markham Reserve to Warrigal Road. An underpass of Warrigal Road, completed in August 2011, now allows easy access to the path on the east side of Warrigal Road, at the north side of the creek.

The path continues northeast through Ashwood Reserve to High Street Road, which crossed with the aid of a small traffic island, and then north (near Ashwood College) near Gardiners Reserve to Highbury Road. A pedestrian crossing passes over the road, and after crossing the creek on the road bridge the path continues north through Local History Park in Burwood to the intersection of McIntyre Street, Elgar Road, and Burwood Highway, near Presbyterian Ladies' College and the Burwood Campus of Deakin University.

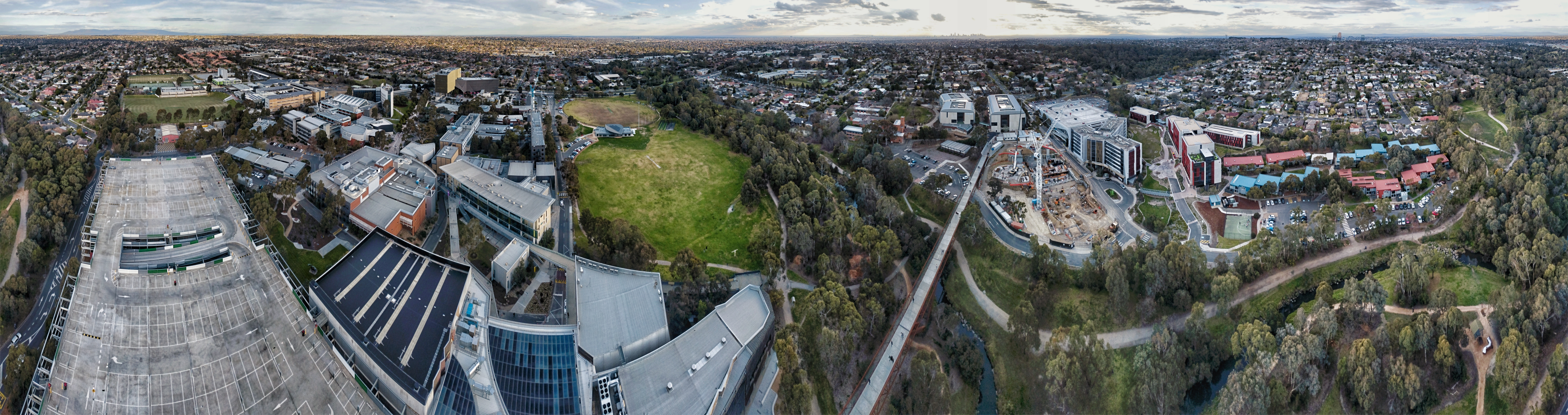
Aerial perspective of Gardiners Creek and trail cutting across the Deakin University Burwood campus. Shot September 2018. Altitutude: 110m.

From Burwood Highway the path continues north-east alongside Deakin University through Gardiners Creek Reserve to Station Street, near the Box Hill Golf Club. Riders have the choice of taking an unsealed, though well made, trail on either side of the creek through Gardiners Creek Reserve; this remains one of the few remaining unsealed sections along the entire trail, but is also one of the few sections with paths on both sides of the creek. Once at Station Street riders can detour to a nearby pedestrian crossing, or cross at the lights at Riversdale Road.

Riders may choose to divert to the Wurundjeri Walk Trail at this point by heading up Boardman Close on the east side of Station St, with the far end of the close leading to the Wurundjeri Walk Trail. To remain on the Gardiners Creek Trail, riders should travel north up Old Station Street, passing immediately by the main golf club entrance, and then turn right at the quiet and dead end part of Riversdale Road. If crossing at the Riversdale Road lights riders can simply continue straight ahead along Riversdale Road. The trail resumes at the end of Riversdale Road alongside the carpark of the golf club. Regardless of which route is being taken beyond Station Street, trail signage in this area is virtually non-existent, and great care needs to be taken to avoid getting lost.

The Gardiners Creek Trail continues north east, via a path on the north side of the Box Hill Golf Course, to the intersection of Canterbury and Middleborough Roads in Box Hill South. It then travels on a shared bicycle/footpath beside Middleborough Road past R.H.L. Sparks Reserve and ends at a pedestrian crossing near Albion Road. Across the road, a pedestrian path, which can be used by cyclists, continues east through the Blackburn Creeklands – through Blacks Walk, Kalang Park and Furness Park to Blackburn Road; the path is unsealed through this section so slower speeds are advised.

Across Blackburn Road riders can use either Alandale Road or Jeffrey Street to enter Blackburn Lake Sanctuary. North of here is Blackburn Station and Blackburn shopping centre.

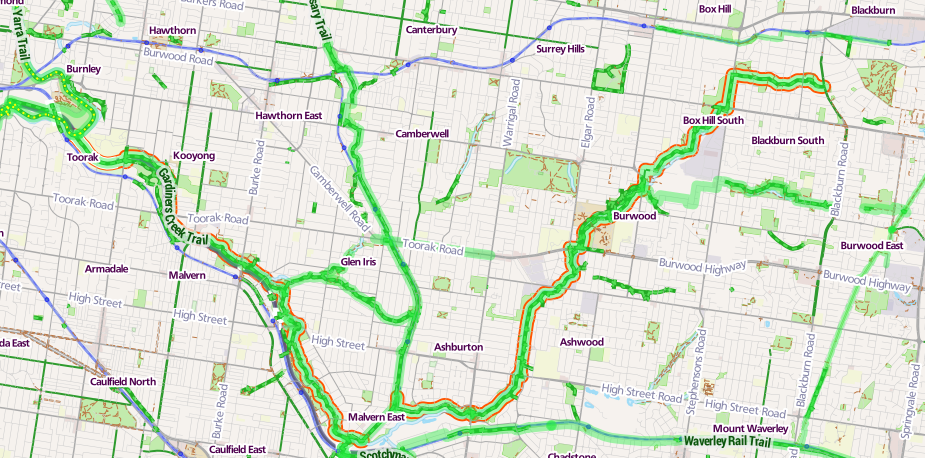

== Solway Street bridge ==
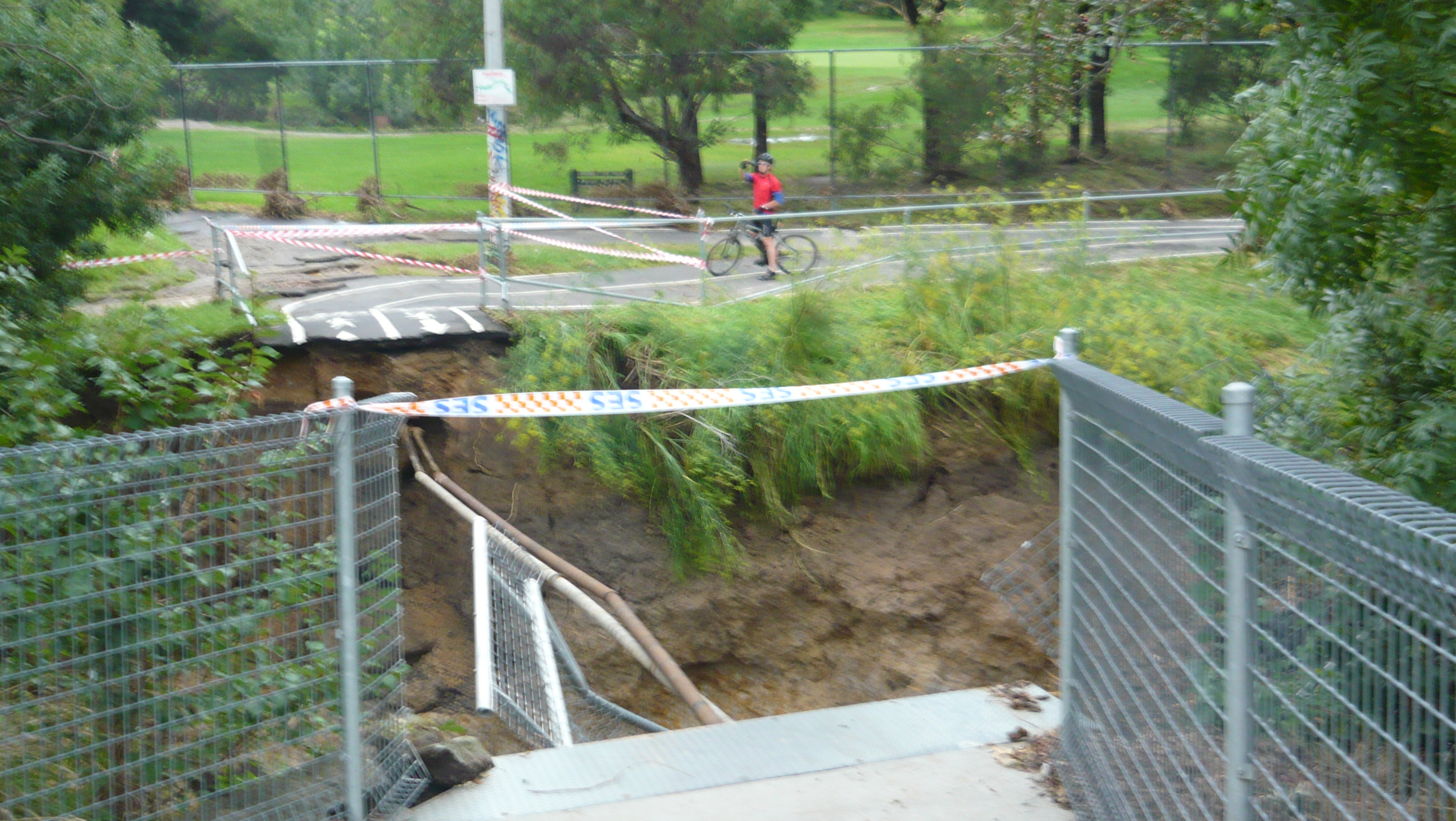
The Solway Street Bridge after it was swept away by flood waters

The old Solway Street footbridge was closed due to storm damage, sometime before April 2006. The bridge was shored up and reopened in June 2007, even though a replacement bridge had been proposed since at least 2003. As of April 2008 it remained just a proposal.

The old bridge was finally washed away by flood waters very early in the morning of 5 February 2011, after heavy rain resulting from the remnants of Tropical Cyclone Yasi, rendering the bridge impassable. During the later half of 2011 the bridge was completely replaced and was unofficially opened to the public on 22 December 2011.

== Connections ==
The westernmost end of the trail meets the Capital City Trail/Yarra River Trail at the Yarra River. Centrally it connects with the Anniversary Trail, which runs along the Alamein railway line and to the nearby Scotchmans Creek Trail and East Malvern Station to Centre Rd Trail at East Malvern Railway Station. At Warrigal Road it connects to the Waverley Rail Trail. Towards the easternmost end it meets the Wurundjeri Walk Trail in Blackburn South, and finally ends at the corner of Albion Road and Middleborough Road opposite Blacks Walk (part of the Blackburn Creeklands) in Blackburn.

The Ferndale Park Trail acts as a short cut to the Anniversary Trail.

The footbridge over the Monash Freeway was reopened on 20 August 2009.

Bicycle Victoria is campaigning for a connection between Winton Road and Warrigal Road, to complete the gap in the trail at this point. It is proposed that the path would continue along the creek parallel to the Malvern Public Golf Course, spanning the gap from Winton Road to Warrigal Road.

West end at 37.833995°S 145.023586°E. East end at 37.825950°S 145.137131°E.
