= Outer Circle Trail =

Rail trail and shared pathway in Melbourne, Australia

Anniversary Outer Circle Trail
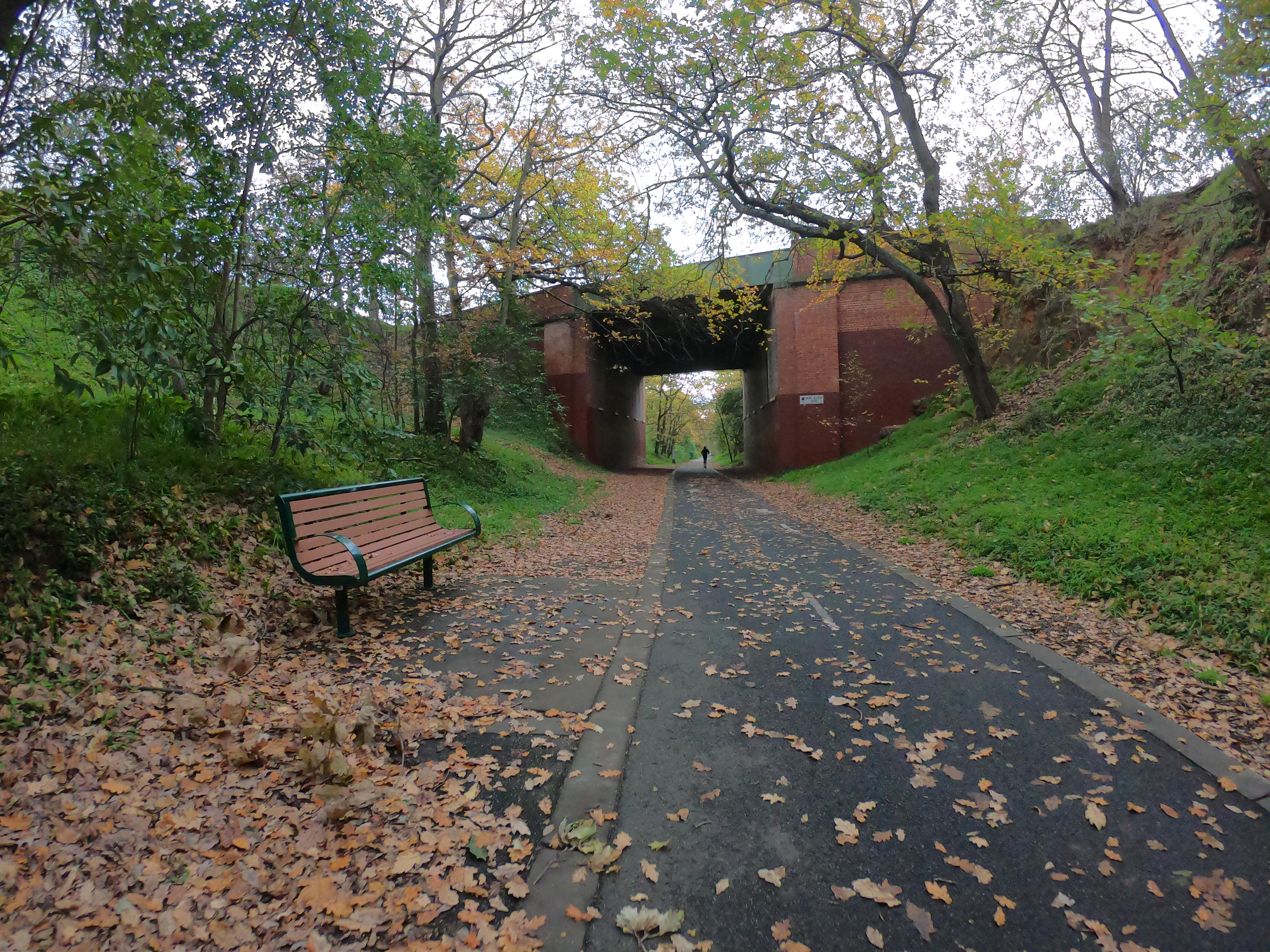
- Outer Circle Trail looking north toward Mont Albert Road Bridge
- Length: Approx 15.7 km
- Location: Melbourne, Victoria, Australia
- Difficulty: Easy to medium
- Hazards: High Street, Toorak Road and Princess Highway crossings
- Surface: Concrete or bitumen
- Hills: Various hills at Willsmere Park and near Ashburton Station otherwise fairly flat
- Water: Drinking fountains every 2 km (approx.)
- Trains: Alamein line (any station), East Camberwell Station and Hughesdale Station
- Trams: Route 109, Route 75, Route 70, Route 48
- Bus: Routes 612, 623, 624, 626, 822, 900, 546, 548, 200, 207, 302, 304, 350, 609
Trail map

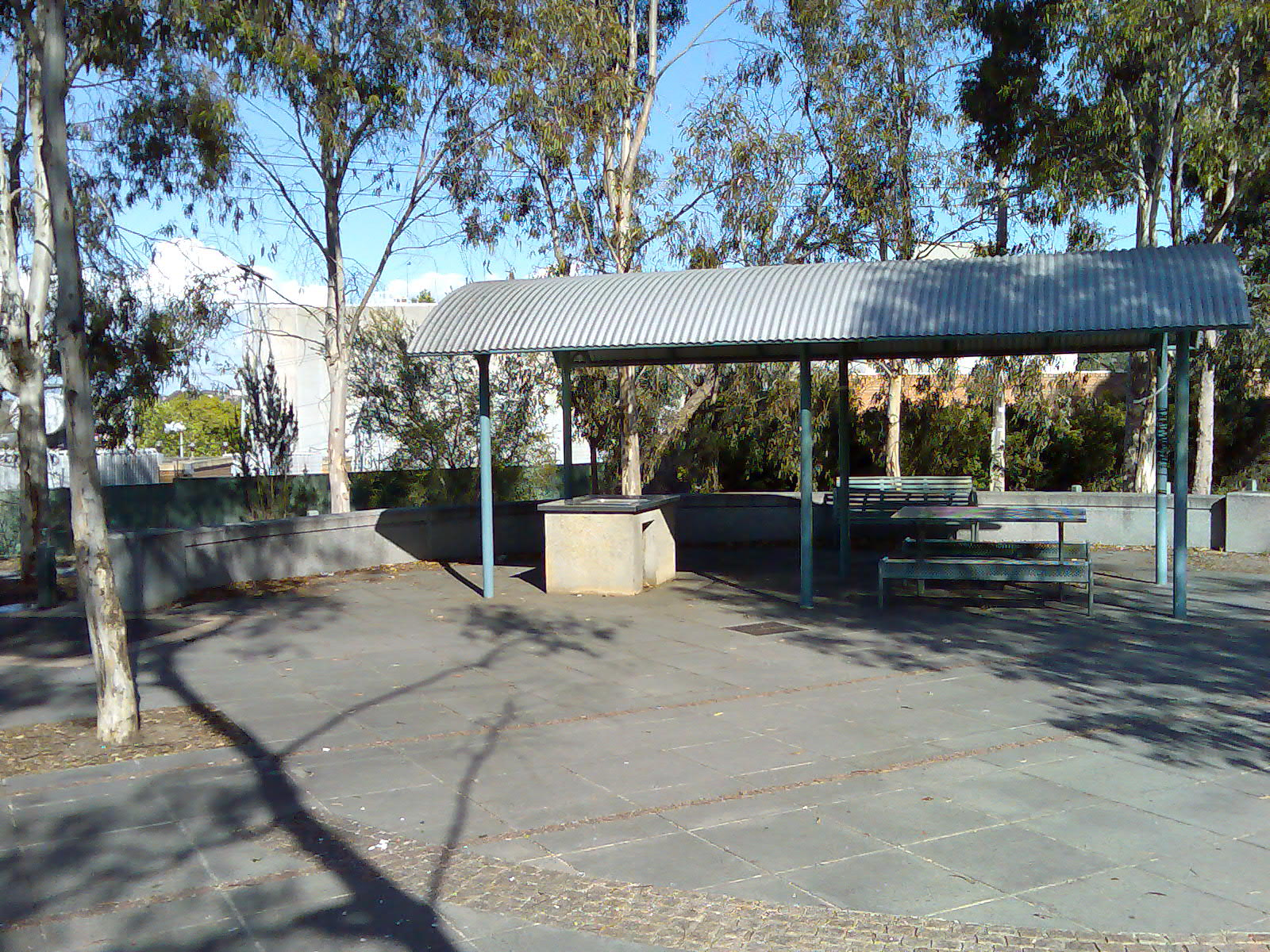
Barbecues are available for use at the park on Whitehorse Road, on the Outer Circle Trail.

The Outer Circle Trail, also known as the Anniversary Trail, is a shared use path for cyclists and pedestrians, which partly follows the Alamein line through the inner eastern suburbs of Melbourne, Victoria, Australia.

The trail follows the right-of-way of the old steam era Outer Circle Line. It runs from the Yarra River Trail near the Eastern Freeway at Fairfield to Hughesdale Station in the south. The Outer Circle train line opened in 1891. Parts of the trail were opened 100 years later in 1991, hence the name, "Anniversary".

It is frequently used by local residents and recreational cyclists, because of its proximity to other paths, many suburbs, and connecting transport. The path was upgraded in December 2006 and is now fully sealed and divided. The trail, in some sections, follows the direct line of the old railway; in others, it weaves through parks and follows the side of the Alamein Line. It then continues beyond Alamein Station, passing underneath the still-standing overhead wiring pylons, and then heading towards the Gardiners Creek Trail in Malvern East through to Hughesdale Train Station in the south.

== Route ==
At the very southern end of the trail users can access the Gardiners Creek Trail. Access is provided via the small footbridge at the south end of Solway Street. Due to flood damage the bridge was closed from April 2006 to June 2007. After being open for 3.5 years the bridge was washed away by flood waters very early in the morning of 5 February 2011, after heavy rain resulting from the remnants of Tropical Cyclone Yasi, rendering the bridge impassable. It was then rebuilt and opened in late 2011.

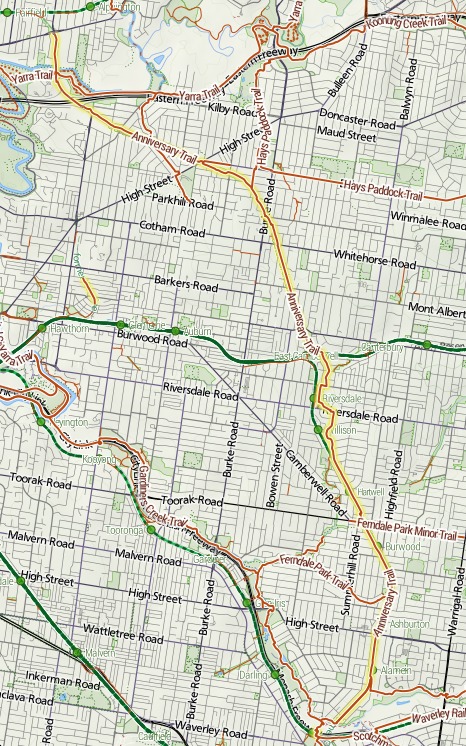
Map of the main trail from Fairfield Station to Gardiners Creek

== Facilities ==
The path is fully sealed, either bitumen or concrete, and busy road crossings are serviced by pedestrian traffic lights. At various locations along the path, there are barbecues (at the park adjacent to Whitehorse Road crossing and Frog Hollow Reserve). There are also frequent water fountains along the path. Many parks are dotted along the path, such as ovals, playgrounds, tennis courts and cricket pitches.

== Connections ==
- Yarra River Trail located in the north.
- The Ferndale Park Trail connects to the trail between Burwood and Ashburton Stations and acts as a shortcut to the Gardiners Creek Trail.
- A path from Alamein Station leads to Warrigal Rd via Markham Reserve.
- Gardiners Creek Trail and Scotchmans Creek Trail in the south.
- Djerring Trail at the southern end of the path.

== See also ==
- List of rail trails
