= Ferndale Park Trail =

- Length: 2.4km
- Location: Melbourne, Victoria, Australia
- Difficulty: Easy
- Hazards: Busy on weekends
- Surface: Gravel
- Hills: Steady incline from west to east
- Water: Drinking fountains in the middle and east end
- Train: Ashburton Station
- Bus: 612

The Ferndale Park Trail is a shared use path for cyclists and pedestrians in the suburb of Glen Iris, an inner eastern suburb of Melbourne, Victoria.

The path is useful as it provides a shortcut between Gardiners Creek Trail and Anniversary Trail. These two paths converge 2.5 km further to the south, so it can cut 2.6 km off a circuit utilising the Gardiners Creek Trail and the Anniversary Trail.

== Following the Path ==
The path effectively follows the route of the old Ashburton Creek, which is now completely barrel drained. The path meets Gardiners Creek Trail at Nettleton Park Reserve near a footbridge over the creek. Following the path is straight forward except at the west side of Glen Iris Rd where it splits in two. Take the south path, cross Glen Iris Rd and continue on the south side of Ferndale Park by the oval and toilet block. Continuing to the east, the trail meets the Alamein railway line 0.4 km north of Ashburton Station. The Anniversary Trail runs north south, parallel to the railway line.

== Connections ==
Connects to the Gardiners Creek Trail in the west and the Anniversary Trail in the east.

West end at 37.855172°S 145.059956°E. East end at 37.858616°S 145.082575°E.
