= The Glen Shopping Centre =

- Location: Glen Waverley, Victoria, Australia
- Coordinates: 37°52′35″S 145°9′54″E
- Opened: 1967; 59 years ago
- Manager: Vicinity Centres
- Owner: Vicinity Centres (50%); Perron Group (50%)
- Num. of stores: 250
- Num. of anchor tenants: 5
- Floor area: 78,776 m²
- Floors: 2 of stores and 5 of car parking
- Parking: 3,100
- Website: www.theglen.com.au

The Glen Shopping Centre is a major regional shopping centre located in Glen Waverley, Victoria, Australia.

== History ==
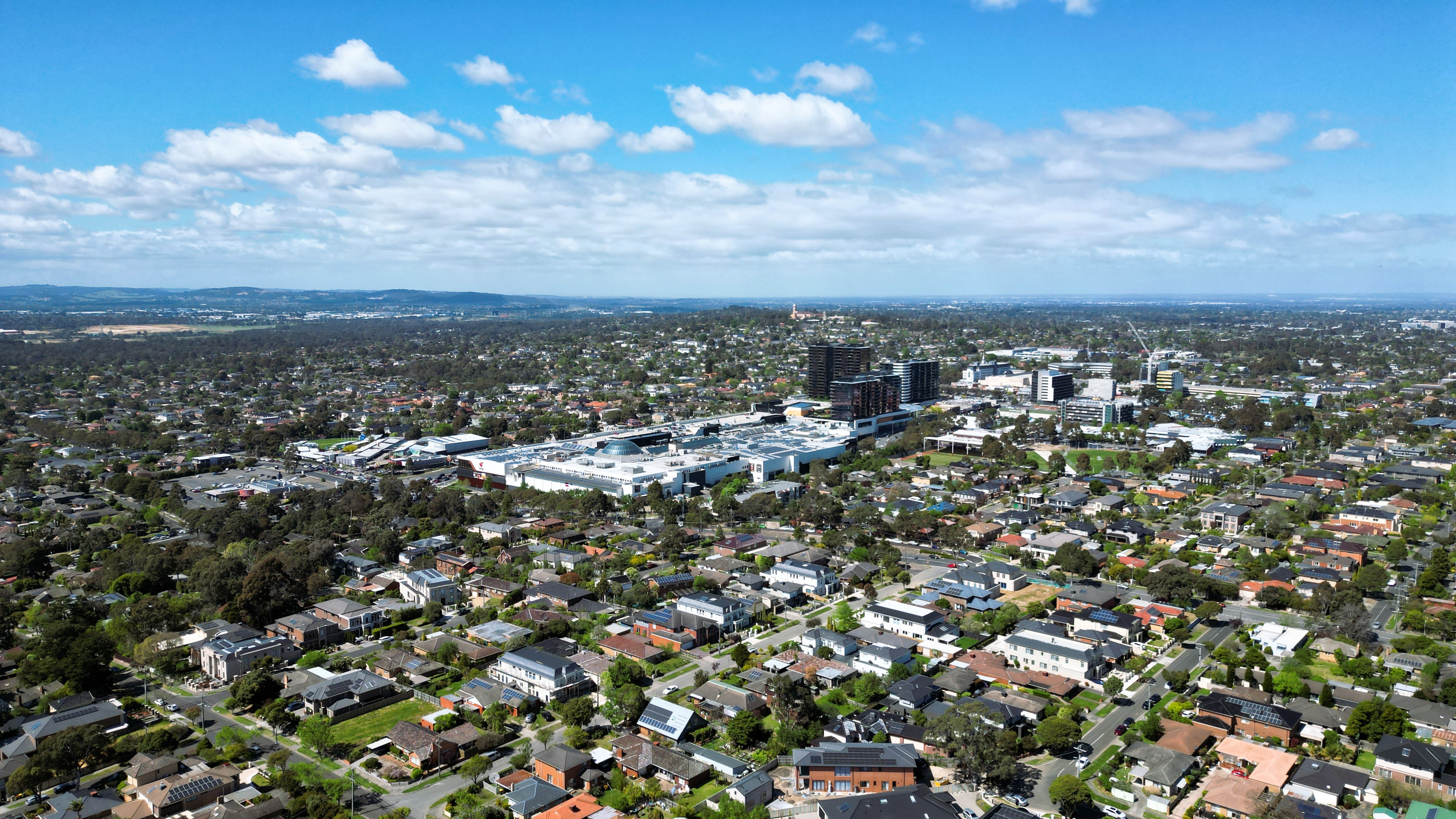
The Glen Shopping Centre and its outlook of the Dandenong Ranges in October 2023

The Glen first opened in 1967 with Woolworths, Lindsay's (which later became Target), and 30 specialty shops and 600 car parking spaces. It was owned by the Shell and BHP Superannuation Funds. In 1991, the centre expanded to 120 stores, including a Best & Less and 2,000 car parking spaces. In addition, a food court, multiple levels of undercover car parking and travelators were added. At this point, Centro Properties took over the management of the centre. In February 1994, Centro acquired a 50% interest in the centre at a cost of $37 million, with the two superannuation funds retaining 25% each; the Woolworths was redeveloped at this time.

A major expansion in 1996 costing $8 million saw the number of retailers expand to 170, including the opening of the first suburban David Jones store in Melbourne, with an official launch on 22 May 1996. In August 1999, a new consortium, Glen Property Trust in which Centro had a 50% interest, bought out the superannuation funds' stake in the centre at a price of $81.5 million, taking Centro's stake in the centre to 75%. In June 2000, Centro acquired the final 25% share.

== Redevelopment ==
In July 2015, the Council approved plans for a $500 million redevelopment of the centre including a new public square area, an expansion of the actual centre with 100 new speciality stores as well as three apartment towers.

On March 15, 2017, plans for the upgrade were unveiled. 100 speciality stores will be added (including local, national and international retailers), bringing the total number of stores at The Glen to over 240. A "next generation" David Jones store (similar to that of Eastland) will also open. The total area of the centre will increase to approximately 78,000 square metres of gross lettable area. The redevelopment was completed in 2020, taking part across 5 stages.

- Stage 1 officially opened on 19 October 2017 which featured the new fresh food market hall on the ground level. This update boasted a number of new or relocated retailers including a brand new Aldi, a new relocated Woolworths, and a Colonial Fresh fruit market as well as many more cafes and fresh food retailers.
- Stage 2 opened on 28 March 2018 which featured the new food gallery plus a number of new specialty stores. The new food court overlooks Springvale and High Street Roads and boasts great views of the Dandenong Ranges. It includes KFC, Schnitz, Sushi Jiro, Soul Origin, Nene Chicken, Healthy Habits, and a number of other food outlets that are new to Glen Waverley. This stage also included a brand new EB Games Australia store, Telstra Store, Shaver Shop and Australia Post.
- Stage 3 opened on 25 October 2018 which included the "fashion and lifestyle" precinct. This update introduced a number of local and international retailers to the area for the first time, including H&M and Uniqlo as well as 80 additional specialty retailers.
- Stage 4 opened on 1 August 2019 which included the "premium fashion" mall. This saw the inclusion of a new relocated David Jones store with the latest format as well as an additional 50 retailers, many which are new to the centre including Superdry, Surf Dive ‘n' Ski, Universal Store, Macpac, Seed Heritage, Fila, Kikki K, Platypus Shoes and Decjuba. A new dining precinct also opened up with a focus on bringing an "indoor-outdoor" dining experience to the area. It features more than 10 new restaurants including many growing food brands which are opening in a shopping centre or outside Melbourne’s inner city for the first time.
- Stage 5 opened progressively across late 2019 and early 2020 and featured a number of "mini major" stores including Spotlight Creative, TK Maxx and Daiso. In 2023, Chemist Warehouse and JB Hi-Fi opened in this area, with the latter relocating from its previous store on Level 1.

In November 2026, David Jones announced that it would close its store by the end of the 2026 holiday season.

== Tenants ==
=== Major ===
- Aldi
- Coles
- David Jones
- Target
- Woolworths

=== Mini Major ===
- Cotton On Mega
- H&M
- JB Hi-Fi
- TK Maxx
- Uniqlo
