= Wurundjeri Walk Trail =

Shared-use pathway in Victoria, Australia

- Length: 4.9 kilometres (3.0 mi)
- Location: Melbourne, Victoria, Australia
- Difficulty: Easy
- Hazards: Missing sections of trail require navigating back streets.
- Train: None

The Wurundjeri Walk Trail is a shared use path for cyclists and pedestrians in the inner eastern suburbs of Blackburn South and Forest Hill in Melbourne, Victoria, Australia.

The path is broken by many small road sections. For this entry, the eastern end is considered to be Mahoneys Road that leads to Forest Hill Chase.

== Following the trail ==
The west end of Wurundjeri Walk Trail starts at Boardman Close, near the clubhouse of the Box Hill golf club. See the Gardiners Creek Trail for more detail. 200 metres (660 ft) from Boardman Close the path ducks down a small lane and arrives at Roberts Avenue. Turn left (north) then right into Wellard Road (east). Right at Nash Road, left at Joyhill Avenue, left again at Penrose Street, right into Mirabella Crescent and finally left into Middleborough Road. Go 130 metres (430 ft) north up Middleborough Road to the pedestrian crossing and cross over to Wilks Place. The trail restarts at the end of the street.

Follow the Wurundjeri Walk until the trail arrives at a tee intersection. Turn right (south) and head for Fulton Road. Go left (east) and along Fulton Road and cross over to the path that links to Finch Place. Continuing east along Finch Place, cross Blackburn Road, then Forest Glen Avenue to the parks parallel to Golden Glen Road and finally arriving at Mahoneys Road. Cross the road and go along Parkland Place, north of and beside "Brand Receptions". The path intersects here with the Syndal Heatherdale Pipe Reserve Trail.

== Connections ==
Gardiners Creek Trail in the west. In the east, at Mahoneys Road, the Syndal Heatherdale Pipe Reserve Trail can be reached by a via Parkland Place.

West end at 37.841005°S 145.120981°E; east end at 37.844428°S 145.166243°E.
