= Scotchmans Creek Trail =

Shared use path in Melbourne, Australia

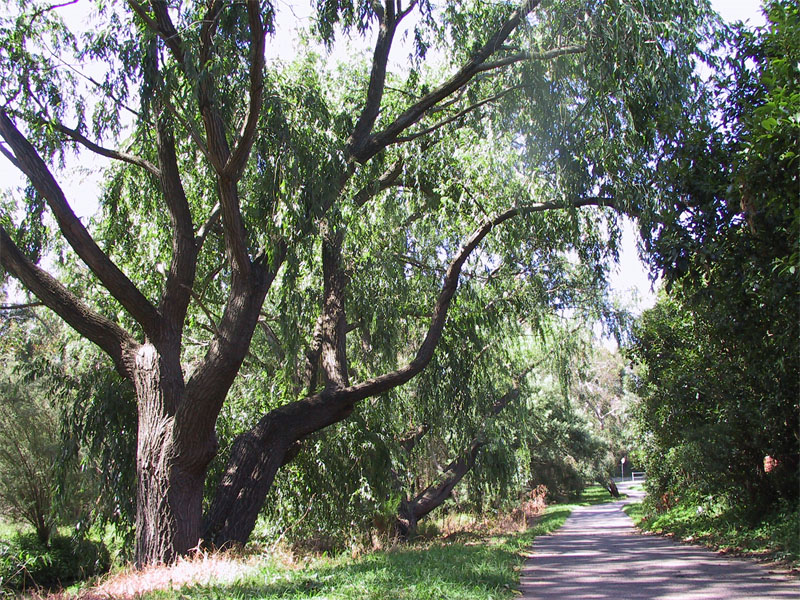
- Adjacent to Regent Street, Mount Waverley
- Length: Approx 16.5 km
- Location: Melbourne, Victoria, Australia
- Difficulty: Mostly easy
- Hazards: Missing sections of trail require navigating back streets. Freeway underpass may flood after heavy rain. No proper crossing on some major roads.
- Surface: Shared use (concrete and asphalt) and residential streets
- Hills: Mostly flat except for a hill at the Wheelers Hill end
- Water: Occasional water fountains
- Train: Glen Waverley line (East Malvern)
- Tram: Route 3 terminates close to East Malvern station
- Bus: Numerous routes including 903, 623, 703, 624, 733, 737, 742, 753, 767, 850, and 885.

The Scotchmans Creek Trail is a shared use path for cyclists and pedestrians, which follows Scotchmans Creek through the eastern suburbs of Melbourne, Victoria, Australia.

It runs from East Malvern railway station through to Jells Park although several sections consist of normal residential streets. The trail provides good access to Chadstone Shopping Centre and Holmesglen Institute of TAFE for the local community. The trail passes through Valley Reserve in Mount Waverley, which is one of the last remaining stands of indigenous vegetation in the local area.

Although Scotchmans Creek Trail is widely recognized as ending in the west at East Malvern Railway Station, some sources have the trail's west end at Warrigal Rd.

The signage on the trail at this point is confusing as two separate routes are signed. One route is via Scotchmans Creek and the other route is via the Pinewood Shopping Centre. Strangely, both routes are signed as the Scotchmans Creek Trail and no indication is given, as to which is the one to use, and why.

== Following the Path ==
The trail begins in the west at East Malvern Railway Station where it runs alongside the Monash Freeway until it meets Warrigal Road. An overpass takes it to Scotchmans Creek where it continues along the Scotchmans Creek Linear Reserve until it reaches Park Rd. It passes to the north of the Oakleigh Recreation Centre and onwards to Huntingdale Rd where pedestrian lights allow safe crossing. It runs past the Huntingdale Wetlands and crosses Stanley Ave (and crosses to the north bank of Scotchmans Creek), before going through a tunnel under the Monash Freeway and then under Stephensons Rd. After crossing Forster Rd, the path continues to Waverley Rd near Anthony Drive. Previously identified as a "missing link", this section was opened in October 2013, and may be prone to flooding. The alternate route is via Rhonda St and Anthony Drive (see map of the route to take). At Anthony Drive, the trail crosses Waverley road at the east end of traffic island, and continues north-eastward. There is a sign-posted turn off leading to Valley Reserve. The shared pedestrian-bicycle path crosses Blackburn Rd via a footbridge. and finally ends at Waverley Rd near the Homesglen Institute of TAFE, with most of the remaining journey to Jells Park being on residential streets.

After crossing Waverley Rd, the trail turns down Ivanhoe St and follows the path eastwards to Winmalee Drive. It turns down Koonalda Ave and crosses over Springvale Rd at the pedestrian lights (see map of the route). A road section at Whites Lane leads to a tennis club. The trail leaves the road for the path at this point, this turn-off being noted for being very easy for users to miss. The path continues to Belvedere Ave, Mackintosh Rd and Lum Rd.

There are two options for cyclists after Lum Rd: to go down either Strickland Dr and Clarke Ct, or to go down Tom Begg Ct. The trail is steep here as it descends into the Dandenong Valley. A short laneway at the end of each court leads to Sunnybrook Drive. The final section of the path continues to Jells Park (see map of the route to take).

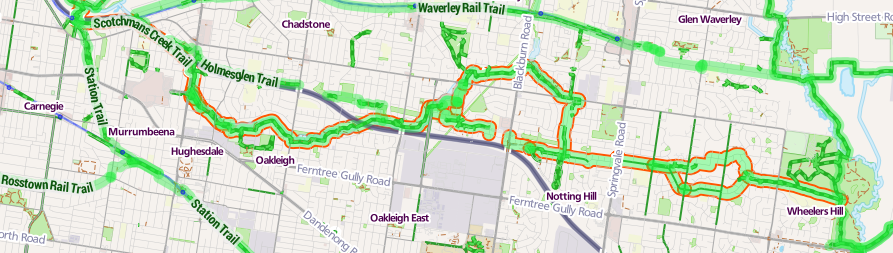
Map of the trail

== Connections ==
- The Scotchmans Creek Trail connects at the west end to the Gardiners Creek Trail and the Outer Circle Trail and connects East Malvern Station to Centre Rd Trail.
- The Waverley Rail Trail can be reached via Argyll St (1 km). At Waverley Rd pass under the highway using the path that leads to Golfers Drive. Heading towards the public golf course, the path resumes on the right. Descending down the path then leads to Argyll St. Travel east to the far end of Argyll St. At Holmesglen railway station use the pedestrian bridge to cross Warrigal Road arriving at the Waverley Rail Trail.
- At the east end at Jells Park it links to the Dandenong Creek Trail and the EastLink Trail. The Blind Creek Trail also terminates near the north end of Jells Park.
- A short road section (Blackburn Rd, Falconer St & Fiander Ave) leads to Syndal station. On the north side of the station, in Shirley Ave, is the southern end of the Syndal Heatherdale Pipe Reserve Trail.

Note the footbridge over the Monash Freeway was reopened on 20 August 2009.

In 2022, Monash City Council announced the planned construction of a protected bicycle link between the trail and the Djerring Trail. The connection would start where the trail crosses Atkinson Street, and end where the Djerring Trail and Oxford Street meet.

West end at 37.872810°S 145.068955°E. East end at 37.901598°S 145.201331°E.
