= Strike Bowling Bar =

Australian privately owned bowling chain

- Industry: Leisure and Entertainment Attraction Operator
- Founded: 2002; 24 years ago
- Headquarters: Abbotsford, Victoria, Australia
- Key people: Michael Schreiber (Founder & CEO)
- Owner: Funlab Pty Ltd
- Website: www.strikebowling.com.au

Strike Bowling Bar is an Australian company that owns and operates over 20 venues across the country. Strike Bowling is amongst the largest bowling chains in Australia.

Along with Strike Bowling Bar, Funlab owns the Australian division of Sky Zone Trampoline Park, Holey Moley Golf Club, and Archie Brothers Cirque Electriq, all established by Michael Schreiber.

Strike Bowling Bar is known for its vaporwave aesthetics.

== Publicity ==
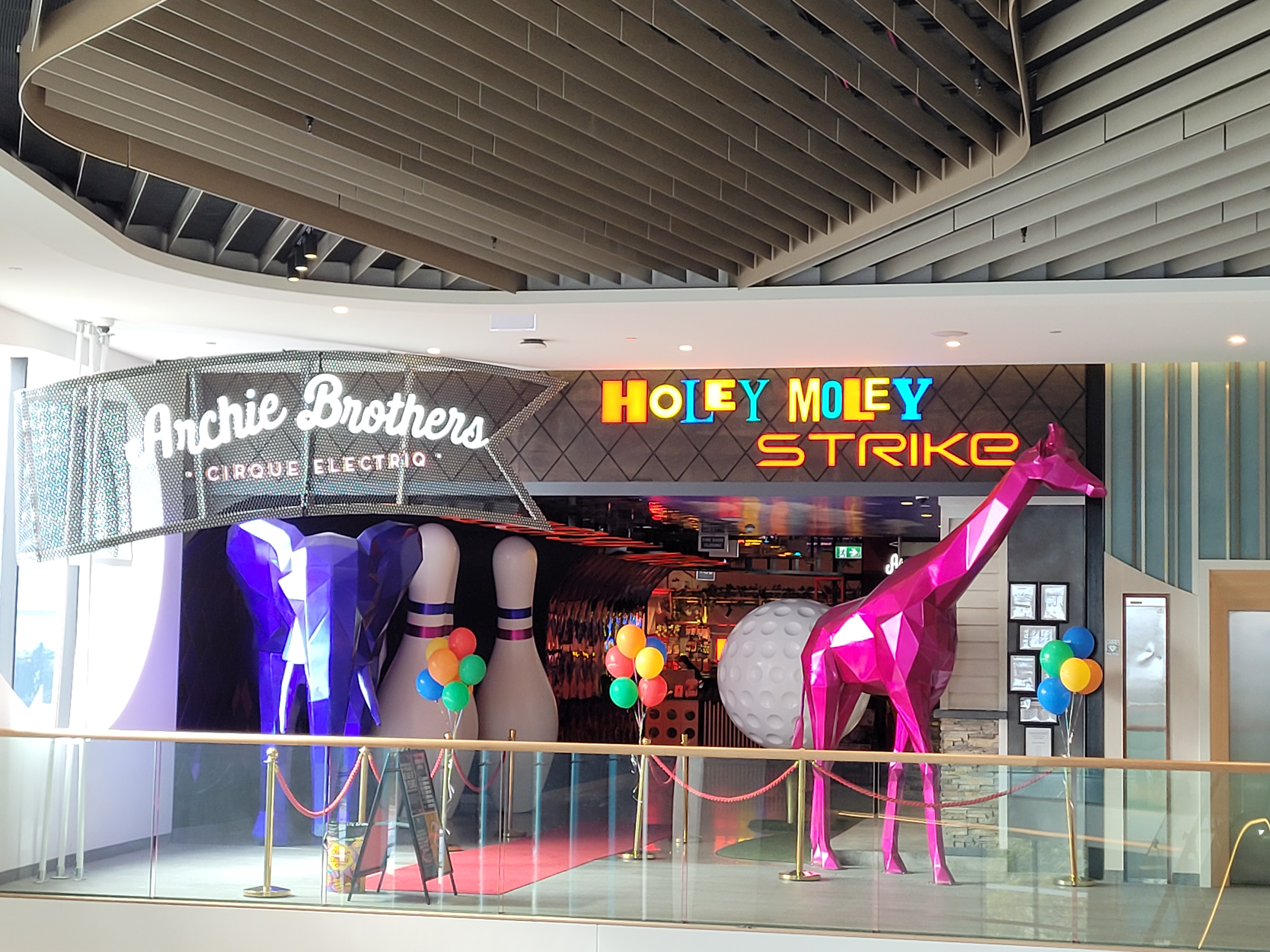
A Strike, Holey Moley, and Archie Brothers complex at Karrinyup Shopping Centre

=== QV2.0 unveiling and launch of Casino Heist Escape Room ===
In October 2015, Strike threw a launch party for the grand unveiling of QV2.0 and launch of Casino Heist Escape Room, this included a live appearance from The Potbelleez.

=== Fitzy & Wippa's 'Strike from Work' Strike party ===
On 6 June 2013, Strike Bowling Bar collaborated with radio hosts Fitzy and Wippa from Nova 96.9 to host a Strike Party.

=== Live on the Lane ===
In June 2011, Strike launched 'Live on the Lane' at Strike King Street Wharf, Sydney, with Bag Raiders headlining the event and DJs, Alison Wonderland and Homophobics as supporting acts.
