= Monash railway station =

Proposed railway station in Melbourne, Australia

Monash

General information
- Location: Normanby and Howleys Roads, Notting Hill, Victoria; Australia
- Coordinates: 37°54′18″S 145°08′17″E
- System: PTV rapid transit station
- Owner: VicTrack
- Operator: TransitLinX
- Line: Suburban Rail Loop East
- Platforms: 2
- Tracks: 2
- Connections: Bus

Construction
- Structure type: Underground
- Depth: 23 metres (75 ft)
- Platform levels: 2
- Accessible: Yes

Other information
- Status: Under construction

History
- Opened: 2035 (planned)

Services
| Preceding station | Metro Trains | Following station |
Future services
| Clayton towards Southland | Suburban Rail Loop East (under construction) | Glen Waverley towards Box Hill |
Track layout
Location

Monash station is a rapid transit railway station currently under construction on the Suburban Rail Loop East line in Melbourne, Victoria. It is scheduled to open in 2035 and will serve Monash University, CSIRO and Notting Hill.

== History ==
For many years, the Monash precinct has been recognised as lacking adequate public transport, prompting a series of proposals aimed at improving connectivity. The earliest formal plan for the Rowville rail line can be traced to the 1969 Melbourne Transportation Plan, which outlined a heavy rail extension from Huntingdale to Ferntree Gully, passing through the university then towards Rowville. However, because the corridor was never fully reserved, subsequent construction became increasingly challenging as urban development intensified.

Over the decades, various feasibility studies have examined potential alignments, station locations, and integration with the existing network. The most comprehensive of these such as one in 2012, identified the Huntingdale–Rowville corridor as the preferred route, serving both Monash University and the Mulgrave employment area. However, the studies also highlighted the need for substantial upgrades to the Dandenong corridor to accommodate additional train services.

In 2018, the Federal Government allocated $475 million towards a rail link via Monash University from Huntingdale, while the Victorian Government proposed a conventional tram line from Caulfield to Rowville, via Chadstone and Monash University Clayton, aimed at creating a direct, high-capacity connection for Melbourne's south-east. However, this tram option was estimated to cost $2.9 billion and would require at least two more years to deliver compared to other alternatives. Despite these funding commitments, the project has not advanced beyond the planning phase, in part due to ongoing debate over the merits of heavy rail versus light rail or tram solutions.

From 2021 to 2023, Monash University and Vicinity Centres shifted their focus to the Caulfield-Rowville Trackless Rapid Transit (TRT) proposal. This $1.4–$1.45 billion initiative features high-capacity, electric, trackless tram vehicles operating on dedicated lanes along a 19 km route from Caulfield to Rowville, via Chadstone and Monash University Clayton.

The university was finally confirmed to receive a dedicated train station with the announcement of the Suburban Rail Loop (SRL) in 2018. The SRL is a 90-kilometre orbital rail line designed to connect Melbourne's major suburban centres, including a new underground station at Monash as part of the SRL East section towards Box Hill or Southland in Cheltenham. Construction activities for the Monash SRL station began in 2024.

== Transport links ==
Bus connections:

- 742 : Ringwood station to Chadstone Shopping Centre
