= Clayton railway station, Melbourne =

Railway station in Melbourne, Australia

Clayton
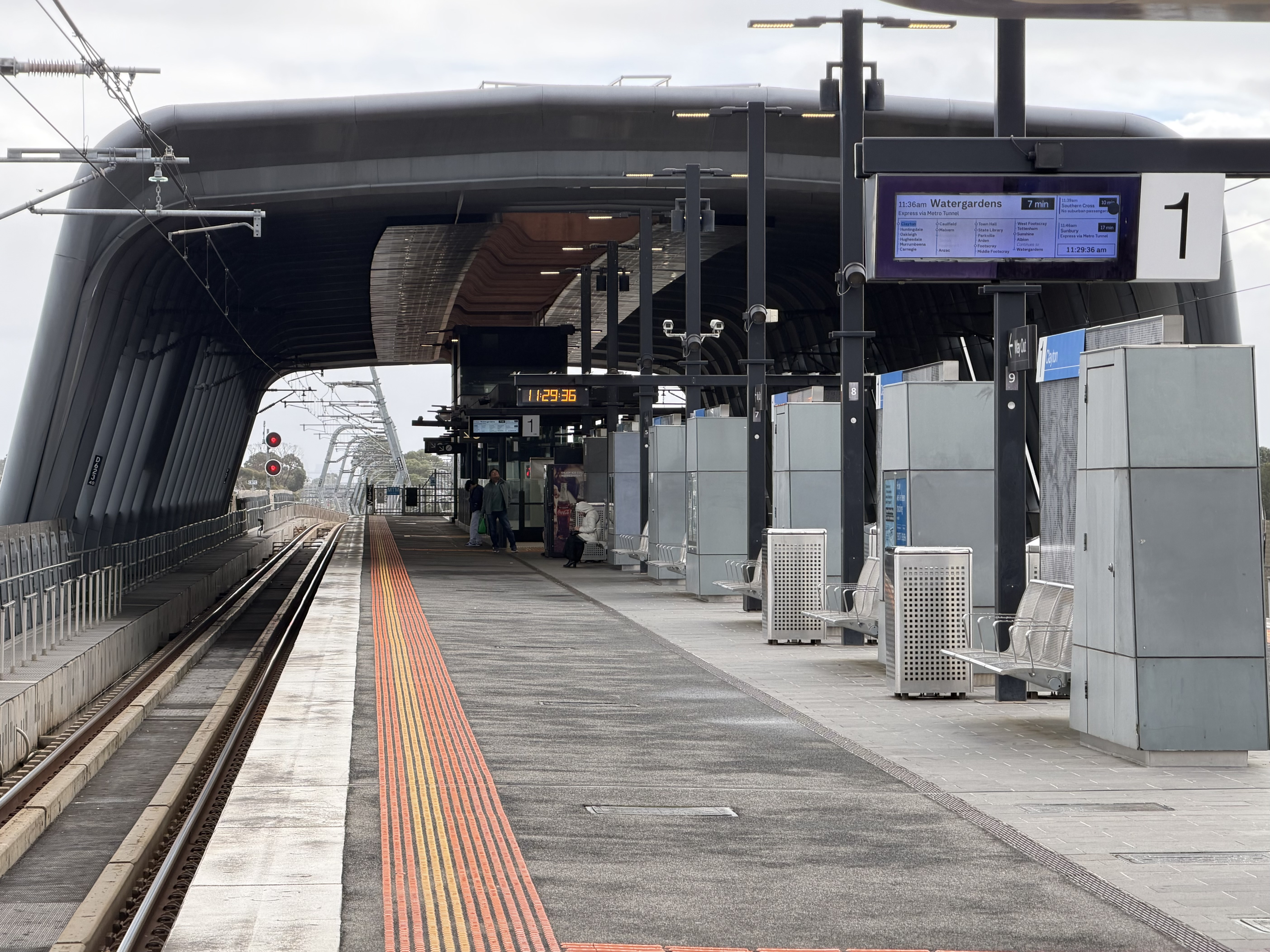
- North-west bound view from Platform 1, June 2026

General information
- Location: 274 Clayton Road, Clayton, City of Monash, Victoria 3168; Australia
- Coordinates: 37°55′28″S 145°07′12″E
- System: PTV commuter and regional rail station
- Owner: VicTrack
- Operator: Metro Trains
- Lines: Cranbourne Pakenham; Gippsland
- Distance: 20.51 km (12.74 mi) from Southern Cross
- Platforms: 2 (1 island)
- Tracks: 2
- Train operators: Metro Trains; V/Line
- Connections: Bus

Construction
- Structure type: Elevated
- Parking: 260 spaces
- Cycle facilities: 12 racks
- Accessible: Yes—step free access

Other information
- Status: Operational, premium station
- Station code: CLA
- Fare zone: Myki zone 2
- Website: Public Transport Victoria

History
- Opened: 6 January 1880; 146 years ago
- Rebuilt: 16 April 2018 (LXRP)
- Electrified: December 1922 (1500 V DC overhead)
- Former names: Clayton's Road (1880–1891)

Passengers
- 2005–2006: 1,047,064
- 2006–2007: 1,185,964 ▲13.26%
- 2007–2008: 1,373,910 ▲15.85%
- 2008–2009: 1,720,328 ▲25.21%
- 2009–2010: 1,749,175 ▲1.67%
- 2010–2011: 1,711,528 ▼2.15%
- 2011–2012: 1,721,420 ▲0.57%
- 2012–2013: Not measured
- 2013–2014: 1,495,192 ▼13.14%
- 2014–2015: 1,618,549 ▲8.25%
- 2015–2016: 1,944,934 ▲20.16%
- 2016–2017: 1,803,536 ▼7.27%
- 2017–2018: 1,432,893 ▼20.55%
- 2018–2019: 1,612,702 ▲12.54%
- 2019–2020: 1,388,700 ▼13.89%
- 2020–2021: 796,650 ▼42.63%
- 2021–2022: 853,500 ▲7.13%
- 2022–2023: 1,209,900 ▲41.76%
- 2023–2024: 1,535,450 ▲26.91%
- 2024–2025: 1,514,000 ▼1.4%

Services
Preceding station	Metro Trains	Following station
Huntingdale towards Watergardens or Sunbury via Metro Tunnel	Cranbourne line	Westall towards Cranbourne or East Pakenham
Huntingdale towards Watergardens or Sunbury via Metro Tunnel	Pakenham line	Westall towards Cranbourne or East Pakenham
Preceding station	V/Line	Following station
Caulfield towards Southern Cross	Gippsland line	Dandenong towards Traralgon or Bairnsdale
Future services
Preceding station	Metro Trains	Following station
Southland Terminus	Suburban Rail Loop East (under construction)	Monash towards Box Hill

Victorian Heritage Register
- Official name: Clayton Railway Station
- Criteria: C, D, E
- Designated: 20 August 1982
- Reference no.: H1667
- Heritage overlay no.: HO13
- Category: Transport - Rail
Track layout
Location

The Clayton railway station is a premium railway station operated by Metro Trains Melbourne and V/Line on the Cranbourne and Pakenham lines, both part of the Melbourne rail network. The station serves Clayton, a south-eastern suburb of Melbourne, in Victoria, Australia. In addition to the Metro line, the Gippsland line—part of the Victorian regional railway network—is accessible from the station and eight bus routes, including SmartBus route 703.

The station opened on 6 January 1880 as "Clayton's Road"; and received its current name in 1890. The station is approximately 17 kilometres (11 mi) from Flinders Street, or about 33 minutes by train. Initially at grade, a new elevated station was rebuilt and reopened in 2018 as part of the Level Crossing Removal Project.

Elements of the station completed in 1880 and its structures from 1891 to 1915 were added to the Victorian Heritage Register on 20 August 1982 in recognition of their architectural, aesthetic, social and historical importance. The 2018 redevelopment project, completed in a contemporary style, received numerous architectural awards.

== Description ==
Clayton railway station is located in the suburb of Clayton. On the north side of the station is Carnish Road, and Clayton Road is to the west. The station is owned by VicTrack and is operated by Metro Trains Melbourne. The station is approximately 17 kilometres (11 mi), or a 33 minute train ride away, from Flinders Street.

Clayton station consists of a single island platform which is elevated above the road, and is connected to Clayton Road by escalators, lifts and a staircase. The length of the platform is approximately 160 metres (520 ft), long enough for a Metro Trains seven-car HCMT.

The main car park at the station is located in between both Haughton Road and Carnish Road, south of the station. The station complies with the Disability Discrimination Act, 1992, as there is a lift that connects the station entrance with Platforms 1 and 2.

== History ==
Clayton station opened two years after the line from Oakleigh was extended to Dandenong. The station was originally called Clayton's Road, receiving its current name in 1890. The station, like the suburb itself, gets its name from the property Clayton Vale, owned by John Clayton in the 1860s and 1870s, which was located near the station.

In 1971, boom barriers replaced interlocked gates at the former Clayton Road level crossing, which was located at the up end of the station.

In 1998, Clayton was upgraded to a premium station and staffed from early in the morning until the last train.

=== Heritage buildings ===
Two timber station buildings, listed on the Victorian Heritage Register, were constructed in 1891, with one on each platform. The modular design of the buildings, which included a booking office, a general waiting area, and a ladies waiting room is relatively unique and spartan, completed in the 'Ringwood style'. The ticket office at the beginning of platform 1 was constructed in c. 1915. When the elevated station was constructed, the old station building on platform 2 was relocated and protected due to its historical status. It now contains an archival photographic record of the station.

=== Level crossing removal ===
In March 2014, the Victorian government announced a grade separation project to replace the Clayton Road level crossing, as well as the Centre Road level crossing, located nearby in the down direction of the station. That necessitated the rebuilding of the station. In 2016, the Andrews government announced that, as part of the Level Crossing Removal Project (LXRP), 8.3 kilometres (5.2 mi) of elevated rail would be provided, removing nine level crossings on the Pakenham and Cranbourne rail corridor, including the building of five new elevated stations at Carnegie, Murrumbeena, Hughesdale, Noble Park and Clayton.

Dubbed "sky rail" by opponents and some media outlets, the plans for an elevated railway spurred significant local opposition due to concerns over visual and noise impacts. The project was a political issue in the 2018 state election.

In April 2018, the elevated Clayton station was opened, along with the four other elevated stations on the Caulfield to Dandenong line. The level crossing removals created a 22.5-hectare (56-acre) new section of open parkland, dubbed a "linear park", that created open space, sports courts, playgrounds, walking and cycling trails, and expanded station forecourts. As part of the project, the Djerring Trail was created, a 17-kilometre (11 mi) shared-use path along the rail corridor, which runs through the Clayton station precinct. In the year after the elevated rail opened in 2018, the media reported that many residents, including some who were opposed to the project, were happy with the outcome and utilised the new open space.

== Platforms and services ==
Clayton is an elevated premium station, consisting of an island platform connected to the station concourse on Clayton Road via escalators, lifts and a staircase. The station is served by both Pakenham and Cranbourne line trains, and is also served by V/Line trains on the Gippsland line.

Services to East Pakenham and Cranbourne travel together south-east towards Dandenong before splitting into two separate lines. Services to the city run express from Malvern to Anzac, before stopping all stations to Sunbury via the Metro Tunnel. Traralgon and Bairnsdale services run express to Nar Nar Goon, stopping at Dandenong and Pakenham, before stopping all stations after Nar Nar Goon. From Clayton regional services to the city run express to Richmond, stopping at Caulfield, before stopping all stations to Southern Cross.

=== Metropolitan ===
Clayton platform arrangement
Platform	Line	Destination	Via	Service Type	Source
1	Cranbourne line Pakenham line	Sunbury, Watergardens or West Footscray	Town Hall	Limited express	
2	Cranbourne line Pakenham line	East Pakenham, Cranbourne or Westall		All stations	

=== Regional ===
Clayton platform arrangement
Platform	Line	Destination	Via	Notes
1	Gippsland line	Southern Cross	Flinders Street	Set down only
2	Gippsland line	Traralgon or Bairnsdale		Pick up only

== Transport links ==
Clayton is served by eight bus routes, including SmartBus route 703. Routes 704, 821, 824, 978, 979 and northbound services on routes 631, 703 and 733 depart from the interchange on Carinish Road, whereas southbound services on route 631, 703 and 733 depart from the bus stop on Clayton Road.

=== Carinish Road ===
- 631 : to Waverley Gardens Shopping Centre
- SmartBus 703 : to Blackburn station
- 704 : Oakleigh station – Westall station
- 733 : to Box Hill station
- 821 : to Westfield Southland
- 824 : Moorabbin station – Parkmore Shopping Centre
- Night Bus 978 : to Dandenong station (via Mulgrave) (Saturday and Sunday mornings only)
- Night Bus 979 : to Dandenong station (via Keysborough) (Saturday and Sunday mornings only)

=== Clayton Road ===
- 631 : to Westfield Southland
- SmartBus 703 : to Middle Brighton station
- 733 : to Oakleigh station

=== Suburban Rail Loop ===
In 2018, Clayton station was chosen as one of the stations to be served by the proposed Suburban Rail Loop. As part of the project, the station will receive a major upgrade, which will involve construction of two new underground platforms, as well as the conversion of the station to a transport superhub. In June 2022, construction began south of the existing station, tunnelling began in 2026, and the eastern section of the SRL (SRL East) is planned to open in 2035. A direct paid-area connection between the new underground station and elevated platforms is planned to be built between the elevated rail tracks.

- Suburban Rail Loop East services to Southland and Box Hill

== Gallery ==
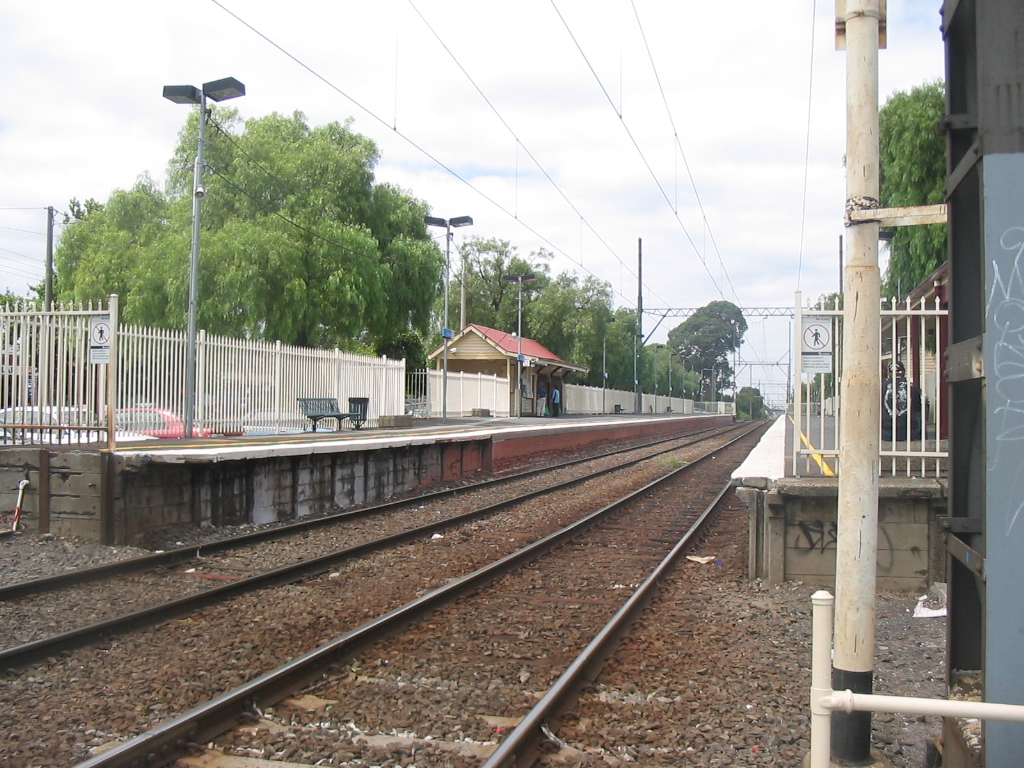
Westbound view of both former ground-level platforms, 2006

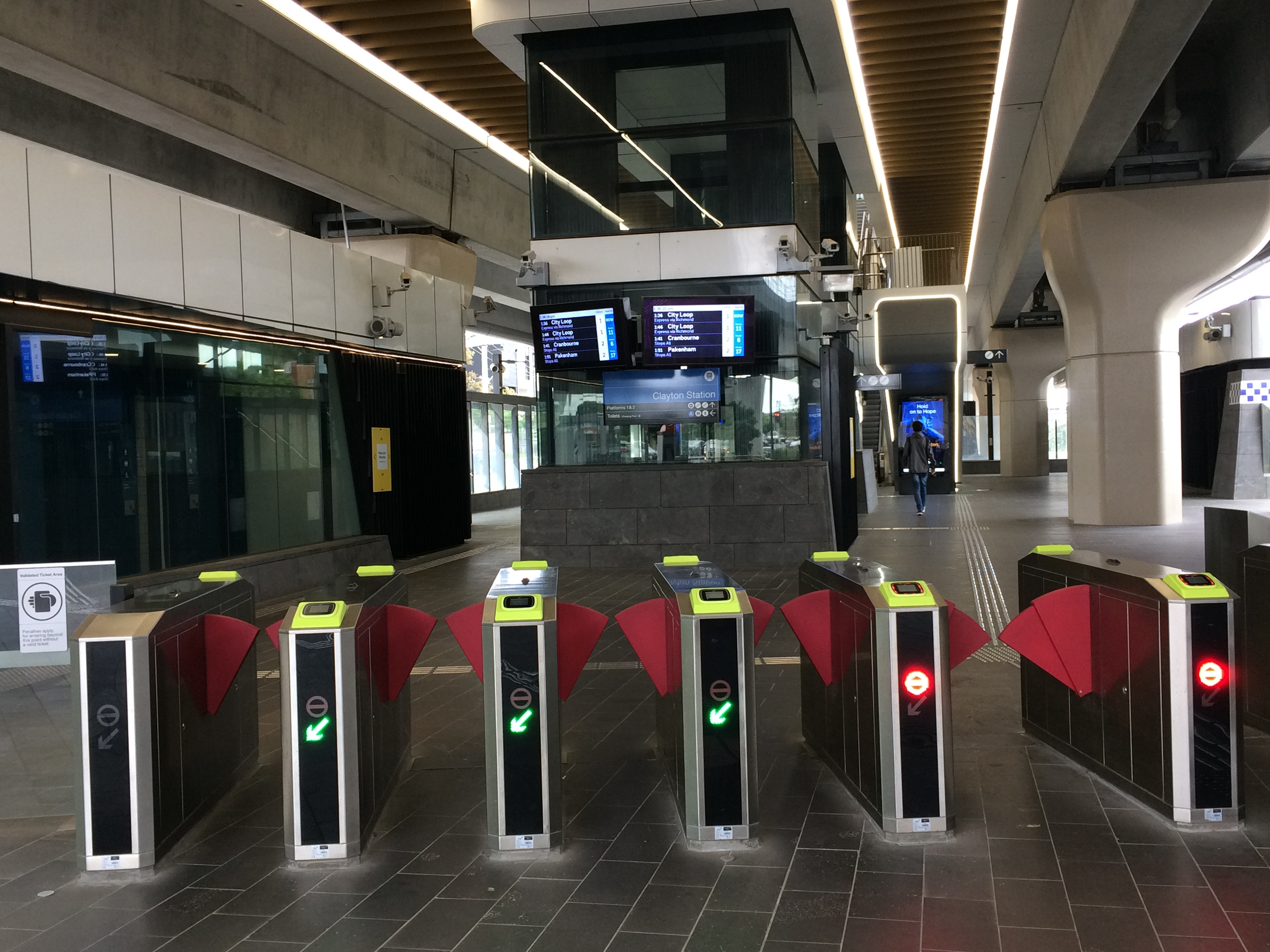
Main entrance to the station, located on Clayton Road

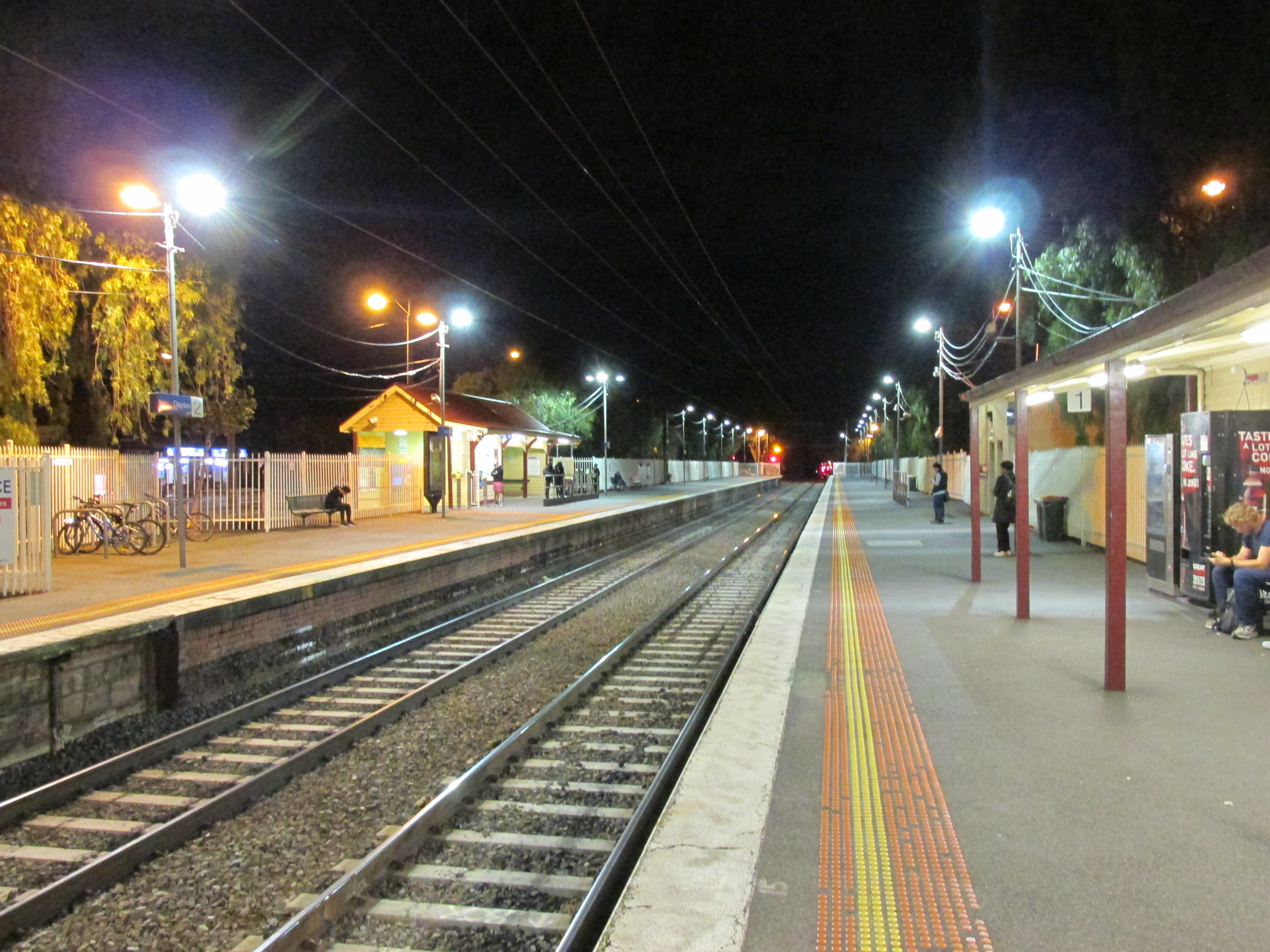
North-west-bound view from the former ground level Platform 1, 2015

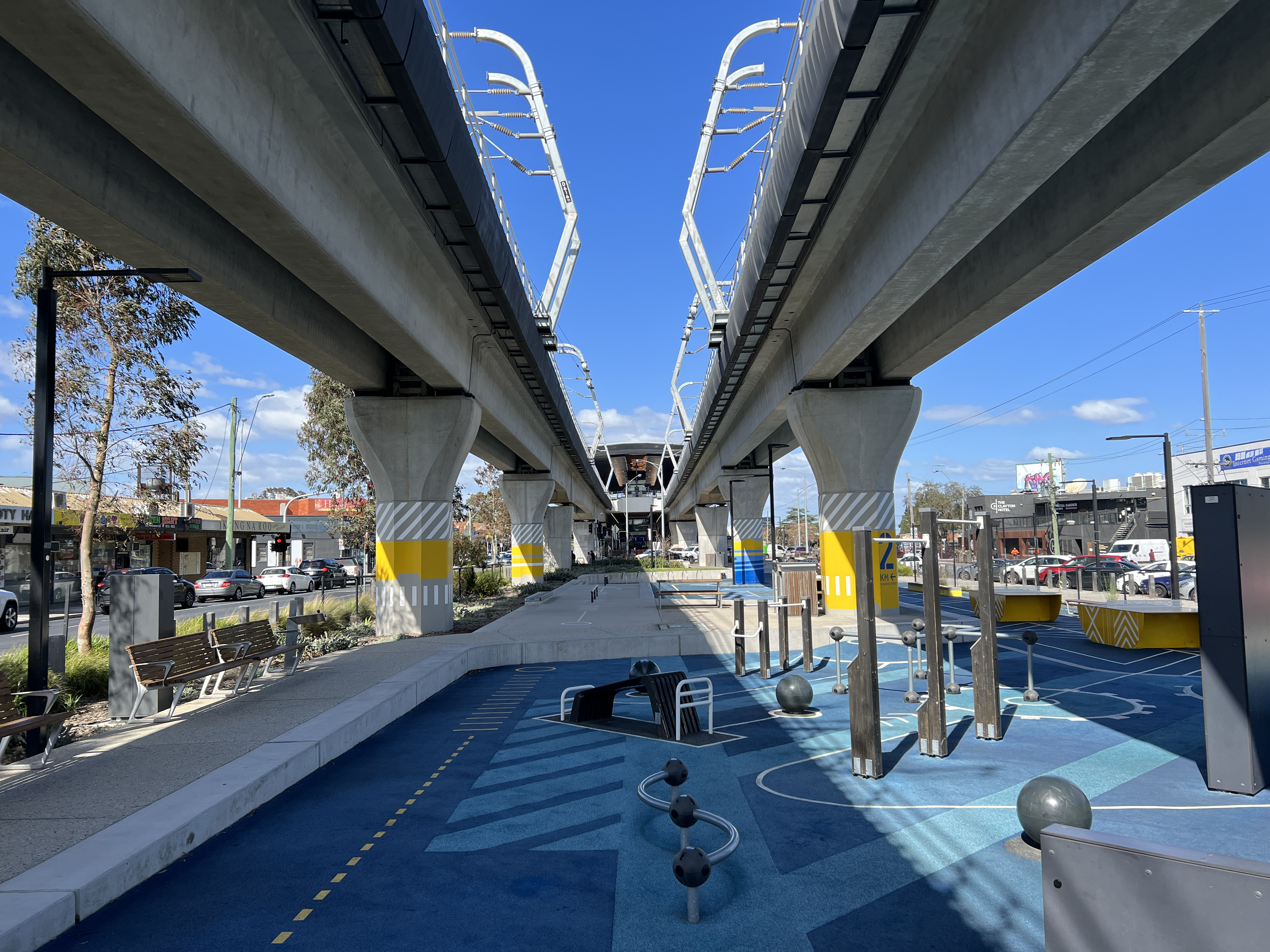
Recreational space underneath the station, 2023

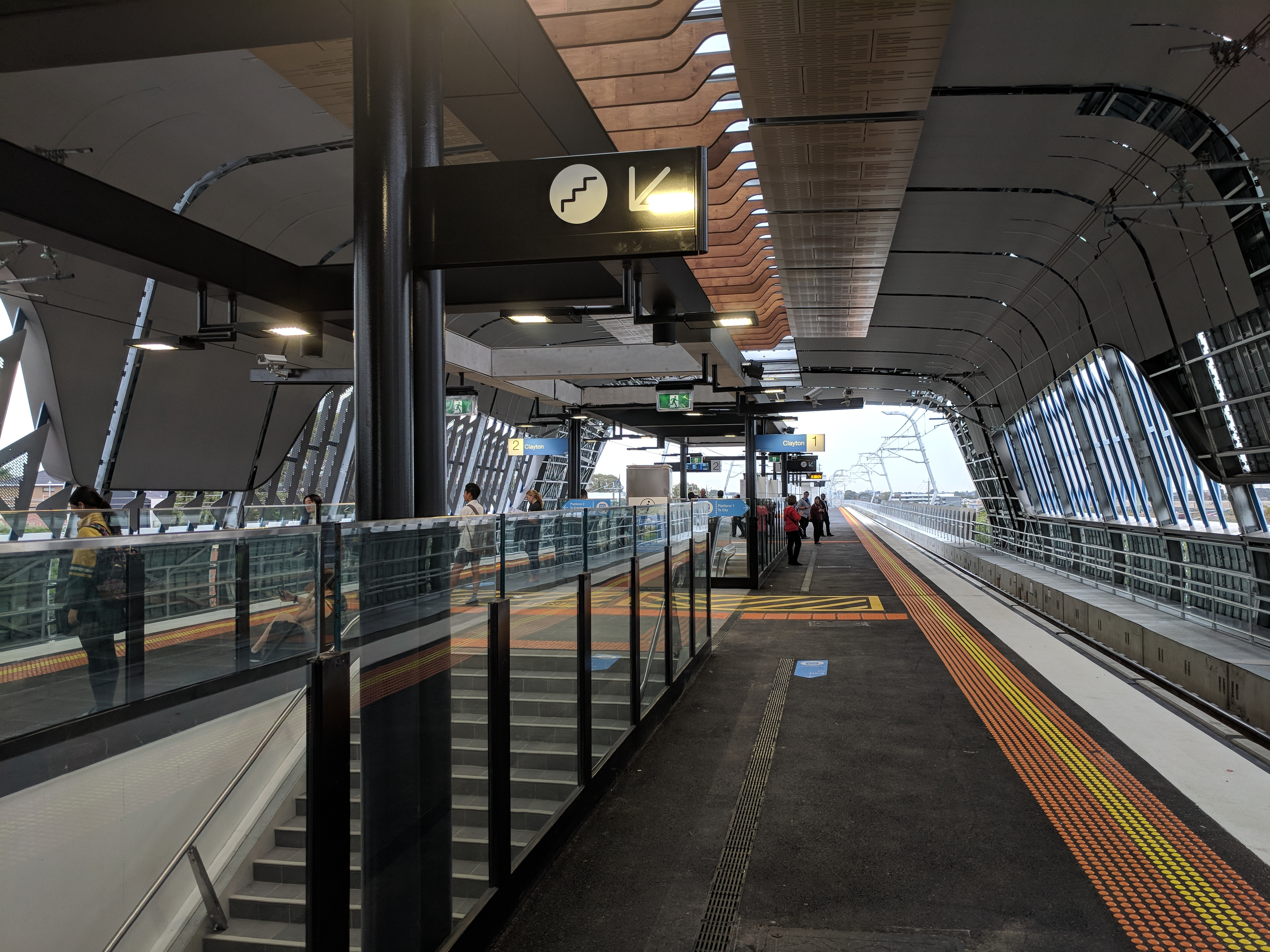
South-east bound view from the elevated Platform 2, 2018
