= Glen Waverley railway station =

Commuter railway station in Melbourne, Australia

Glen Waverley
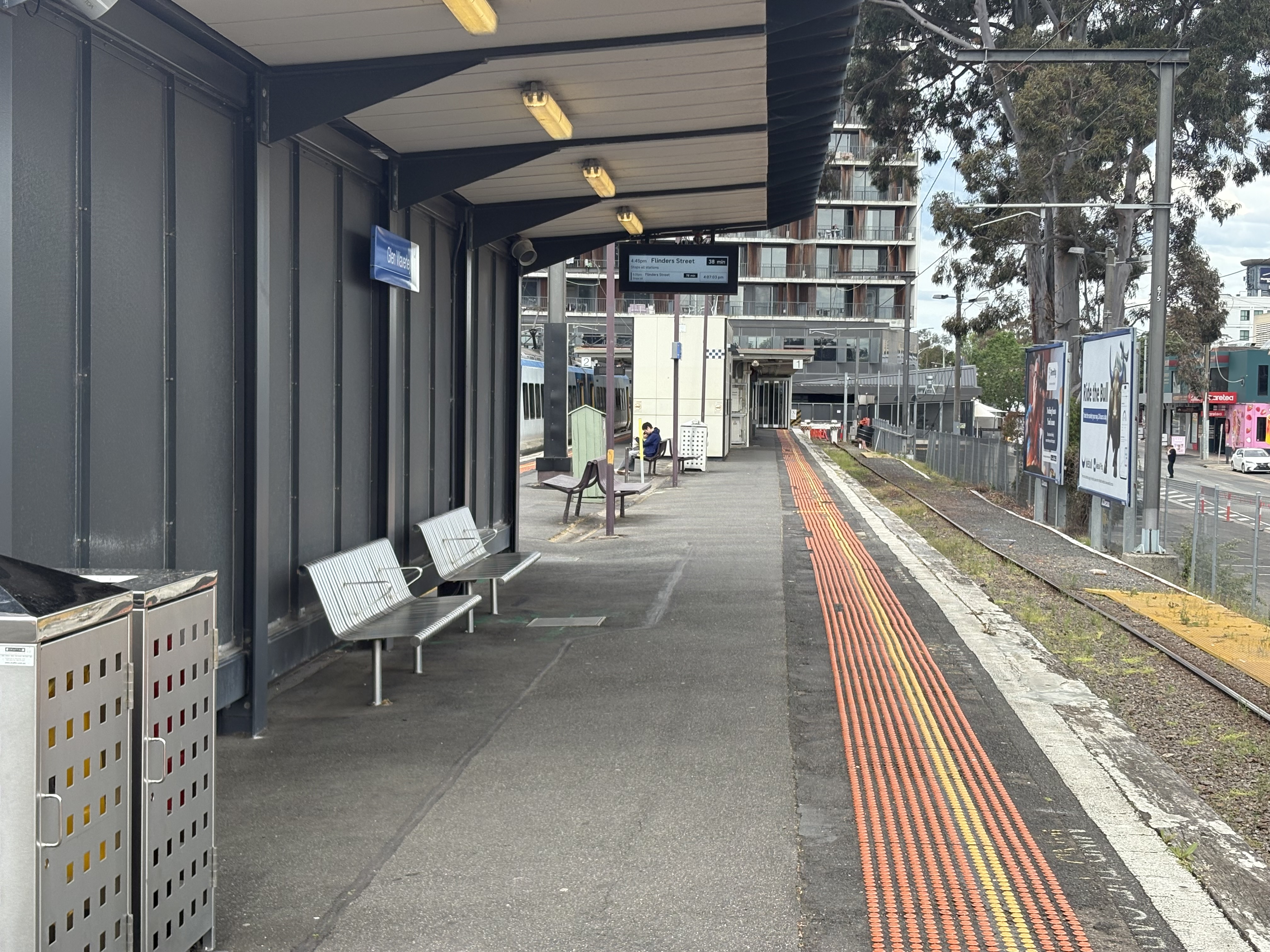
- Eastbound view from Platform 1, November 2025

General information
- Location: Kingsway, Glen Waverley, Victoria 3150; City of Monash; Australia
- Coordinates: 37°52′46″S 145°09′45″E
- System: PTV commuter rail station
- Owner: VicTrack
- Operator: Metro Trains
- Line: Glen Waverley
- Distance: 22.23 kilometres from Southern Cross
- Platforms: 2 (1 island)
- Tracks: 5
- Connections: Bus

Construction
- Structure type: Ground
- Parking: 370
- Cycle facilities: 8
- Accessible: No — steep ramp

Other information
- Status: Operational, premium station
- Station code: GWY
- Fare zone: Myki zone 2
- Website: Public Transport Victoria

History
- Opened: 5 May 1930; 96 years ago
- Rebuilt: 29 November 1964
- Electrified: May 1930 (1500 V DC overhead)

Passengers
- 2005–2006: 1,458,521
- 2006–2007: 1,501,618 ▲2.95%
- 2007–2008: 1,601,528 ▲6.65%
- 2008–2009: 1,754,750 ▲9.56%
- 2009–2010: 1,867,882 ▲6.44%
- 2010–2011: 1,984,923 ▲6.26%
- 2011–2012: 1,800,924 ▼9.26%
- 2012–2013: Not measured
- 2013–2014: 1,691,793 ▼6.05%
- 2014–2015: 1,649,225 ▼2.51%
- 2015–2016: 1,702,090 ▲3.2%
- 2016–2017: 1,715,425 ▲0.78%
- 2017–2018: 1,686,753 ▼1.67%
- 2018–2019: 1,693,350 ▲0.39%
- 2019–2020: 1,305,600 ▼22.89%
- 2020–2021: 530,400 ▼59.37%
- 2021–2022: 705,400 ▲32.99%
- 2022–2023: 1,291,900 ▲83.14%
- 2023–2024: 1,326,650 ▲2.69%
- 2024–2025: 1,209,700 ▼8.82%

Services
Preceding station	Metro Trains	Following station
Syndal towards Flinders Street	Glen Waverley line	Terminus
Future
Monash towards Southland	Suburban Rail Loop East (under construction)	Burwood (SRL) towards Box Hill
Track layout
Location

Glen Waverley station is a railway station operated by Metro Trains Melbourne and the terminus of the Glen Waverley line, which is part of the Melbourne rail network. It serves the suburb of Glen Waverley in the south-east of Melbourne, Victoria, Australia. The station originally opened in 1930 as part of the line's extension from East Malvern. The station consists of a single island platform with two faces, that is connected to Kingsway via a ramp on the station's eastern end.

Additionally, the station is served by ten bus routes, including SmartBus route 902. The station is approximately 22 kilometres (14 mi) or around a 35-minute train ride from Flinders Street station.

== Description ==
Glen Waverley is located in the suburb of Glen Waverley. On the north side of the station is Railway Parade, on the south side of the station is Coleman Parade and Kingsway is to the east. The station is owned by VicTrack, a state government agency, and is operated by Metro Trains Melbourne.

The length of the island platform is approximately 160 metres (520 ft), long enough for a Metro Trains 7-car High Capacity Metro Trains (HCMT). There is a single station building that primarily serves as a waiting room.

The main car park at the station is located on Railway Parade, just north of the station. Although there are ramps, they do not fully comply with the Disability Discrimination Act of 1992 as the gradient of the ramps is steeper than the maximum of 1:14 allowed under the Act.

== History ==
Glen Waverley station opened on 5 May 1930, when the railway line was extended from East Malvern. Like the suburb itself, the station was named after a township which was privately surveyed in 1853. The owner named it after Sir Walter Scott's novel Waverley.

Upon opening, the station was located near the current day Springvale Road. In 1964, the station moved to its current site. The former station building was relocated to Epping, which became the terminus of the Epping line in November of that year. Also in that year, the line between Syndal and Glen Waverley was duplicated.

In 1966, State government and local council worked with private enterprise to build parking and commercial facilities on under-utilised land around the station. As part of the deal, the Masaga Group developed a concourse next to the station entrance. It had a ground-floor pedestrian arcade linking with a level of office space above.

On 23 June 1979, a fire destroyed Tait motor carriage 339M whilst stabled in No. 4 road. The fire also damaged trailer carriage 407T and two stabled Hitachi sets.

On 16 August 1995, Glen Waverley was upgraded to a premium station.

In 2012, works began to redevelop the station's existing two-storey retail and office building into the 12-storey "Ikon" apartment building as part of VicTrack's station precinct enhancement program. The building's pedestrian thoroughfare, which is also a utilities easement, is more-or-less located where the original stood.

The $70 million development was completed in 2013, with the proceeds being used to fund a $1.8 million upgrade to the station forecourt. Works were completed in mid-2014. The upgrade included a brand new station entrance, kiosk andaccessibility improvements.

In 2018, the station was chosen to be one of the stops on the under-construction Suburban Rail Loop East. Early works on the project have already commenced in the suburb, with the line expect to open between Southland and Box Hill by 2035.

== Platforms and services ==
The station is currently served by citybound services on the Glen Waverley line, which is operated by Metro Trains Melbourne. Services to the city head to Burnley, joining the Alamein, Belgrave and Lilydale lines, before heading to Richmond and traveling through the City Loop in a clockwise direction.

Glen Waverley platform arrangement
Platform	Line	Destination	Service Type	Source
1	Glen Waverley line	Flinders Street	All stations and limited express services, only used during peak times	
2	Glen Waverley line	Flinders Street	All stations and limited express services	

== Suburban Rail Loop ==
From 2035 onward, Glen Waverley will be connected to the Suburban Rail Loop, which will operate from Southland to Box Hill.

- Suburban Rail Loop East services to Southland and Box Hill

== Transport links ==
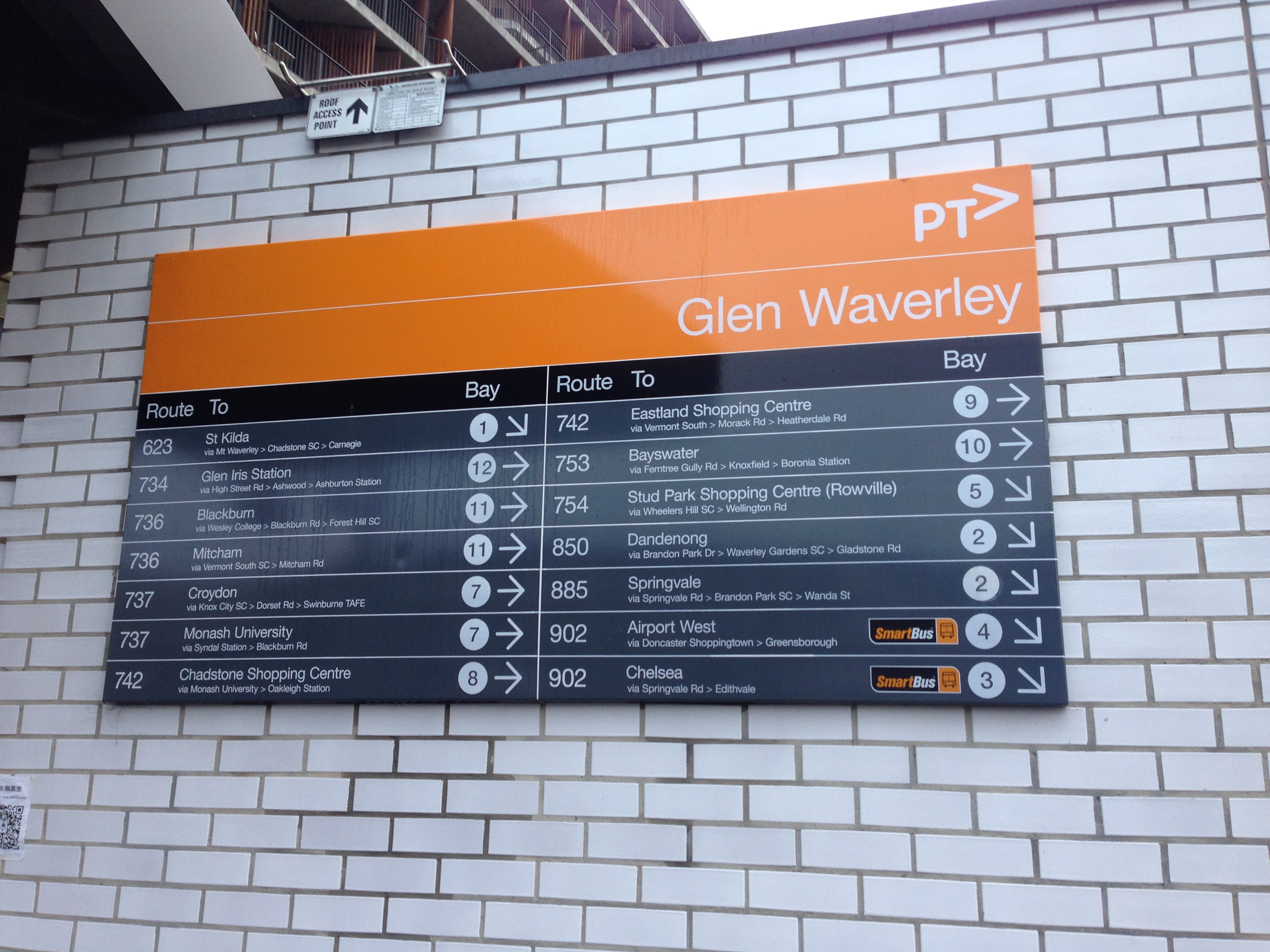
Interchange sign showing bus routes servicing Glen Waverley station in 2019.

Glen Waverley is served by 10 bus routes, all departing from the bus interchange just north of the station on Railway Parade. These routes are 734, 623, 736, 737, 742, 753, 754, 850, 885, and SmartBus route 902.

- 734 : to Glen Iris station
- 623 : to St Kilda
- 736 : Blackburn station to Mitcham station
- 737 : Monash University Clayton Campus to Croydon station
- 742 : Ringwood station to Chadstone Shopping Centre
- 753 : to Bayswater station
- 754 : to Rowville
- 850 : to Dandenong station
- 885 : to Springvale station
- SmartBus 902 : Westfield Airport West to Chelsea station
