= Highett railway station =

Railway station in Melbourne, Australia

Highett
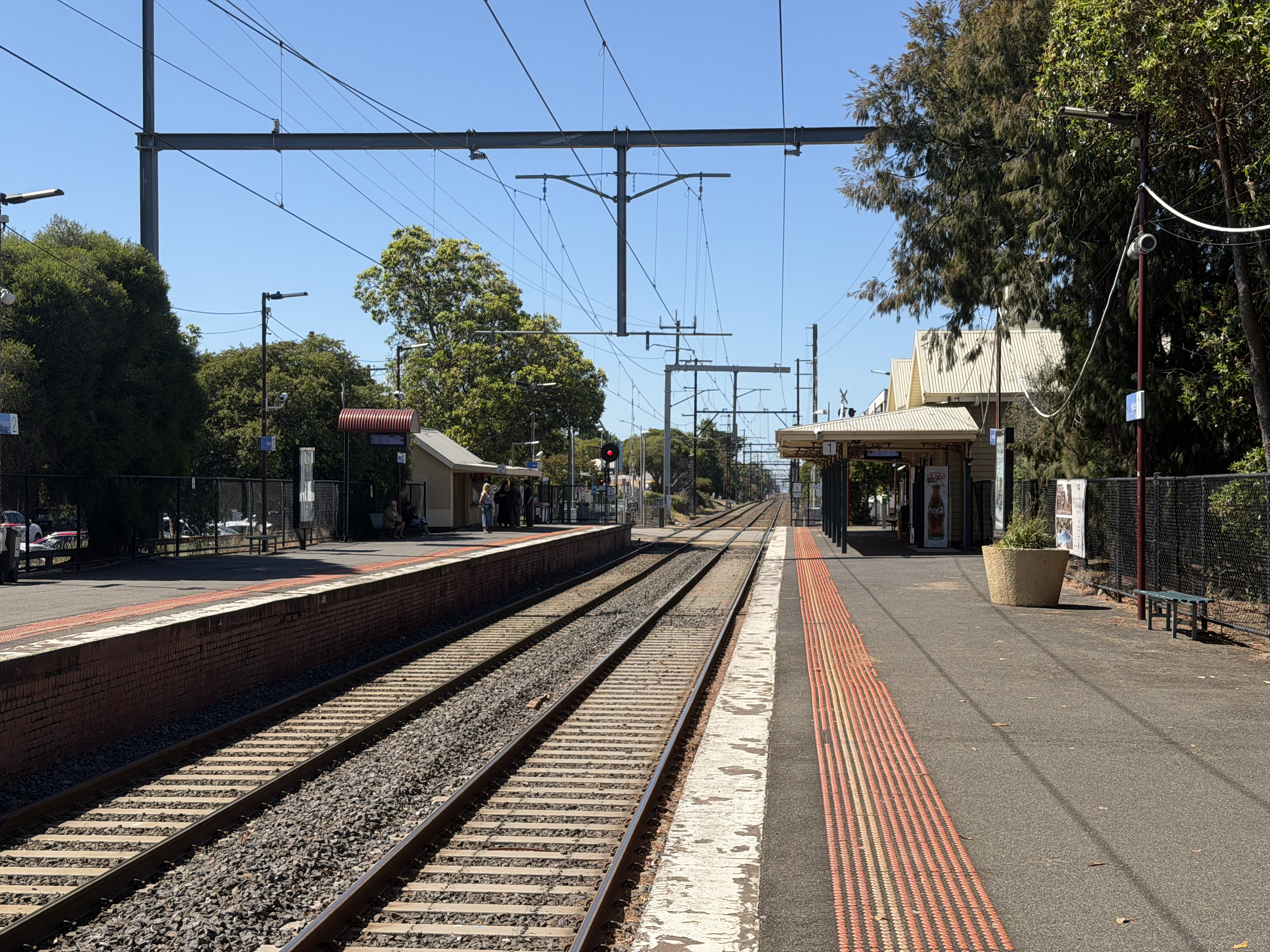
- Southbound view from Platform 1, January 2026

General information
- Location: Railway Parade, Highett, Victoria 3190; City of Bayside; City of Kingston; Australia
- Coordinates: 37°56′55″S 145°02′30″E
- System: PTV commuter rail station
- Owner: VicTrack
- Operator: Metro Trains
- Line: Frankston
- Distance: 20.06 kilometres from Southern Cross
- Platforms: 2 side
- Tracks: 2
- Connections: Bus

Construction
- Structure type: Ground
- Parking: 116
- Cycle facilities: Yes
- Accessible: yes

Other information
- Status: Operational, unstaffed
- Station code: HIG
- Fare zone: Myki zone 2
- Website: Public Transport Victoria

History
- Opened: 19 December 1881; 144 years ago
- Rebuilt: 1966; 1986
- Electrified: June 1922 (1500 V DC overhead)
- Former names: Highett Road (1881-1885)

Passengers
- 2005–2006: 359,708
- 2006–2007: 387,204 ▲7.64%
- 2007–2008: 431,772 ▲11.51%
- 2008–2009: 488,272 ▲13.08%
- 2009–2010: 492,722 ▲0.91%
- 2010–2011: 524,427 ▲6.43%
- 2011–2012: 503,689 ▼3.95%
- 2012–2013: Not measured
- 2013–2014: 452,990 ▼10.06%
- 2014–2015: 480,980 ▲6.17%
- 2015–2016: 477,108 ▼0.8%
- 2016–2017: 477,313 ▲0.04%
- 2017–2018: 520,790 ▲9.1%
- 2018–2019: 508,406 ▼2.37%
- 2019–2020: 328,050 ▼35.47%
- 2020–2021: 194,000 ▼40.86%
- 2021–2022: 212,700 ▲9.63%
- 2022–2023: 292,800 ▲37.65%
- 2023–2024: 345,050 ▲17.84%
- 2024–2025: 410,950 ▲19.1%

Services
Preceding station	Metro Trains	Following station
Moorabbin towards Flinders Street via City Loop	Frankston line	Southland towards Frankston
Track layout
Location

Highett station is a railway station operated by Metro Trains Melbourne on the Frankston line, part of the Melbourne rail network. It serves the south-eastern suburb of Highett, in Melbourne, Victoria, Australia. Highett station is a ground-level unstaffed station, featuring two side platforms. It opened on 19 December 1881, with the current station built in 1986.

Initially opened as Highett Road, the station was given its current name of Highett on 14 December 1885.

== History ==
Highett station opened when the railway line from Caulfield was extended to Mordialloc. Like the suburb itself, the station was named after William Highett, a local landowner and a member of the Victorian Legislative Council.

The station was built with the endorsement of Victorian Premier Thomas Bent, who ordered the railway line be redirected through Highett, and also demanded a higher standard of departmental residences there than elsewhere. The current station building was erected in 1883 and 1884, and was refurbished in 1966. It was refurbished again in 1986, after it had been damaged by fire during the previous year.

In 1925, a railway parcels van hit a car at the nearby Wickham Road level crossing, killing eight people in the car. The gatekeeper was found not guilty of a charge of manslaughter, the jury finding the incident was due to the fault of the system, and not human negligence. In 1932, there was a shootout between a policeman and a burglar, who was killed.

In 1973, a former wood yard and a lamp room were demolished.

In 1985, boom barriers replaced interlocked gates at the Highett Road level crossing, located at the down end of the station. The signal box for the level crossing was also abolished during that time.

On 4 May 2010, as part of the 2010/2011 State Budget, $83.7 million was allocated to upgrade Highett to a premium station, along with nineteen others. However, in March 2011, that was scrapped by the Baillieu Government.

In 2014, the Victorian State Government launched a public safety initiative which involved Protective Services Officers (PSOs) patrolling railway stations at certain times of the day. On 1 June of that year, Highett was added to the list of patrolled stations. A PSO "pod" to provide an office and holding cell was also added to the station.

In October 2017, two PSOs patrolling the station were shot at by a disgruntled 22-year-old, using a battery-powered mechanical handgun filled with gel pellets. One officer was struck in the temple, but was not seriously injured. The shooter, who fired from the balcony of an apartment overlooking the station, was arrested by police and charged with a variety of offences.

In October 2022, it was announced that Highett would be elevated as part of a project to remove seven level crossings on the line, with initial completion dates estimated in 2029. However, in May 2026, it was announced that the removal of Wickham Road and Highett Road level crossing removals were further delayed between mid-2032 to 2033 to align with Suburban Rail Loop construction and precinct scheduling and recent State Budget updates.

== Platforms and services ==
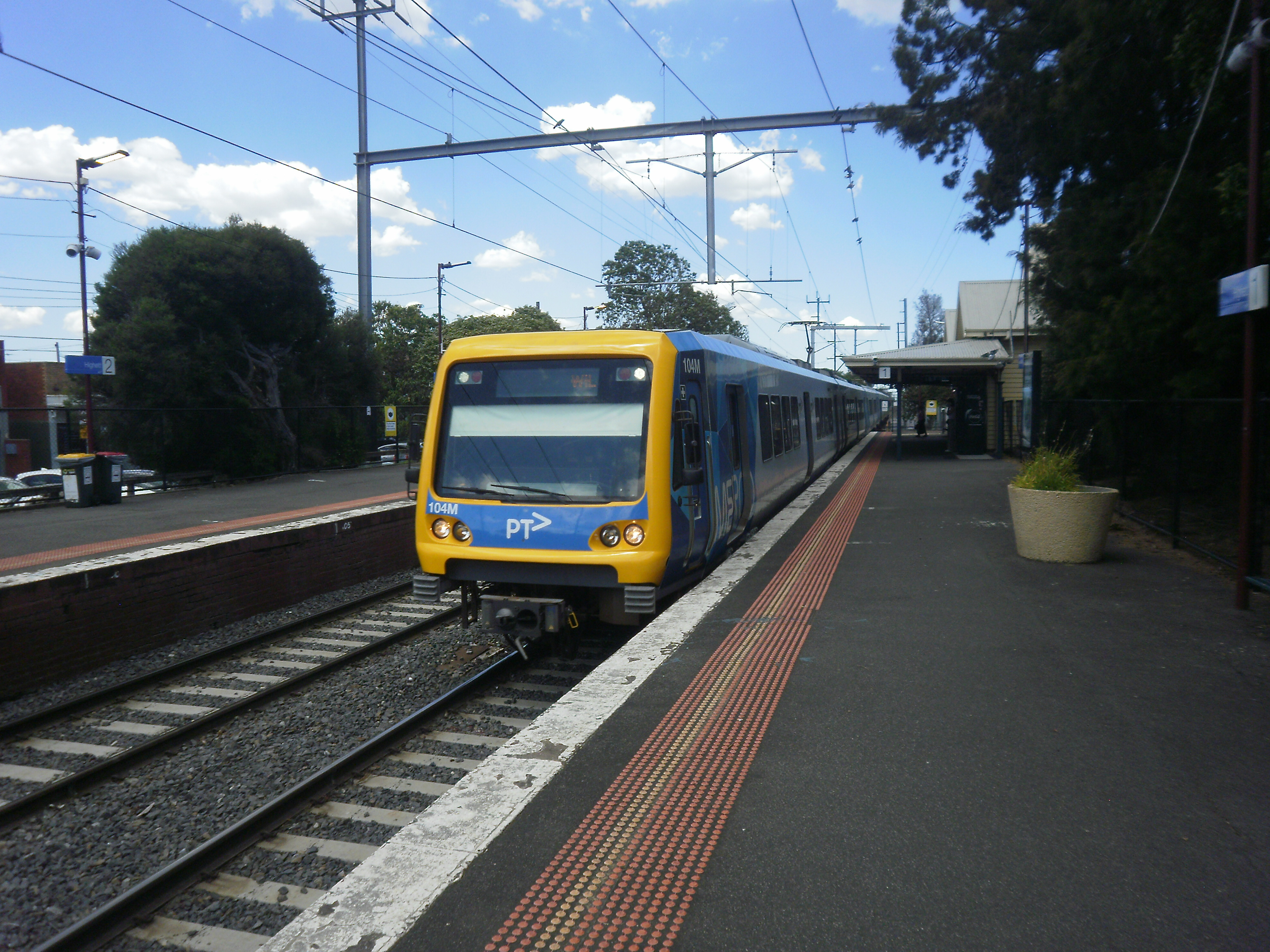
An X'Trapolis train arriving on a Williamstown-bound service, November 2021

Highett has two side platforms. It is served by Frankston line trains.

Highett platform arrangement
Platform	Line	Destination	Via	Service Type	Source
1	Frankston line	Flinders Street	City Loop	All stations and limited express services	
2	Frankston line	Frankston, Cheltenham or Carrum		All stations	

== Transport links ==
Ventura Bus Lines operates two routes via Highett station, under contract to Public Transport Victoria:

- 708 : Hampton station – Carrum station
- 828 : Hampton station – Berwick station

== Gallery ==
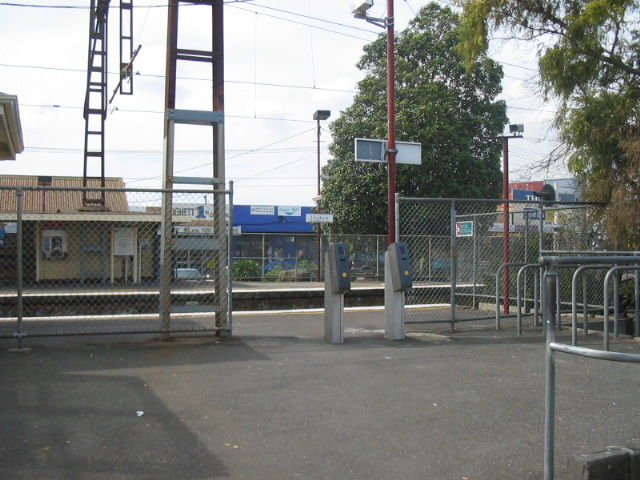
Entrance to Platform 1, September 2005

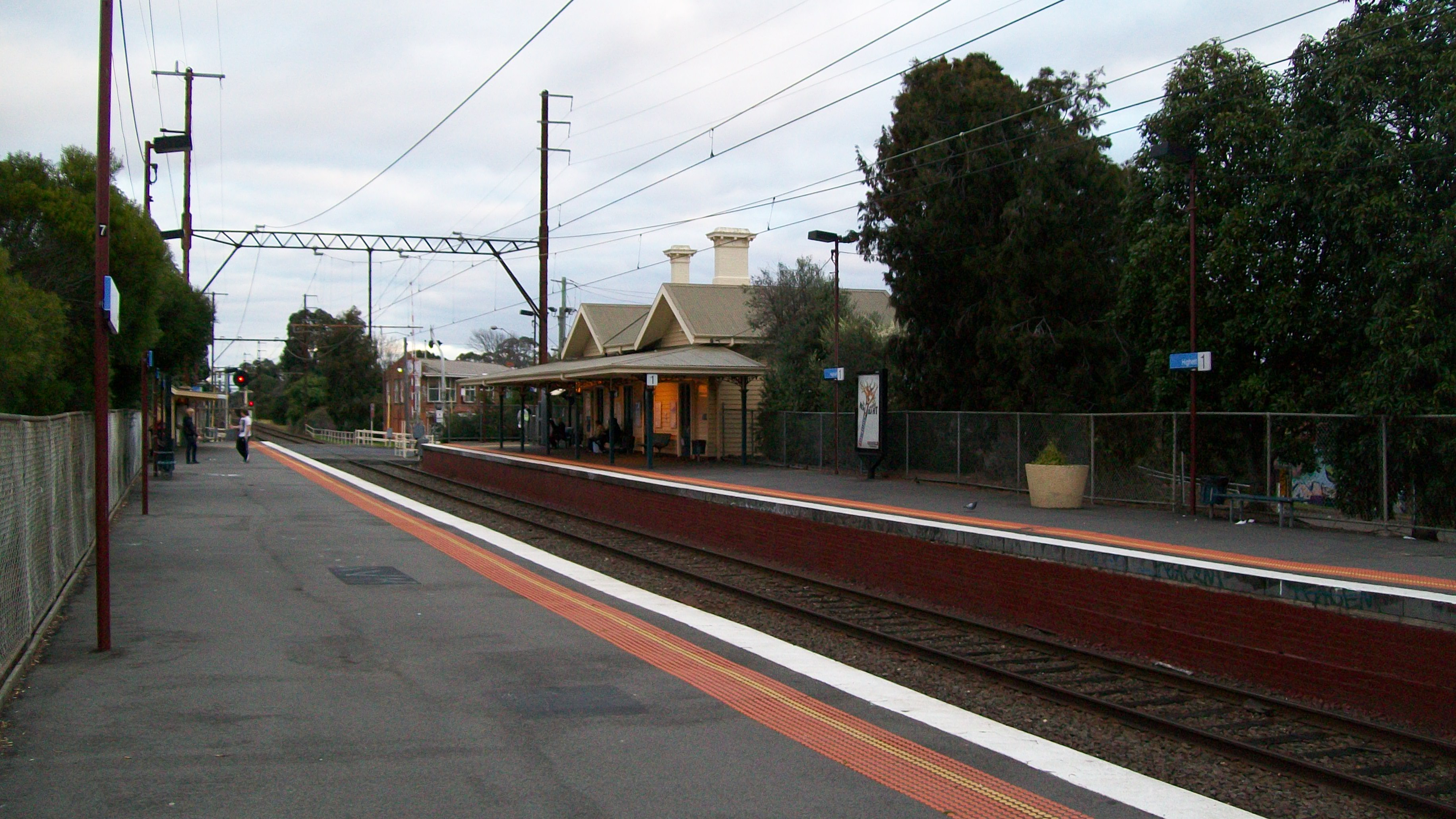
Southbound view from Platform 2, July 2010

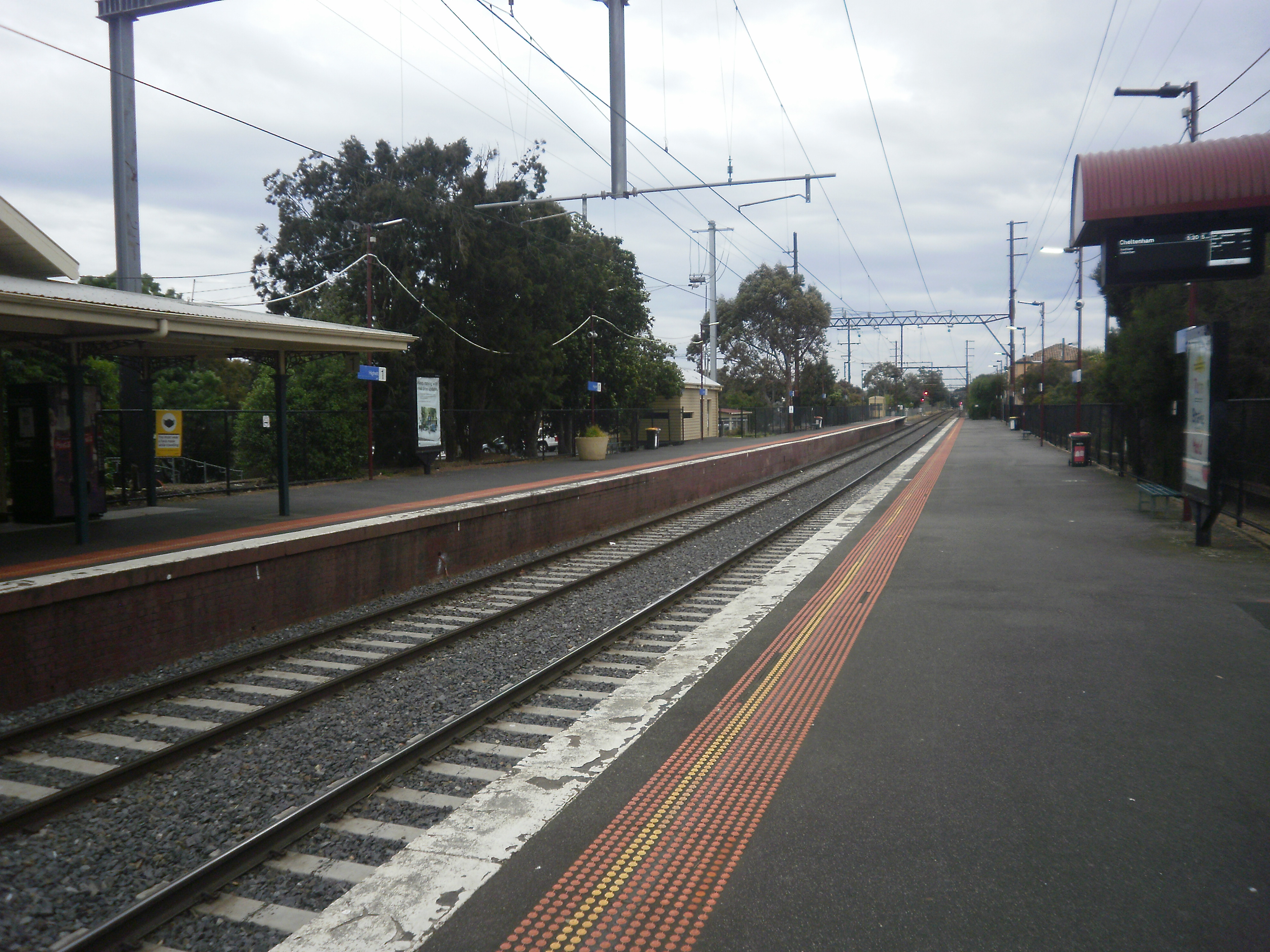
Northbound view from Platform 2,
September 2021

== See also ==
- Southland railway station
