= Westfield Southland =

Coordinates: 37°57′29″S 145°03′00″E

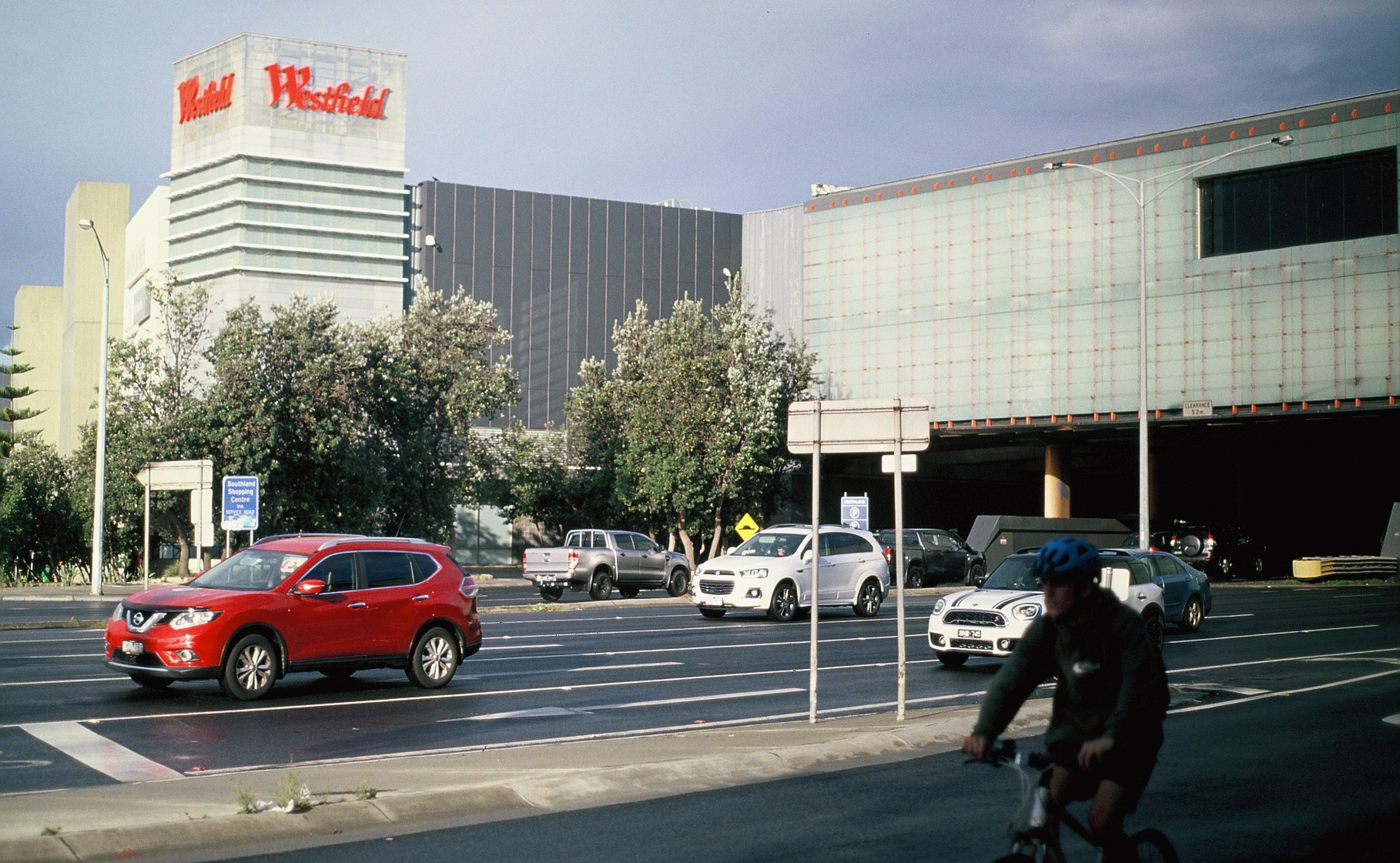
- Westfield Southland in 2022
- Location: Cheltenham, Victoria, Australia
- Opened: September 1968; 58 years ago
- Owner: Jointly Owned: AMP Limited (50%); Scentre Group (50%)
- Num. of stores: ~394
- Floor area: ~129,094 m^{2} (1,389,556 sq ft)
- Floors: 3 (retail); 6 (carpark)
- Parking: 5,980
- Public transit: Southland bus interchange; Southland railway station
- Website: westfield.com.au/southland

Westfield Southland (previously known as Southland Centre) is a shopping centre in the suburb of Cheltenham in Melbourne, Australia. Southland has a floor area of 129,180m², making it one of the biggest shopping centres in Australia by size. There are approximately 400 retailers in Southland, including Myer, David Jones and Harris Scarfe. According to the Melbourne 2030 Metropolitan Strategy, Southland is recognised as one of 26 Principal Activity Centres. The centre is also one of the most profitable shopping centres in Australia, with an annual turnover of $857.9-million recorded in 2016.

== History ==
The land on which Southland was built was formerly a farm and English garden designed by artist Henrietta Maria Gulliver, and was a renowned show place in the area. It was then later part of the Methodist Home for Boys, before being sold in 1966. Southland shopping centre was designed by Melbourne architects Tomkins, Shaw & Evans, who had previously designed Westfield Miranda in 1964. At the time of its opening, in September 1968, Southland was one of the premier shopping centres in Melbourne. It was, by modern standards, a relatively small shopping centre with only a handful of large stores, including a Myer department store and a Safeway supermarket, plus a few dozen other smaller retailers, banks and cafes. An unusual feature was a roof garden with lawns, shrubs and trees. Another notable design feature were wall murals in the hallways leading in from the entrances that featured original abstract art-work on ceramic tiles. Architectural photographer Wolfgang Sievers took a series of striking images of the building soon after it opened and these are now held by the National Library of Australia.

Architects Tomkins, Shaw & Evans received the 1969 Victorian Architecture Medal for their design of Southland, beating the National Gallery of Victoria for the award. This was during a period when shopping centres were recognised "for the quality of their design or amenity". Prior to the mid–1980s Southland was owned by Myer, and the centre would not rival the nearby Chadstone Shopping Centre in size, until the Westfield Group took over management.

During Southland's history, many renovations and face-lifts have shaped the centre, such as the first expansion in 1987 and the development of a Village Cinemas complex and food court in 1990. The rooftop garden was removed upon first redevelopment and was replaced with a third level of stores.

=== 1990s redevelopment ===
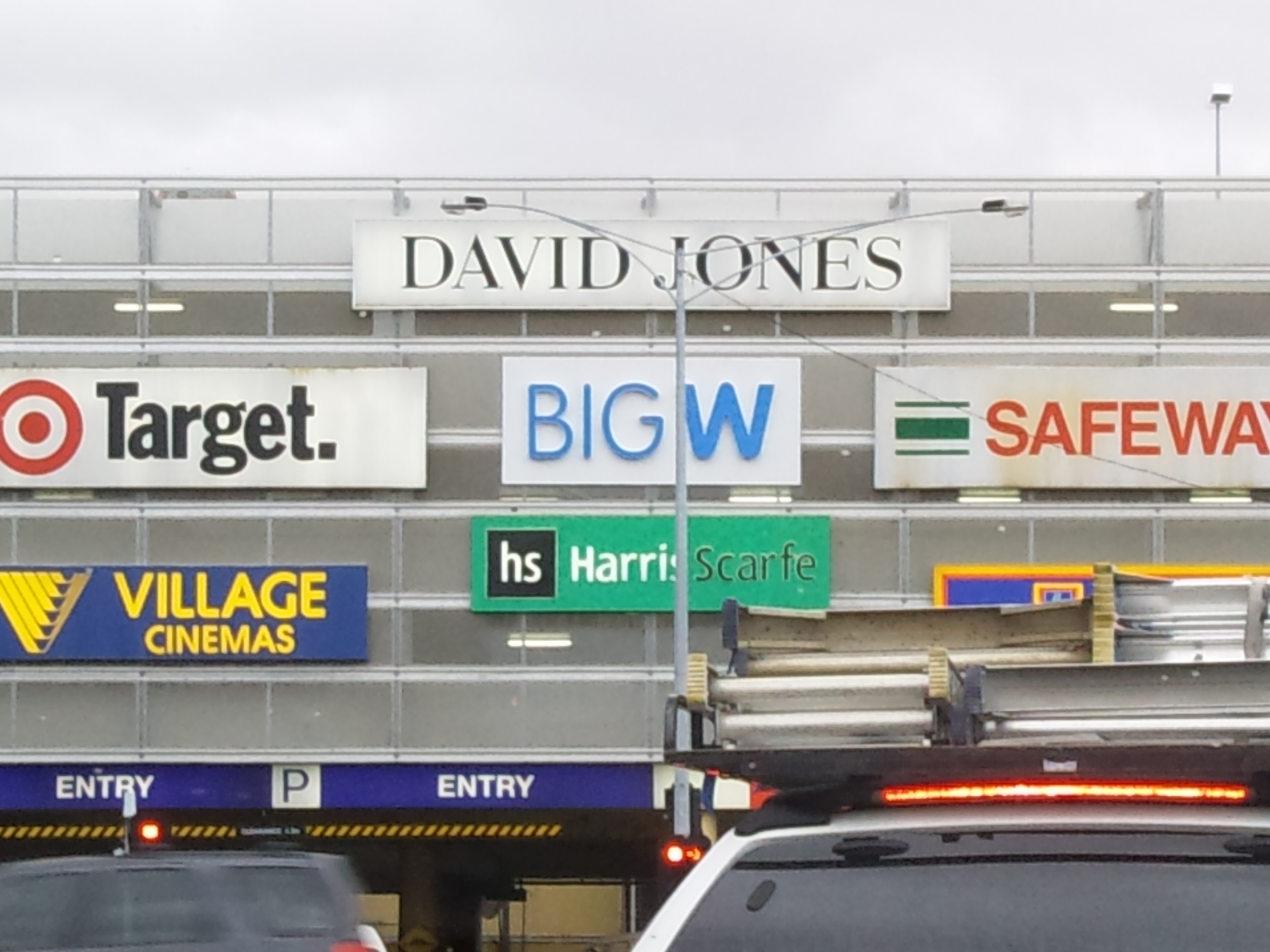
View from Nepean Highway (East side)

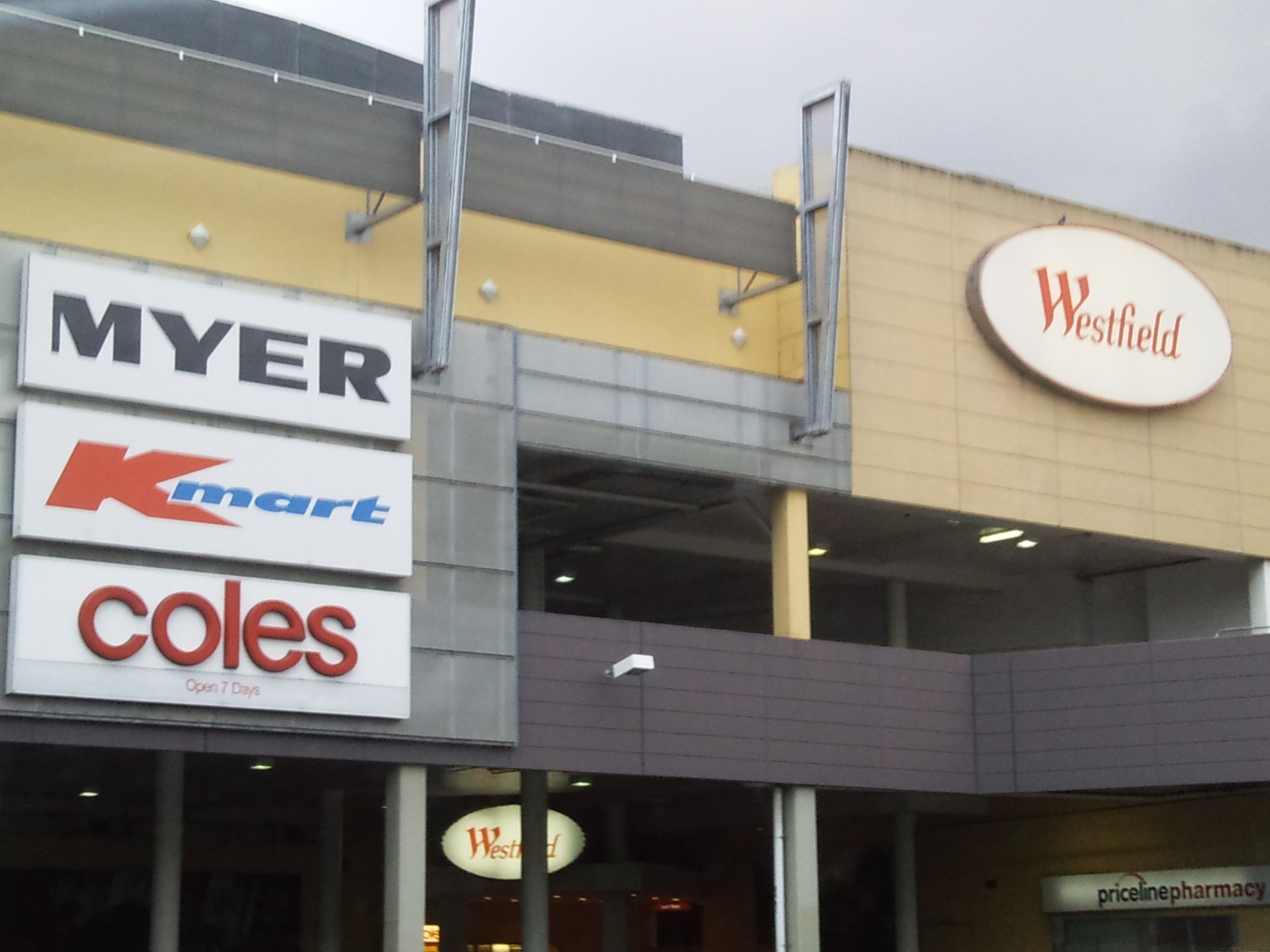
View from Nepean Highway (West side)

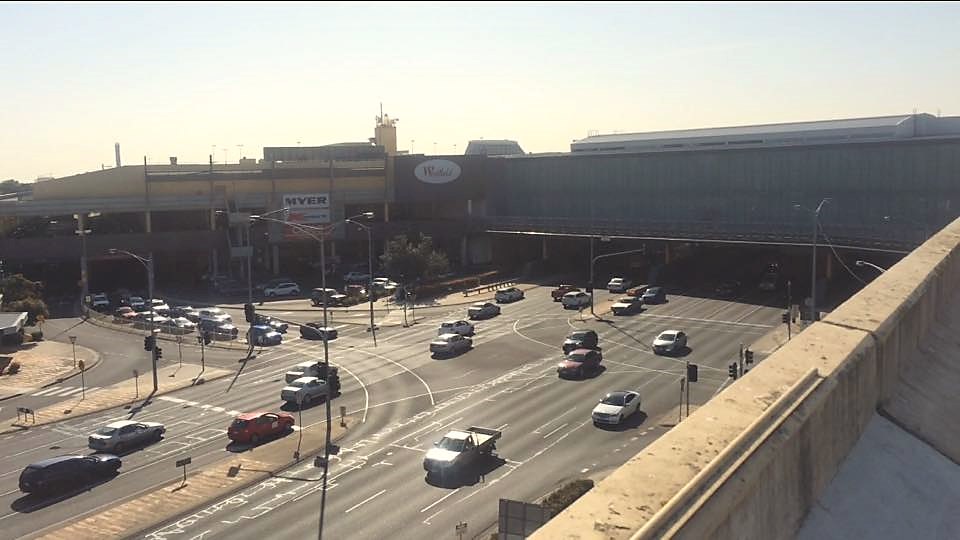
Westfield Southland 2015.

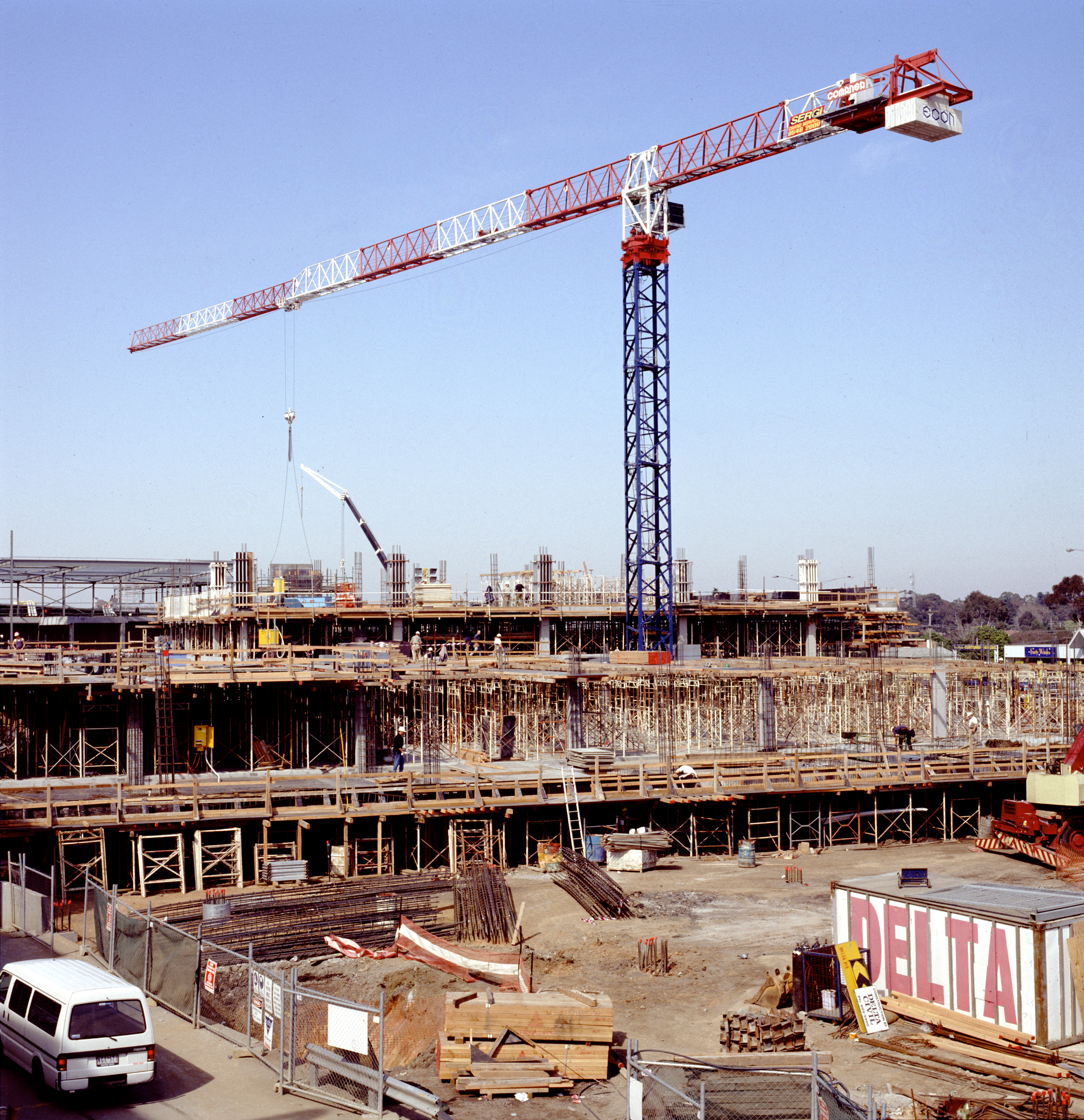
The new centre under construction.

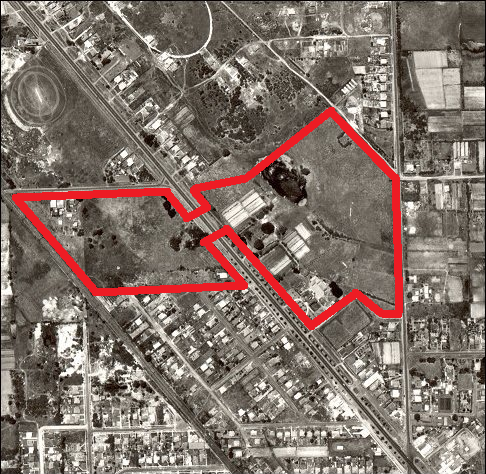
An aerial photograph of the area in which Southland now stands, in 1951, with the current centre's land perimeter shown in red.

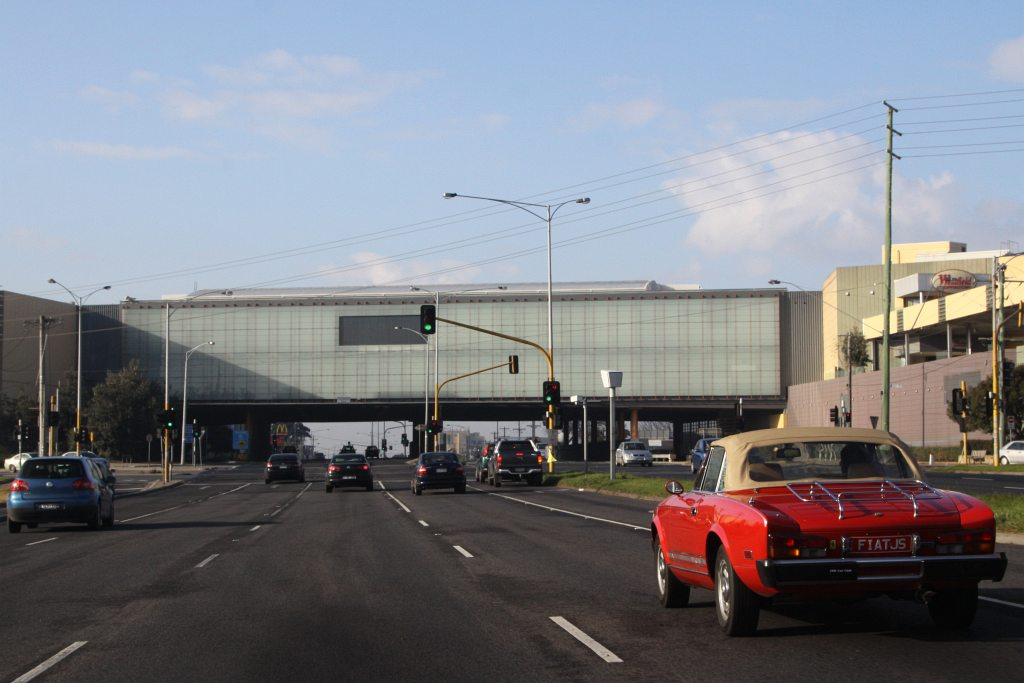
Northern side of the retail bridge over the Nepean Highway, in 2011.

Prior to the extension, the 70,000 m^{2} (750,000 sq ft) Southland shopping centre had very limited development options. In June 1991, Westfield developers began discussions with the City of Moorabbin about the rezoning of the 60,000 m^{2} (650,000 sq ft) Cheltenham market area in order for them to construct a multimillion-dollar extension of Southland as part of a major redevelopment. The original plan was to have replaced the market with a ten-storey office tower and a two-level shopping centre, with a retail bridge connecting the new centre with the existing Westfield Centre over the eight-lane Nepean Highway. The new centre would feature a discount supermarket and a regular supermarket as well as new speciality stores. All up, the whole centre would comprise up to 360 stores. In June 1993, planning approval was given by the Minister for Planning Rob Maclellan.

In December 1996, plans were changed in favour of better car park arrangements as well as easier access to the centre. The centre would soon feature more than 400 stores across three levels.

In November 1997, demolition commenced at the Cheltenham market site. In March 1998, the first concrete was poured by the Premier of Victoria Jeff Kennett. The two sites were to be linked by a bridge with shops on it. The former cinemas and food court were demolished, and the wide, multi-level retail-pedestrian-vehicle bridge (largest of its kind in the Southern Hemisphere) was added. During this time, the Myer anchor moved from the original site to the newer site. Construction was not just limited to the new site with the original site being upgraded to include a new larger cinema complex, in the youth-oriented mall called The Street.

The redevelopment was opened in stages, with The Street opening in April 1999. The main part of the redevelopment, the additional site and bridge were opened on 28 October 1999. The $300 million redevelopment was completed on 5 May 2000, with the opening of the David Jones department store.

Subsequently, another $13 million was used for additional work, which included construction of shaded car park areas, two new car park ramps as well as a large glass window attached to the second level of the retail bridge, which has views 16 kilometres in the distance of the Melbourne CBD.

=== Melbourne 2030 Metropolitan Strategy ===
From 2002, the Victorian State Government has designated Southland as one of 26 Principal Activity Centres in the city, as described in the Melbourne 2030 Metropolitan Strategy.

A focal point of the activity centre has been public transport; a 2002 planning report found gaps in Melbourne's transit pertaining to Southland, particularly its lack of transport accessibility. In 2013, Public Transport Victoria (PTV) released its 20-year Network Development Plan; the report found that a railway station at Southland would need to be built within the next five years, as to improve Melbourne's transport system. In 2015, the Victorian Government committed to building a railway station at Southland to serve the busy shopping centre. Construction on Southland railway station commenced in 2016 and it was completed and opened in November 2017.

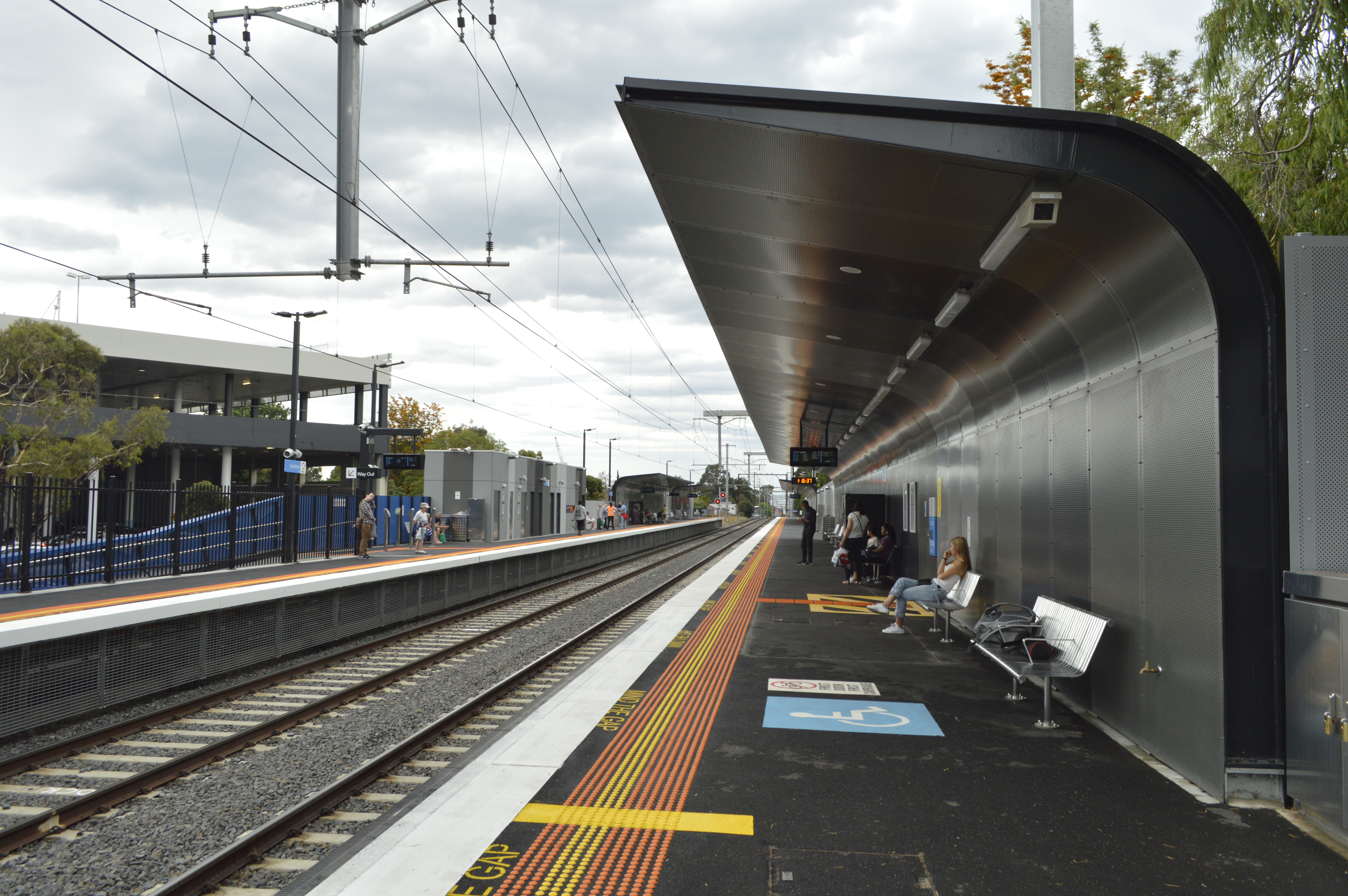
Southland railway station

== Tenants ==
Westfield Southland features up to 400 tenants including major retailers such as Myer, David Jones, Coles Supermarkets, Woolworths, Aldi, Target Australia, Big W, Kmart Australia, Harris Scarfe, and Village Cinemas. The mini major retailers include JB Hi-Fi, Best & Less, Sephora, Cotton On Super Store, Rebel Sport, Apple, Toymate and Timezone and Zone Bowling.

The centre recorded an annual turnover of $857.9 million in 2016, according to Scentre Group.

== Popular culture ==
A large number of scenes for the Seven Network comedy Kath & Kim were filmed at Southland. In the program the centre is designated as Fountain Lakes, where some of the shopping scenes are also filmed. The centre is also featured in multiple episodes of the ABC2 television drama-comedy series Please Like Me.
