= Suburban Rail Loop East =

Under construction rapid transit line in Melbourne, Australia

SRL East
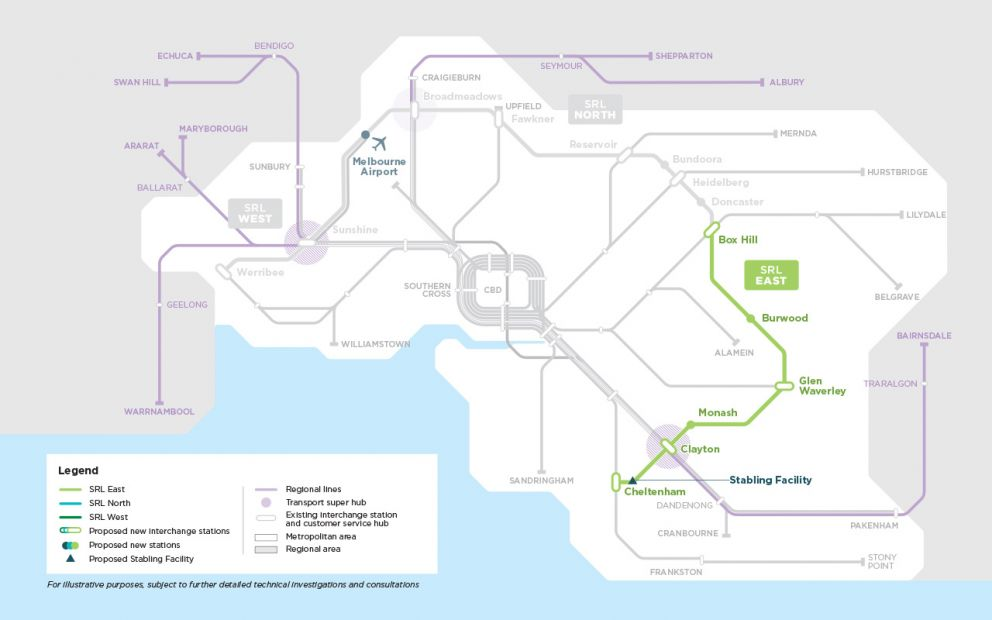
- Suburban Rail Loop map, with SRL East alignment highlighted in green

Overview
- Status: Under construction
- Owner: VicTrack (Projected)
- Locale: Melbourne, Australia
- Stations: 6

Service
- Type: Rapid transit line
- System: Suburban Rail Loop
- Operator: TransitLinX (Note: comprising John Holland and RATP Dev when operating)
- Depot: Heatherton Train Stabling Site
- Rolling stock: 13 4-car driverless Alstom Metropolis trains

History
- Opened: 2035 (projected)
- Announced: November 2018
- Early construction commenced: June 2022
- Major construction commenced: 2023

Technical
- Line length: 26 km (16 mi)
- Number of tracks: 2
- Character: Underground
- Track gauge: 1,435 mm (4 ft 8 1/2 in) standard gauge
- Electrification: 25 kV 50 Hz AC from overhead catenary
- Operating speed: 100 km/h (62 mph)
- Signalling: Alstom Urbalis Forward

Suburban Rail Loop East (SRL East) is a rapid transit underground rail project currently under construction in Melbourne, Victoria, Australia. It involves constructing an orbital railway line from Cheltenham in the south-eastern suburbs to Box Hill in the eastern suburbs of Melbourne via Clayton, Monash University, Glen Waverley and Burwood. SRL East is being managed by Suburban Rail Loop Authority.

SRL East is the first stage of the stand-alone Suburban Rail Loop system. Construction commenced in 2022 and is expected to open in 2035.

== Project history ==
Following the initial announcement of the SRL development in August 2018, the state government formed the Suburban Rail Loop Authority in September 2019, at the same time as confirming the six station precincts for SRL East. In November 2019, the government announced that the loop would be an operationally independent, standalone line using different rail technology from the existing suburban rail network. The system would use new, smaller metro rollingstock that is four to five carriages long, allowing shorter platforms. The Premier announced an intention to use private investment to help fund the line, but did not indicate whether the line would be driverless.

In 2020, the state government committed a further $2.2 billion for initial and early works on the loop, with expressions of interest opened for contractors to deliver these works. Jacinta Allan, who in her role as Minister for Transport Infrastructure had overseen the SRL since its inception, was given the additional role of Minister for the Suburban Rail Loop.

In December 2025, Victorian premier Jacinta Allan announced that taxes would be raised through measures the existing land tax and windfall gains tax, new infrastructure contribution levies paid by property developers, car park levies, and through state-generated developments. The federal government has also promised to contribute $10 billion in extra funding. The state government also announced that a contract to build the new trains would be awarded to TansitLinX, which is a consortium that consists of John Holland, RATP Dev, Alstom, KP and WSP. The model of the Suburban Rail Loop trains are based on the Alstom Metropolis family.

== Construction ==
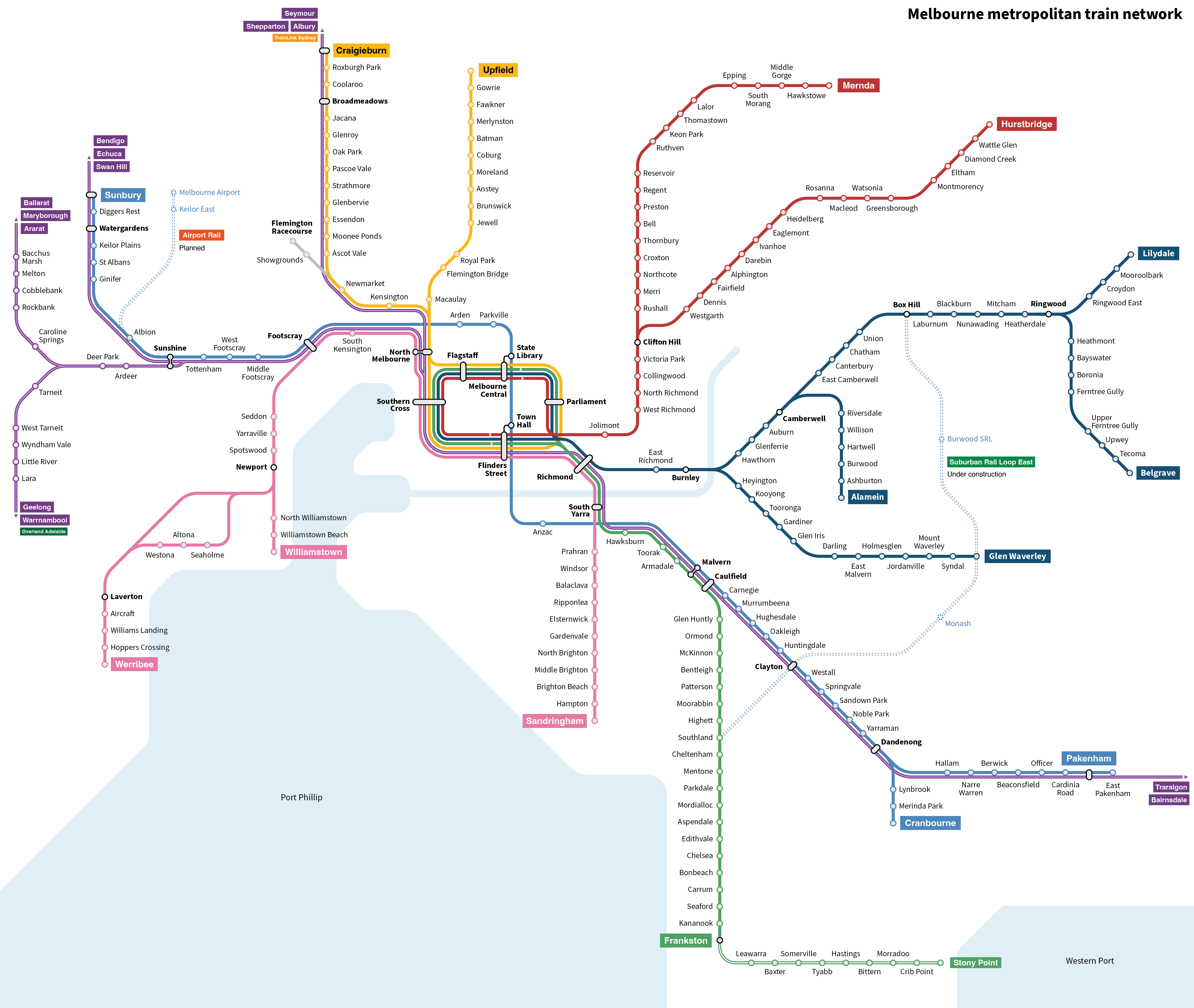
Map showing the Melbourne metropolitan rail network, with SRL East shown as a dotted line. Early construction began in 2022 on SRL East, the system's first stage and the city's first stand-alone orbital rail line.

On 2 June 2022, early works began on SRL East with major construction expected to commence in 2023, followed by tunnelling works in 2026.

=== Early works ===
In November 2021, the State Government committed $9.3 billion in funding towards SRL East on top of $2.5 billion previously allocated for planning and early works. Engineering firm Laing O'Rourke was awarded the contract to deliver early works, which were set to begin in 2022.

In March 2022, a tender process was opened for two major works packages to deliver the SRL East tunnels. The first is a 16 km (9.9 mi) tunnel contract between Cheltenham and Glen Waverley, the second is from Glen Waverley to Box Hill. The government announced that up to ten tunnel boring machines would be used to dig SRL East.

In May 2022, prior to the 2022 Australian federal election, Labor leader Anthony Albanese pledged $2.2 billion in federal funding for the SRL if his party was elected. Following the party's success at the election, the Albanese Government allocated the money in its October 2022/23 budget.

In June 2022, construction work began on the project with early works and utility relocations commencing at the Clayton precinct. Early works in 2023 included the relocation of the tram terminus of Route 109 on Whitehorse Road in order to allow the excavation of the Box Hill SRL station, the preparation of a tunnel boring machine (TBM) launch site at Burwood, and the moving of water, sewerage, electricity and gas services at each station site.

=== Major construction ===
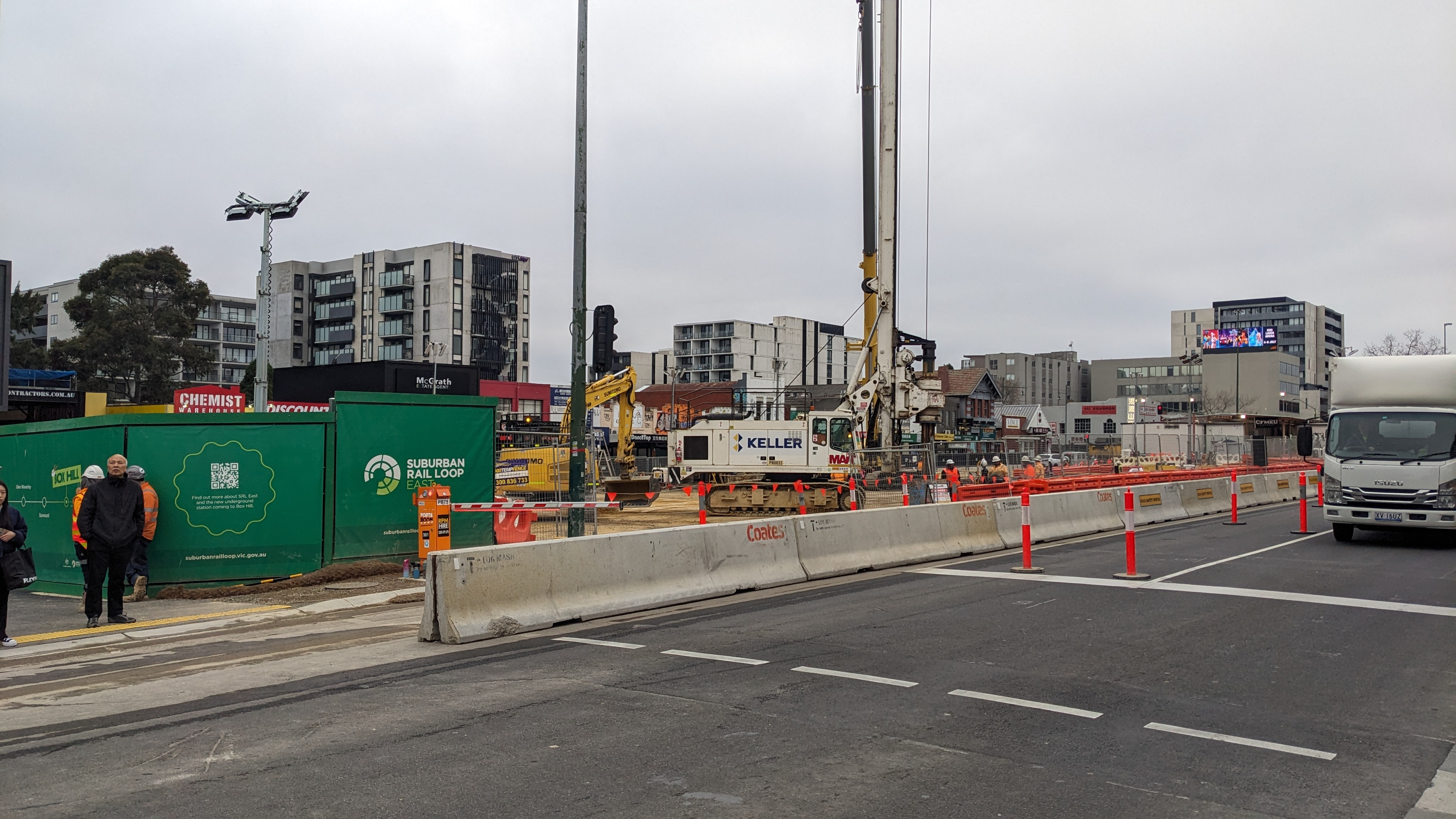
Construction underway for Suburban Rail Loop East in the Whitehorse Road median at Market Street in Box Hill.

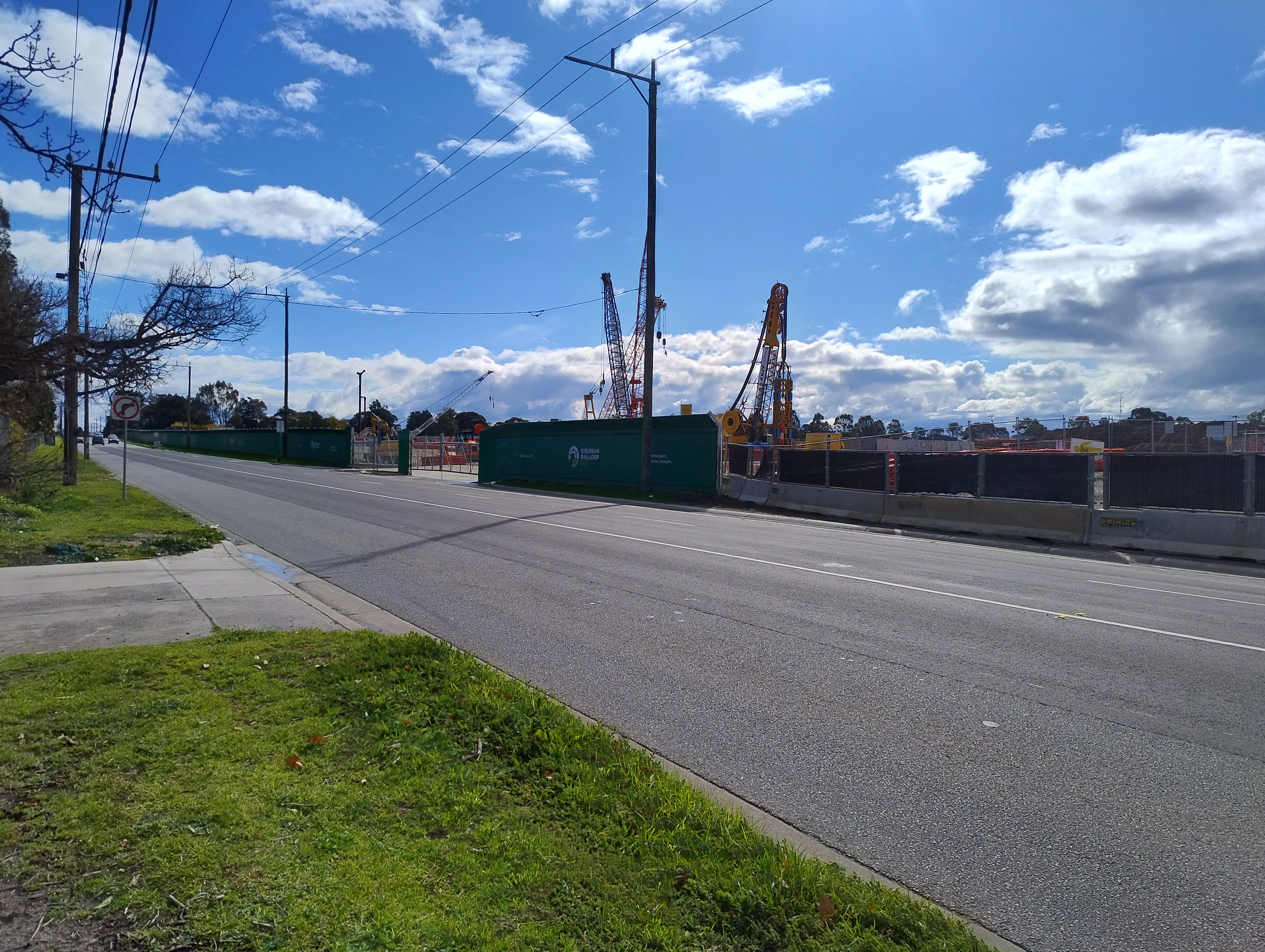
Train stabling facility under construction

In August 2022, the Victorian Environment Minister Lily D'Ambrosio approved the Environment Effects Statement planning process, meaning the project could proceed to other necessary planning approvals and towards major construction. The approval recommended a number of extra actions by the SRLA to minimise impacts to local residents, including replacing open space on the project, limiting construction noise, additional cycling and walking connections, and more support for local businesses.

In August 2023, a preferred bidder was announced for the first package of 16 km (9.9 mi) of SRL East tunnels between Cheltenham and Glen Waverley. The Suburban Connect consortium consisted of CPB Contractors, Ghella and Acciona. The arrival of TBMs and the commencement of tunnelling is expected by 2026. A second contract for the remaining 10 km (6.2 mi) of tunnelling was awarded in July 2024 to Consortium Terra Verde, made up of Webuild, GS Engineering and Construction, and Bouygues. At the same time the state government released a discussion paper for community consultation on precinct plans for the six stations on SRL East.

== Project design ==
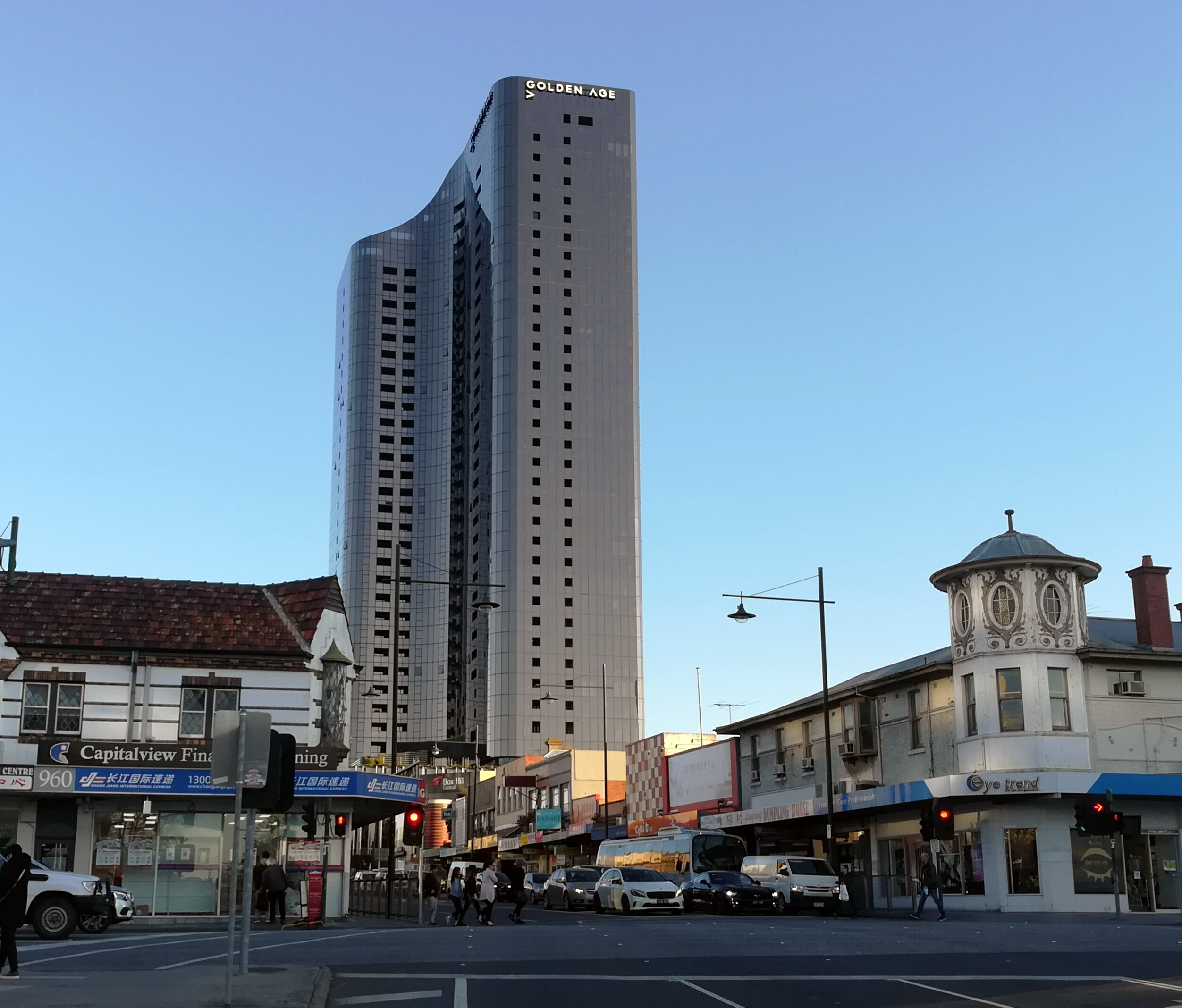
The growth suburb of Box Hill is planned to become an important interchange on the SRL, with shops on the right set to be acquired for construction of the loop.

The 2021 Environmental Effects Statement outlined the key design elements of the project, saying the SRL would provide a high-frequency metro service with fully automated, four-car trains. The trains would be approximately 93 metres (305 ft 1 in) long, 3.2 metres (10 ft 6 in) wide and 4 metres (13 ft 1 in) high, capable of an operating line speed of 100 kilometres per hour (62 mph), running on an alternating current system. This design differs from Melbourne's existing heavy rail system, which uses longer, heavier rolling-stock on a direct current power system.

The project has two initial stages, SRL East and SRL North, which will consist of 13 stations and twin tunnels running 60 km (37 mi) from Cheltenham in the city's south-east to Melbourne Airport in the north-west. The design of a future western stage from the airport to Werribee was not detailed in the project's 2021 business case. SRL East will be the first section to be built, with planning and construction to move immediately onto SRL North. SRL East from Cheltenham to Box Hill is planned to be open by 2035, with SRL North to then open in two stages, the first from Box Hill to Reservoir, and the second from Reservoir to Melbourne Airport.

Stations will be two level, with large concourses and escalators, with interchanges to connecting train and bus services. Stations are also set to include bicycle parking, over-site developments and broader precinct redevelopments. A train stabling and maintenance facility is planned to be built in Heatherton on a former landfill site to accommodate the train fleet for both SRL East and North.

Under state legislation passed in 2021, the Suburban Rail Loop Authority was given planning powers over the area 1.6 km (0.99 mi) from each SRL station. This grants the authority the power to bypass local councils and rezone or develop land in the station precincts, allowing for increased housing and job density, a move that prompted criticism from councils.

== Route ==
SRL East will run between Southland station on the Frankston line and Box Hill station on the Belgrave and Lilydale lines and will be entirely underground along a new alignment. From south to north, SRL East would also include stations at Clayton on the Dandenong rail corridor; Monash University's Clayton campus; Glen Waverley station, the terminus of Glen Waverley line; and Burwood, near the main campus of Deakin University. Government press releases identify Clayton as the location of a "super-hub", allowing interchange between SRL services, frequent Dandenong corridor services, and regional Gippsland line services.

A train stabling and maintenance depot will be built between Southland and Clayton stations in the suburb of Heatherton at the current Kingston Road landfill site. The rail line will briefly surface to enter the depot, which will initially house 13 trains but will be large enough to accommodate 30.

== Planned extension ==
The Suburban Rail Loop North project is planned to extend the line to through the northern suburbs of Melbourne and on to Melbourne Airport with twin tunnels from just north of Box Hill station via Doncaster and under La Trobe University towards Heidelberg, Reservoir, Fawkner and Broadmeadows, before terminating at Melbourne Airport. As of October 2024, only preliminary planning has been done on the project, with construction not expected to commence until the 2030s.

== See also ==
- Sydney Metro Northwest, a similar initiating rapid-transit project in Sydney
- Suburban Rail Loop
- Outer Circle railway line, a former railway line nearby in Melbourne
- Proposed railway extensions in Melbourne
