= Southland railway station =

Railway station in Melbourne, Australia

Southland
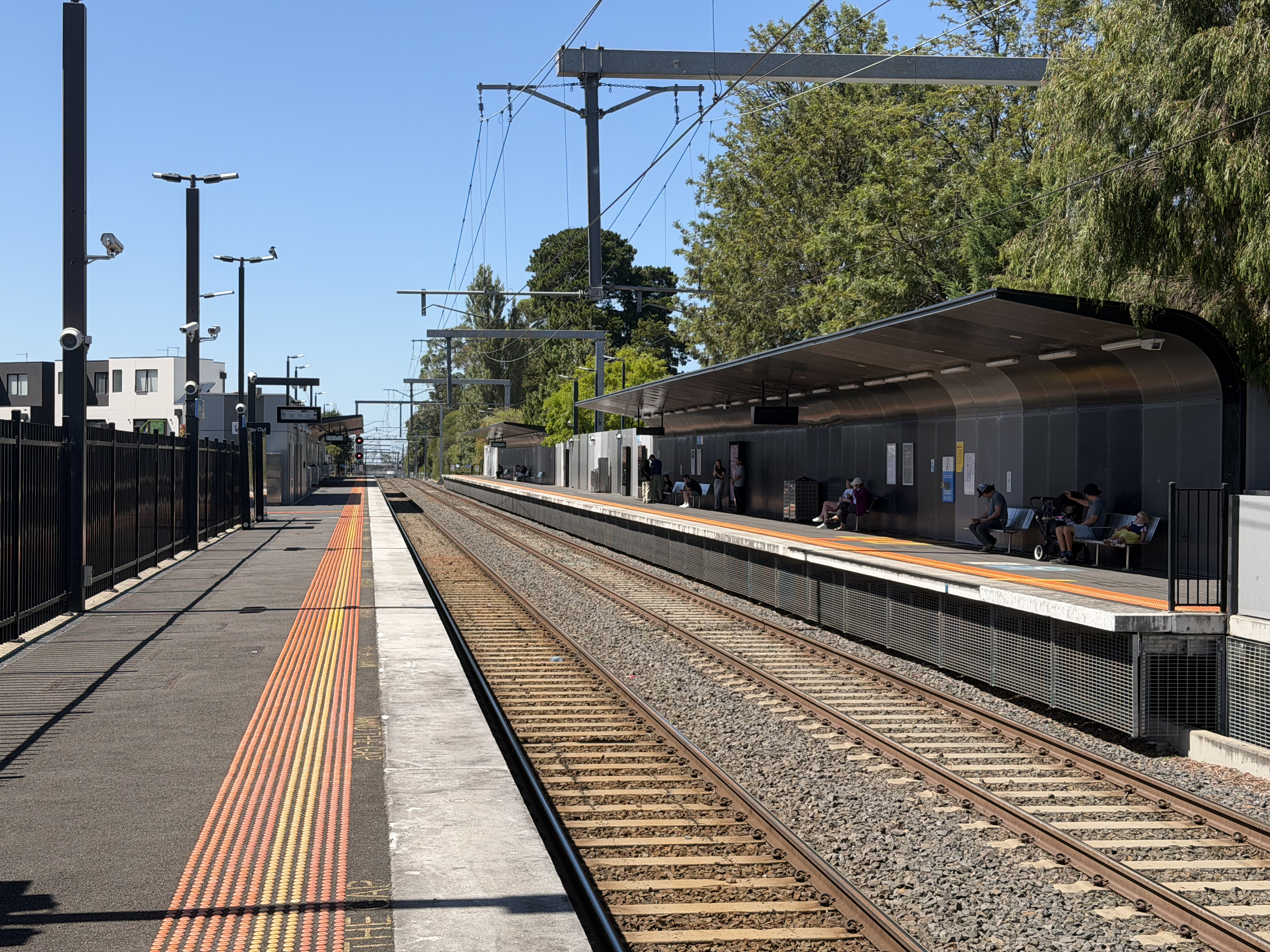
- Southbound view from Platform 2, January 2026

General information
- Location: Bay Road, Cheltenham, Victoria 3192; City of Bayside; City of Kingston; Australia
- Coordinates: 37°57′32″S 145°02′57″E
- System: PTV commuter rail station
- Owner: VicTrack
- Operator: Metro Trains
- Line: Frankston
- Distance: 21.30 kilometres from Southern Cross
- Platforms: 2 side
- Tracks: 2

Construction
- Structure type: At grade
- Parking: Yes
- Cycle facilities: Yes
- Accessible: Yes—step free access

Other information
- Status: Operational, host station
- Station code: SOU
- Fare zone: Myki zone 2
- Website: Public Transport Victoria

History
- Opened: 26 November 2017; 8 years ago
- Electrified: June 1922 (1500 V DC overhead)

Passengers
- 2017–2018: 300,167
- 2018–2019: 557,650 ▲85.8%
- 2019–2020: 441,650 ▼20.8%
- 2020–2021: 277,000 ▼37.3%
- 2021–2022: 298,200 ▲7.65%

Services
Preceding station	Metro Trains	Following station
Highett towards Flinders Street via City Loop	Frankston line	Cheltenham towards Frankston
Future services
Preceding station	Metro Trains	Following station
Terminus	Suburban Rail Loop East (under construction)	Clayton towards Box Hill
Track layout
Location

Southland station is a railway station operated by Metro Trains Melbourne on the Frankston line, part of the Melbourne rail network. It serves the south-eastern suburb of Cheltenham, in Melbourne, Victoria, Australia. Southland station is a ground-level host station, featuring two side platforms. It opened on 26 November 2017.

== History ==
=== 19th century ===
The first proposal for a railway station between Highett and Cheltenham, at Bay Road, occurred during the construction of the Frankston line in the early 1880s. The push was led by the Shire of Moorabbin, whose president for some of that decade was Thomas Bent, a land developer and, later, Premier of Victoria. Agitation continued through the 1880s, but was discontinued in the early 1890s, by which time the shire's attention had to be directed to a major economic crisis.

=== 20th century ===
==== Bay Road signal box ====
On 22 April 1956, as part of the opening and commissioning of a new dock platform at Cheltenham, a new signal box was built and opened at Bay Road, on the eastern side towards Highett. The signal box was named the 'Bay Road signal box'. This signal box controlled all signals between Highett and the up end of Cheltenham station. Control however did not include the crossover or dock platform turnout at Cheltenham. This signal control replaced double line block signalling which had previously been used on this section of line.

The signal box was abolished and closed on 10 December 1973 when three position signalling was provided between Highett and Carrum. The signal box was replaced by an enlarged panel within the Cheltenham station building.

==== 1960s ====
When Westfield Southland (then known as Southland Shopping Centre) opened in September 1968, discussions were raised on whether a railway station would be built on the Frankston line, adjacent to land then-occupied by the St John of God Home for Boys. Despite this, plans were not submitted.

==== 1990s ====
The proposal arose again in 1990, by this stage, almost 110 years after the initial idea was established. This was in conjunction with the redevelopment of Westfield Southland, which was expanded across the Nepean Highway to land adjacent to the Frankston line. The Public Transport Corporation wrote a letter to the City of Moorabbin, responding to suggestions that Cheltenham station should be relocated, stating that the project would be infeasible. The Public Transport Users Association predicted that the redevelopment of Westfield Southland would create traffic congestion unless a new railway station was built. Although plans had been discussed, the proposal was once again moot.

=== 21st century ===
==== 2000s ====
During the Victorian Election campaign in November 2002, the Labor State Government announced their intentions of implementing a feasibility study into the possibility of a station at Southland. The Cheltenham Chamber of Commerce expressed disapproval of these plans, fearing that the station would "kill" the nearby businesses on Charman Road (adjacent to Cheltenham station). Despite this, in 2004, the State Government commenced feasibility works. In 2009, the Victorian Employers' Chamber of Commerce and Industry listed a Southland railway station project as "urgent" and in need of a 2012–2014 completion, to support the population increase in Melbourne over the next 30 years, that would require established suburbs to have improved transport.

==== 2010s ====
Almost 130 years since the original proposal, planning for the station resurfaced in November 2010, during the Victorian state election. Both the government and opposition pledged to construct the railway station during the next term (2010–2014). The Liberal/National Coalition won the 2010 election from the incumbent Labor government.

In the 2011/2012 State Budget, $700,000 was allocated for planning; however, no time frame had been set for the planning of the railway station project. The Department of Transport hosted an online survey on the proposed station entitled "Southland Station Survey"; its benefits and where it will be situated. The City of Kingston and the City of Bayside, alongside the Westfield Group, announced their intention to co-operate together. As a result of the State Government's consultations with both councils, the Government moved on to designing the station with input from the local community in November 2011.

By 2012, the project appeared to be on hold; however, a spokesperson for the State Government claimed that planning for the station was still underway, "which includes identifying the exact location of the station, station layout and access requirements, arrangements for connecting bus services and connections with local roads". According to The Age, the station would not be built during the Liberal government's first term (2010–2014).

Nevertheless, the City of Bayside established a project control group in support of the station and aimed at influencing its development. The City of Kingston, the Department of Planning and Community Development, the Department of Transport, VicRoads and Places Victoria also joined Bayside in establishing the group.

Public Transport Victoria's (PTV) 20-year Network Development Plan, released in March 2013, stated a railway station at Southland would be built within the next five years.

Funding for the station was allocated in the 2013/2014 State Budget. In April 2014, the government announced construction would commence in 2015, with the station to open in 2016. In November 2014, Labor won the state election, resulting in a change of government. By March 2015, plans for the project were renewed and released. Consultation with the community began in March and was completed by May 2015. Construction on the station commenced in August 2016. Since the start of construction, a pedestrian underpass had been constructed joining the two platforms, with construction on the closest platform towards the shopping centre starting in February 2017.

On 26 November 2017, the station opened, and features:

- A pedestrian underpass
- Two side platforms
- Seating and shelters
- Myki vending machine
- Toilets
- CCTV monitoring
- Protective Services Officers (PSO) facilities

== Naming ==
Despite being referred to in public discourse as Southland station since the 1990s redevelopment of the adjacent shopping centre, concerns had been raised about associating a public asset with a privately owned enterprise. Following discussions between stakeholders and the community, Public Transport Victoria confirmed in its February 2016 feedback summary report that the station would be named Southland.

Southland railway station located at the proposed Suburban Rail Loop adjacent to Sir William Fry Reserve.

== Platforms and services ==
Southland has two side platforms. It is serviced by Metro Trains' Frankston line services.

Southland platform arrangement
Platform	Line	Destination	Via	Service Type	Source
1	Frankston line	Flinders Street	City Loop	All stations and limited express services	
2	Frankston line	Frankston, Cheltenham or Carrum		All stations	

== Gallery ==
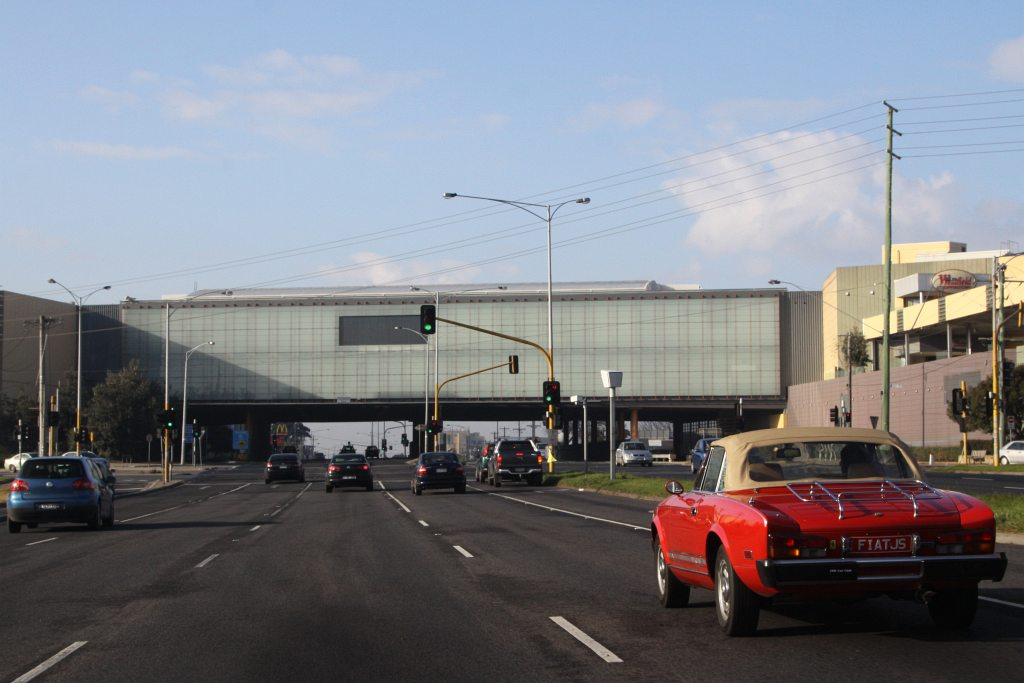
Westfield Southland shopping centre, which crosses over the Nepean Highway, August 2011

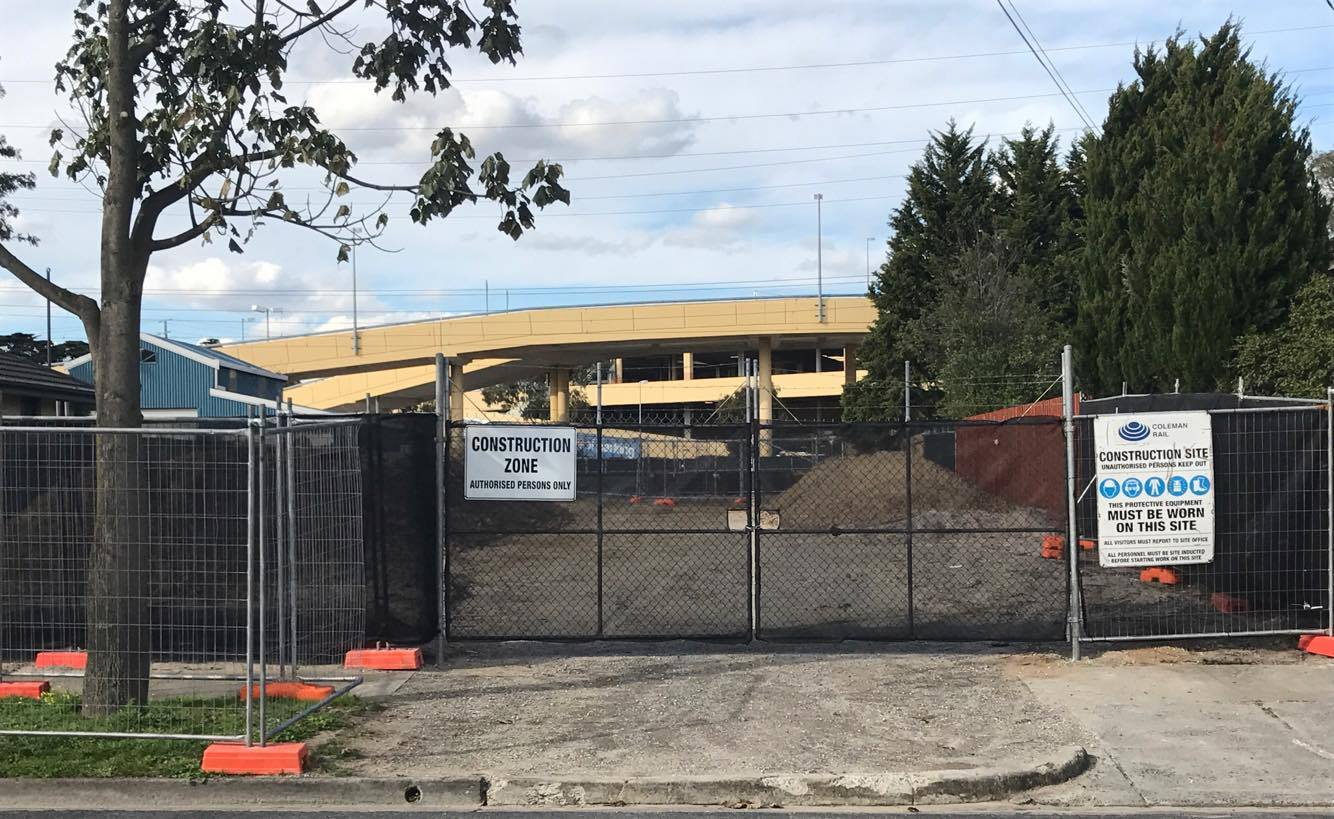
Construction work on the station, as viewed from the proposed rear entrance at 60 Tulip Grove, September 2016
