= Timeline of Melbourne history =

Coordinates: 37.814167°S 144.963056°E

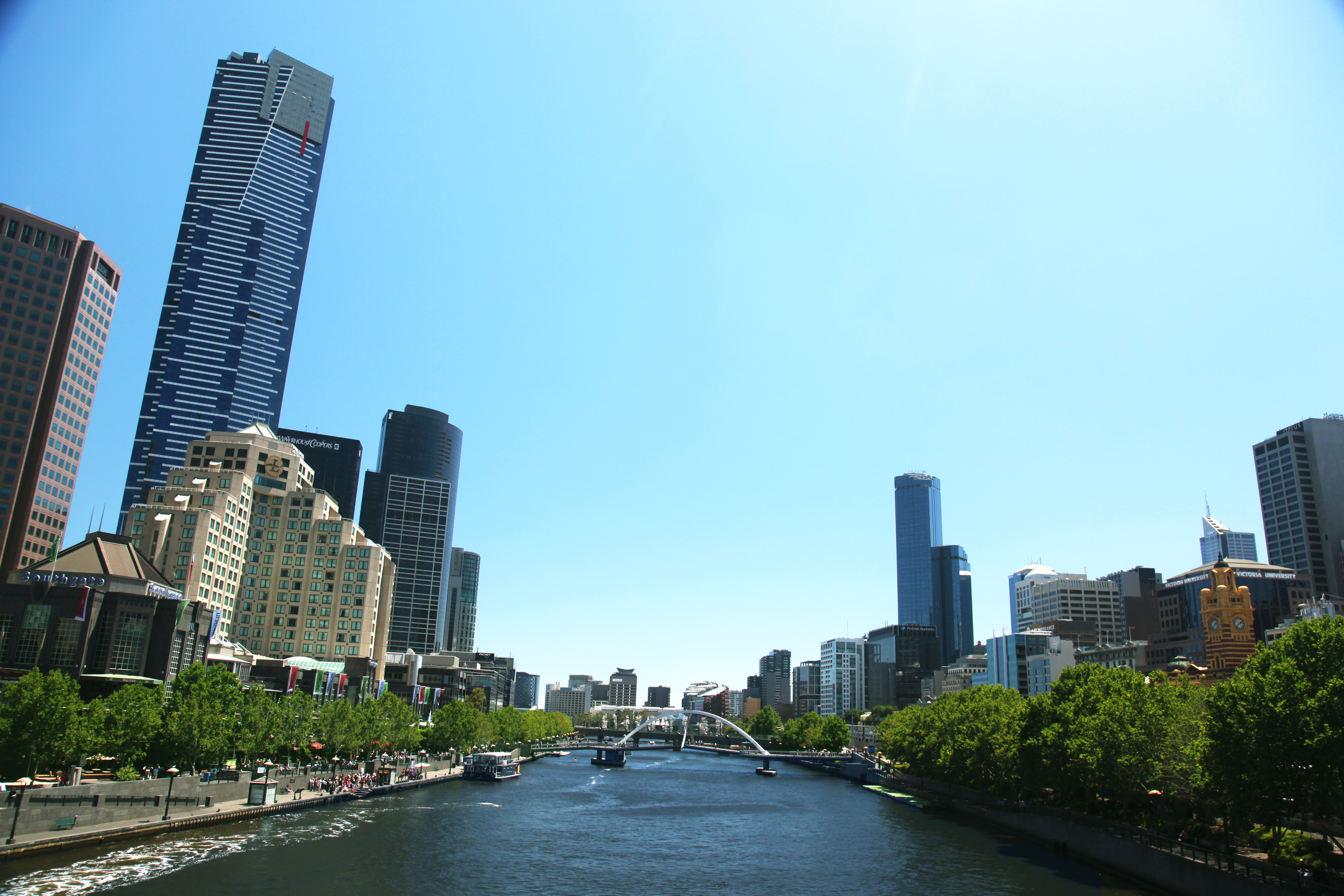
The Melbourne, also known as the settlement skyline, and Yarra River

The following is a timeline of the history of the city of Melbourne, Victoria, Australia.

== Pre-European settlement ==
- Aboriginal Australians settled the area for at least 30,000 years.

== 19th century’s timeline ==
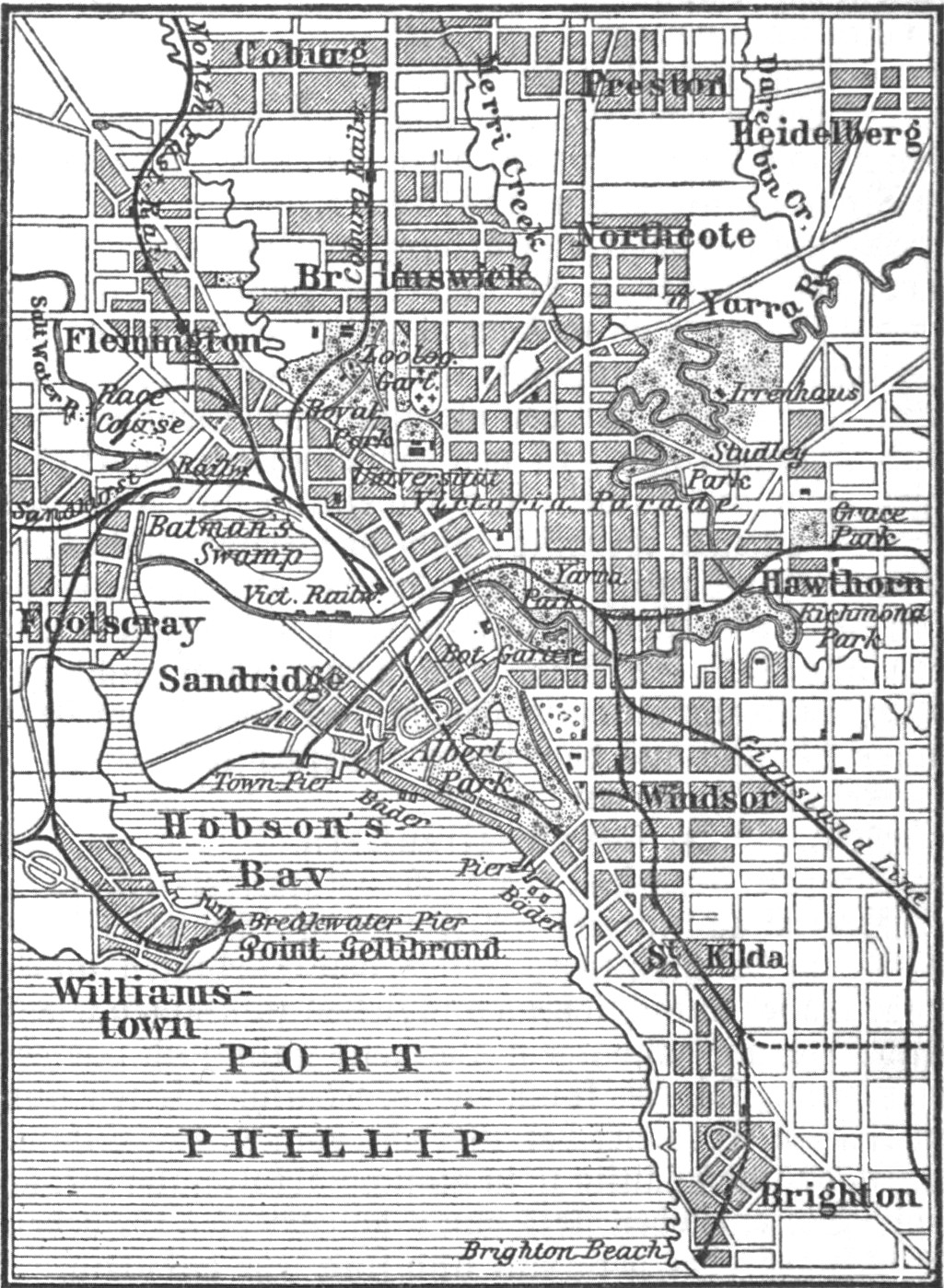
A map dating to the 1880s shows the well-established suburbs of Melbourne.

- 1800 – James Grant explores the south-east of Australia
- 1801 – John Murray sails into Port Phillip in the Lady Nelson
- 1803
  - Charles Robbins and Charles Grimes explore the entirety of Port Phillip and discover the Yarra River in the Cumberland
  - David Collins sent from Sydney to establish a settlement for the British Government. Unaware of previous discoveries, Collins settles near present-day Sullivan Bay on the Mornington Peninsula. This settlement is abandoned five months later.
- 1834 – Henty family establish first long-term European settlement in Victoria at Portland
- 1835
  - John Batman 'buys' the 2,430 km^{2} that Melbourne would be founded on from the local Aboriginal nation, the Wurundjeri. The Batman Deed is now widely recognised to be more of a treaty than a sale.
  - Melbourne is founded by John Batman and John Pascoe Fawkner
- 1836 – William Lonsdale built the first government block, declaring Melbourne the capital of the Port Phillip district
- 1837
  - 28 March – Hoddle Grid of streets for the central business district is surveyed by Robert Hoddle
  - 10 April - Melbourne named by Governor General Richard Bourke
  - 1 June – First inner-city land sale
- 1838
  - Melbourne is declared a legal port and administrative centre, opening the way for vastly increased immigration
  - Melbourne Cricket Club is founded
  - Second inner-city land sale
- 1839 – Third inner-city land sale. Quarrying of bluestone began out of the Melbourne Corporation Quarry at Clifton Hill.
- 1840 – First petition for the separation of Port Phillip District from New South Wales drafted by Henry Fyshe Gisborne and presented to Governor George Gipps.
- 1841 – First seaport and market are opened
- 1842
  - Melbourne Municipal Corporation Act was passed in Sydney. Melbourne City Council is formed.
  - Birth of Saint Mary MacKillop
- 1845 – First Princes Bridge constructed connecting both sides of the Yarra
- 1846 – The Melbourne Botanic Gardens is founded
- 1847
  - Melbourne declared a city by Queen Victoria on 25 June.
  - Melbourne Building Act was proposed in 1847 based on Sydney act of 1833.
- 1848
  - Melbourne Hospital founded (from 1935 the hospital is called The Royal Melbourne Hospital)
  - First Catholic bishop appointed
- 1849 – "Melbourne Building Act" was passed.
- 1851
  - Beginning of the Victorian gold rush with discovery of gold at Buninyong
  - Victoria becomes a colony, separate from New South Wales
  - First state Lieutenant-Governor Charles La Trobe inaugurated
- 1852 – City's first gas works is opened
- 1853 – The University of Melbourne is founded
- 1854
  - The Melbourne Terminus (first Flinders Street station building) is completed and opened.
  - First steam railway journey in Australia from Melbourne Terminus (on the current site of Flinders Street station) to Sandridge (later Port Melbourne)
  - Melbourne Exhibition held in conjunction with Exposition Universelle (1855)
  - The State Library of Victoria is founded
  - First telegraph service, to Williamstown
  - The first Town Hall is completed
- 1855
  - First state Governor Sir Charles Hotham inaugurated
  - The Melbourne Museum is founded
- 1856 – Stonemasons win the eight-hour day
- 1857
  - First reservoir water supply (at Yan Yean Reservoir) tapped outside city limits
  - Queen Victoria Market is founded
  - Victoria's first country railway from Geelong to Melbourne is built
  - City streets first lit by gas lighting
  - Werribee railway station opened.
- 1858
  - 7 August – a game of football played between Melbourne Grammar School and Scotch College
  - First inter-city telegraph services, to Adelaide and Sydney
- 1859
  - 14 May – Melbourne Football Club, Australia's oldest football club, is founded
  - The Balaclava, Batman, train stations are opened.
  - Spencer Street station (then Batman's Hill Station) and Princes Bridge railway station completed
  - Construction of the General Post Office begins
  - First Melbourne Trades Hall building opened.
  - Diggers Rest, Elsternwick, Footscray, Newport, North Brighton, North Melbourne, North Williamstown, Richmond, Spencer Street (later renamed Southern Cross), Sunbury, Williamstown, Windsor and Watergardens railway stations opened.
- 1860
  - Burke & Wills expedition departed from Royal Park.
  - Ascot Vale, East Richmond, Essendon, Kensington, Moonee Ponds, Newmarket, Prahran and South Yarra railway stations opened.
- 1861
  - National Gallery of Victoria is founded
  - First Melbourne Cup
  - Victorian Exhibition held
  - The Young and Jackson Hotel is established.
  - Albion, Brighton Beach, Flemington Racecourse, Hawthorn and Middle Brighton railway stations opened.
  - Melbourne's population reaches 125,000
- 1862 – Melbourne Zoo founded
- 1863 – Batman's Hill levelled
- 1865 – Melbourne overtakes Sydney to become Australia's most populous city
- 1866 – Intercolonial Exhibition of Australasia held
- 1867 – Melbourne Town Hall begins construction
- 1869 – Royal Mint is completed
- 1871
  - Yarraville railway station opened.
- 1872
  - Craigieburn and Roxburgh Park railway stations opened.
- 1873
  - Broadmeadows railway station opened.
- 1874 – Supreme Court building is completed
- 1875 – Victorian Intercolonial Exhibition held
- 1877
  - First Test cricket match, between Australia and England, at the Melbourne Cricket Ground. First season of the Victorian Football Association.
  - Berwick, Dandenong, Oakleigh and Pakenham railway stations opened.
- 1878
  - Xavier College, in Kew, is founded after the increased need of boarding space for the oldest Jesuit School in Melbourne, St Pat's.
  - Ruyton Girls' School, also in Kew is founded by Charlotte Anderson. Its land includes the heritage listed Henty House, built by the seminal Hentys of Sussex.
  - Spotswood railway station opened.
- 1879
  - Armadale, Beaconsfield, Carnegie, Caulfield, Hawksburn, Malvern, Murrumbeena and Toorak railway stations opened.
- 1880
  - Ned Kelly hanged in Melbourne Gaol
  - Royal Exhibition Building opened
  - Melbourne International Exhibition held
  - Burnley, Clayton, Hallam and Springvale railway stations opened.
- 1881
  - Benteligh, Cheltenham, Glen Huntly, Highett, Mentone, Moorabbin, Mordialloc, Officer, Ormond, train stations are opened.
- 1882
  - Auburn, Blackburn, Box Hill, Camberwell, Canterbury, Carrum, Croydon, Frankston, Glenferrie, Lilydale, Mitcham, Narre Warren and Ringwood railway stations opened.
- 1883
  - Historic Yarra-Yarra Falls (near Queens Bridge) removed using explosives
  - Showgrounds railway station opened.
- 1884
  - Victorian International Exhibition held
  - Brunswick, Coburg, Jewell, McKinnon, Moreland and Royal Park railway stations opened.
- 1885
  - First cable tram line opens in the Melbourne cable tramway system
  - Victorians' Jubilee Exhibition
  - Flemington Bridge, Pascoe Vale and Sunshine railway stations opened.
- 1886
  - Laverton railway station opened.
- 1887
  - Melbourne Town Hall is completed
  - Glenroy, Hampton, Macaulay, Mooroolbark, Sandringham and St Albans railway stations opened.
- 1888
  - Victorian Juvenile Industrial Exhibition and Centennial International Exhibition held
  - Alphington, Altona, Baxter, Clifton Hill, Cranbourne, Fairfield, Ferntree Gully, Heidelberg, Ivanhoe, Nunawading, Preston, Regent, Reservoir, Victoria Park, West Footscray and Westgarth railway stations opened.
- 1889
  - Bayswater, Bell, Bittern, Crib Point, Croxton, Epping, Fawkner, Hastings, Merlynston, Mernda, Merri, Northcote, Sandown Park, Somerville, Stony Point, Thomastown, Thornbury, Tyabb, Upfield, Upper Ferntree Gully and Williamstown Beach railway stations opened.
- 1890
  - Melbourne and Metropolitan Board of Works is formed
  - Ashburton, Burwood, Darling, Gardiner, Glen Iris, Heyington, Kooyong, Riversdale, Strathmore and Tooronga railway stations opened.
- 1891
  - Aspendale, South Kensington and Tottenham railway stations opened.
- 1894 – City streets first lit by electric lighting
- 1897
  - First season of the Victorian Football League
  - First part of the mains sewage system becomes operational

== 20th century ==
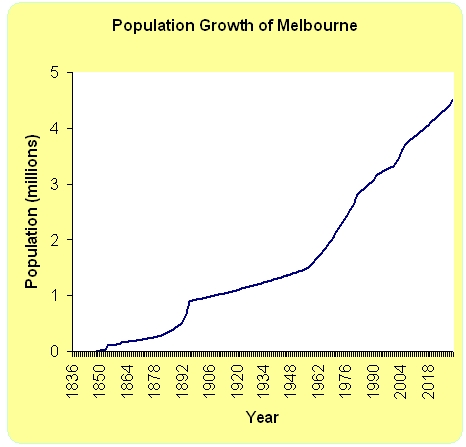
Chart of Melbourne's population growth since first settlement in 1851

- 1900
  - Upper Ferntree Gully to Gembrook narrow-gauge railway (now Puffing Billy Railway) opens
  - Construction of the current Flinders Street station building begins
  - Belgrave and East Camberwell railway stations opened.
- 1901
  - Commonwealth of Australia is formed. Melbourne becomes national capital
  - Collingwood, Jolimont, North Richmond, Upwey and West Richmond railway stations opened.
- 1902
  - Sydney reclaims title from Melbourne as Australia's most populous city
  - Eltham and Greensborough railway stations opened.
- 1903 – City Baths are opened
- 1905
  - First Australian Open championship
  - Melbourne Continuation School, Victoria's first state secondary school, is founded in Spring Street
- 1906
  - First electric tram service commences
  - Gardenvale, Hartwell, Middle Footscray and Seddon railway stations opened.
- 1907
  - The General Post Office is completed
  - Chelsea railway station opened.
- 1908
  - Willison railway station opened.
- 1910 – Current Flinders Street station building is completed
- 1911
  - Macleod railway station opened.
- 1912
  - Diamond Creek, Hurstbridge, Ripponlea and Wattle Glen railway stations opened.
- 1913
  - The Domed Reading Room of the State Library is opened
  - Noble Park and Seaford railway stations opened.
- 1916
  - Strict height limit of 132 feet (40 metres) imposed on all buildings
  - Introduction of 6:00pm closing for all hotels (abolished in 1966)
- 1919
  - Electric suburban train services commence on the Broadmeadows line
  - Edithvale and Parkdale railway stations opened.
- 1920
  - Boronia and Seaholme railway stations opened.
- 1922
  - Darebin, Glenbervie and Montmorency railway stations opened.
- 1923
  - W-class trams introduced.
  - 1923 Victorian Police strike
- 1924
  - First radio station 3AR (now known as Radio National.)
  - Dennis and Tecoma railway stations opened.
- 1925
  - Hughesdale and Ringwood East railway stations opened.
- 1926
  - Anstey, Eaglemont and Heathmont railway stations opened.
- 1927
  - Federal Parliament is moved to Canberra, the new national capital
  - Aircraft, Bonbeach, Chatham, Huntingdale, Rosanna and Rushall railway stations opened.
- 1928
  - Melbourne City Council installs the city's first set of traffic lights at Collins & Swanston Streets
  - Gowrie railway station opened.
- 1929
  - East Malvern and Keon Park railway stations opened.
- 1930
  - Glen Waverley, Holmesglen, Jordanville, Mount Waverley and Syndal railway stations opened.
- 1934
  - Centenary of Melbourne
  - Shrine of Remembrance completed and dedicated.

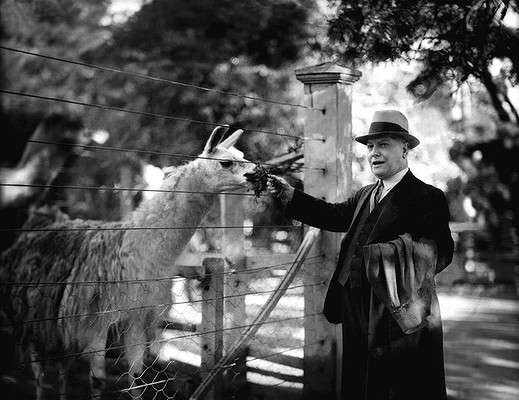
The President of the Zoological Board, feeding a llama, 1937 at the Melbourne Zoo

- 1940 – Last cable tram service ends operation
- 1943 – Russell Street Police Headquarters building is completed
- 1948
  - Alamein railway station opened.
- 1949
  - Lalor railway station opened.
- 1951
  - Westall railway station opened.
- 1954
  - April—Victorian Railways closes the Upper Ferntree Gully to Gembrook narrow-gauge railway (now Puffing Billy Railway)
  - First Moomba parade
  - Proposal to demolish much of East Melbourne and Jolimont Yard to make way for an inner city ringroad.
- 1955
  - City's first parking meters are installed
  - ICI building given special exception from CBD height limits
- 1956
  - First television station HSV-7
  - Olympic Games held in Melbourne
  - Oak Park railway station opened.
- 1957 – Plot ratio height limits introduced to CBD (dependent upon floor space and light angles), plazas and open space. By laws introduced for compulsory carspace for all new city buildings. 1.45 m setbacks for 'Little' streets introduced to widen footpaths.
- 1958
  - Heatherdale and Laburnum railway station opened.
- 1959
  - Sidney Myer Music Bowl opened
  - Jacana and Leawarra railway station opened.
- 1960
  - Morradoo railway station opened.
- 1961
  - Proposal to demolish Flinders Street station and replace it with office blocks.
  - Patterson railway station opened.
- 1962 – Puffing Billy Railway is re-opened as a tourist attraction
- 1963
  - Death of Archbishop Mannix aged 99.
  - Ruthven railway station opened.
- 1966 – Abolition of 6:00pm closing of hotels (introduced in 1916)
- 1967 – first woman city councillor Clare Cascarret
- 1969 – Proposal to demolish the Regent Theatre for multi-storey development.
- 1970
  - Green Bans begin in Carlton, and are led by Norm Gallagher. Green Bans would later be applied to the City Baths, Flinders Street Station, Hotel Windsor, Newport Power Station, the Old Treasury Building, Princess Theatre, Queen Victoria Market, Regent Theatre, the Royal Botanical Gardens, Royal Parade and St Patrick's Cathedral, among many other locations.
  - (15 October) 35 construction workers die when a span of the West Gate Bridge collapses
  - Hoppers Crossing railway station opened.
- 1974 – Underground City Loop construction begins
- 1975
  - Z-class tram introduced
  - 1 March, Colour television introduced.
  - Kananook railway station opened.
- 1976
  - Yarraman railway station opened.
- 1978
  - West Gate Bridge opened to the public after 10 years of construction
- 1979 – Workers at the Union Carbide-owned Altona Petrochemical Plant take control of the workplace for 52 days in protest of their firing.
- 1981
  - Melbourne Central railway station opened..
- 1982
  - City Loop subway opened
  - Ginifer railway station opened.
- 1983
  - (8 February) Melbourne dust storm and (16 February) Ash Wednesday fires occur
  - Melbourne Fringe Festival founded
  - Parliament railway station opened.
- 1985
  - B-class trams introduced
  - Flagstaff and Westona railway stations opened.
- 1986
  - Car-bombing outside the Russell Street Police Headquarters kills one police officer
  - Rialto Towers completed and becomes the city's tallest building as well as the tallest in the southern hemisphere
  - Pablo Picasso's The Weeping Woman is stolen from National Gallery of Victoria by activists. Returned a week later.
  - Melbourne International Arts Festival founded
- 1987
  - Hoddle Street Massacre, killing 7 and injuring 19.
  - Queen Street Massacre, killing 8 and injuring 5.
  - Port Melbourne and St Kilda train lines are converted to light rail
- 1990
  - Tram drivers across the city go on strike and attempt to implement workers control in the Tram network.
  - Southbank Promenade opens, paving the way for urban renewal in Southbank
- 1991 – Melbourne experiences a severe economic slump; City property markets crash and CBD vacancy rates reach all-time high.
- 1992
  - Pedestrianisation of Swanston Street creates Swanston Street Walk
  - Postcode 3000 policy attracts residents to the city centre, warehouses and offices are converted into apartments and CBD vacancy rates drop
- 1994
  - Opening of the Melbourne Observation Deck in Rialto Towers
  - Tasty nightclub raid
- 1995
  - Host City to the World Police & Fire Games
  - Merinda Park railway station opened.
- 1996
  - Development of the Docklands area begins
  - Construction of the CityLink freeways begins
  - Melbourne Convention & Exhibition Centre opens
  - Melbourne hosts its first Australian Grand Prix at the Albert Park Circuit
- 1997 – Crown Melbourne, Melbourne's first gambling centre opens
- 1999 – Bolte Bridge opens for traffic

== 21st century ==
- 2000
  - New Melbourne Museum opened
  - CityLink freeways open, including two new tunnels, a new cross-harbour bridge, and electronic tolling
  - Docklands Stadium completed
- 2002
  - Federation Square opens
  - Controversial Melbourne 2030 planning policy introduced, aimed to increase population in designated 'activity centres' and curb urban sprawl, promises to increase public transport usage to 20% of motorised trips by 2020
  - Keilor Plains railway station opened.
- 2003 – 2003 Melbourne Thunderstorm
- 2004 – Melbourne Victory FC is formed
- 2005 – 2005 Melbourne Thunderstorm
- 2006
  - Southern Cross railway station redevelopment opens to passengers, renamed from Spencer Street station
  - Commonwealth Games held in Melbourne
  - Construction on Eureka Tower is completed, making it the tallest building in Melbourne until 2020 and tallest observation deck in the Southern Hemisphere.
- 2007 – 2007 FINA Swimming World Championships are held
- 2008
  - New Eastlink freeway completed
  - M1 upgrade begins
- 2009
  - Black Saturday bushfires around Melbourne, the worst fires in the history of the city leave 180 people dead
  - Melbourne Heart FC is formed
  - Melbourne's population reaches 4 million people, expanding by an unprecedented 90,000 people a year
- 2010
  - Severe Thunderstorm 6 March, once in a century storm with 10 cm hail stones
  - Melbourne celebrates 175th birthday
  - Coolaroo railway station opened.
- 2011 – Say Yes demonstrations draw 10,000 people who support increased investment in renewable energy

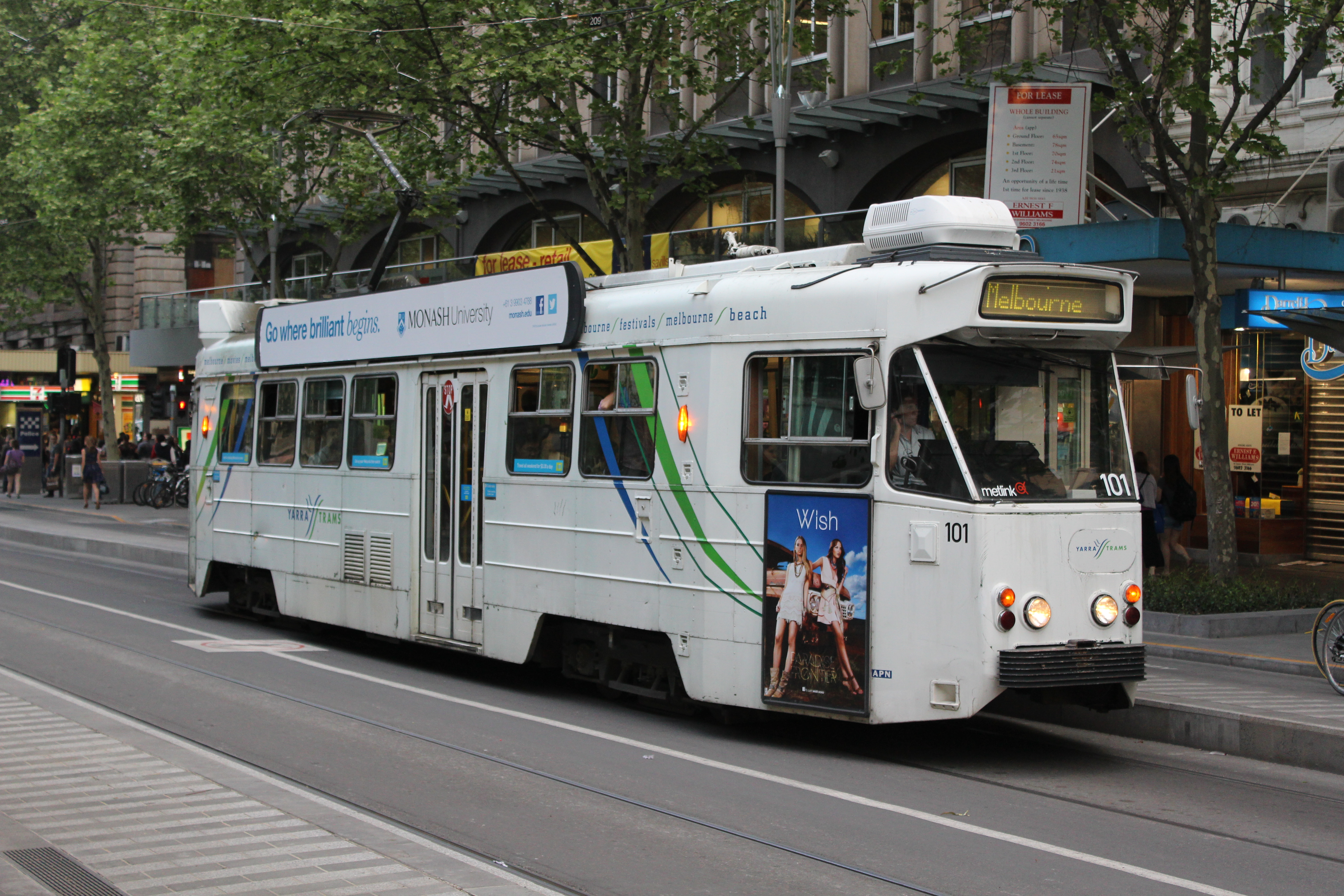
A Melbourne tram on Swanston Street in October 2012.

- 2012
  - Cardinia Road, Lynbrook and South Morang railway stations opened.
- 2013
  - Williams Landing railway station opened.
- 2015 – Construction commences on Australia 108 which, once complete, will be the tallest building in Melbourne
- 2017
  - Six people were killed and thirty wounded in the January 2017 Bourke St car attack, followed by the death of one person and the injury of seventeen in the December 2017 Flinders St car attack
  - Southland railway station opened.
- 2018
  - Major construction begins on the Metro Tunnel, a 9-km underground rail tunnel through the CBD and the biggest public transport project since the City Loop
  - Hawkstowe and Middle Gorge railway station opened.
- 2019 – Construction of Aurora Melbourne Central is completed, making it the third tallest building in Melbourne
- 2020
  - Melbourne is hit the hardest by the COVID-19 pandemic in Australia and as a result Melbourne becomes one of the most locked-down cities in the world
  - Australia 108 is built and opened, becoming the tallest building in Melbourne.
- 2021 – Local newspapers try to claim Melbourne becomes the most locked-down city in the world. There is no evidence for this, and cities such as Leicester in England suffered much worse lockdowns of over a year, while Peru maintained strict controls for far longer. Deaths from COVID19 in Melbourne were very low compared to Europe and the Americas in 2020-21. Minor far right 'cooker' protests against strict lockdowns and mandatory vaccinations in the construction industry broke out throughout the city during the second half of the year. See COVID-19 protests in Australia
- 2023
  - Union railway station opened.
- 2024
  - The Melbourne Land Forces Expo protests occur, the largest deployment of Victoria Police at a protest since 2000.
  - The East Pakenham railway station opened.
- 2025
  - Anzac, Arden, Parkville, State Library and Town Hall railway stations opened as part of the Metro Tunnel project.

== See also ==
- History of Melbourne
