= Seddon, Victoria =

Seddon
- Suburb
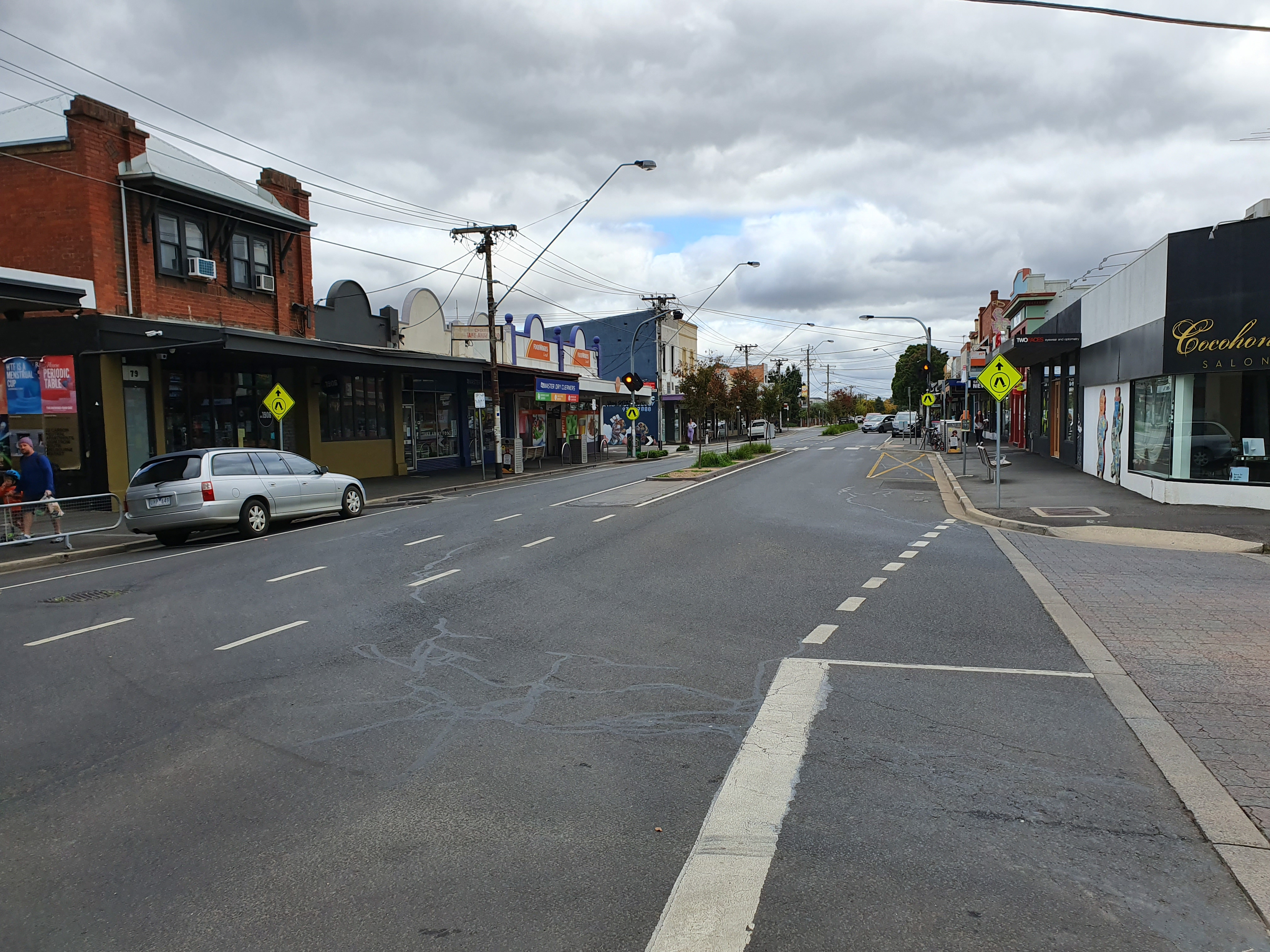
- Charles Street, Seddon c. 2020

- Interactive map of Seddon
- Coordinates: 37°48′36″S 144°53′38″E
- Country: Australia
- State: Victoria
- City: Melbourne
- LGA: City of Maribyrnong
- Location: 7 km (4.3 mi) from Melbourne CBD

Government
  - State electorate: Footscray
  - Federal division: Fraser

Area
  - Total: 0.9 km^{2} (0.35 sq mi)
- Elevation: 24 m (79 ft)

Population
  - Total: 5,143 (2021 census)
  - Density: 5,700/km^{2} (14,800/sq mi)
- Postcode: 3011
Suburbs around Seddon
Footscray	Footscray	Footscray
Kingsville	Seddon	Footscray
Yarraville	Yarraville	Yarraville

Seddon is an inner suburb in Melbourne, Victoria, Australia, 6 km (3.7 mi) west of Melbourne's Central Business District, located within the City of Maribyrnong local government area. Seddon recorded a population of 5,143 at the 2021 census.

Located south of Footscray and north of Yarraville, Seddon was formerly a semi-industrial, working-class suburb. In recent years Seddon has experienced rapid gentrification due to its close proximity to the Melbourne City Centre.

== History ==
Originally known as Belgravia, Seddon was officially declared a suburb in 1906, named after Richard Seddon, the Prime Minister of New Zealand from 1893 to 1906, who resided there before he moved to Bendigo and later to New Zealand.

Seddon was, on occasion, considered part of neighbouring Footscray. The original State Bank of Victoria in Charles Street, Seddon used to stamp its Bank Account passbooks as Footscray South Vic. Not unusual, considering Seddon is south of Footscray. However, while central Footscray is one of the main shopping and transport hubs for Melbourne's western suburbs, Seddon, in contrast, is quiet, leafy and residential.

The main streets of Victoria, Charles and Gamon used to accommodate a tram line that ran through the middle of the Seddon Village. It has since been replaced with central garden beds and tree plantings in the middle of the streets.

Seddon street names were named for monarchs. Reading from west to east, Charles intersects with Alfred, Edward, Henry, James, William, Victoria (which runs parallel to Windsor) and terminates at Albert.

Seddon Post Office opened on 29 September 1908 and closed in 1976. Seddon West Post Office opened in 1924 and has since been renamed to the Seddon Post Office after its relocation further south on Victoria Street. Seddon shares its postcode with neighbouring Footscray – 3011.

== Community organisations ==
The Seddon Community Group with the assistance of the Maribyrnong Council puts on the Seddon Festival each year, closing all the main streets in the village to vehicles for exclusive pedestrian access. Several large band stages are erected on streets throughout the village and traders extend their seating onto the streets for the day. The Seddon Festival plays host to the Seddon Waiters Race, an event in which all of the local cafes and restaurants enter a waiter to compete carrying drinks and food through a short course on the street. The Snapshots of Seddon photography competition is also usually awarded judges prizes at the festival after entrants have had their photos displayed in the windows of the local business for the preceding month for judging of the peoples choice award.

The Seddon Makers Market (formerly Maribyrnong Makers Market) operates throughout the year on the grounds of the Seddon Uniting Church on Gamon Street. Established in 2008, the market is a not-for-profit, community based designer market run by a local volunteer group. The group provides a forum for artists and crafts people to promote and sell handmade wares.

== Sport and activities ==
The Seddon Cricket Club has its home ground in the Yarraville Gardens.

Seddon also shares its Australian Rules football team, Yarraville-Seddon, with neighbouring Yarraville. The team competes in the Western Region Football League.

Opposite Seddon Station is the 5th Footscray Scout Group. With programs for children aged 6 to 15, the group is part of Scouts Australia, and meets in a historic hall built in the 1930s.

== Local landmarks ==
=== Residential architecture ===
Residential Seddon consists predominantly of single storey Victorian 'workers cottages' and Edwardian terrace houses, with some larger double storey early 20th century buildings in the village.

=== Public spaces ===
Seddon features many small gardens, parks and playgrounds scattered throughout the suburb. Harris Reserve is on the corner of Gamon Street and Thomson Street. Bristow Reserve is a favourite among toddlers and barbecue masters alike and is located on the corner of Pilgrim Street and John Street. Mappin Reserve, the largest green space, can be found between Bell Street and Nicholson Street.

== Public transportation ==
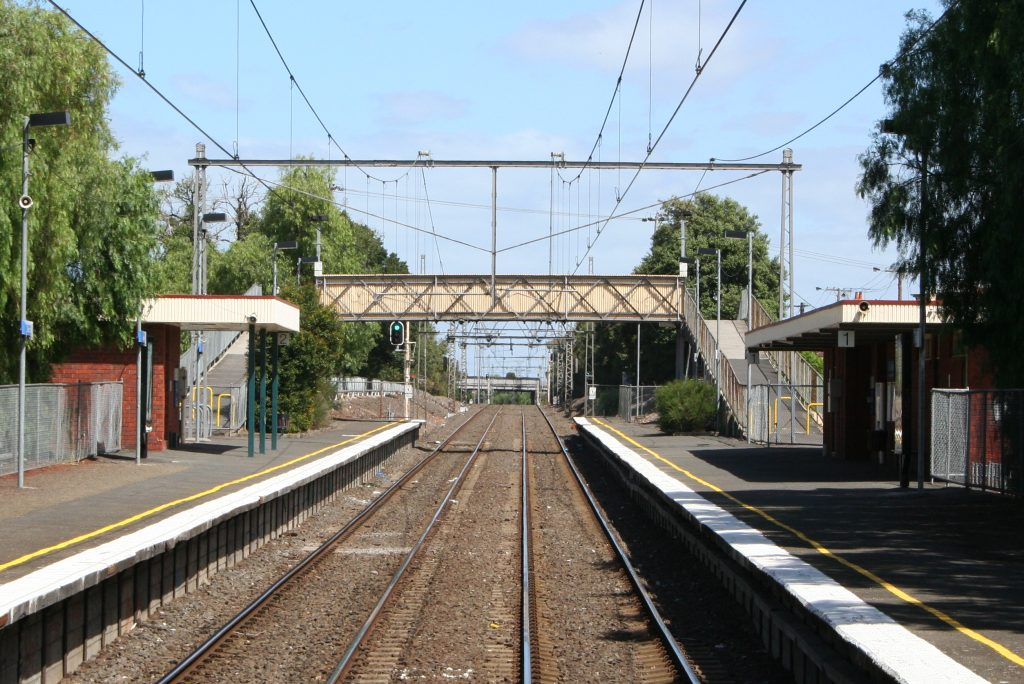
Seddon railway station

Seddon is well-served by rail, with two nearby train stations:

- Seddon on the Werribee and Williamstown railway lines
- Middle Footscray on the Sunbury line

Seddon Village is most closely serviced by Middle Footscray station, as well as bus routes:

- 223 Yarraville ↔ Highpoint SC
- 472 Williamstown ↔ Moonee Ponds via Footscray

== National broadband network ==
Most of Seddon is connected to the National Broadband Network (NBN) via fibre optic cabling, replacing the ageing copper network and providing relief for the Footscray copper exchange.

== See also ==
- City of Footscray – Seddon was previously within this former local government area.
- City of Maribyrnong – Seddon is located within this local government area.
