= Bayswater station =

Bayswater station may refer to:

- Bayswater railway station, Melbourne, in Victoria, Australia
- Bayswater railway station, Perth, in Western Australia
- Bayswater tube station, a railway station situated on the London Underground (tube) network in London, England

See also:

- Spotswood railway station, Melbourne, briefly known as Bayswater in 1881
