= North Williamstown railway station =

Railway station in Melbourne, Australia

North Williamstown
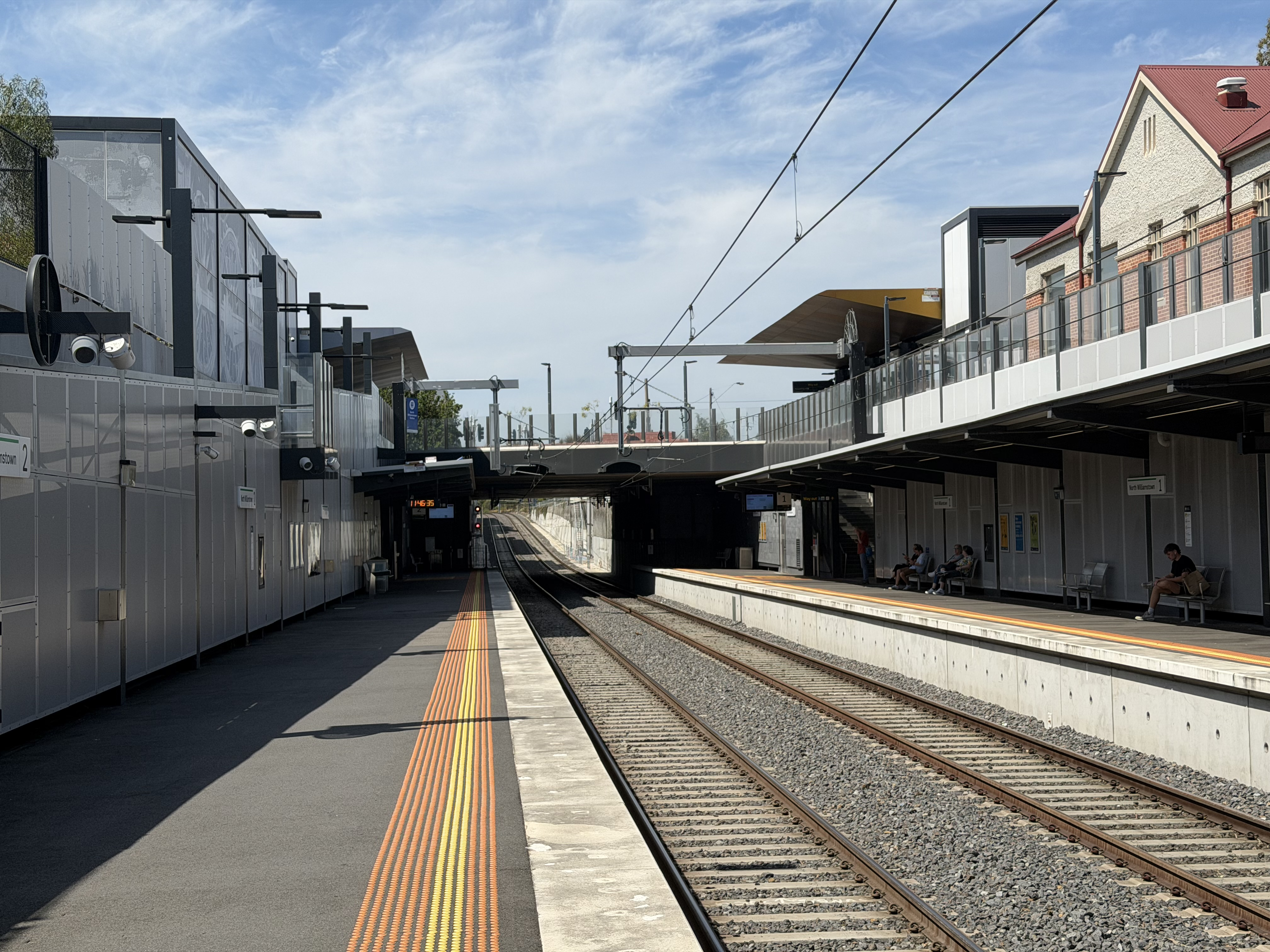
- Southbound view from Platform 2, February 2026

General information
- Location: Champion Road, Newport, Victoria 3015; City of Hobsons Bay; Australia
- Coordinates: 37°51′26″S 144°53′20″E
- System: PTV commuter rail station
- Owner: VicTrack
- Operator: Metro Trains
- Line: Williamstown
- Distance: 12.27 kilometres from Southern Cross
- Platforms: 2 side
- Tracks: 2

Construction
- Structure type: Below ground
- Parking: 10
- Cycle facilities: Yes
- Accessible: Yes—step free access

Other information
- Status: Operational, unstaffed
- Station code: NWN
- Fare zone: Myki zone 1
- Website: Public Transport Victoria

History
- Opened: 1 February 1859; 167 years ago
- Rebuilt: 17 December 2021 (LXRP)
- Electrified: August 1920 (1500 V DC overhead)

Passengers
- 2005–2006: 334,847
- 2006–2007: 374,175 ▲11.74%
- 2007–2008: 415,381 ▲11.01%
- 2008–2009: 385,667 ▼7.15%
- 2009–2010: 385,720 ▲0.01%
- 2010–2011: 354,155 ▼8.18%
- 2011–2012: 336,368 ▼5.02%
- 2012–2013: Not measured
- 2013–2014: 315,770 ▼6.12%
- 2014–2015: 315,868 ▲0.03%
- 2015–2016: 340,769 ▲7.88%
- 2016–2017: 338,911 ▼0.54%
- 2017–2018: 346,005 ▲2.09%
- 2018–2019: 364,606 ▲5.37%
- 2019–2020: 289,450 ▼20.61%
- 2020–2021: 125,500 ▼56.64%
- 2021–2022: 98,800 ▼21.27%

Services
Preceding station	Metro Trains	Following station
Newport towards Sandringham via Flinders Street	Williamstown line	Williamstown Beach towards Williamstown
Newport Terminus	Williamstown line	Williamstown Beach towards Williamstown
Track layout
Location

North Williamstown station is a railway station operated by Metro Trains Melbourne on the Williamstown line, part of the Melbourne rail network. It serves the south-western suburb of Newport, in Melbourne, Victoria, Australia. North Williamstown station is a below ground unstaffed station, featuring two side platforms. It opened on 1 February 1859, with the current station provided in December 2021.

The Newport Railway Museum is located on nearby Champion Road, approximately 200 metres from the station.

== History ==
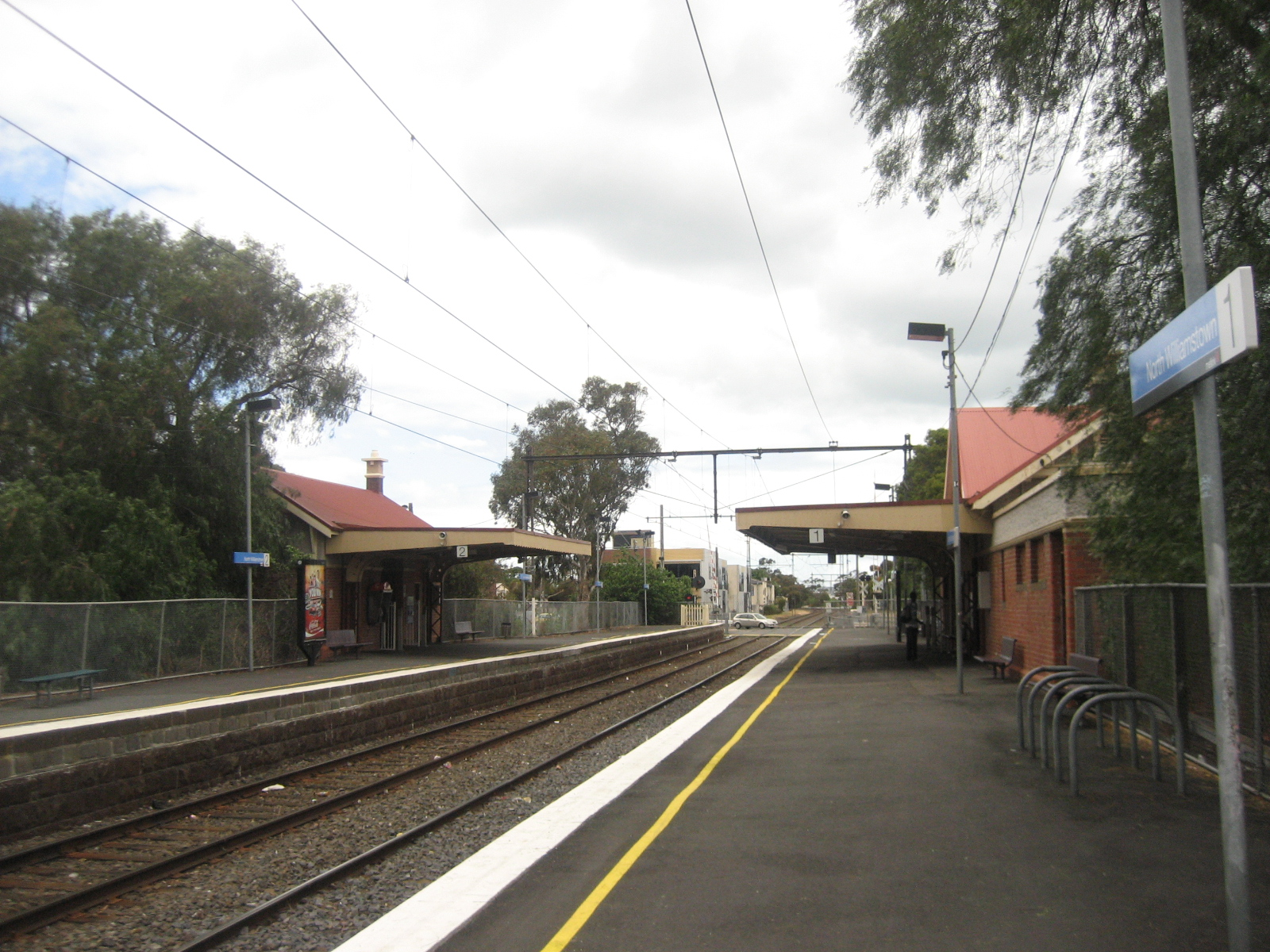
Southbound view of the former ground level Platform 1, November 2008

North Williamstown station opened on 1 February 1859, just under a month after the railway line from Newport was extended to Williamstown Pier.

In 1967, manually operated boom barriers replaced interlocked gates at the former Ferguson Street level crossing, which was located at the down end of the station. In 1969, the boom barriers were converted to automatic operation, and the signal box for the level crossing was abolished.

The land that is located east of the station was once occupied by a strip of historic commercial premises, but is now used as car parking. Various proposals have been made by railway land manager VicTrack to subdivide this land for a high-density residential development.

The level crossing was a part of the first 50 crossings to be grade separated under the original scope of the Level Crossing Removal Project, which was promised by then opposition leader Daniel Andrews at the 2014 state election. In November 2019, the LXRP announced that consultation with the community for the project had started. On 19 June 2020, it was announced that the level crossing will be removed by lowering the railway line under the road, and will include rebuilding the station. On 11 October of that year, designs were released and, in January 2021, contracts were awarded. Major construction began in May 2021, with the station temporary closing on 2 August of that year. On 17 December of that year, the rebuilt station opened to passengers. As part of the project, the station building on Platform 2 was demolished, however the building on Platform 1 was retained for station operations.

== Platforms and services ==
North Williamstown has two side platforms. It is serviced by Metro Trains' Williamstown line services.

=== Current ===
North Williamstown platform arrangement
Platform	Line	Destination	Via	Service Type	Notes	Source
1	Williamstown line	Newport		All stations	Shuttle service, operates during late nights + weekend mornings.	
1	Williamstown line	Flinders Street or Sandringham	Flinders Street	All stations	Services only continue to Sandringham on weekdays.	
2	Williamstown line	Williamstown	All stations	All stations		

== Transport links ==
CDC Melbourne operates one route via North Williamstown station, under contract to Public Transport Victoria:

- 415 : Laverton station – Williamstown

Transit Systems Victoria operates one route via North Williamstown station, under contract to Public Transport Victoria:

- 472 : Williamstown – Moonee Ponds Junction
