= Williamstown Beach railway station =

Railway station in Melbourne, Australia

Williamstown Beach
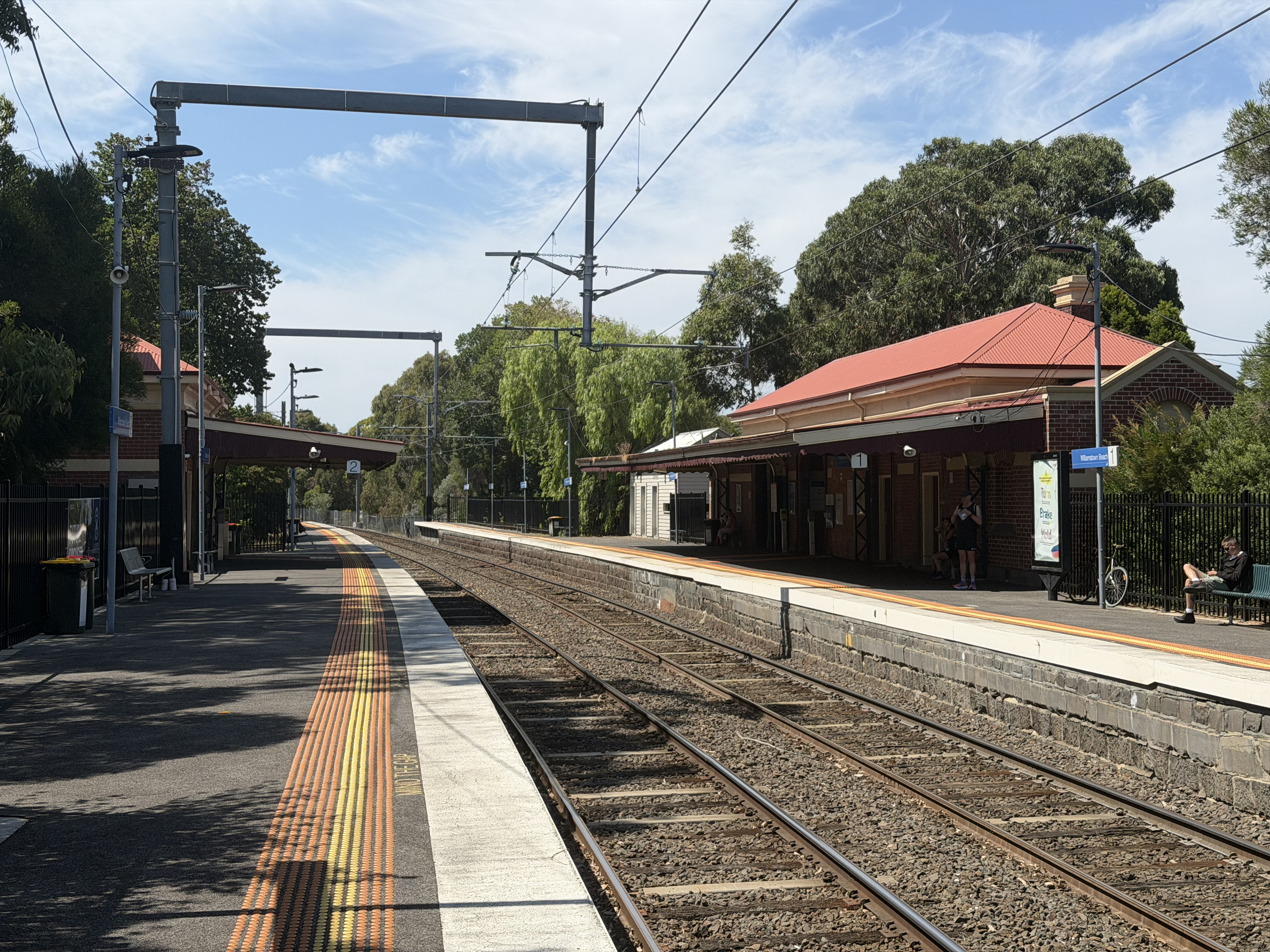
- Southbound view from Platform 2, February 2026

General information
- Location: Railway Crescent, Williamstown, Victoria 3016; City of Hobsons Bay; Australia
- Coordinates: 37°51′51″S 144°53′40″E
- System: PTV commuter rail station
- Owner: VicTrack
- Operator: Metro Trains
- Line: Williamstown
- Distance: 13.18 kilometres from Southern Cross
- Platforms: 2 side
- Tracks: 2

Construction
- Structure type: Ground
- Parking: Yes
- Cycle facilities: Yes
- Accessible: Yes—step free access

Other information
- Status: Operational, unstaffed
- Station code: WBH
- Fare zone: Myki zone 1
- Website: Public Transport Victoria

History
- Opened: 7 August 1889; 137 years ago
- Electrified: August 1920 (1500 V DC overhead)
- Former names: Beach (1889–1915)

Passengers
- 2005–2006: 197,674
- 2006–2007: 225,635 ▲14.14%
- 2007–2008: 240,994 ▲6.8%
- 2008–2009: 138,101 ▼42.69%
- 2009–2010: 136,182 ▼1.38%
- 2010–2011: 131,095 ▼3.73%
- 2011–2012: 132,888 ▲1.36%
- 2012–2013: Not measured
- 2013–2014: 164,425 ▲23.73%
- 2014–2015: 168,566 ▲2.51%
- 2015–2016: 195,732 ▲16.11%
- 2016–2017: 200,610 ▲2.49%
- 2017–2018: 204,428 ▲1.9%
- 2018–2019: 161,900 ▼20.8%
- 2019–2020: 132,850 ▼17.94%
- 2020–2021: 64,100 ▼51.75%
- 2021–2022: 69,250 ▲8.03%

Services
Preceding station	Metro Trains	Following station
North Williamstown towards Sandringham via Flinders Street	Williamstown line	Williamstown Terminus
North Williamstown towards Newport	Williamstown line Shuttle services	Williamstown Terminus
Track layout
Location

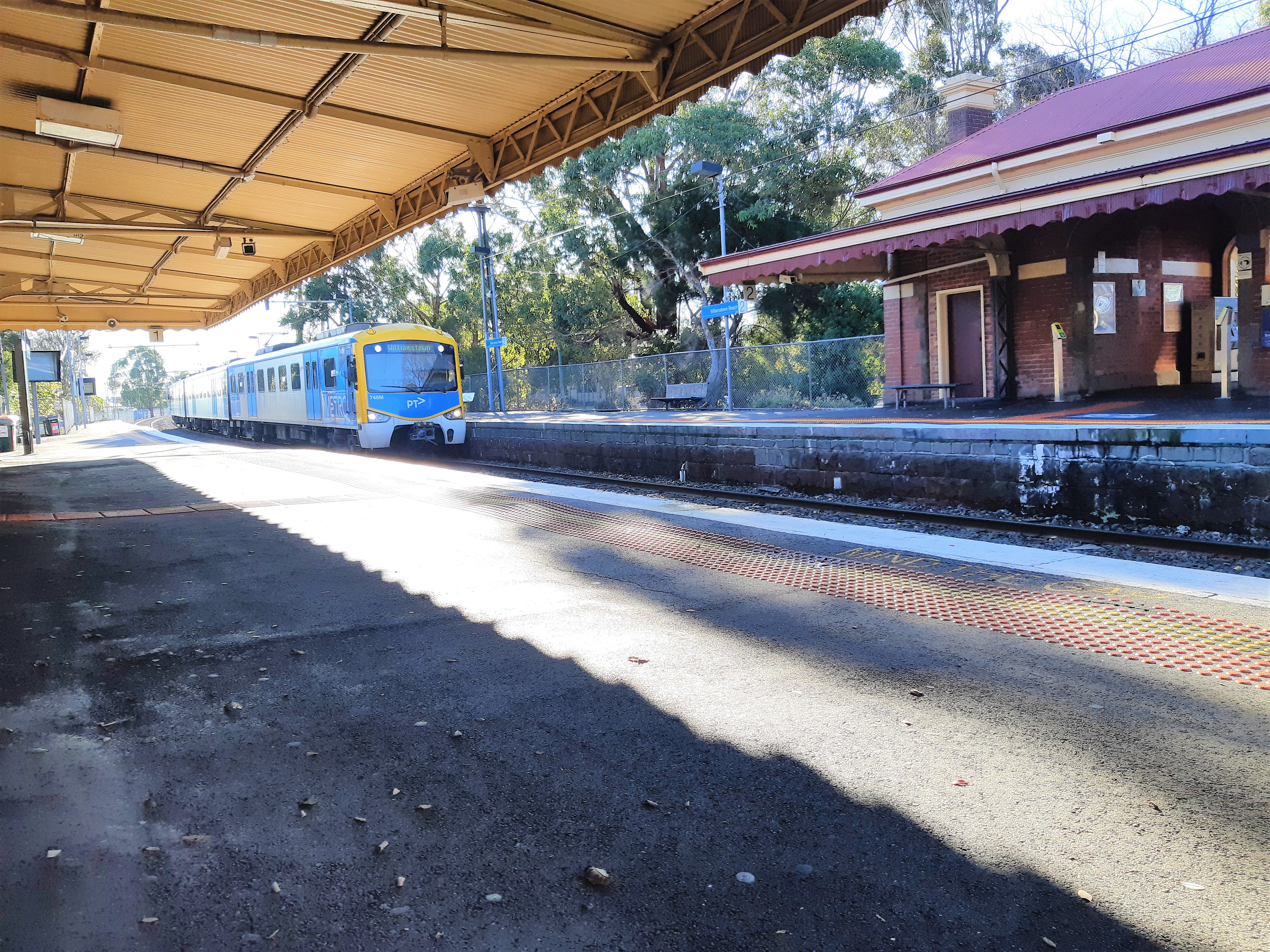
A Siemens Nexas train on a down Williamstown service arrives at Platform 2, June 2019

Williamstown Beach station is a railway station operated by Metro Trains Melbourne on the Williamstown line, part of the Melbourne rail network. It serves the western suburb of Williamstown, in Melbourne, Victoria, Australia. Williamstown Beach station is a ground level unstaffed station, featuring two side platforms. It opened on 7 August 1889.

Initially opened as Beach, the station was given its current name of Williamstown Beach on 1 February 1915.

In 1961, boom barriers replaced hand gates at the Giffard Street level crossing, located nearby in the down direction of the station. In 1965, a number of sidings, points and signals at the station were abolished.

== Platforms and services ==
Williamstown Beach has two side platforms. It is serviced by Metro Trains' Williamstown line services.

=== Current ===
Williamstown Beach platform arrangement
Platform	Line	Destination	Via	Service Type	Notes	Source
1	Williamstown line	Newport		All stations	Shuttle service, operates during late nights + weekend mornings.	
1	Williamstown line	Flinders Street or Sandringham	Flinders Street	All stations	Services only continue to Sandringham on weekdays.	
2	Williamstown line	Williamstown		All stations		

== Transport links ==
- 471 : Williamstown – Sunshine station
