= Yarraville railway station =

Railway station in Melbourne, Australia

Yarraville
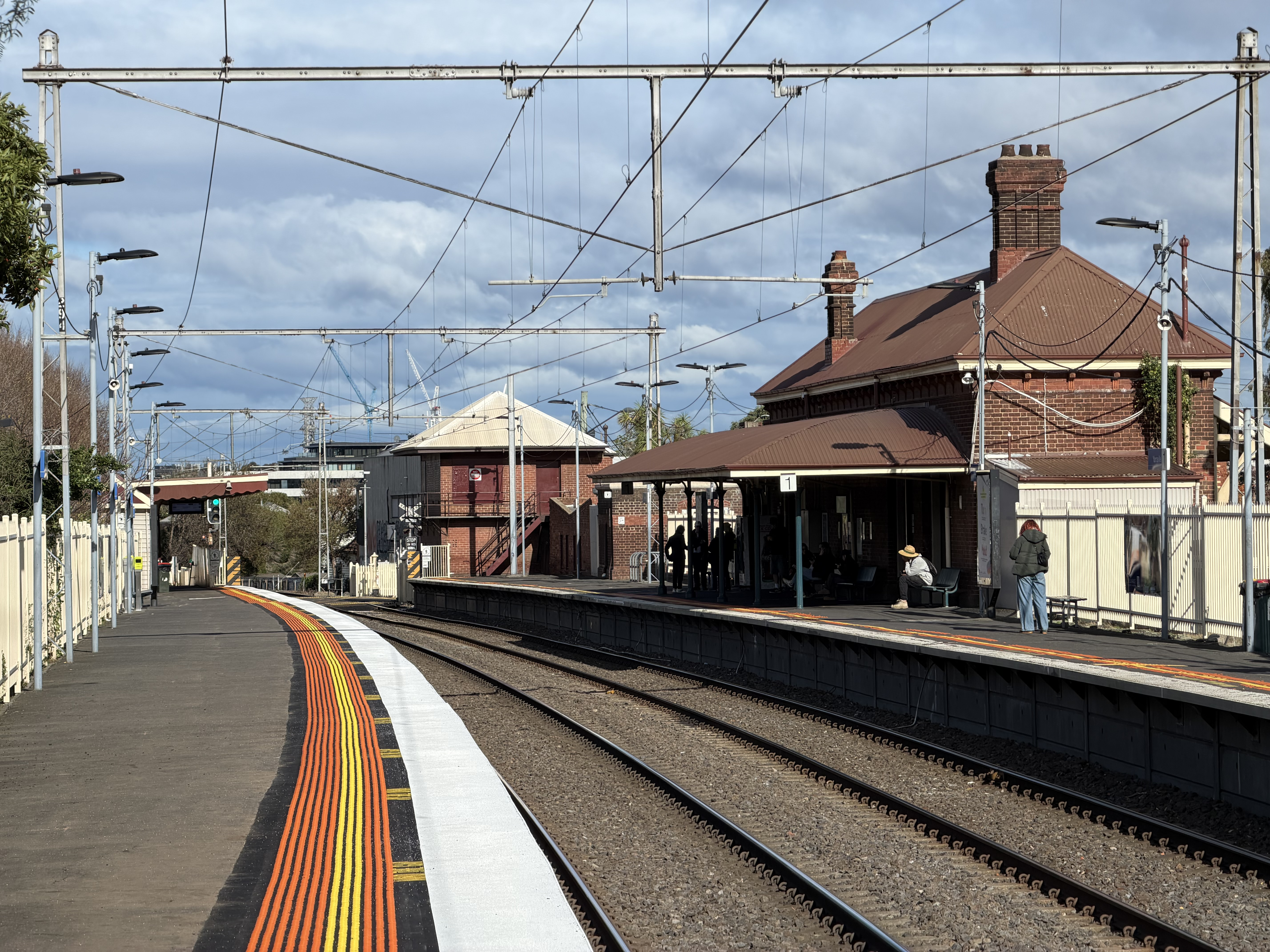
- Southbound view from Platform 2, June 2026

General information
- Location: Birmingham Street, Yarraville, Victoria 3013; City of Maribyrnong; Australia
- Coordinates: 37°48′59″S 144°53′23″E
- System: PTV commuter rail station
- Owner: VicTrack
- Operator: Metro Trains
- Lines: Werribee; Williamstown
- Distance: 7.54 kilometres from Southern Cross
- Platforms: 2 side
- Tracks: 2
- Connections: Bus

Construction
- Structure type: Ground
- Parking: 25
- Cycle facilities: Yes
- Accessible: Yes—step free access

Other information
- Status: Operational, host station
- Station code: YVE
- Fare zone: Myki zone 1
- Website: Public Transport Victoria

History
- Opened: 20 November 1871; 154 years ago
- Electrified: August 1920 (1500 V DC overhead)
- Former names: South Footscray

Passengers
- 2005–2006: 608,134
- 2006–2007: 658,353 ▲8.25%
- 2007–2008: 751,869 ▲14.2%
- 2008–2009: 843,157 ▲12.14%
- 2009–2010: 846,625 ▲0.41%
- 2010–2011: 886,215 ▲4.67%
- 2011–2012: 876,868 ▼1.05%
- 2012–2013: Not measured
- 2013–2014: 906,600 ▲3.39%
- 2014–2015: 901,803 ▼0.52%
- 2015–2016: 984,356 ▲9.15%
- 2016–2017: 982,039 ▼0.23%
- 2017–2018: 977,673 ▼0.44%
- 2018–2019: 998,400 ▲2.12%
- 2019–2020: 785,800 ▼21.29%
- 2020–2021: 368,300 ▼53.13%
- 2021–2022: 442,450 ▲20.13%

Services
Preceding station	Metro Trains	Following station
Seddon towards Sandringham via Flinders Street	Werribee line	Spotswood towards Werribee or Williamstown
Seddon towards Sandringham via Flinders Street	Williamstown line	Spotswood towards Werribee or Williamstown
- Building details

General information
- Architectural style: Victorian Free Classical
- Year built: 1870–1949

Design and construction
- Architects: Richard L. Gray; P. J. Corbel

Victorian Heritage Register
- Official name: Yarraville railway station complex
- Type: Registered place
- Criteria: A, B, D
- Designated: 19 December 2024
- Reference no.: H2447
- Category: Transport - Rail
Track layout
Location

Yarraville station is a railway station operated by Metro Trains Melbourne on the Werribee and Williamstown lines, both part of the Melbourne rail network. It serves the inner-western suburb of Yarraville, in Melbourne, Victoria, Australia. Yarraville station is a ground-level host station, featuring two side platforms. The station opened on 20 November 1871 as South Footscray.

The station and associated buildings were added to the Victorian Heritage Register on 19 December 2024.

== History ==
Yarraville station opened twelve years after the line from Footscray was extended to Newport. Like the suburb, the station was named after the Yarraville real estate development, which was promoted by Biers, Henningham & Co. Land sales began in 1859.

In 1892, the present station buildings were provided, replacing timber buildings that had been destroyed by fire in 1890. The station opened to goods traffic in 1883 and, in 1893, a goods shed that had been at South Morang was relocated to Yarraville. In 1912, an extension of the yard was provided at the up end.

By July 1969, the station had been closed to goods traffic, with the goods shed demolished shortly after. In 1970, an overpass replaced a level crossing at nearby Somerville Road and, in 1991, the goods yard was removed.

Interlocked crossing gates, controlled from a signal box at the down end of Platform 1, protected the Anderson Street level crossing until 1995, when the gates were fixed in the open position and replaced by boom barriers, leading to the closure of the signal box the next year. In 1997, a pedestrian subway under the line in Anderson Street was filled in and replaced by pedestrian gates. In October 2022, the Level Crossing Removal Project announced that the Anderson Street level crossing would be closed to vehicular traffic by 2030, and would be replaced by a pedestrian subway.

=== Heritage listing ===
The interlocking gates (1890) were added to the Victorian Heritage Register on 29 September 1994. In December 2024, the heritage curtail was expanded to also include the former weatherboard residence (1887-88) for the stationmaster, upside brick station building (1892), male toilet block (1892-93), former goods siding (1893-94), downside shelter (c. 1910s), booking hall (1922), brick signal box (1927), shops (c. 1935 – c. 1936), and the Anderson Street bus interchange (1949). The stationmaster's residence was sold in 1996 and used as a private residence. The southern section of the property was excised in 1998 and became the site of a separate housing development.

== Platforms and services ==
Yarraville has two side platform and is served by Werribee and Williamstown trains.

Yarraville platform arrangement
Platform	Line	Destination	Via	Service Type	Notes	Source
1	Williamstown line Werribee line	Flinders Street or Sandringham	Flinders Street	All stations		
2	Werribee line	Laverton or Werribee		All stations	Laverton services operate on weekdays.	
2	Williamstown line	Williamstown		All stations		

== Transport links ==
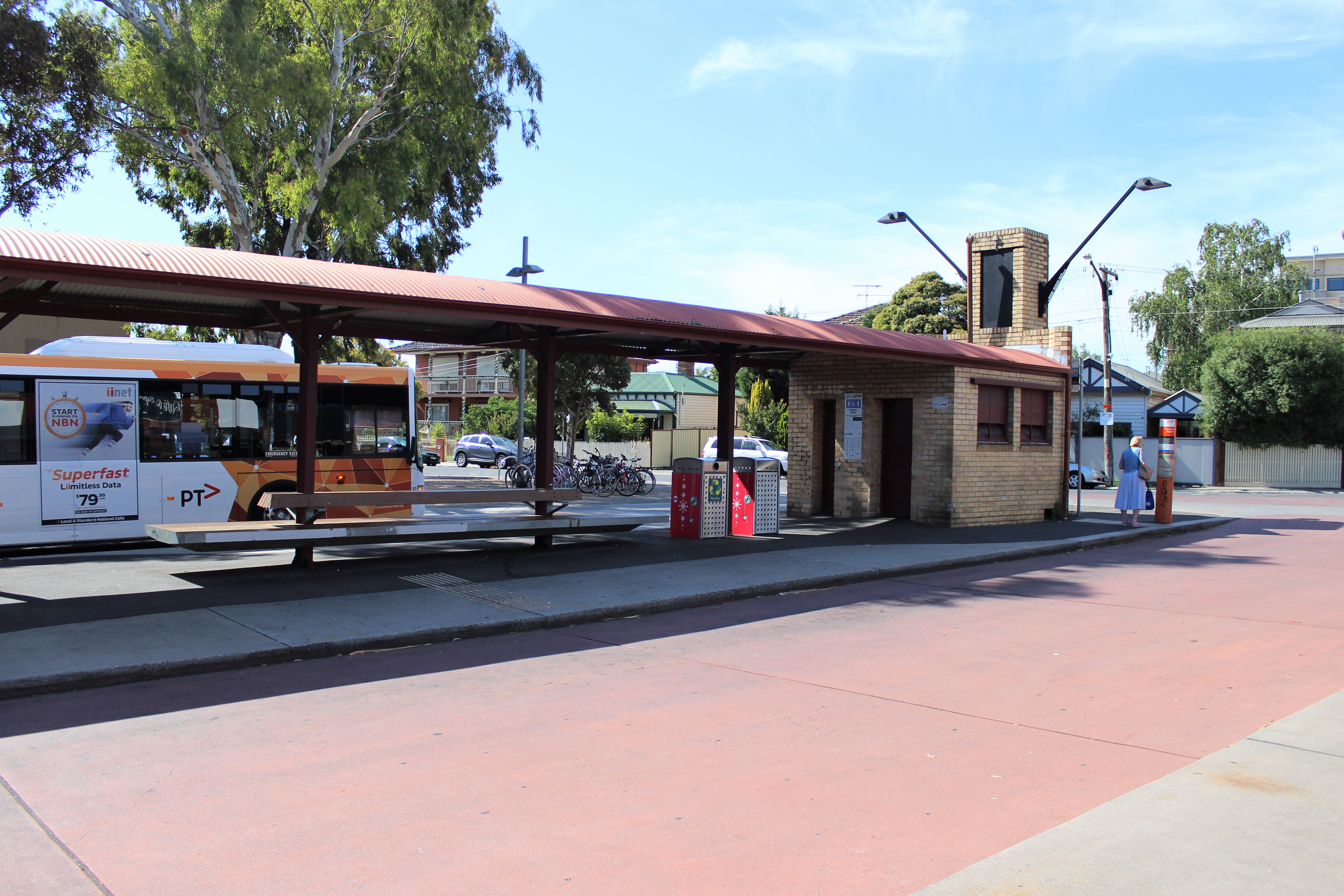
Bus interchange to the station's west, 2017

CDC Melbourne operates one bus route to and from Yarraville station, under contract to Public Transport Victoria:

- 409 : to Highpoint Shopping Centre

Transit Systems Victoria operates two bus routes to and from Yarraville station, under contract to Public Transport Victoria:

- 431 : to Kingsville
- 432 : to Newport station

== See also ==
- List of railway stations in Melbourne
- List of places on the Victorian Heritage Register in the City of Maribyrnong
