= Seddon railway station =

Railway station in Melbourne, Australia

Seddon
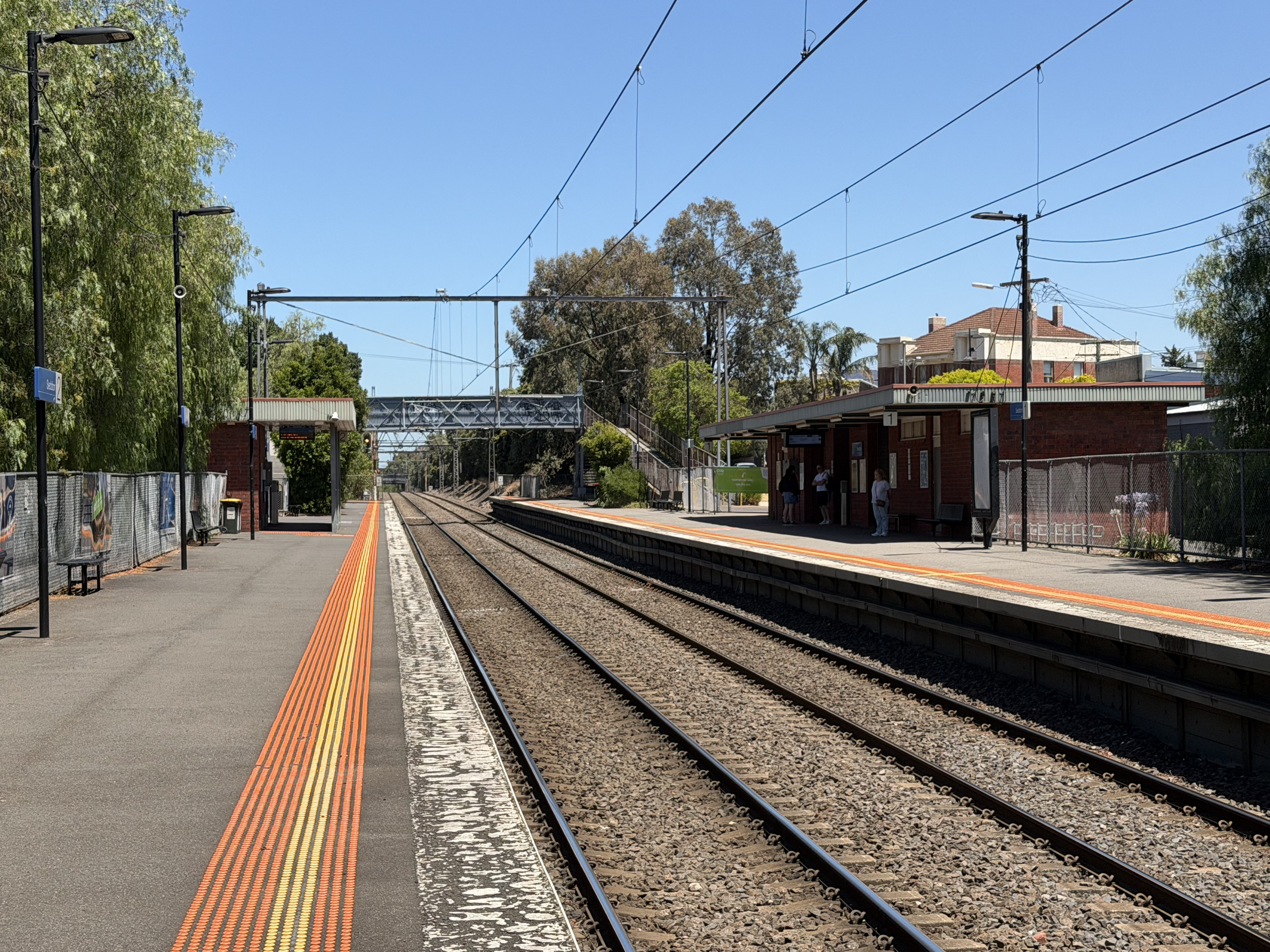
- South-west bound view from Platform 2, January 2026

General information
- Location: Pentland Parade, Seddon, Victoria 3011; City of Maribyrnong; Australia
- Coordinates: 37°48′32″S 144°53′44″E
- System: PTV commuter rail station
- Owner: VicTrack
- Operator: Metro Trains
- Lines: Werribee; Williamstown
- Distance: 6.62 kilometres from Southern Cross
- Platforms: 2 side
- Tracks: 2

Construction
- Structure type: Ground
- Parking: Yes
- Cycle facilities: Yes
- Accessible: No—steep ramp

Other information
- Status: Operational, unstaffed
- Station code: SEN
- Fare zone: Myki zone 1
- Website: Public Transport Victoria

History
- Opened: 10 December 1906; 119 years ago
- Rebuilt: 1981
- Electrified: August 1920 (1500 V DC overhead)

Passengers
- 2005–2006: 248,472
- 2006–2007: 281,275 ▲13.2%
- 2007–2008: 321,447 ▲14.28%
- 2008–2009: 370,522 ▲15.26%
- 2009–2010: 384,316 ▲3.72%
- 2010–2011: 380,225 ▼1.06%
- 2011–2012: 382,222 ▲0.52%
- 2012–2013: Not measured
- 2013–2014: 464,524 ▲21.53%
- 2014–2015: 435,188 ▼6.31%
- 2015–2016: 472,326 ▲8.53%
- 2016–2017: 475,949 ▲0.76%
- 2017–2018: 461,028 ▼3.13%
- 2018–2019: 467,700 ▲1.44%
- 2019–2020: 379,400 ▼18.88%
- 2020–2021: 168,900 ▼55.48%
- 2021–2022: 203,150 ▲20.27%

Services
| Preceding station | Metro Trains | Following station |
|---|---|---|
| Footscray towards Sandringham via Flinders Street | Werribee line | Yarraville towards Werribee or Williamstown |
| Footscray towards Sandringham via Flinders Street | Williamstown line | Yarraville towards Werribee or Williamstown |
Track layout
Location

Seddon station is a railway station operated by Metro Trains Melbourne on the Werribee and Williamstown lines, both part of the Melbourne rail network. It serves the western suburb of the same name, in Melbourne, Victoria, Australia. The station opened on 10 December 1906, and the current station buildings date from 1981.

== History ==
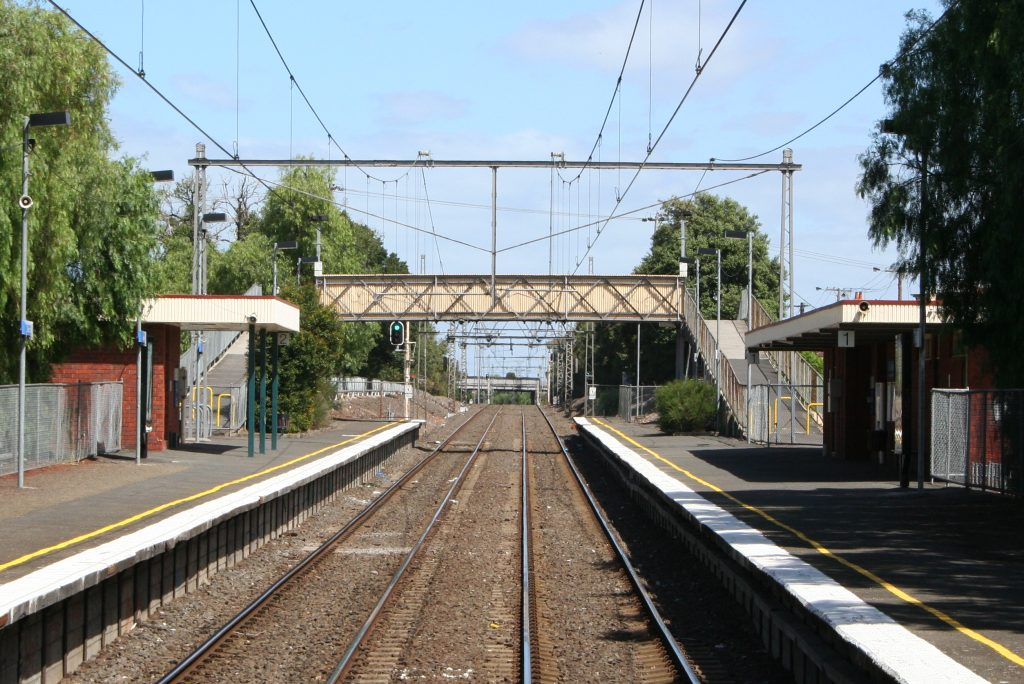
South-west view of platforms, station buildings and pedestrian bridge, March 2007

Seddon station, like the suburb itself, was named after Richard John Seddon, who had worked at the Newport railway workshops, was a corporal in the artillery at Williamstown, and was Prime Minister of New Zealand between 1893 and 1906.

The station opened as a double line block post with a signal box for the control of trains, in the section from Footscray to Yarraville. The block post closed in 1912, but automatic signalling was not provided on the section until 1927.

In 1972, both platforms were extended. In 1980, the former timber buildings were demolished, and were replaced with the current station buildings.

== Platforms and services ==
Seddon has two side platforms and is served by Werribee and Williamstown line trains.

Seddon platform arrangement
| Platform | Line | Destination | Via | Service Type | Notes | Source |
|---|---|---|---|---|---|---|
| 1 | Williamstown line Werribee line | Flinders Street or Sandringham | Flinders Street | All stations | | |
| 2 | Werribee line | Laverton or Werribee | | All stations | Laverton services operate on weekdays. | |
| 2 | Williamstown line | Williamstown | | All stations | | |
