= Williamstown Pier railway station =

Former railway station in Victoria, Australia

Williamstown Pier
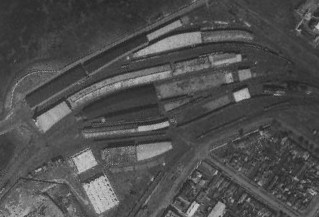
- View of the station and goods yard in May 1942

General information
- Other names: Pier (1859–1880)
- Coordinates: 37°51′57″S 144°54′38″E
- System: Closed commuter rail station
- Line: Williamstown
- Distance: 14.7 kilometres from Southern Cross
- Platforms: 1
- Tracks: 1

Other information
- Status: Demolished
- Station code: WPR

History
- Opened: 17 January 1859; 167 years ago
- Closed: 25 March 1987; 39 years ago

Former services
Preceding station	MetRail	Following station
Williamstown towards Flinders Street	Williamstown line	Terminus
List of closed railway stations in Melbourne
Track layout
Location

Williamstown Pier was a railway station that served as the original terminus of the Williamstown line on the Melbourne rail network. It was located in the suburb of Williamstown and existed primarily to serve the Williamstown docks precinct.

== History ==
The station was opened on 17 January 1859. It was originally named Pier, but the name was changed to Williamstown Pier by 1880. The station contained a goods yard that was used for grain shipments up until the 1960s.

Williamstown Pier station was opened to passengers on 15 May 1881. The original goods sheds were destroyed by fire on 24 January 1900. The station relocated to a new site on 8 January 1905.

Not all Williamstown line trains served Williamstown Pier, with several running during peak hour to serve dock workers on weekdays, while some trains also ran on weekends for people taking day trips to the area.

By mid-1978, the station building was demolished and was replaced with two smaller brick structures. The last services terminated at the station on 25 March 1987, following a derailment on the sharply curved track leading to the station. All rails, sleepers, overhead wires and signals were removed by October 1988, with the platform track and overhead currently ending just under the Ann Street footbridge, at the down end of Williamstown station. The station was subsequently demolished and replaced with a car park and parkland.

The station building was demolished around the early 1990s. A short section of disused tracks beyond Williamstown station was the only remains of the line towards Williamstown Pier, until it was removed in 2021 around the time of the Ferguson Street level crossing removal.
