= Williamstown line =

Passenger rail service in metropolitan Melbourne, Victoria, Australia

Williamstown

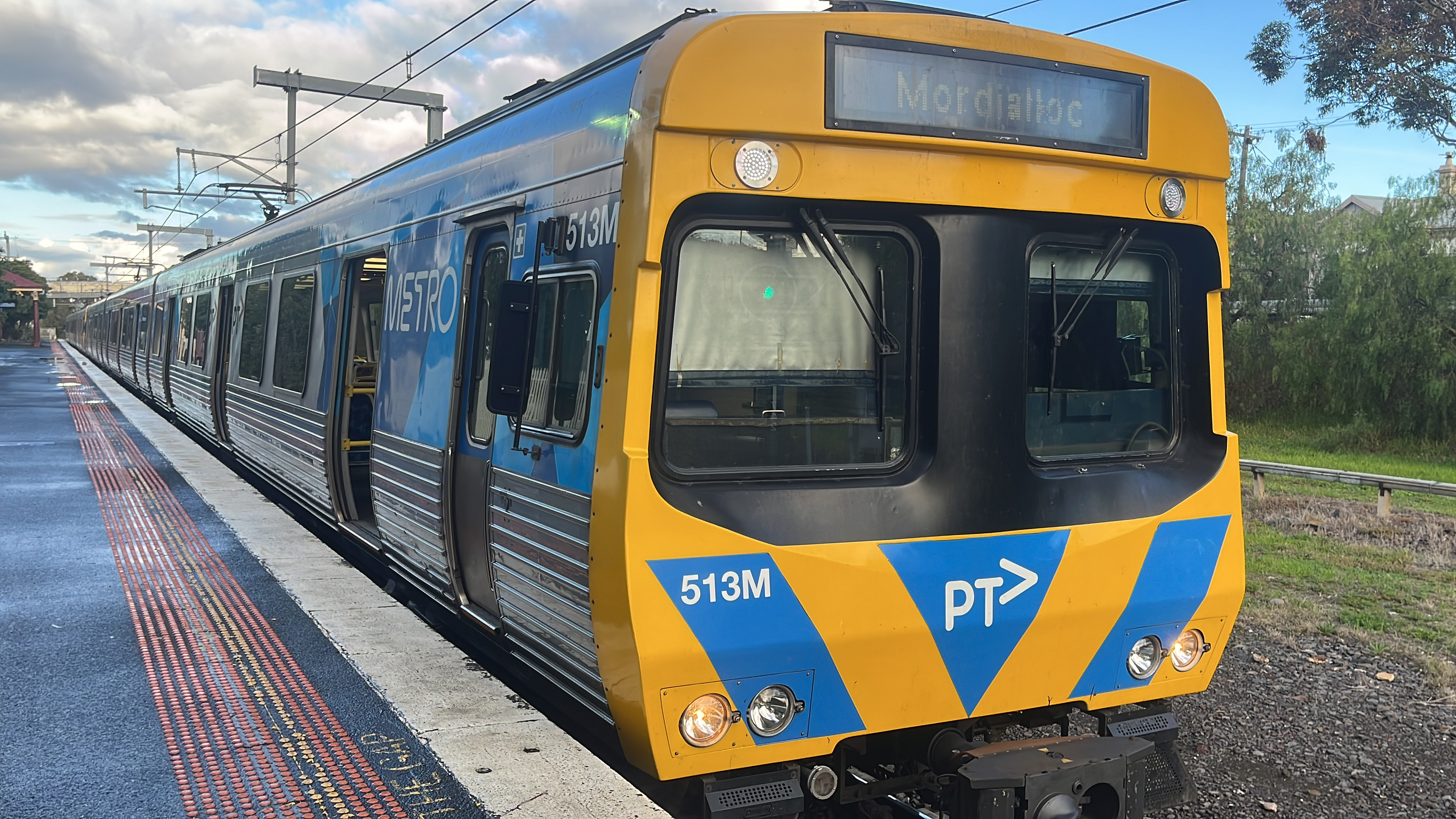
- A Comeng Train at Williamstown Station, July 2025

Overview
- Service type: Commuter rail
- System: Melbourne railway network
- Status: Operational
- Locale: Melbourne, Victoria, Australia
- First service: 17 January 1859; 167 years ago
- Current operator: Metro Trains
- Former operators: Geelong and Melbourne Railway (G&MR) (1857–1859); Victorian Railways (VR) (1859–1974); VR as VicRail (1974–1983); MTA (The Met) (1983–1989); PTC (The Met) (1989–1998); Bayside Trains (1998–2000); M>Train (2000–2004); Connex Melbourne (2004–2009)

Route
- Termini: Flinders Street (some continue to Sandringham); Williamstown
- Stops: 12
- Distance travelled: 16.2 km (10.1 mi)
- Average journey time: 27 minutes
- Service frequency: 20 minutes most times; 60 minutes early weekend mornings; 10 minute frequency daytime between Flinders Street and Newport in combination with Werribee line; Most weekday trains continue to or start from Sandringham along the Sandringham line; Weekend afternoon trains start or terminate at Flinders Street; Shuttle-only operation between Newport and Williamstown at nighttime, weekend mornings and night network
- Line used: Williamstown

Technical
- Rolling stock: Comeng, Siemens, X'Trapolis 100
- Track gauge: 1,600 mm (5 ft 3 in)
- Electrification: 1500 V DC overhead
- Track owner: VicTrack

The Williamstown line is a commuter railway line in the city of Melbourne, Victoria, Australia. Operated by Metro Trains Melbourne, it is the city's third shortest metropolitan railway line at 16.2 kilometres (10.1 mi).

The line runs from Flinders Street station in central Melbourne to Williamstown station in the inner west, serving 12 stations via Footscray, Yarraville, and Newport. The line operates for approximately 19 hours a day (from approximately 5:00 am to around 12:00 am) with 24-hour service available on Friday and Saturday nights. For most of the day, the line operates with headways of 20 minutes, ensuring frequent service for commuters. Trains on the Williamstown Line run with two three-car formations of Comeng and Siemens Nexas trainsets.

Together with the Southern Cross to Sunbury portion of the Deniliquin railway line, it is the first and oldest government-built line in Victoria, having opened on 13 January 1859. The line was built to serve the port at Williamstown, giving it economic importance to the then-colony as it established itself as an important international passenger port. The line has played an important part in the development of Victoria's railways, with the first workshops opening along the line in the 1800s.

Since the 2010s, due to the heavily utilised infrastructure of the Williamstown line, improvements and upgrades have been made. Works have included replacing sleepers, upgrading signalling technology, the removal of level crossings, the introduction of new rolling stock, and station accessibility upgrades.

Until February 2026, weekday services on the Williamstown line were through routed with the Frankston line and the line was coloured green. On 1 February 2026, Frankston line trains returned to the City Loop. As a result, the weekday services terminated at Flinders Street Station as a temporary arrangement, with no services continuing beyond Flinders Street. The colour of the line was also changed to pink, the same colour as the Sandringham line. Since 23 August 2026, the weekday Williamstown line services are through routed with the Sandringham line.

== History ==
=== 19th century ===
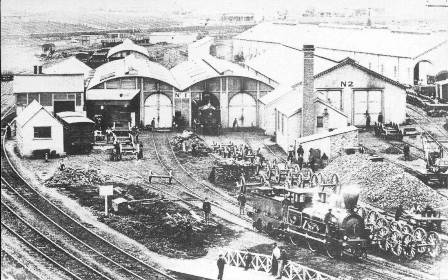
The original Williamstown Workshops in 1870.

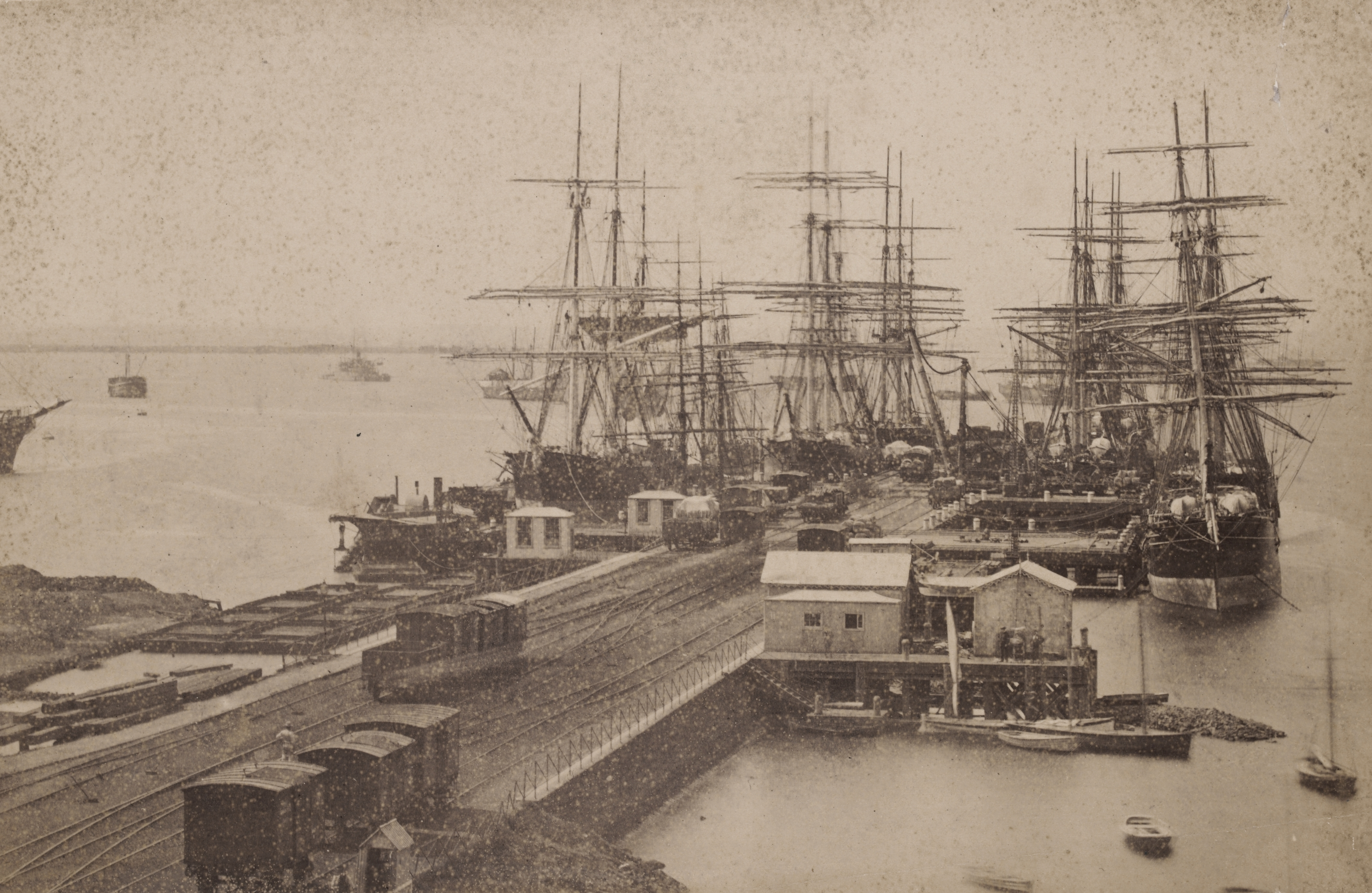
Railway (Nelson) Pier in Williamstown, 1883

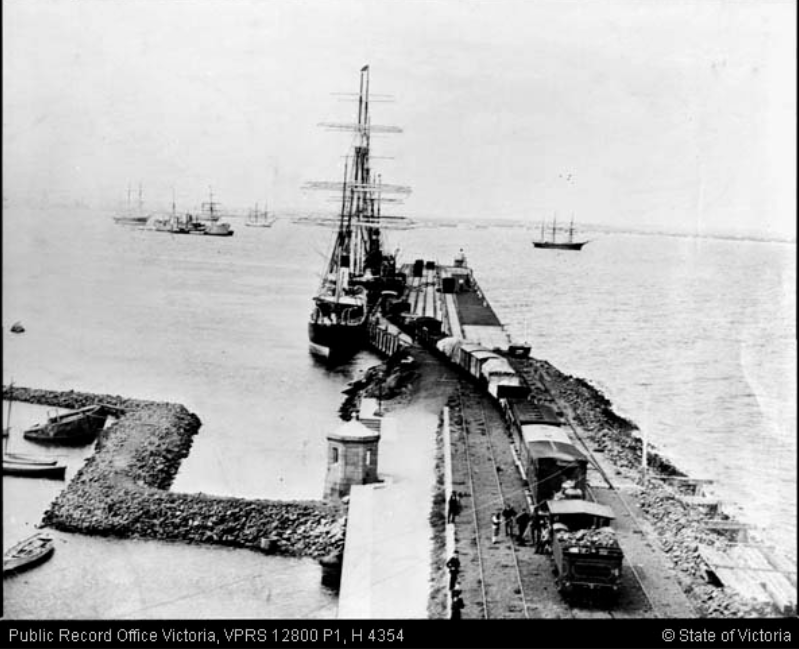
Breakwater Pier, Williamstown was one of three piers connected directly to the railway line, 1890.

Construction of the line was started by the Melbourne, Mount Alexander, and Murray River Railway Company (MMA&MRR) with the construction of Batman Hill (now Southern Cross) station in 1853. Interestingly, the station did not see a train for another 6 years till services began in 1857. In response to 12 months of inaction by the MMA&MRR and pressure from the government and financial backers, the company organised a gala event at Williamstown on 12 June 1854.

Recognising the challenges faced by private companies and the pressing need for railway development, the government took action to address the situation. On 19 March 1856, despite only small sections being completed, the government intervened and acquired the line, assuming responsibility for its construction and further development.

In 1858, the Williamstown Workshops opened for the assembly of engines and carriages imported from England. Other buildings were soon added, with a total of seven locomotives built. During the late 1880s when railway management described the workshops as inadequate, moves were made to construct new workshops at Newport. By 1889 the new shops were open and Williamstown was closed.

Although it is now operated as a branch from the main Werribee/Geelong line at Newport, the line was originally built from the city with the Geelong line being the branch. The line officially opened in January 1859, but the section between the Newport Workshops and Williamstown Pier was in use by Geelong-line trains from October 1857 as it provided a connection to the ferry services departing from the pier. From Williamstown Pier, passengers could connect to a ferry across Hobsons Bay to Port Melbourne.

=== 20th century ===
In August 1920, the line was fully electrified from North Melbourne to the Williamstown Pier. Later in 1927, the section from South Kensington to Footscray received three-position signalling with further extensions of the three position signalling occurring in 1929 and 1997.

Due to the proximity to the nearby wharf facilities, the Williamstown line provided a vital connection between Melbourne and the freight and passenger facilities at the port provided. The railway was built to serve the Government port at Williamstown, giving it great economic importance to the Colony of Victoria and establishing its role as an international passenger port.

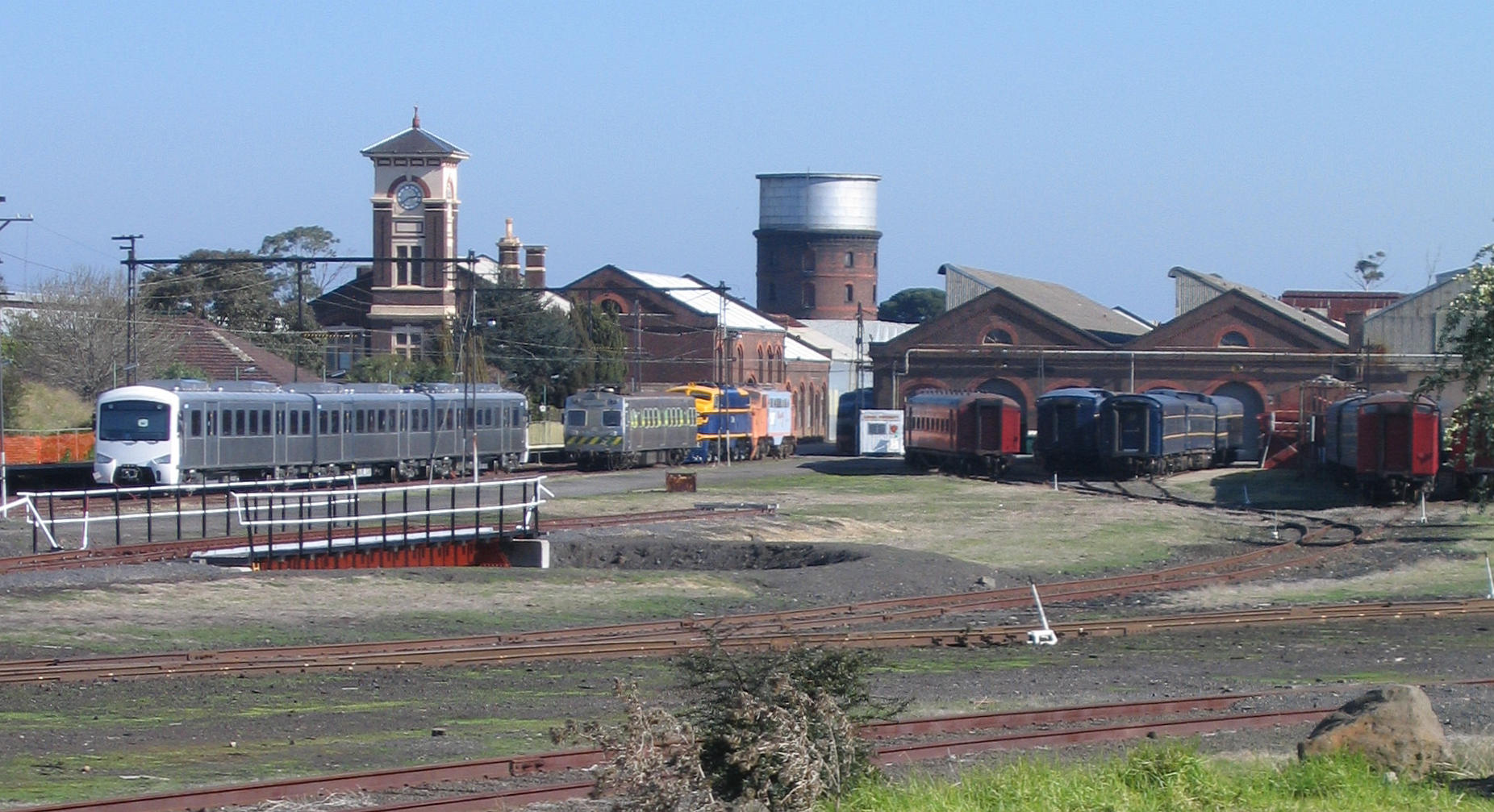
The Newport Workshops pictured in August 2005

The Newport Workshops in Victoria have played a significant role in the railway system, highlighting their importance through various expansion initiatives. Notable expansions took place from 1905 to 1915 and again from 1925 to 1930. At the peak of operation it was one of Victoria's largest and best-equipped engineering establishments, with up to 5,000 employees on site. The workshops had their own cricket grounds, and the game of Trugo is said to have been invented by workers on their lunch hour in the 1920s. In the late 1980s, the original segments of the workshops were removed from everyday use with modern workshops built along the eastern side of the site, which remains in use today.

The only section of the line to have closed was the Williamstown to Williamstown Pier section which closed in March 1987.

=== 21st century ===
In January 2021, a major timetable rewrite resulted in increased frequencies and weekend daytime shuttle services being extended from Newport to Flinders Street. Peak hour weekday services now stop at South Kensington, which simplifies stopping patterns on the Werribee and Sunbury lines.

When the Metro Tunnel was under construction, there was a plan by the state government to reorganise the Melbourne rail network. The plan included the return of the Frankston line to the City Loop, with dedicated use of the Caulfield group tunnel track. This would mean Frankston line trains would no longer through-run with Werribee and Williamstown line trains, and would again stop at City Loop stations Flagstaff, Melbourne Central and Parliament. As part of the reconfiguration, the Werribee and Williamstown lines would instead begin through-running services to Sandringham for the first time. The Metro Tunnel eventually fully opened in February 2026, and through-running services between the Williamstown and Sandringham lines began on 23 August 2026.

== Future ==
=== Level crossing removals ===
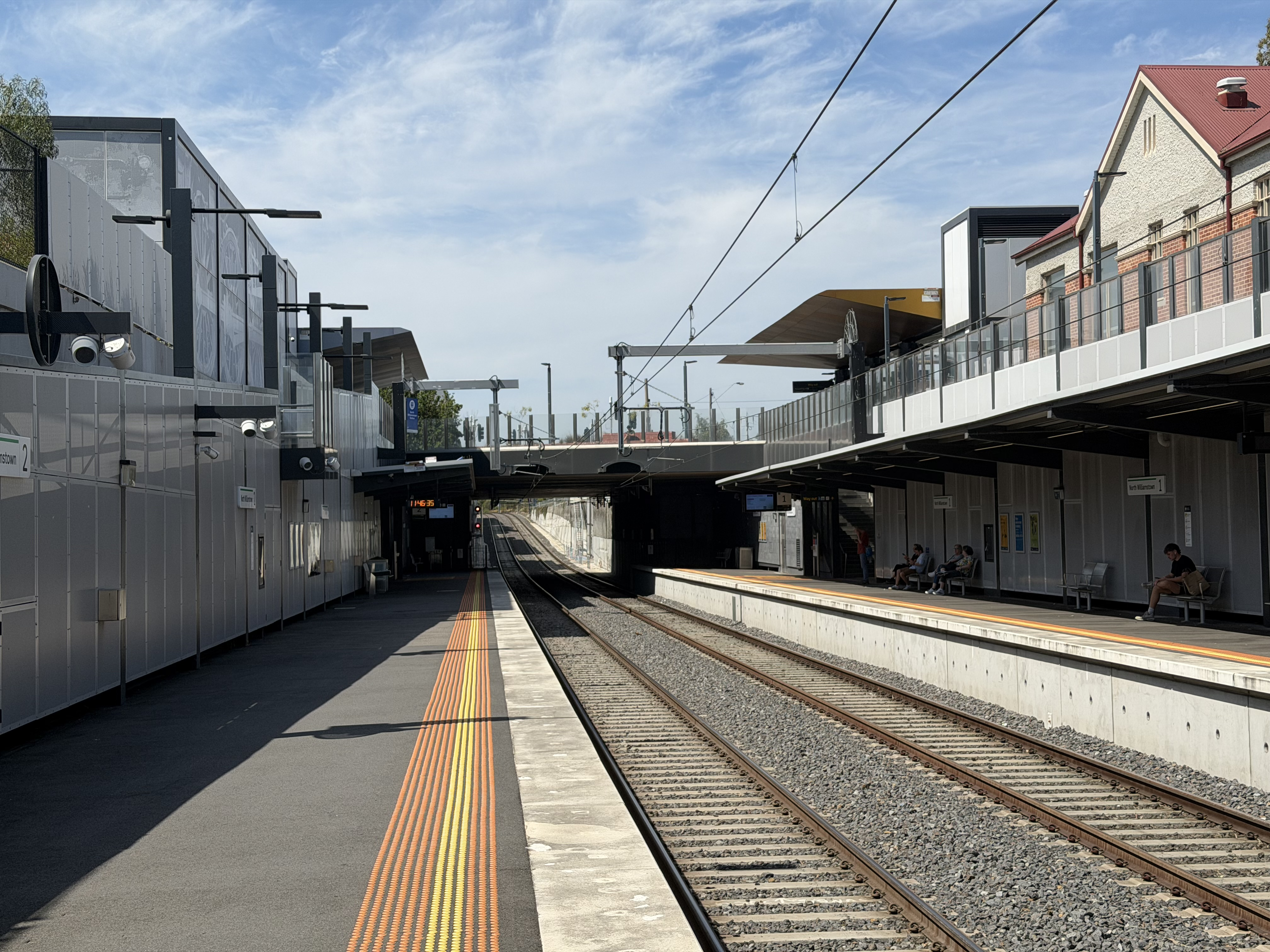
North Williamstown station was rebuilt as part of nearby level crossing removal works.

The Level Crossing Removal Project has announced the removal of 3 level crossings on the Williamstown line, to be completed in stages from 2021 to 2030. In 2021, one level crossing was removed at Ferguson Street in Williamstown. The crossing was removed by lowering the rail line onto a rail trench under the road, with the adjacent North Williamstown station also being lowered. A final two crossings will be removed along the line by 2030. The crossing at Hudsons Road in Spotswood will be removed by elevating the rail line above the road with Spotswood station also being rebuilt as part of the project. The crossing at Anderson Street, Yarraville, will be closed off as part of other level crossing removal works. At the end of these works, the Williamstown line will have 1 remaining crossing at Giffard St in Williamstown that is not scheduled for removal.

== Network and operations ==
=== Services ===
Services on the Williamstown line operate from approximately 5:00 am to around 12:00 am daily. In general, during peak hours, train frequency is 10 minutes while services during non-peak hours drop to 20 minutes throughout the entire route. In combination with the Werribee line, frequencies are boosted between Newport and Flinders Street.

Services on the line do not run through the City Loop. Instead, most daytime services on weekdays continue onto the Sandringham line, while daytime services on weekends (between midday and evening) and occasional weekday peak hour services terminate at Flinders Street. At other periods with low patronage, shuttle services operate between Newport and Williamstown operate at nighttime (daily), weekend mornings, and as part of the Night Network. Night Network operates on Friday and Saturday late nights, with services running 24 hours a day with 60-minute frequencies available outside of normal operating hours.

Train services on the Williamstown line are also subjected to maintenance and renewal works, usually on selected Fridays and Saturdays. Shuttle bus services are provided throughout the duration of works for affected commuters.

==== Stopping patterns ====
Legend — Station status

- ◼ Premium Station – Station staffed from first to last train
- ◻ Host Station – Usually staffed during morning peak, however this can vary for different stations on the network.

Legend — Stopping patterns
Services do not operate via the City Loop

- ● – All trains stop
- ◐ – Some services do not stop
- | – Trains pass and do not stop

==== Guide ====
===== Weekdays =====
- Services to Williamstown stop at all stations, continuing to Sandringham

- Services run as a shuttle between Newport and Williamstown (After 8pm)

===== Weekends =====
- Services to Williamstown stop at all stations

- Services run as a shuttle between Newport and Williamstown (Before 11am and after 7pm)

===== Night Network =====
- Services run as a shuttle between Newport and Williamstown

Williamstown Services
Station	Zone	Local	Shuttle
◼ Flinders Street	1	●	
◼ Southern Cross	1	●	
◼ North Melbourne	1	●	
South Kensington	1	●	
◼ Footscray	1	●	
Seddon	1	●	
◻ Yarraville	1	●	
Spotswood	1	●	
◼ Newport	1	●	●
North Williamstown	1	●	●
Williamstown Beach	1	●	●
◼ Williamstown	1	●	●

=== Operators ===
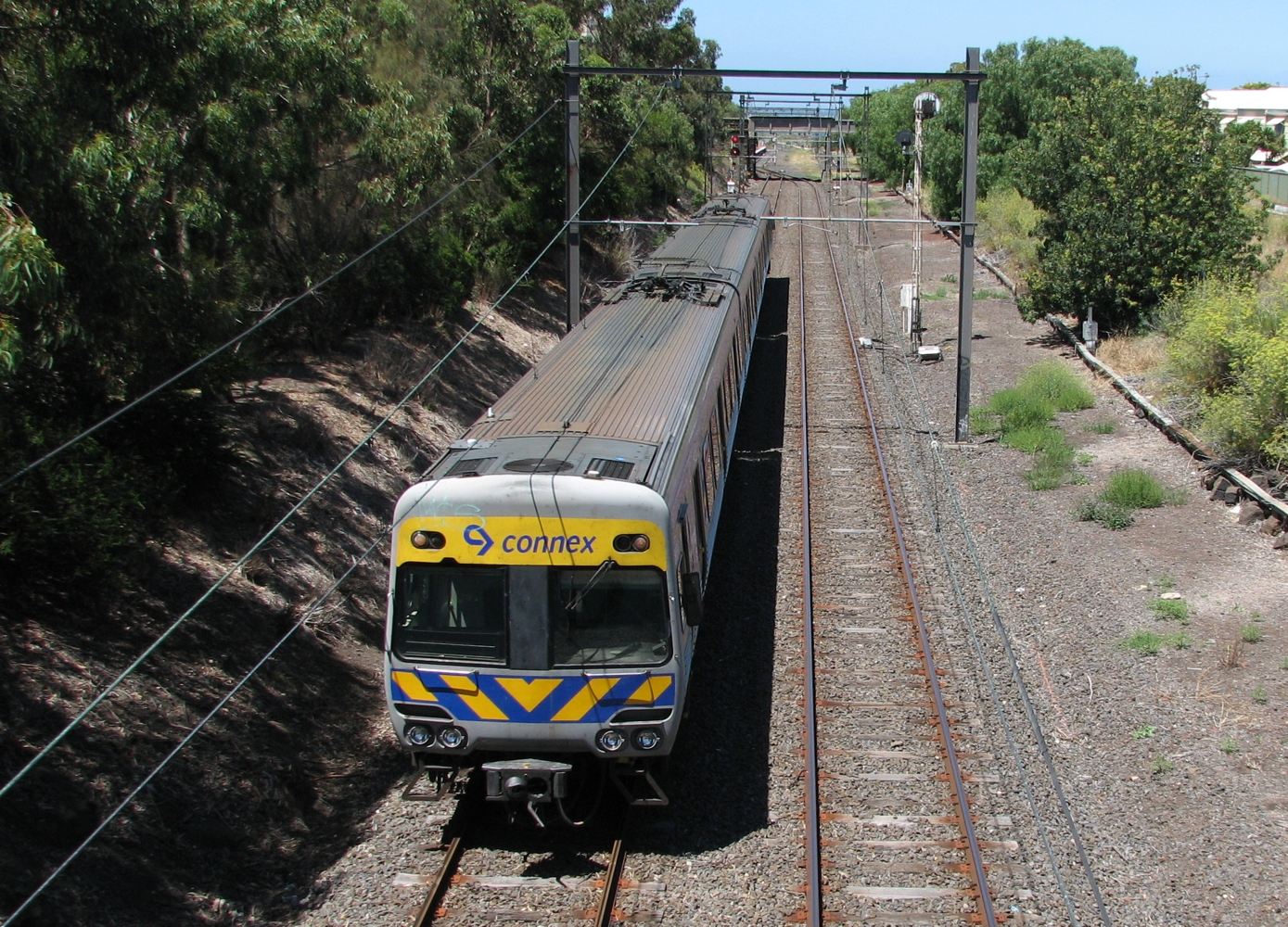
Connex Melbourne previously operated the line from 2004 until Metro Trains Melbourne commenced operations in 2009.

The Williamstown line has had a total of 8 operators since its opening in 1859. The first section of the line from near Newport to Williamstown Pier was originally opened by the government in 1857 and used by the Geelong and Melbourne Railway Company (G&MR) until the remainder of the government line to Spencer Street (now Southern Cross) opened 2 years later in 1859. This was operated by the government under the newly formed Victorian Railways (VR) using the full length from Williamstown Pier to Spencer Street (G&MR then used the VR line from Newport to Spencer Street). Many operators throughout its history have been government run. From its government acquisition in 1856 until the 1999 privatisation of Melbourne's rail network, four different government operators have run the line. These operators, Victorian Railways, the Metropolitan Transit Authority, the Public Transport Corporation, and Bayside Trains have a combined operational length of 141 years.

Bayside Trains was privatised in August 1999 and later rebranded M>Train. In 2002, M>Train was placed into receivership and the state government regained ownership of the line, with KPMG appointed as receivers to operate M>Train on behalf of the state government. Two years later, rival train operator Connex Melbourne took over the M>Train operations including the Williamstown line. Metro Trains Melbourne, the current private operator, then took over the operations in 2009. The private operators have had a combined operational period of 28 years.

Past and present operators of the Williamstown line:
Operator	Assumed operations	Ceased operations	Length of operations
Geelong and Melbourne Railway (G&MR)	1857	1859	2 years
Victorian Railways	1859	1983	124 years
Metropolitan Transit Authority	1983	1989	6 years
Public Transport Corporation	1989	1998	9 years
Bayside Trains (government operator)	1998	2000	2 years
M>Train	2000	2004	4 years
Connex Melbourne	2004	2009	5 years
Metro Trains Melbourne	2009	incumbent	16 years (ongoing)

=== Route ===
Interactive map of the Williamstown line in western Melbourne, also showing the Werribee line.

Williamstown (physical track)

Overview
- Status: Operational with passenger services from Flinders Street to Williamstown
- Owner: Melbourne, Mount Alexander and Murray River Railway Company (MMA&MRR) (1853–1856); Department of Railways (1856–1859); Victorian Railways (VR) (1859–1974); VR as VicRail (1974–1983); MTA (The Met) (1983–1989); PTC (The Met) (1989–1997); VicTrack (1997–Current)
- Locale: Melbourne, Victoria, Australia
- Termini: Flinders Street; Williamstown
- Connecting lines: All metropolitan, regional, and interstate; Newport–Sunshine
- Former connections: Maribyrnong
- Stations: 12 current stations; 5 former stations; 3 sidings; 5 former sidings

Service
- Services: Williamstown

History
- Work began: 12 June 1854
- Opened: Newport to Williamstown Pier on 3 October 1857; Southern Cross to Newport on 17 January 1859
- Completed: 17 January 1859
- Electrified: Flinders Street to North Melbourne on 28 May 1919; North Melbourne to Williamstown Pier on 2 August 1920

Technical
- Line length: 16.2 km (10.1 mi)
- Num of tracks: Six tracks – Flinders Street to Footscray; Double track: Footscray to Williamstown
- Track gauge: 1,600 mm (5 ft 3 in)
- Electrification: 1500 V DC overhead
- Operating speed: 80 km/h (50 mph) – Electric; 50 km/h (31 mph) – Diesel
- Signalling: Automatic block signalling
- Maximum incline: 1 in 55 (1.82%)

The Williamstown line forms a mostly straight route from the Melbourne central business district to its terminus in Williamstown. The route is 16.2 kilometres (10.1 mi) long and is fully doubled tracked from Flinders Street to its terminus (excluding Williamstown station where the track narrows to one track at the single platform). After changing from Frankston services at Flinders Street, the Williamstown line traverses flat country with few curves and minimal earthworks for most of the line. Some sections of the line have been elevated or lowered to remove level crossings, including at Williamstown North station. There is only one crossing remaining on the line which is not scheduled to be removed.

The line follows the same alignment as the Werribee line with the two services splitting onto different routes at Newport. The Williamstown line continues its southern alignment, whereas the Werribee line takes a western alignment towards their final destinations. Most of the rail line goes through built-up suburbs and heavy industrial areas.

=== Stations ===
The line serves 12 stations across 16.2 kilometres (10.1 mi) of track. The stations are a mix of elevated, lowered, and ground level designs. The many elevated and lowered stations being constructed as part of level crossing removals. From 2030, Spotswood station will be elevated as part of additional level crossing removal works.

Station	Image	Accessibility	Opened	Terrain	Train connections	Other connections
Flinders Street		Yes—step free access	1854	Lowered	13 connections: * Alamein line; Belgrave line; Craigieburn line; Flemington Racecourse line; Gippsland line; Glen Waverley line; Hurstbridge line; Lilydale line; Mernda line; Sandringham line; Sunbury line; Upfield line; Werribee line	Trams Buses
Southern Cross		Yes—step free access	1859	Ground level	25 connections: * Alamein line; Albury line; Ararat line; Ballarat line; Belgrave line; Bendigo line; Craigieburn line; Echuca line; Flemington Racecourse line; Frankston line; Geelong line; Gippsland line; Glen Waverley line; Hurstbridge line; Lilydale line; Maryborough line; Mernda line; NSW TrainLink Southern; Seymour line; Shepparton line; Swan Hill line; The Overland; Upfield line; Warrnambool line; Werribee line	Trams Buses Coaches SkyBus
North Melbourne		Yes—step free access	1859	Ground level	6 connections: * Craigieburn line; Flemington Racecourse line; Seymour line; Shepparton line; Upfield line; Werribee line	Buses
South Kensington		No—steep ramp	1891	Ground level	1 connection: Werribee line	
Footscray		Yes—step free access	1859	Ground level	10 connections: * Ararat line; Ballarat line; Bendigo line; Echuca line; Geelong line; Maryborough line; Sunbury line; Swan Hill line; Warrnambool line; Werribee line	Trams Buses
Seddon		No—steep ramp	1906	Ground level	1 connection: Werribee line	
Yarraville		Yes—step free access	1871	Ground level	1 connection: Werribee line	Buses
Spotswood		Yes—step free access	1878	Ground level	1 connection: Werribee line	
Newport		No—steep ramp	1859	Ground level	1 connection: Werribee line	Buses
North Williamstown		Yes—step free access	1859	Below ground		Buses
Williamstown Beach		Yes—step free access	1859	Ground level		Buses
Williamstown		Yes—step free access	1859	Ground level		Buses

Station histories
Station	Opened	Closed	Age	Notes
Flinders Street	12 September 1854		172 years	Formerly Melbourne Terminus
Southern Cross	17 January 1859		167 years	Formerly Batman's Hill; Formerly Spencer Street
North Melbourne	6 October 1859		167 years	
South Kensington	11 March 1891		135 years	
Saltwater River	1 October 1859	c. 1867	Approx. 8 years	
Footscray	24 September 1900		126 years	
Footscray (Suburban)	24 January 1859	24 September 1900	41 years	
Seddon	10 December 1906		119 years	
Yarraville	20 November 1871		154 years	
Spotswood	1 February 1878		148 years	Formerly Edom; Formerly Bayswater; Formerly Spottiswoode
Newport	1 March 1859		167 years	Formerly Geelong Junction; Formerly Williamstown Junction
Greenwich	25 June 1857	28 July 1857	33 days	
Garden Platform (Newport Workshops)	?	?		
North Williamstown	1 February 1859		167 years	
Williamstown Beach	12 August 1889		137 years	Formerly Beach
Williamstown	17 January 1859		167 years	
Williamstown Pier	3 October 1857	25 March 1987	129 years	Formerly Pier
Williamstown Yard	?	?		Site of former Williamstown Workshops
Thompson's Siding	?	?		Formerly Gray Bros Siding
Nelson Pier	?	?		
Gellibrand Pier	?	1 March 1956		
Breakwater Pier	?	?		

== Infrastructure ==
=== Rolling stock ===
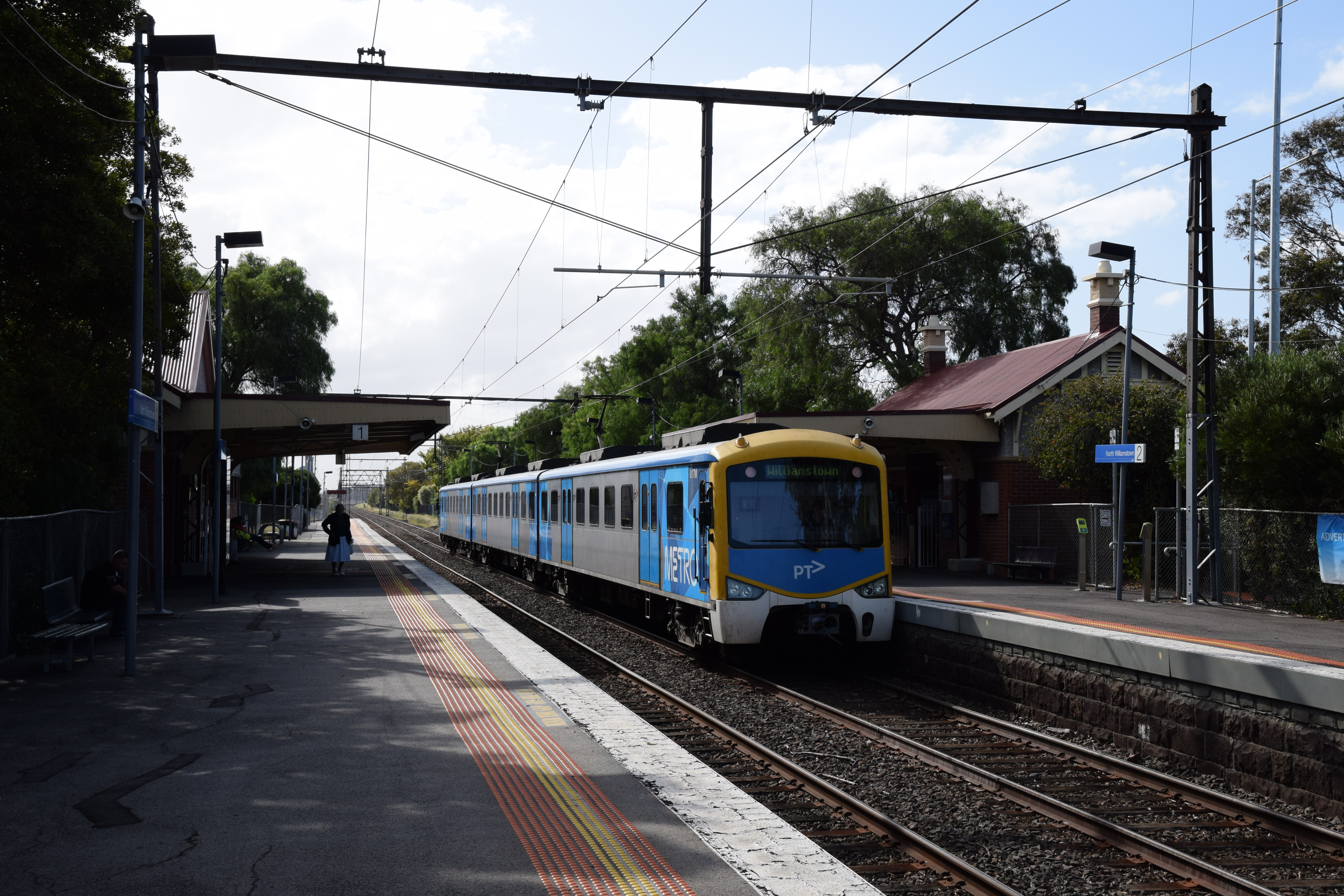
A Siemens Nexas EMU arriving at North Williamstown station.

The Williamstown line uses diverse types of electric multiple unit (EMU) trains that are operated in a split six-car configuration, with three doors per side on each carriage. The primary rolling stock featured on the line is the Comeng EMUs, built by Commonwealth Engineering between 1981 and 1988. These train sets are the oldest on the Melbourne rail network and subsequently will be replaced by the mid 2030s. Siemens Nexas EMUs are also widely featured on the line, originally built between 2002 and 2005. These train sets feature more modern technology than the Comeng trains. The X'Trapolis 100 built by Alstom between 2002 and 2004, and 2009 and 2020 were also previously used on this line prior to the formation of the new Cross City Group in August 2026. All of these rolling stock models are widely used on other lines across the metropolitan network and work as the backbone of the network.

Alongside the passenger trains, Williamstown line tracks and equipment are maintained by a fleet of engineering trains. The four types of engineering trains are: the shunting train; designed for moving trains along non-electrified corridors and for transporting other maintenance locomotives, for track evaluation; designed for evaluating track and its condition, the overhead inspection train; designed for overhead wiring inspection, and the infrastructure evaluation carriage designed for general infrastructure evaluation. Most of these trains are repurposed locomotives previously used by V/Line, Metro Trains, and the Southern Shorthaul Railroad.

=== Accessibility ===
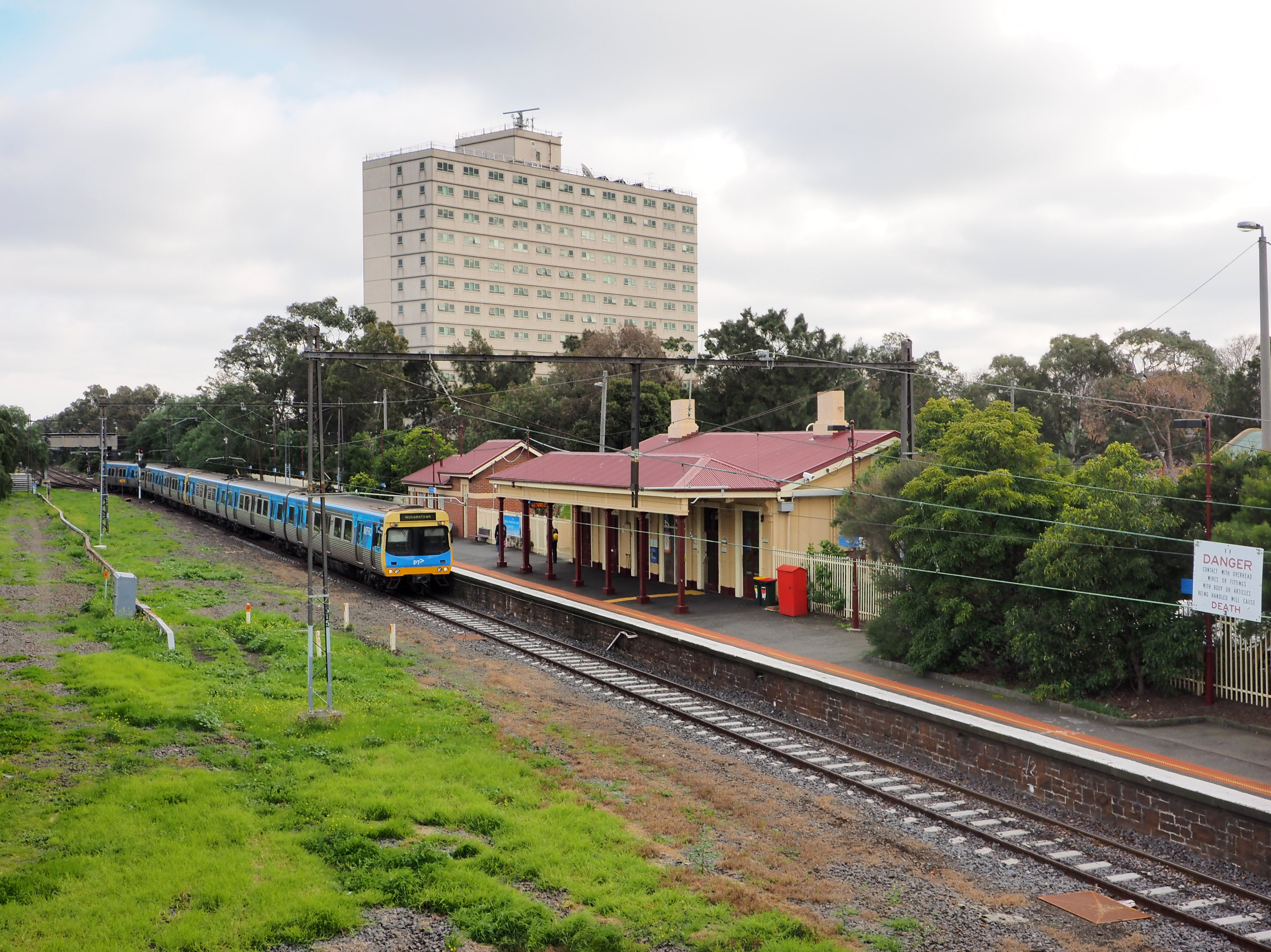
Williamstown station is fully wheelchair accessible featuring tactile boarding indicators and wheelchair accessible ramps.

In compliance with the Disability Discrimination Act of 1992, all stations that are new-built or rebuilt are fully accessible and comply with these guidelines. The majority of stations on the corridor are fully accessible, however, there are some stations that have not been upgraded to meet these guidelines. These stations do feature ramps, however, they have a gradient greater than 1 in 14. Stations that are fully accessible feature ramps that have a gradient less than 1 in 14, have at-grade paths, or feature lifts. These stations typically also feature tactile boarding indicators, independent boarding ramps, wheelchair accessible myki barriers, hearing loops, and widened paths.

Projects improving station accessibility have included the Level Crossing Removal Project, which involves station rebuilds and upgrades and other individual station upgrade projects. These works have made significant strides in improving network accessibility, with more than 75% of Williamstown line stations classed as fully accessible. This number is expected to grow within the coming years with the completion of level crossing removal works on the corridor by 2029.

=== Signalling ===
The Williamstown line uses three position signalling which is widely used across the Melbourne train network. Three position signalling was first introduced in 1927, with the last section of the line converted to the new type of signalling in 1997.
