= Spotswood railway station =

Railway station in Melbourne, Australia

Spotswood
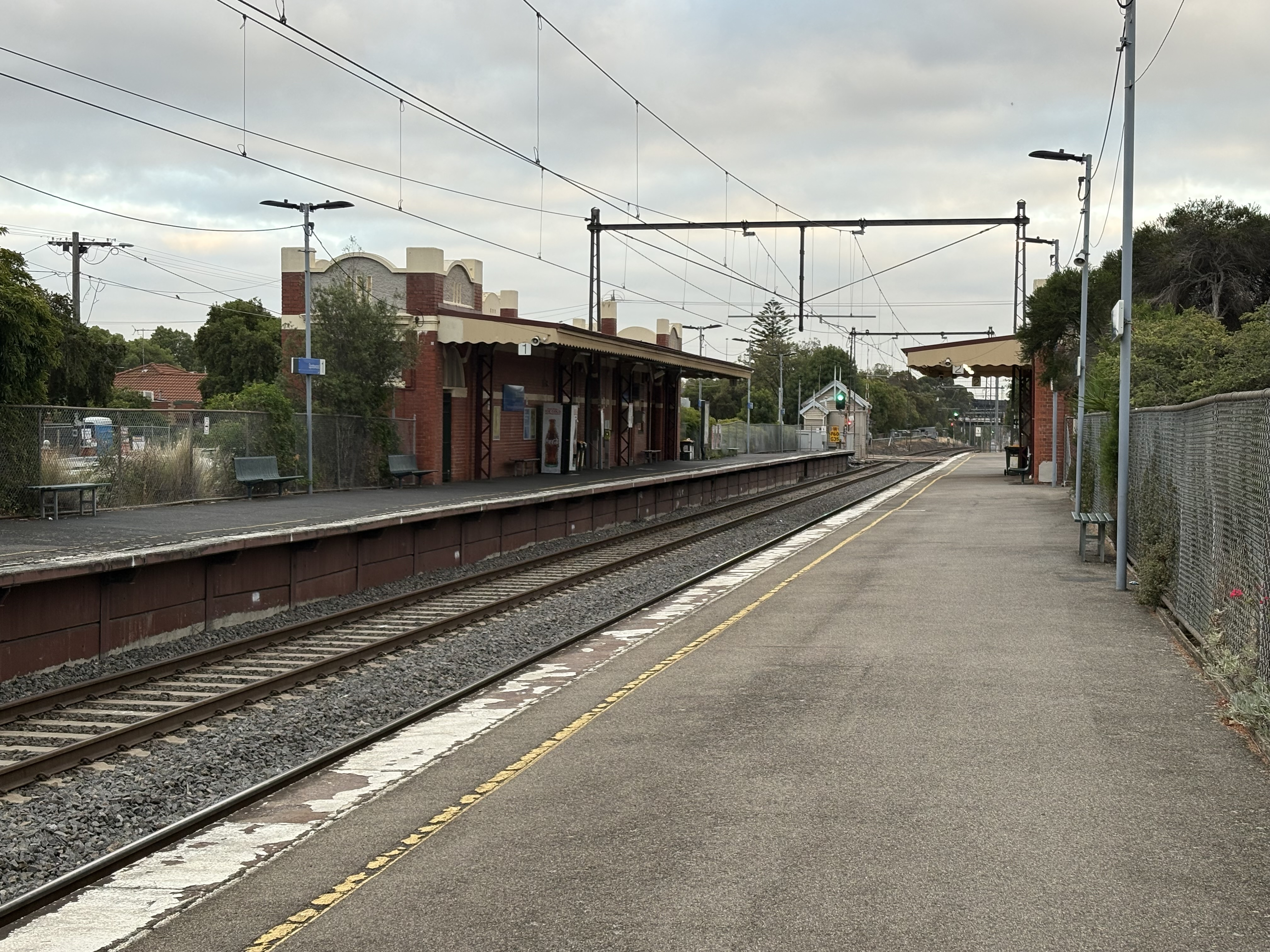
- Northbound view from platform 2, February 2026

General information
- Location: Hope Street, Spotswood, Victoria 3015; City of Hobsons Bay; Australia
- Coordinates: 37°49′50″S 144°53′09″E
- System: PTV commuter rail station
- Owner: VicTrack
- Operator: Metro Trains
- Lines: Werribee; Williamstown
- Distance: 9.22 kilometres from Southern Cross
- Platforms: 2 side
- Tracks: 2

Construction
- Structure type: Ground
- Parking: 15
- Cycle facilities: Yes
- Accessible: Yes—step free access

Other information
- Status: Operational, unstaffed
- Station code: SPT
- Fare zone: Myki zone 1
- Website: Public Transport Victoria

History
- Opened: 1 December 1878; 147 years ago
- Electrified: August 1920 (1500 V DC overhead)
- Former names: Edom (1878-1881); Bayswater (1881); Spottiswoode (1881-1905)

Passengers
- 2005–2006: 183,269
- 2006–2007: 200,275 ▲9.27%
- 2007–2008: 220,175 ▲9.93%
- 2008–2009: 255,816 ▲16.18%
- 2009–2010: 267,640 ▲4.62%
- 2010–2011: 257,659 ▼3.72%
- 2011–2012: 254,230 ▼1.33%
- 2012–2013: Not measured
- 2013–2014: 280,837 ▲10.46%
- 2014–2015: 293,792 ▲4.61%
- 2015–2016: 322,964 ▲9.87%
- 2016–2017: 318,215 ▼1.41%
- 2017–2018: 329,126 ▲3.42%
- 2018–2019: 344,850 ▲4.77%
- 2019–2020: 273,300 ▼20.74%
- 2020–2021: 122,500 ▼55.17%
- 2021–2022: 170,900 ▲39.51%

Services
Preceding station	Metro Trains	Following station
Yarraville towards Sandringham via Flinders Street	Werribee line	Newport towards Werribee or Williamstown
Yarraville towards Sandringham via Flinders Street	Williamstown line	Newport towards Werribee or Williamstown
Track layout
Location

Spotswood station is a railway station operated by Metro Trains Melbourne on the Werribee and Williamstown lines, both part of the Melbourne rail network. It serves the western suburb of Spotswood, in Melbourne, Victoria, Australia. Spotswood station is a ground-level unstaffed station, featuring two side platforms. The station opened on 1 December 1878.

Initially opened as Edom, the station has been renamed three times: to Bayswater on 1 September 1881, Spottiswoode on 1 October of that year, and Spotswood on 1 August 1905.

== History ==
As with the suburb it serves, the station was named after John Stewart Spottiswoode, who purchased land in the area in 1841.

Over the years, a number of sidings were provided for businesses in the area. In 1914, a branch line was opened at the down end of the station to the Newport Power Station, in addition to a number of other sidings serving oil terminals in the area. A siding at the up end of the station served the Australian Glass Manufacturers factory, and was used to receive sand trains from Koala Siding (near Nyora on the South Gippsland line). The last sand train operated on 15 January 1998,.

In 1972, both platforms were extended. In 1988, a number of points and dwarf signals at the station were abolished. In 1989, manually operated boom barriers replaced interlocked gates at the Hudson Road level crossing, located at the up end of the station. The new boom barriers were controlled from the signal box.

In 1994, a number of alterations occurred at the station, including the removal of a crossover at the down end, as well as the overhead wire for siding "K", the connections for siding "K" and the oil sidings, and a number of points and signals.

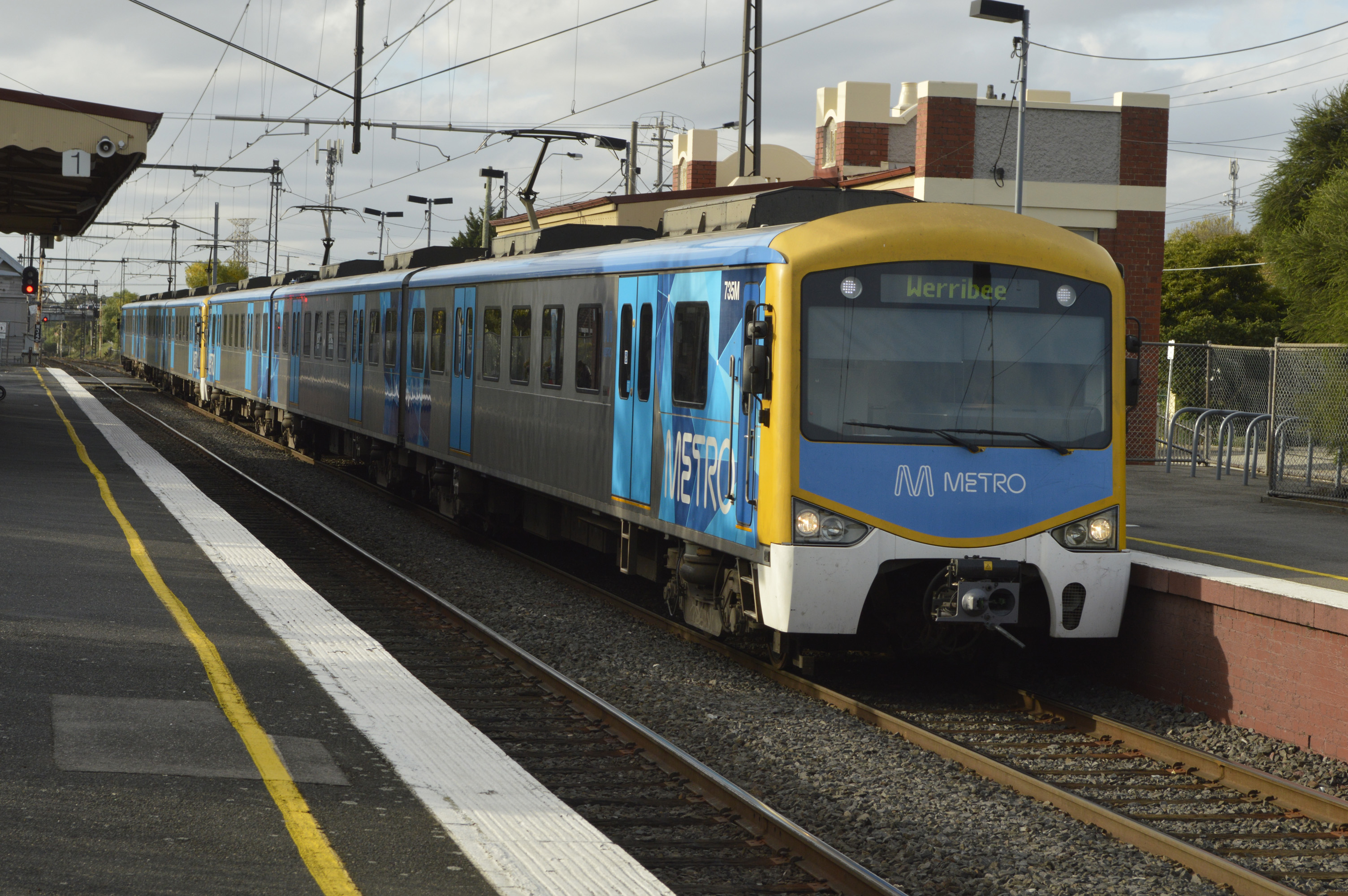
Werribee bound Siemens train arriving at Platform 2, April 2013

There is a disused signal box at the up end of Platform 1, which was decommissioned on 12 August 2001, along with the removal of the crossover at the up end, a number of dwarf signals, and a siding. The Hudson Road boom barriers were also converted to automatic operation at this time. In 2007, the remains of some sidings that ran along public roads in the area were removed by Hobsons Bay Council.

On 26 October 2022, the Level Crossing Removal Project announced that the level crossing would be grade separated by 2030, with the railway line to be rebuilt over Hudsons Road with a new station being built in an elevated island platform arrangement. The original buildings on Platform 1 are also planned to be retained and incorporated into the new station complex.

== Platforms and services ==
Spotswood has two side platforms and is served by Werribee and Williamstown line trains.

Spotswood platform arrangement
Platform	Line	Destination	Via	Service Type	Note	Source
1	Williamstown line Werribee line	Flinders Street or Sandringham	Flinders Street	All stations		
2	Werribee line	Laverton or Werribee		All stations	Laverton services operate on weekdays.	
2	Williamstown line	Williamstown		All stations		
