= X'Trapolis 100 =

Rolling stock in use on the Melbourne rail network and Valparaíso metro

X'Trapolis 100 (Melbourne)
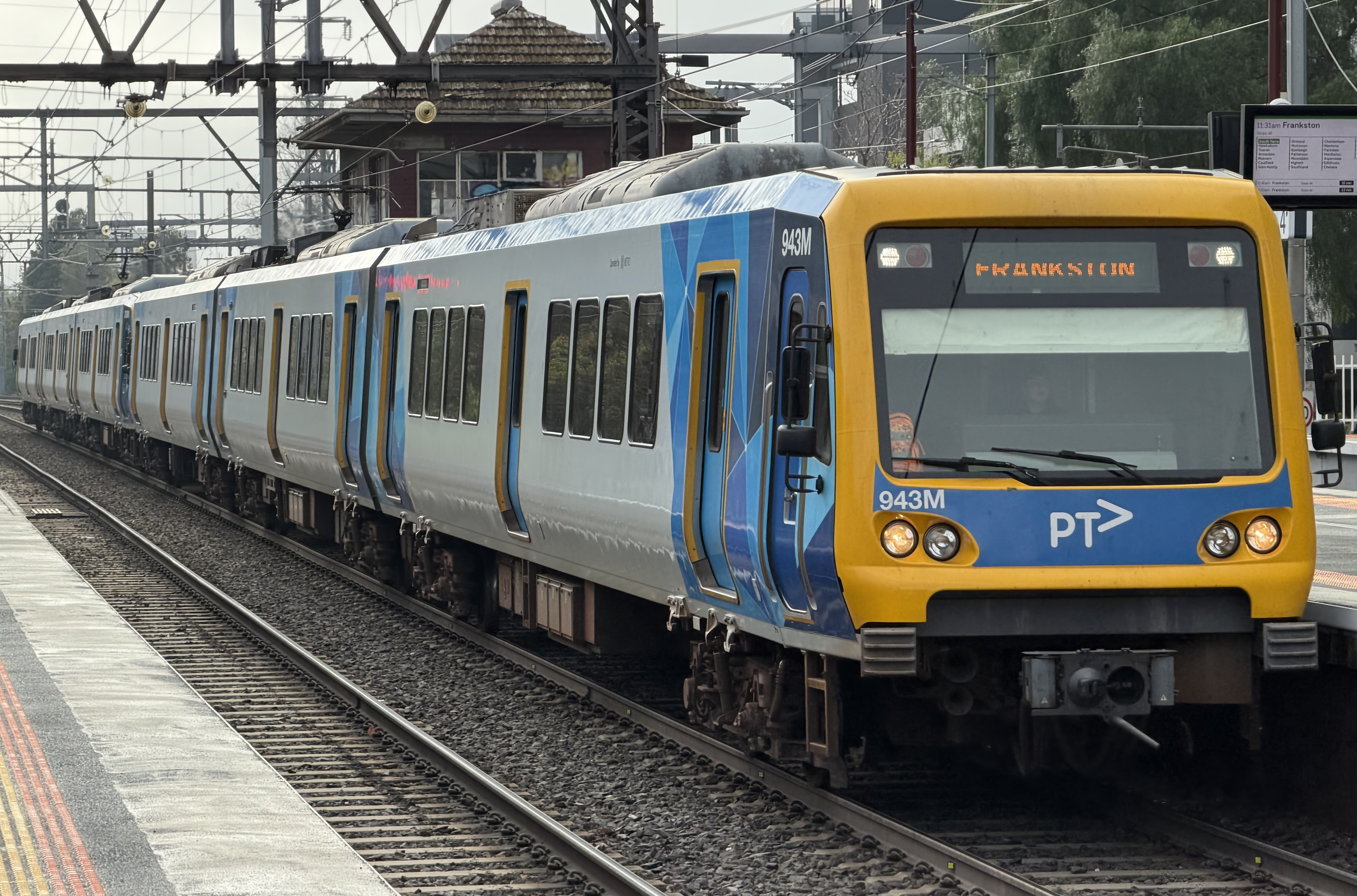
- X'Trapolis 100 set 943M at South Yarra, June 2026

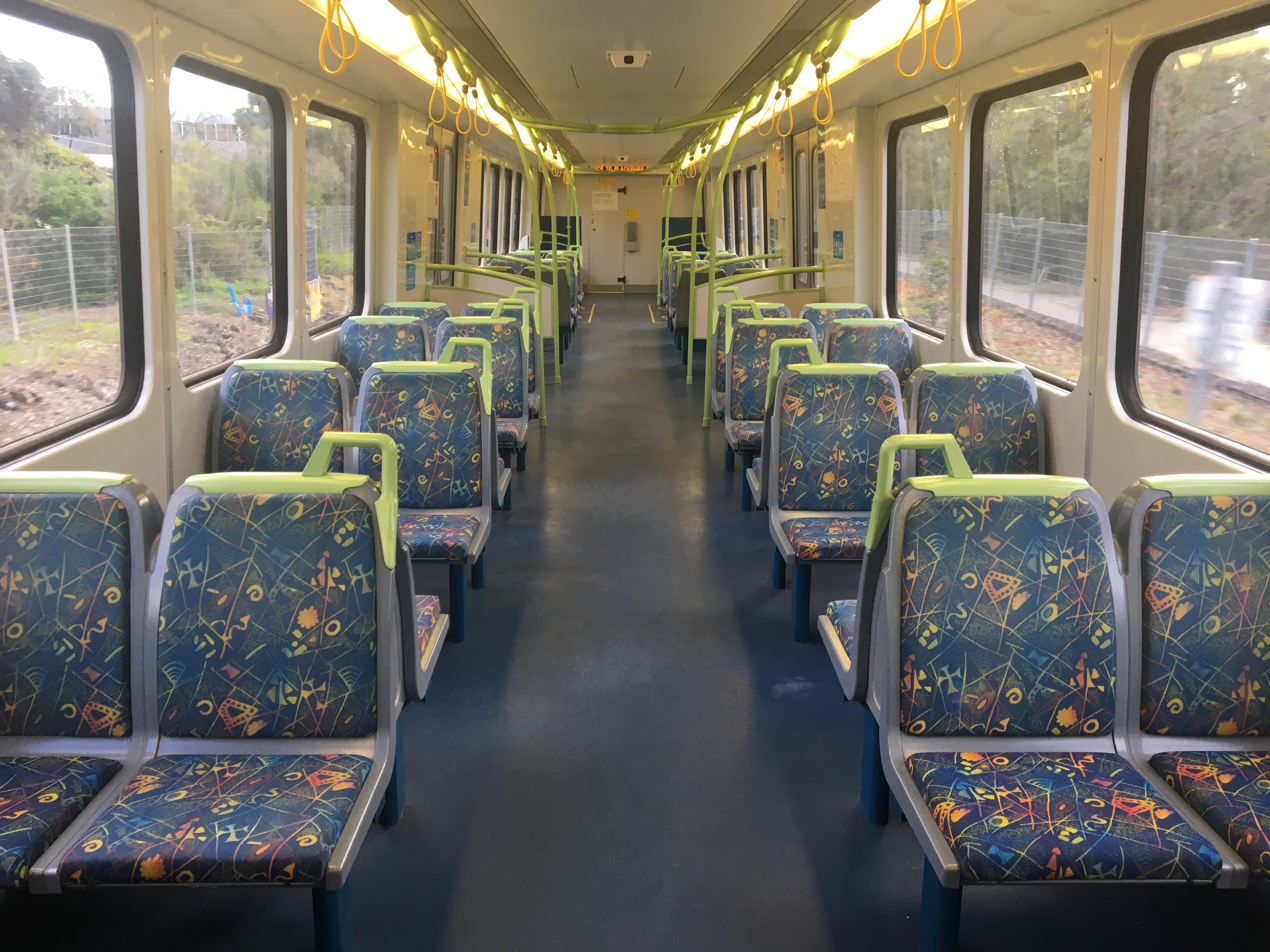
- Second generation X'Trapolis 100 interior
- In service: 2002–present
- Manufacturer: Alstom
- Assembly: Ballarat, Victoria (final assembly and fitout for units 11–58)
- Built at: La Rochelle, France (complete first 10 units and bodyshells for units 11–58)
- Family name: X'Trapolis
- Replaced: Hitachi
- Constructed: 2002–2004, 2009–2020
- Entered service: 27 December 2002
- Number built: 636 carriages (212 sets)
- Number in service: 633 carriages (211 sets) (Note: Three carriages stored after incidents, 898M interior burnt damage, 1627T derailed and has damage and 853M stored)
- Formation: 3-car sets (M–T–M). Often paired together as M-T-M--M-T-M 6-car sets.
- Fleet numbers: 1M–288M, 851M–986M, 1301T–1444T, 1626T–1693T
- Capacity: 216 seated (3-carriage set)
- Depots: Bayswater, Craigieburn, Epping and Newport Workshops
- Lines served: Lilydale Belgrave Alamein Glen Waverley; Hurstbridge Mernda; Frankston Werribee; Williamstown; Flemington Racecourse

Specifications
- Train length: 71.68 m (235 ft 2 1/16 in) over couplers
- Car length: M: 24.46 m (80 ft 3 in) over couplers; T: 22.76 m (74 ft 8 1/16 in) over couplers
- Width: 3,046 mm (9 ft 11 15/16 in)
- Height: 4,214 mm (13 ft 9 7/8 in)
- Floor height: 1,185 mm (3 ft 10.7 in)
- Wheel diameter: 890–820 mm (35–32 in)
- Wheelbase: 2.2 m (7 ft 3 in)
- Maximum speed: 143 km/h (89 mph) (design); 130 km/h (81 mph) (service)
- Weight: 43.34 t (42.66 long tons; 47.77 short tons) (M); 35.47 t (34.91 long tons; 39.10 short tons) (T)
- Traction system: Alstom ONIX 1500 IGBT–VVVF
- Traction motors: 8 × Alstom 4-ECA-1836-A 180 kW (240 hp) asynchronous 3-phase AC
- Power output: 1.44 MW (1,930 hp)
- Acceleration: 1.2 m/s^{2} (3.9 ft/s^{2})
- Deceleration: 1 m/s^{2} (3.3 ft/s^{2}) (service); 1.2 m/s^{2} (3.9 ft/s^{2}) (emergency)
- Electric systems: 1,500 V DC (nominal) from overhead catenary
- Current collection: Pantograph
- UIC classification: Bo′Bo′+2′2′+Bo′Bo′
- Bogies: CL 353
- Coupling system: Scharfenberg coupler
- Track gauge: 1,600 mm (5 ft 3 in) broad gauge

The X'Trapolis 100 is a type of single deck electric multiple unit part of Alstom's X'Trapolis family of trains, operated in Melbourne, Victoria, Australia and Valparaíso, Chile.

== Melbourne ==
=== In service ===
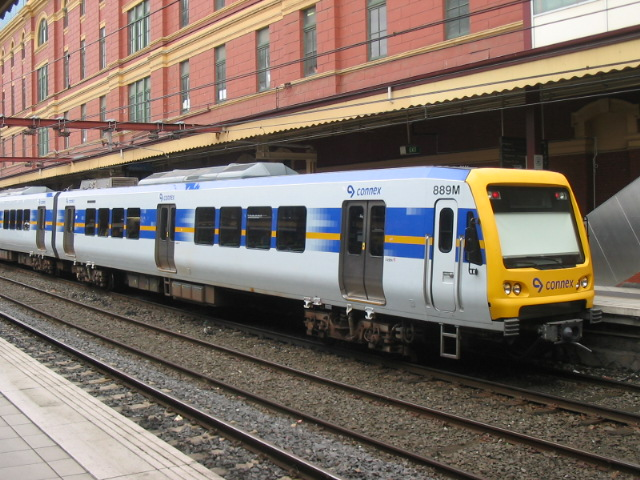
X'Trapolis 100 889M-1645T-890M in Connex livery, December 2005

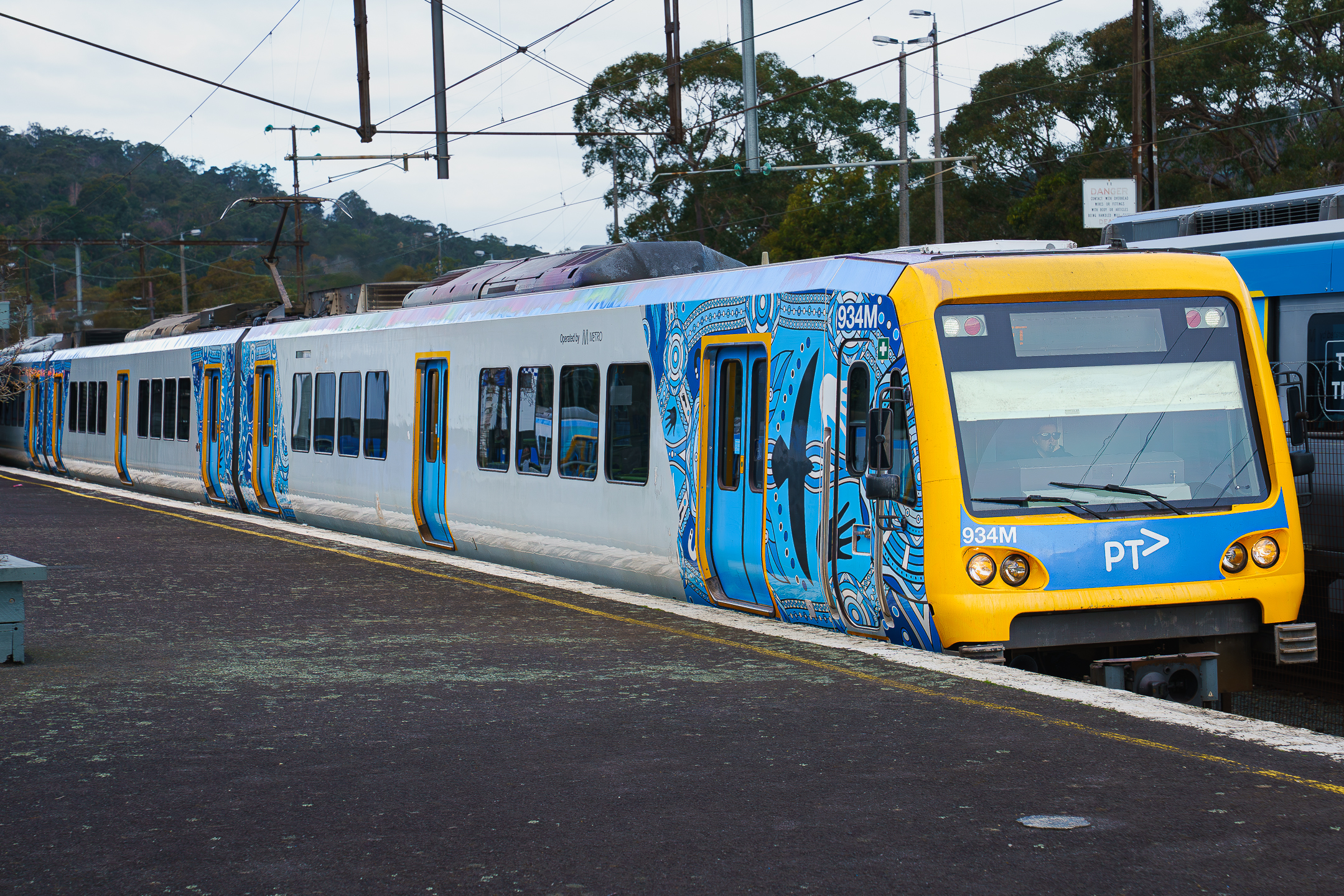
X'Trapolis 100 934M with Special Aboriginal Artwork livery at Upper Ferntree Gully, August 2025

As a partner of the Melbourne Transport Enterprises consortium, which was the new operator of the Hillside Trains network (later Connex Melbourne), it was announced in 1999 that Alstom would supply and deliver new trains to the Hillside Trains network.

When the trains were originally introduced to the suburban network in 2002, the trains operated only on the former Hillside Trains network (consisting of the Burnley and Clifton Hill group lines), and did not run revenue services elsewhere operated by M>Train on the Bayside Trains half of the system. Although the two networks merged in 2004, when Connex took over all operations, the X'trapolis units still did not operate on the Bayside system at the time.

On 22 October 2014, the operation of X'Trapolis 100 trains was expanded to include lines on the former Bayside Trains network with the Frankston line being cleared for their operation and initially running two weekday morning-peak services.

On 20 November 2016, X'Trapolis 100 trains were expanded to full-time running on the Frankston line and began operating services on the Werribee and Williamstown lines the same day.

In November 2018, X'Trapolis 100 trains’ operations were expanded to the Flemington Racecourse line.

X'Trapolis 100 trains had run on the Burnley, Clifton Hill and Cross-City groups, with all services operating with 6-car trains throughout the day except the Alamein (Camberwell - Alamein) and Williamstown (Newport - Williamstown) shuttles which runs with 3-car trains during shuttle operations off-peak and on weekends. The trains also serve the Flemington Racecourse line when services operate there, operating to both Showgrounds and Flemington Racecourse stations. However, the Flemington Racecourse Line only runs on special occasions.

Although Melbourne's trains operate as either one or two three-car units, it was not until September 2007 that the X'Trapolis 100s were permitted to operate as single-units in revenue service.

The trains have power-operated doors that open when a button on the door is pressed and are closed by the driver or closed automatically after approximately ten seconds.

The X'Trapolis 100s and the HCMT are currently the only suburban trains in Melbourne with external destination displays on the sides of the carriages with this feature also seen on the diesel powered Sprinter and VLocity rail motors.

Several trains were given names: Croydon West (primary school that won a naming contest), Don Corrie (deceased railway employee), Flash, Flinders Flyer, Iramoo (primary school that won a naming contest), Melbourne Rocks and Westernport. X'Trapolis 100 863M-1632T-864M-897M-1649T-898M was the first Melbourne train to receive the new ‘Metro’ livery in November 2009, in preparation for the launch of the new suburban operator. When the Connex livery was retired in place of the current Metro design, the Iramoo name (shown on units 851M and 852M) was erroneously written as Imaroo. This spelling was changed a little over a decade later.

=== Refurbishment ===
The sound of the X'Trapolis 100 horn.

As part of its 2009 franchise agreement, Metro Trains Melbourne was required to modify the 3+2 seating layout in all original X'Trapolis 100s to have 2+2 seating, providing efficiency in passenger flow and more standing room. Later orders of X'Trapolis 100s were delivered with this modified layout.

All cars prior to the sixth batch sets underwent an additional interior refurbishment program starting from 2017, similar to the refurbishment that the Siemens Nexas had recently completed. All X'Trapolis sets comprising the first–fifth orders had a number of seats removed at the ends of the motor cars to create dedicated spaces for passengers using wheelchairs and also provide standing room for additional passengers, thus increasing overall capacity, accessibility and passenger flow of each motor carriage. Additional handrails and emergency assistance intercoms were also installed in accordance to the same interior design of the motor cars since the sixth batch.

=== Mechanics ===
Mechanically, these trains are very different from the previous generation Melbourne trains. The X'Trapolis 100 was the first EMU in Melbourne to have computer-controlled traction, braking and safety systems. A continuous electrical circuit runs along the length of the train which, when energised, allows the train's emergency brakes to release. The circuit will be de-energised by a number of events, such as the driver releasing a vigilance control, applying an emergency brake or passing a signal at stop. This will cause the train to apply all brakes.

=== Incidents ===
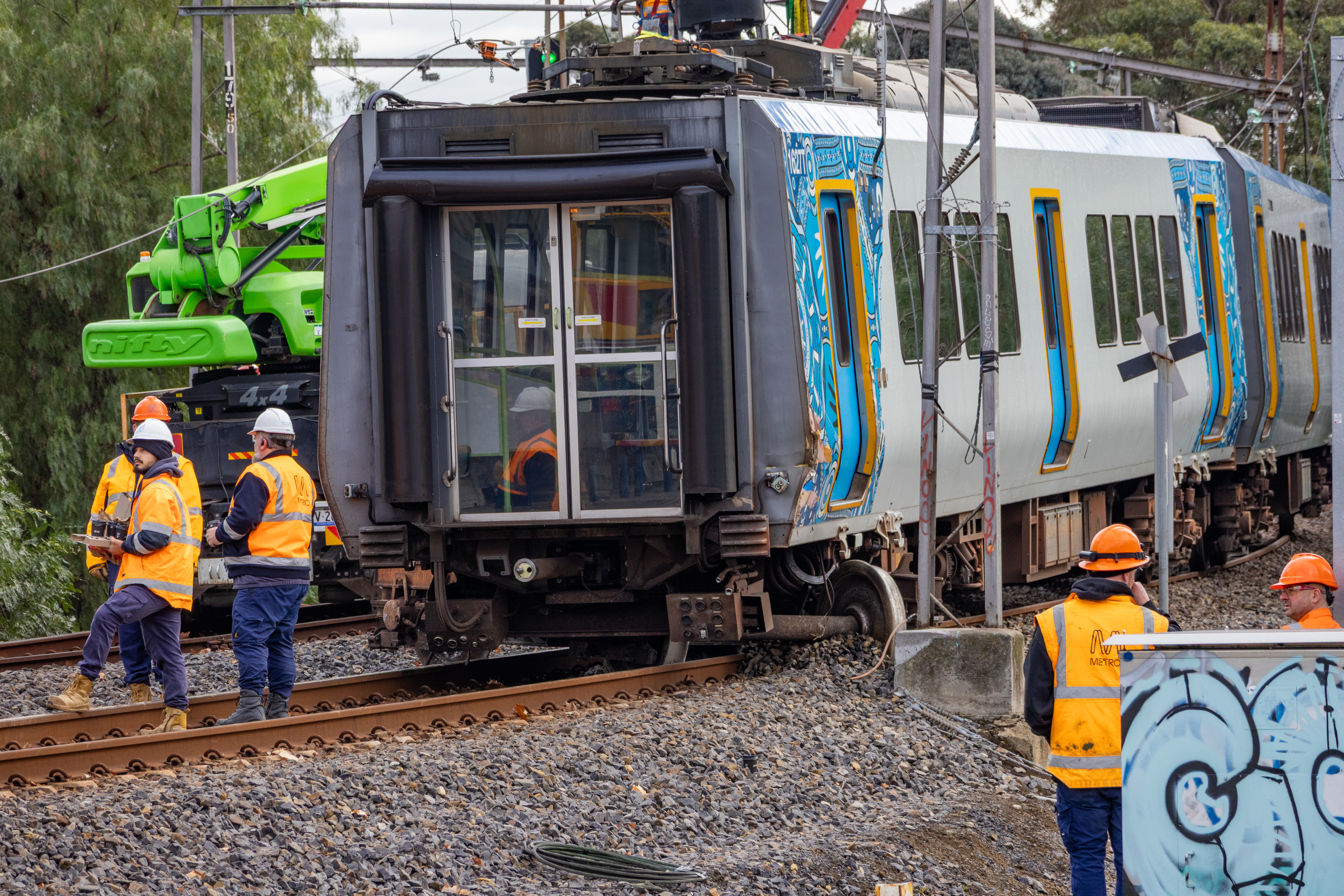
1627T derailed near Clifton Hill station which occurred on 13 July 2025

On 9 December 2004, 882M overran the platform at Belgrave and crashed into the fence at the end of the line.

On 26 September 2009, 872M crashed into a car between Croydon and Mooroolbark, derailed on impact and destroyed an overhead power stanchion. The Ford Fairmont had crashed down the embankment onto the tracks and was abandoned prior to the train collision. Coincidentally, on 3 January 2013, a Hitachi train derailed in the same location on the city-bound line due to rails buckling in hot weather.

On 12 May 2010, an almost brand new 9M overran a siding in Ringwood, derailing and crashing into the siding fence. The train had entered service less than a month prior.

On 24 March 2011, 920M overran the dead-end platform at Macleod, crashing into the fence at the end of the platform. Prior to the accident, the platform had recently been washed and the soapy water had ended up on the tracks causing a complete loss of friction. Additionally, it was found that the end-of-line baulks (two wooden sleepers placed across the rails in lieu of a buffer stop) were also defective; the train wheels simply pushed them along the rails.

On the morning of 11 November 2015, an individual later identified as a then Metro employee gained access to the cabin of an X'Trapolis 100 six-car set stored at the depot of Hurstbridge station and drove it into a derail block, causing it to be derailed. 927M received the most damage in the incident from ploughing into an adjacent X'Trapolis set, whilst other carriages and track equipment were damaged. All carriages are expected to be back in revenue service after being repaired.

On 6 February 2016, 1305T, led by 9M, derailed just before Rushall station city-bound, where the track is on a very tight 30 km/h (18.6 mph) bend. The South Morang line was partially suspended while the carriage was placed back onto tracks.

On 9 November 2018, a Lilydale-bound service, led by 959M, uncoupled in running shortly after departing Croydon station, splitting into two three-car units, with the trailing unit coming to a stop under emergency braking. The subsequent investigation found that a wiring error during a modification to the train's low-note whistle on 959M, combined with a deterioration of insulation resistance in the uncouple solenoid connector of 882M (the leading carriage of the trailing unit), resulted in an error circuit forming which resulted in the unintended coupling.

On 12 August 2021, X'Trapolis set 871M-1636T-872M collided with a semi-trailer truck at the High Street Road level crossing near Glen Iris station before 8am, causing damage to the train only. Substantial damage was caused to the overhead structure by the truck, and the front bogie of the train derailed. After recovery efforts, the set was then taken to Epping Workshops.

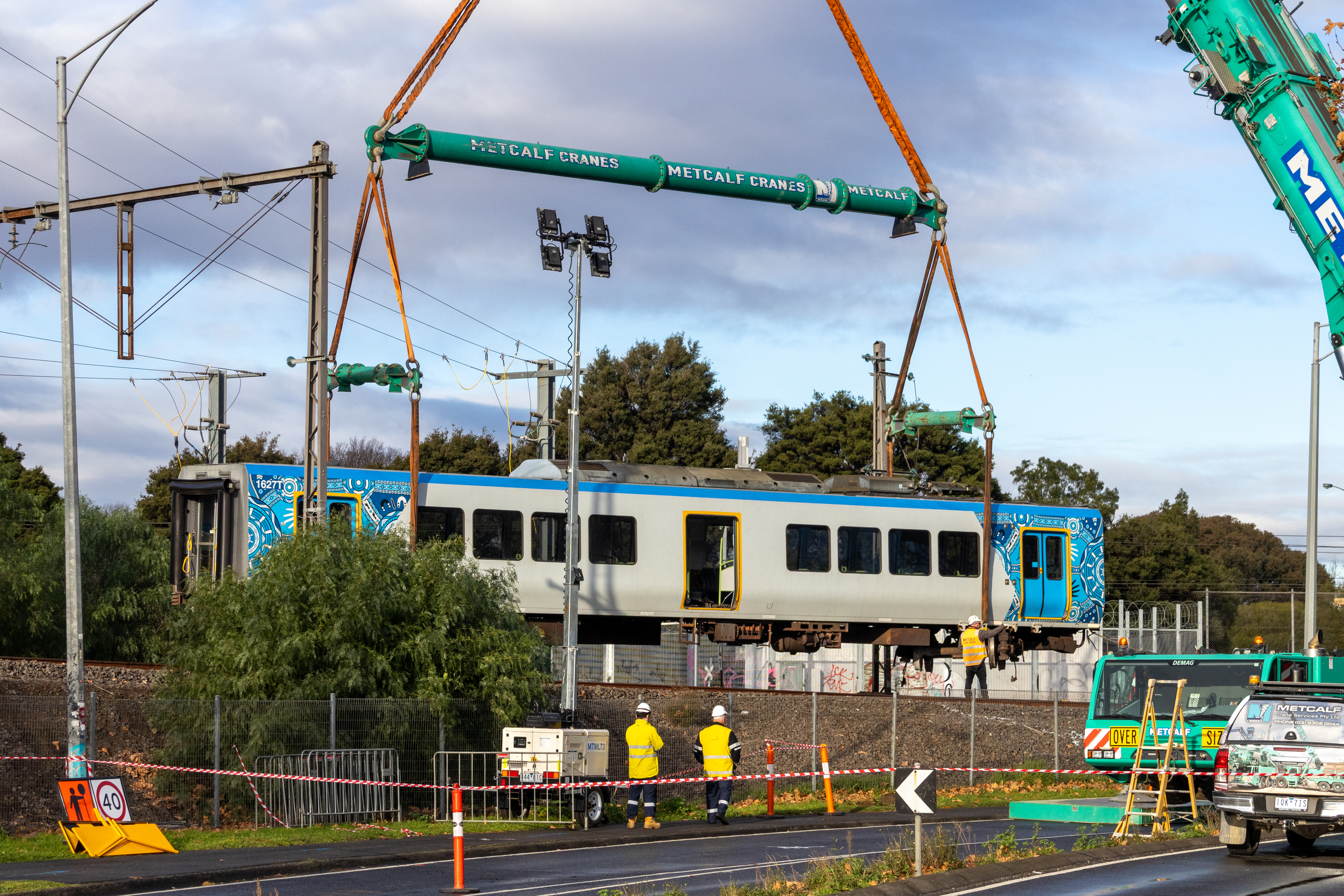
1627T had to be lifted by crane in the derailment near Clifton Hill station, the derailment caused the line closure of nearly 10 days in July 2025

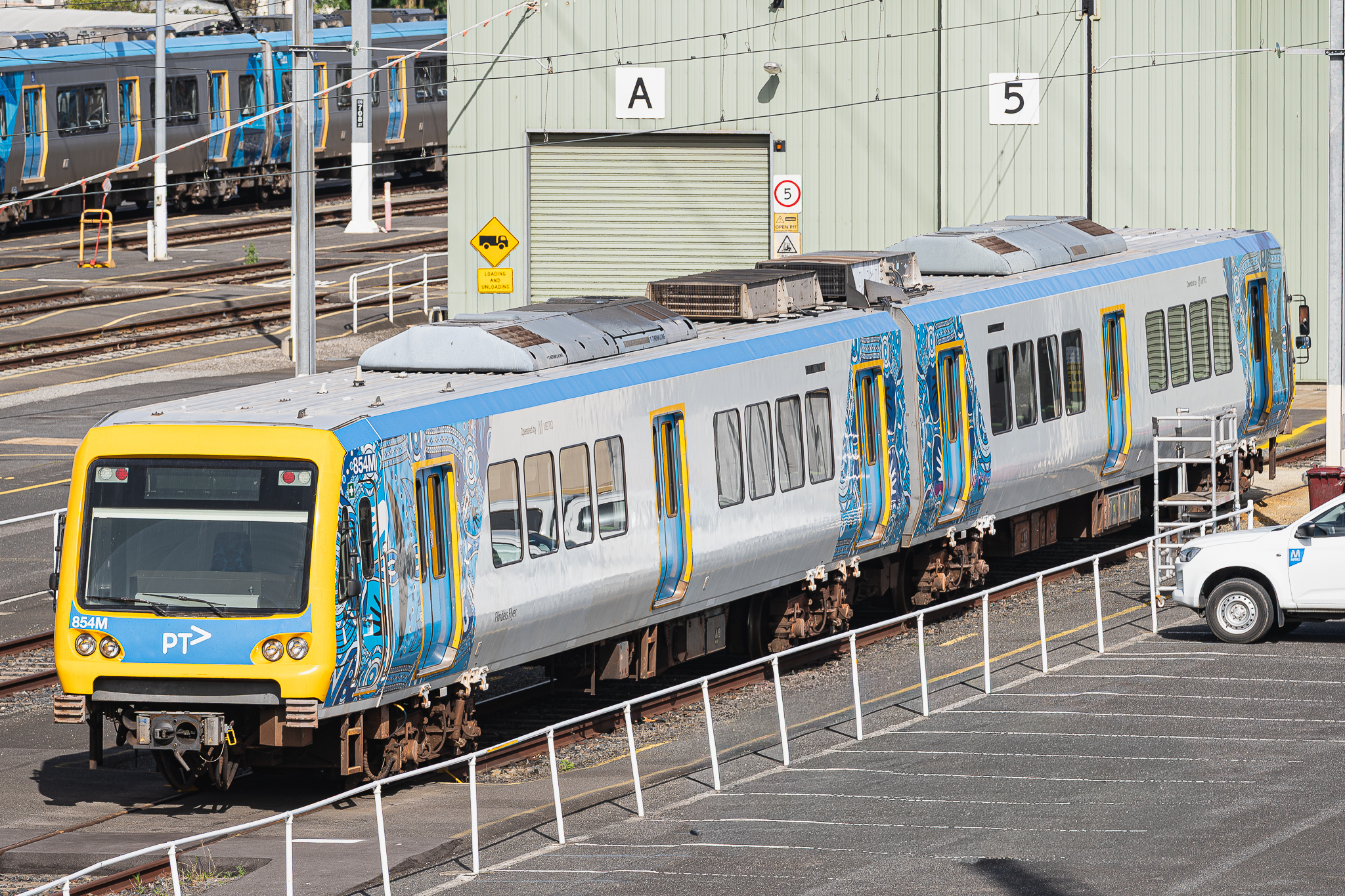
2-car X'Trapolis (853M-854M) stored at Westall Maintenance Centre, October 2025

On 13 July 2025, X'Trapolis trailer carriage 1627T derailed at a curve on a bridge over a road just north of Clifton Hill station; none of the approximately 30 passengers onboard the train or the train crew were injured, although the derailment damaged trackside infrastructure and forced a days long closure of the Hurstbridge and Mernda lines. Investigations found that as the train was passing through the curve, the leading left wheels of 1627T climbed over the adjacent rail before the carriage collided with a stanchion supporting overhead wires delivering power to the train. The rails the train derailed on were laid during trackwork several days before the incident (8 and 9 July), along with the replacement of sleepers and ballast, although a cause for the incident has not been identified.

Order	Sets	Ordered	First Entered	Last Entered	Note
First	58	2000 by Connex	December 2002	December 2004	To fulfil a franchise commitment to replace its fleet of ageing Hitachi trains. The first ten units were completely assembled at Alstom's La Rochelle factory in France. However, since the eleventh unit, only the body shells were assembled at La Rochelle, with the rest of the train being assembled in Victoria at Alstom's Ballarat facility. The first set ran a special trip from Flinders Street to South Kensington and back to mark the event. The trains differ from earlier trains on the Melbourne network in the following ways: Doors open when button pressed; Sliding doors between carriages; 1 pantograph per three-car train
Second & Third	76 (Total)	July 2007 by Victorian Government	December 2009	April 2012	In July 2007 the Government of Victoria announced that Alstom was one of two companies invited to bid to build 10 new six-car trains for the existing network. Siemens Transportation Systems was the other company, and both were limited to supplying trains that were the same as those already supplied to Melbourne. The Department of Infrastructure found that the new trains delivered less than one additional peak-hour service across the entire network, and had initially lobbied the Government to buy 20 six-car trains. In October 2007 the tender was extended to 18 six-car trains, to be delivered by 2010. The tender was awarded to Alstom in December 2007 and the trains were delivered in a staged roll-out from late 2009. In February 2009 an additional order was placed, with 20 more six-car trains added, taking the total to 38 trains. The first of 19 trains that were built by Alstom in Italy were loaded onto a ship in July 2009, with the first set arriving at Newport Workshops on 24 August 2009. The remaining 19 trains were assembled at United Group's Ballarat plant, under a state government requirement for a minimum of 40% local content. The new trains were originally used in revenue service on lines already cleared for their operation, with some Comeng trains on these lines being cascaded across to the other side of the network. By late September the new units, numbered 1M-1301T-2M and 3M-1302T-4M, were moved into the open at the Newport Workshops and had been taken out on test runs without any livery applied. By October the train had received carriage numbers and names, with compatibility testing being carried out with a modified member of the existing fleet. By December 2009 the first set had received the Metro Trains Melbourne livery, and was running stopping-all-stations test runs without passengers on the Epping line. The second train to be imported was taken to Ballarat immediately after arrival due to floor damage, with Alstom and United Group Rail spending two months making repairs. This train was transferred to Melbourne on 28 February. X'Trapolis 100 sets from this order differed slightly from a passenger perspective. The trains were delivered with improved internal and external display screens. All external side of carriage screens and windscreen destination displays were replaced with a larger, bolder font. The same improvement was made to the internal carriage display screens with all first-generation X'Trapolis 100s later being re fitted with the same larger displays. Improvements were also made to the internal audio systems along with minor technical improvements for drivers. The first train entered revenue service for a few hours on 30 December 2009, despite claims that train drivers were still having problems with the train, including getting the onboard passenger information display units to work, the train being taken out of service the next day. On 15 February 2010 rail operator Metro planned to reintroduce the train into service, but drivers refused to operate it, citing unresolved safety issues. As a result, Metro took the Rail, Tram and Bus Union to the federal industrial tribunal. On 18 February union representatives and Metro management met for private talks before Fair Work Australia, on 20 February an agreement was reached for the train to enter service that afternoon, an event that became a media circus.
Fourth	14	2011	October 2012	June 2013	
Fifth	16	April 2013	December 2014	October 2015	Carriages from these sets onwards have had a number of seats removed from the front of the motor carriages to improve comfort and capacity, creating dedicated space for passengers using mobility scooters and further preventing congregation in the doorways.
Sixth	10	March 2015	October 2016	February 2017	The sixth batch sets have had additional seats removed and additional horizontal handrails have been fitted around the walls in the front and rear carriages as well as the installation of additional emergency assistance intercoms. These modifications were eventually retro-fitted into the whole X'Trapolis fleet, meaning that all sets now share the same interior seating layout.
Seventh	10	May 2016	August 2017	December 2017	
Eighth	18	September 2016	January 2018	January 2019	At the time of this order, the Victorian Government committed to purchasing 65 High Capacity Metro Trains of a different type which are currently being constructed.
Ninth	10	May 2018 (Final)	November 2019	July 2020	This final order continued the X'Trapolis 100 production line in Victoria until 2020. Motor carriage numbers from this order will resume from 967M, following on from the numbering of the earliest X'Trapolis sets delivered in 2004. This is due to X'Trapolis 100 trains being unable to exceed motor carriage number 300M, as some older Melbourne Comeng trains are currently numbered from 301M onwards.

== Valparaíso ==
X'Trapolis 100 (Valparaíso)
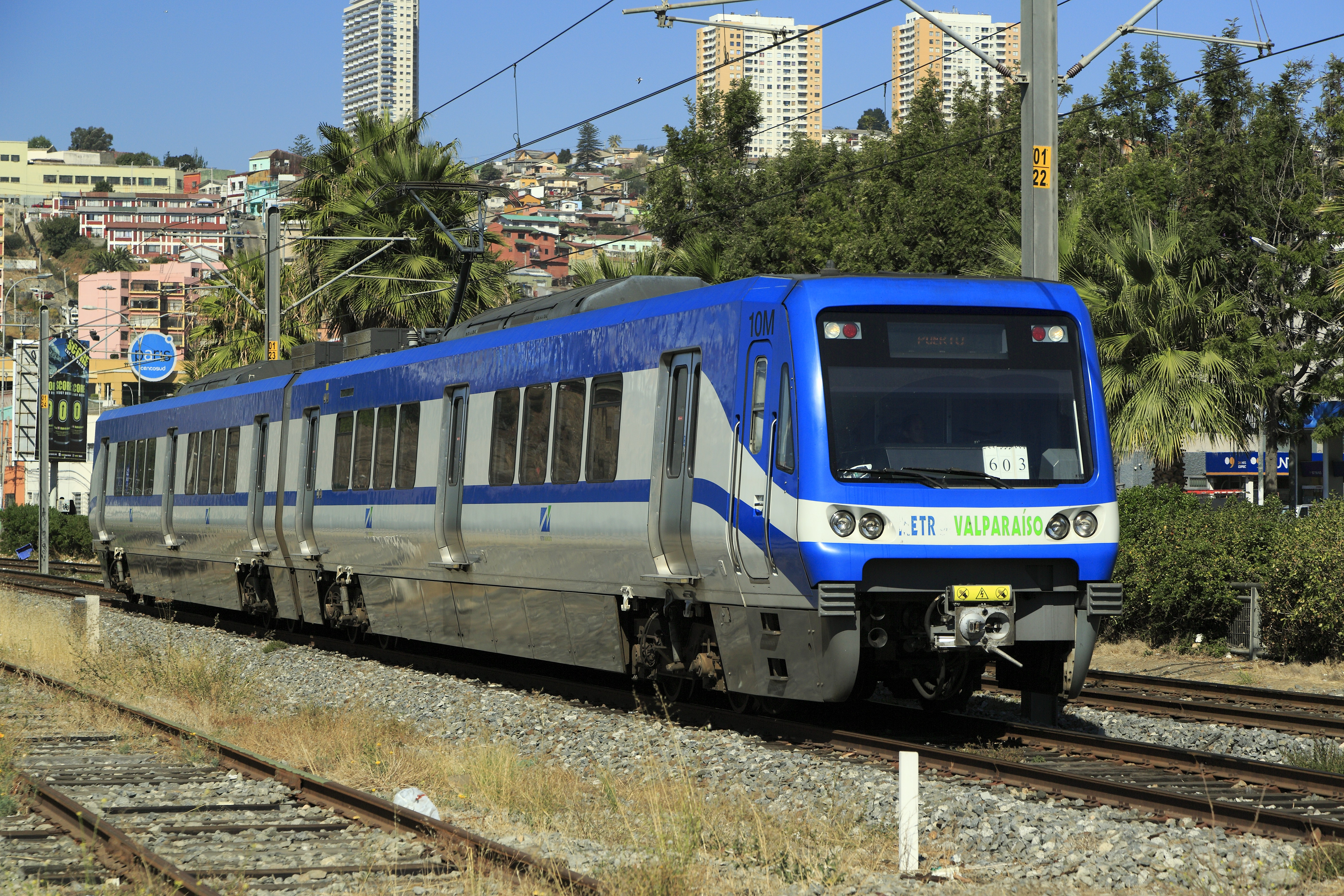

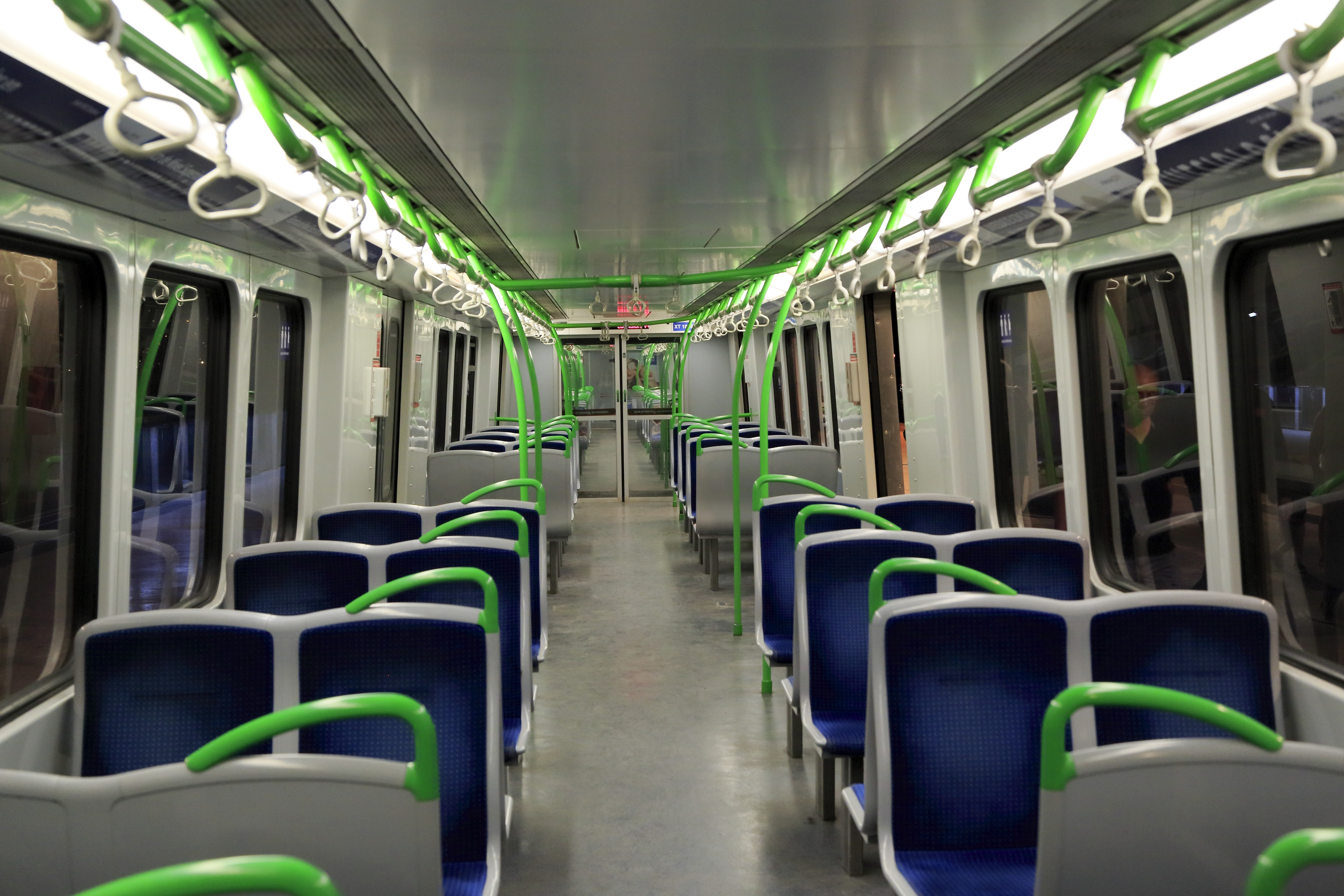
- Manufacturer: Alstom
- Number built: 27 sets
- Number in service: 27 sets
- Formation: 2-car sets (M–R)
- Fleet numbers: 01–27
- Capacity: 144 seated per 2-car unit

Specifications
- Train length: 48.92 m (160 ft 6 in) over couplers
- Car length: 24.46 m (80 ft 3 in) over couplers
- Maximum speed: 143 km/h (89 mph) (design); 120 km/h (75 mph) (service)
- Weight: 86.68 t (85.31 long tons; 95.55 short tons)
- Traction motors: 4 × 180 kW (240 hp)
- Power output: 720 kW (970 hp)
- Electric systems: 3 kV DC (nominal) from overhead catenary
- UIC classification: Bo′Bo′+2′2′
- Safety systems: CTC and ATP
- Track gauge: 1,676 mm (5 ft 6 in) broad gauge

Notes/references
- Same specifications as Melbourne version except where noted

Valparaíso has had an interurban passenger train system since the 19th century, but it could not be called a metro due to an infrequent train service and other shortcomings. In 1999 construction began on the current system, tearing down the old stations and building new ones with a homologous design. In Viña del Mar, a tunnel more than five kilometres in length was constructed. The new trains, specially made for the new system, arrived in Chile on 22 February 2005 and the old system was decommissioned on 30 June 2005.

The metropolitan railway that opened in 1855 between the Barón station in Valparaíso and El Salto, near Viña del Mar, is the oldest continuously operating railway in the southern hemisphere. At the end of the 1990s, the decision was made to renew the railway equipment, equip the region with state-of-the-art trains and, at the same time, organise a new functional structure with new stations and the undergrounding of an important part of the route.

The purchase of the rolling stock was completed in November 2002, with the signing of a contract between Merval and the French company Alstom, which in addition to guaranteeing the delivery of 27 convoys of 2 cars, included signaling, control systems and electrical power, as well of various items that ensured maintenance for 30 years.

The work for the implementation of this project, called Stage IV, began in 1999, with the demolition of the solid construction stations, replacing them with bus stops, and only remodeling the Limache station for the new uses that would later be given to it, making them architectural homologation and functionally. The road was buried with the construction of a tunnel of more than 5 kilometres between the Caleta Abarca and El Salto sectors in the Viña del Mar commune, leaving 4 stations under the street line, and allowing a restructuring of the fascia urban environment via Vina Mar. The work on the tunnel suspended the service was between July and November 2005.

The first car of the new fleet arrived in Chile on 22 February 2005. On 30 June 2005, a farewell ceremony was held for the old Suburban Electric Motor Vehicles (AES), built in Argentina by Fiat Concord, which provided commercial service until July 2005. At 12:45pm a "symbolic" tour began that began in Valparaíso and concluded in Limache. Thus, stations, bus stops and the signalling system completed their last day.

The service began with a 3-day white march, operating partially outside the tunnel between 21 and 23 November 2005. On 23 November, the inauguration ceremony was held, which was attended by the then President of Chile Ricardo Lagos. The service formally began on 24 November 2005.

=== Merval rolling stock ===
Unlike the Melbourne version, Merval trains do not have intermediate cars. They only consist of two cars with a cabin, one motor (which has the pantograph) and another trailer. They can also operate as double units, forming convoys of 4 wagons, but always smaller than the Melbourne version.

The door system is the same as in the Melbourne version. The doors are activated by pressing a button on the door and are closed by the driver or after two minutes. Each car has three passenger doors per side, which gives a total of six doors per single car and 12 per trainset.

Each car has a single pantograph that delivers energy to the motor car from the catenary available throughout the network.

Due to the lack of a catenary, the trains do not operate beyond the Limache station, although the possibility of extending Merval's service to La Calera is being analysed.

=== Changes in passenger seats ===
Contrary to what was done in Melbourne, Merval announced a reduction in seat capacity of its trains, to be implemented between October and December 2014. This reduction seeks to increase train capacity to meet the growing demand of passengers. Although exact figures were not provided, a reduction of approximately 46 seats per train is expected, to be homologated to the 96 that the X'Trapolis Modular has, a model of which 8 unit arrived in 2015 to reinforce Merval's fleet

=== Antimicrobial trains ===
In a pilot plan between state copper company Codelco and Alstom, one car was modified to include antimicrobial copper in the handrails and contact areas. The modification, which included the removal of handles and panels, is part of the search for new uses for copper that Codelco carries out as part of its market development plan.

However, months later, the copper railings were removed and the car returned to its original condition.
