= North Melbourne railway station =

Railway station in Melbourne, Australia

North Melbourne
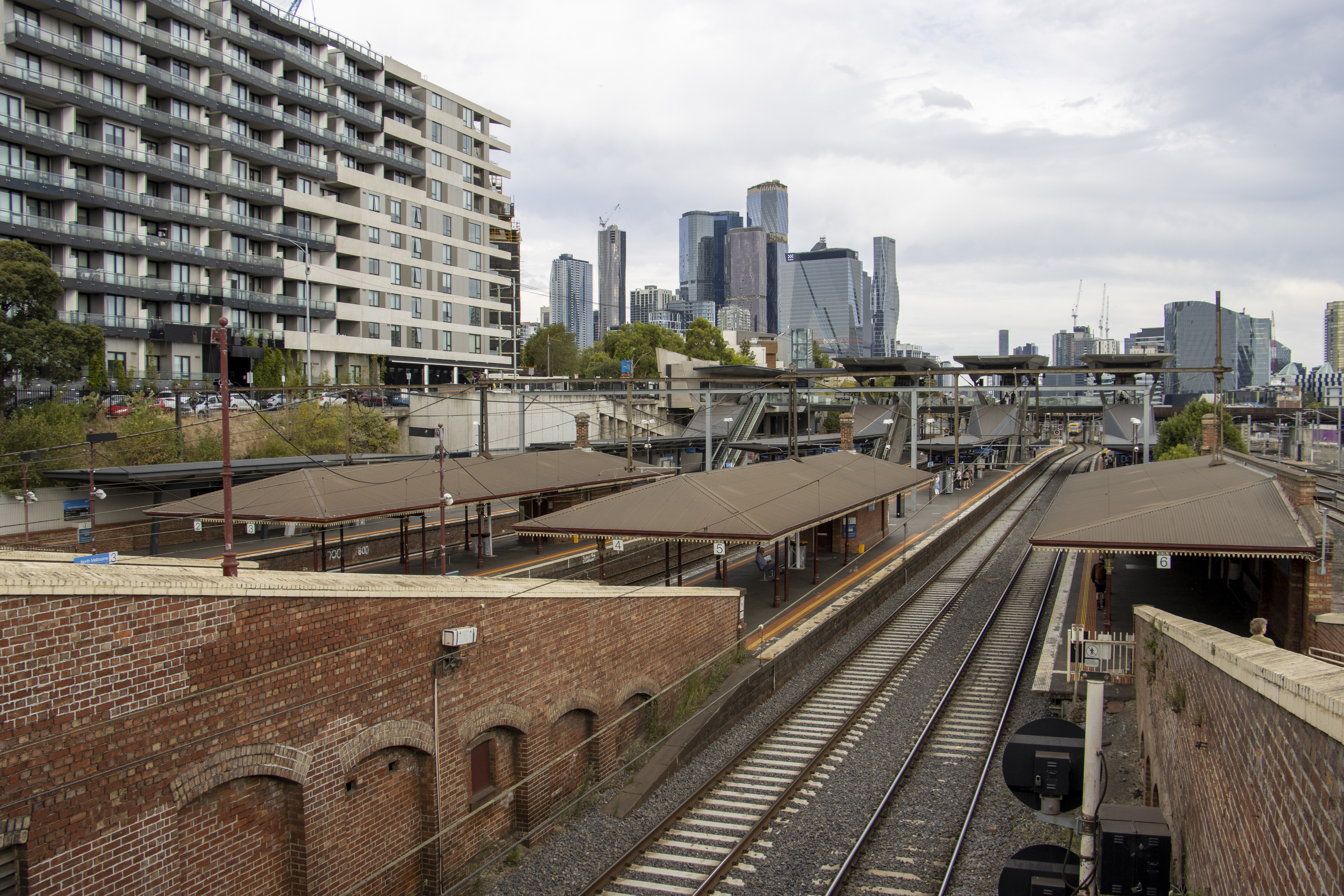
- Southbound view of Platforms 5 and 6, March 2023

General information
- Location: Railway Place, West Melbourne, Victoria 3003; City of Melbourne; Australia
- Coordinates: 37°48′23″S 144°56′28″E
- System: PTV commuter and regional rail station
- Owner: VicTrack
- Operator: Metro Trains; V/Line
- Lines: Metropolitan: Craigieburn Upfield; Flemington Racecourse (Note: Special events only); Werribee Williamstown; Regional: Seymour Shepparton (Tocumwal)
- Distance: 1.68 kilometres from Southern Cross
- Platforms: 6 (2 side, 2 island)
- Tracks: 6
- Connections: Bus

Construction
- Structure type: Ground
- Cycle facilities: Yes
- Accessible: Yes – step free access

Other information
- Status: Operational, premium station
- Station code: NME
- Fare zone: Myki zone 1
- Website: Public Transport Victoria

History
- Opened: 6 October 1859; 167 years ago
- Rebuilt: 9 June 1886; 1974; 16 November 2009
- Electrified: May 1919 (1500 V DC overhead)

Passengers
2005–2018 numbers
| 2005–2006 | 557,994 |
| 2006–2007 | 580,713 ▲4.07% |
| 2007–2008 | 670,669 ▲15.49% |
| 2008–2009 | 686,186 ▲2.31% |
| 2009–2010 | 845,063 ▲23.15% |
| 2010–2011 | 1,090,814 ▲29.1% |
| 2011–2012 | 1,258,061 ▲15.33% |
| 2012–2013 | Not measured |
| 2013–2014 | 1,479,142 ▲17.57% |
| 2014–2015 | 1,266,281 ▼14.39% |
| 2015–2016 | 1,229,477 ▼2.9% |
| 2016–2017 | 1,324,944 ▲7.76% |
| 2017–2018 | 1,298,415 ▼2% |
- 2018–2019: 1,497,300 ▲15.32%
- 2019–2020: 1,183,050 ▼21%
- 2020–2021: 669,700 ▼43.4%
- 2021–2022: 703,500 ▲5.04%
- 2022–2023: 1,144,850 ▲47.76%
- 2023–2024: 1,220,400 ▲6.39%

Services
| Preceding station | Metro Trains | Following station |
See City Loop for operating patterns
| Southern Cross or Flagstaff towards Flinders Street | Craigieburn line | Kensington towards Craigieburn |
| Southern Cross or Flagstaff towards Flinders Street | Upfield line | Macaulay towards Upfield |
Direct to Flinders Street
| Southern Cross towards Flinders Street | Flemington Racecourse line | Showgrounds towards Showgrounds or Flemington Racecourse |
| Southern Cross towards Sandringham via Flinders Street | Werribee line | South Kensington towards Laverton, Werribee or Williamstown |
| Southern Cross towards Sandringham via Flinders Street | Williamstown line | South Kensington towards Laverton, Werribee or Williamstown |
| Preceding station | V/Line | Following station |
| Southern Cross Terminus | Seymour line Weekdays only | Broadmeadows towards Seymour |
| Southern Cross Terminus | Seymour line Weekdays only | Essendon Peak service only towards Seymour |
| Southern Cross Terminus | Shepparton line 2 weekday peak services | Broadmeadows towards Shepparton |
Out of station connection
| Preceding station | Metro Trains | Following station |
| Parkville towards East Pakenham or Cranbourne | Sunbury line transfer at Arden | Footscray towards Sunbury |
Location

North Melbourne station is a railway station operated by Metro Trains Melbourne and V/Line on the metropolitan Craigieburn, Flemington Racecourse, Upfield, Werribee and Williamstown lines; and the regional Seymour line. It is part of the Melbourne and Victorian railway networks. It serves the inner north-western suburb of West Melbourne, in Melbourne, Victoria, Australia.

North Melbourne is a ground level premium station and major junction, featuring six platforms: two side platforms, and two island platforms with two faces each. It opened on 6 October 1859, with the current station provided in 2009.

The station is listed on the Victorian Heritage Register.

== History ==
The first railway through the site of North Melbourne station was today's Williamstown line, and the first section of the Melbourne, Mount Alexander and Murray River Railway Company line (to Sunbury), which both opened on 13 January 1859. On 6 October 1859, the first passenger station, with two platforms, was opened, and on 9 June 1886, the present six-platform station opened.

The new station was of free classical architecture. Red brick was used, with cream brick banding, along with verandas and cast iron lace work. As built in 1886, North Melbourne had six platforms, with four platform buildings containing ladies' toilets and a ladies' waiting room. The main booking office, waiting room and station master's office were near the ramp to Platform 1, and the men's toilets and porters' offices were located under the ramps themselves.

In December 1973, the suburban train stabling yard to the north of the station opened, as part of the City Loop project. The footbridge that links the sidings with the Macaulay stabling yard was also provided around that time. In 1974, the station buildings on the northern concourse were provided and, in the 1980s, as part of the construction works for the City Loop, the ramps to Platforms 1 and 2 were altered, and the platform extended at the down end.

In May 1995, a washing plant and additional sidings in Melbourne Yard, located to the west of the station, were provided, as part of the Jolimont Yard rationalisation. On 19 July 1996, North Melbourne was upgraded to a premium station.

In May 2006, it was announced that the station was to be redeveloped as part of a $36 million project. Work included a new main entrance at the up (southern) end of the station, with escalators, stairs and lifts installed for quicker access to other platforms and to cater for disabled passengers. Work started in May 2007, and was completed on 16 November 2009. To aid construction and avoid disruption to train passengers, a crash deck was erected over the tracks, to allow trains to run normally underneath while building work continued overhead.

In March 2008, bus route 401 began operating from North Melbourne to the Royal Melbourne Hospital and University of Melbourne in Carlton and Parkville, removing the need for passengers to those destinations to travel via the City Loop.

After December 2013, V/Line Geelong and Warrnambool services no longer stopped at the station, due to the opening of the first section of the Regional Rail Link (RRL) between Southern Cross and South Kensington. The line runs to the west of North Melbourne, but no platforms were provided. On 11 July 2014, Ballarat, Ararat, Bendigo, Swan Hill and Echuca line services also ceased stopping at North Melbourne, having moved to the RRL tracks.

In November 2017, the Victorian State Government announced that North Melbourne would be renamed West Melbourne, to better reflect its geographical location, and to allow one of the new stations constructed as part of the Metro Tunnel project to be named North Melbourne. The change was abandoned in 2020, with the Metro Tunnel station being named Arden instead.

On 1 February 2026, the Sunbury line ceased stopping at North Melbourne station as part of a timetable revision which saw all services on the line rerouted via the new Metro Tunnel.

== Platforms, facilities and services ==
North Melbourne has six platforms: two side platforms and two island platforms with four faces. It is served by Craigieburn, Upfield, Werribee and Williamstown line trains, as well as V/Line Seymour and Shepparton line services.

The main station entrance is at the southern end of the platforms, at the intersection of Adderley and Dryburgh Streets. The station building contains the main booking office, public toilets and a kiosk, with platform access via escalators and lifts. At the north end, the original asphalt ramps link all six platforms, with Platforms 2 through to 6 having heritage-listed verandas and brick waiting rooms.

At the north end of the station are 1970s-era brown brick buildings, built over the former Dynon Road overpass, which include public toilets and the former railway parcels office. Until November 2009, that building was also the main exit to Ireland Street and Railway Place, and contained the booking office and a kiosk, until those facilities were moved to the new concourse at the south end. The north end also has an exit leading west to the Melbourne Yard rail freight terminal, which is not open to public access.

=== Metropolitan ===
North Melbourne platform arrangement
| Platform | Line | Destination | Via | Service Pattern | Notes | Source |
|---|---|---|---|---|---|---|
| 1 | Upfield line | Flinders Street | City Loop | All stations | See City Loop for operating patterns | |
| 2 | Upfield line | Upfield | | All stations | | |
| 3 | Craigieburn line | Flinders Street | City Loop | All stations | See City Loop for operating patterns | |
| 4 | Craigieburn line | Craigieburn | | All stations | | |
| 5 | Werribee line Williamstown line | Flinders Street or Sandringham | Flinders Street | All stations | | |
| 6 | Werribee line | Laverton or Werribee | | All stations | Services to Laverton only operate on weekdays. | |
| 6 | Williamstown line | Williamstown | | All stations | | |

=== Regional ===
North Melbourne platform arrangement
| Platform | Line | Destination | Service Pattern | Notes |
|---|---|---|---|---|
| 1 | Seymour line Shepparton line | Southern Cross | Weekday services for Seymour line, two weekday services for Shepparton line | Pick up only |
| 2 | Seymour line Shepparton line | Seymour or Shepparton | Weekday services for Seymour line, two weekday services for Shepparton line | Set down only |

=== Special Event services ===
North Melbourne platform arrangement
| Platform | Line | Destination | Service Pattern | Notes |
|---|---|---|---|---|
| 1 | Flemington Racecourse line | Southern Cross | All stations | Special event days only |
| 2 | Flemington Racecourse line | Showgrounds or Flemington Racecourse | Express services | Special event days only |
| 5 | Flemington Racecourse line | Flinders Street | All stations | Special event days only |
| 6 | Flemington Racecourse line | Showgrounds or Flemington Racecourse | Express services | Special event days only |

=== Station diagram ===
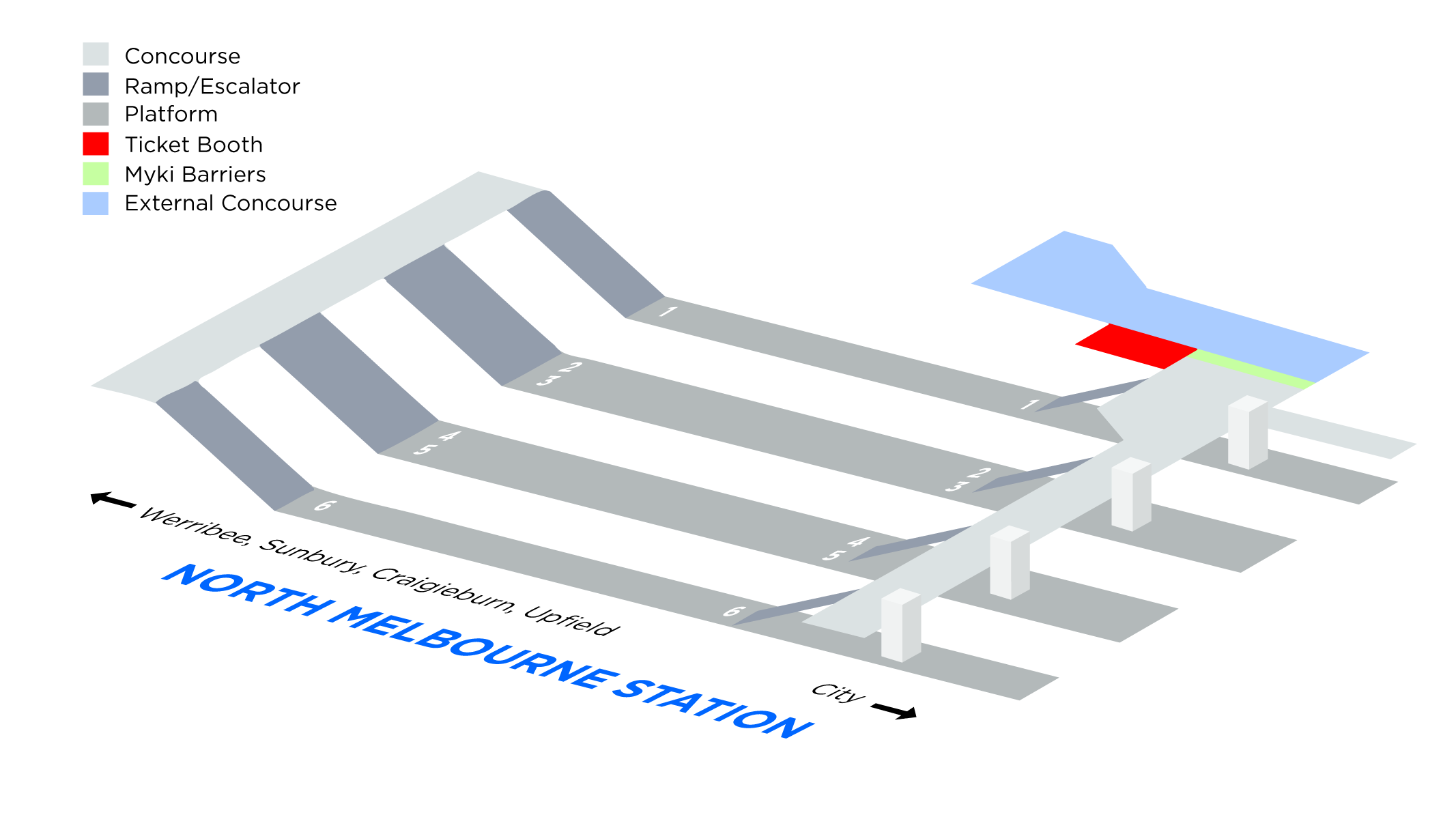
Schematic diagram of the station

== Transport links ==
Two bus routes operate via North Melbourne station, under contract to Public Transport Victoria:

- 216 : Sunshine station – Queen Street City (operated by Kinetic Melbourne)
- 241 : North Melbourne station – Yarra Bend Park (operated by Transit Systems Victoria)

== Gallery ==
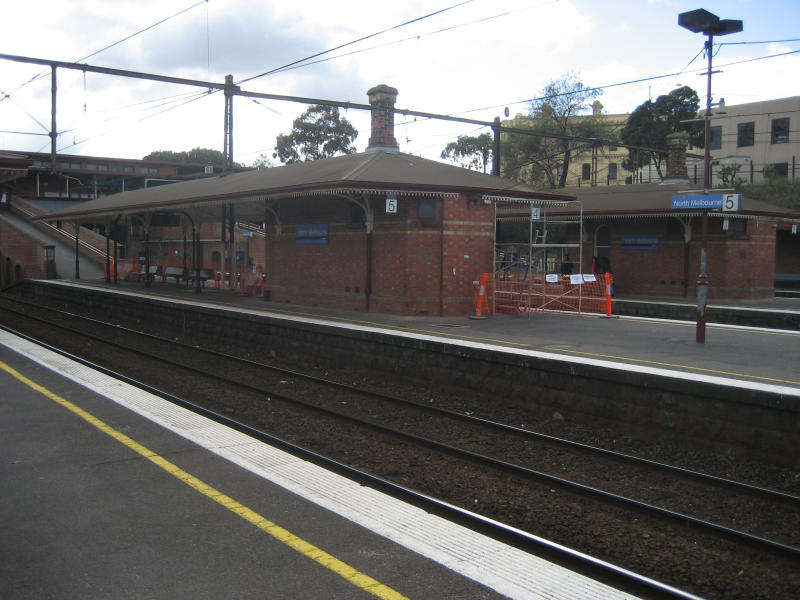
Northbound view from Platform 6, May 2007

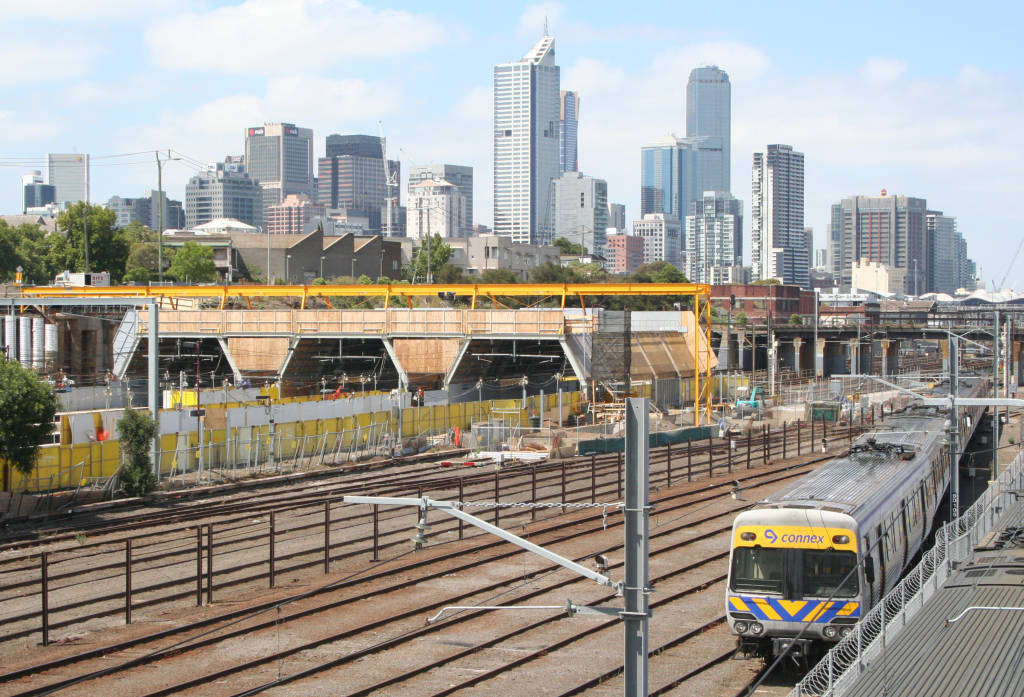
Construction work on the new southern concourse, February 2008

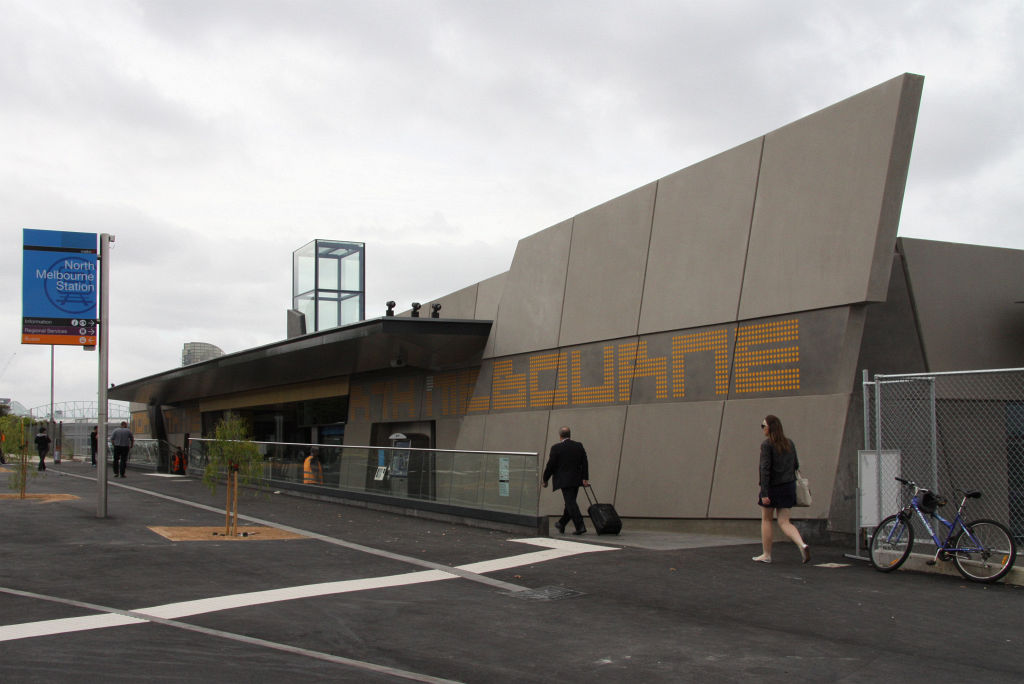
Station forecourt and entrance, November 2009

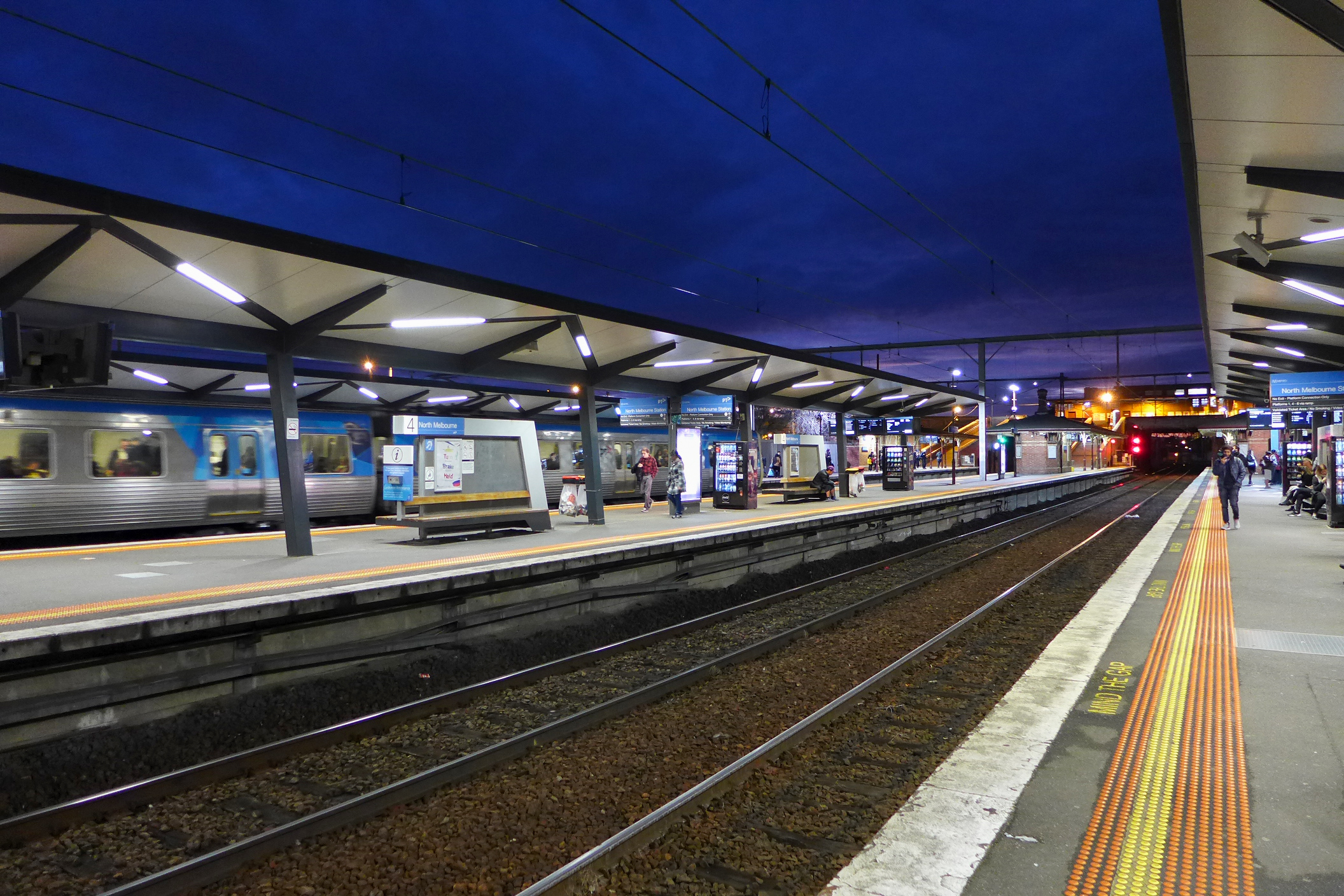
Northbound view from Platform 3, August 2017
