= Williamstown railway station =

Railway station in Melbourne, Australia

Williamstown
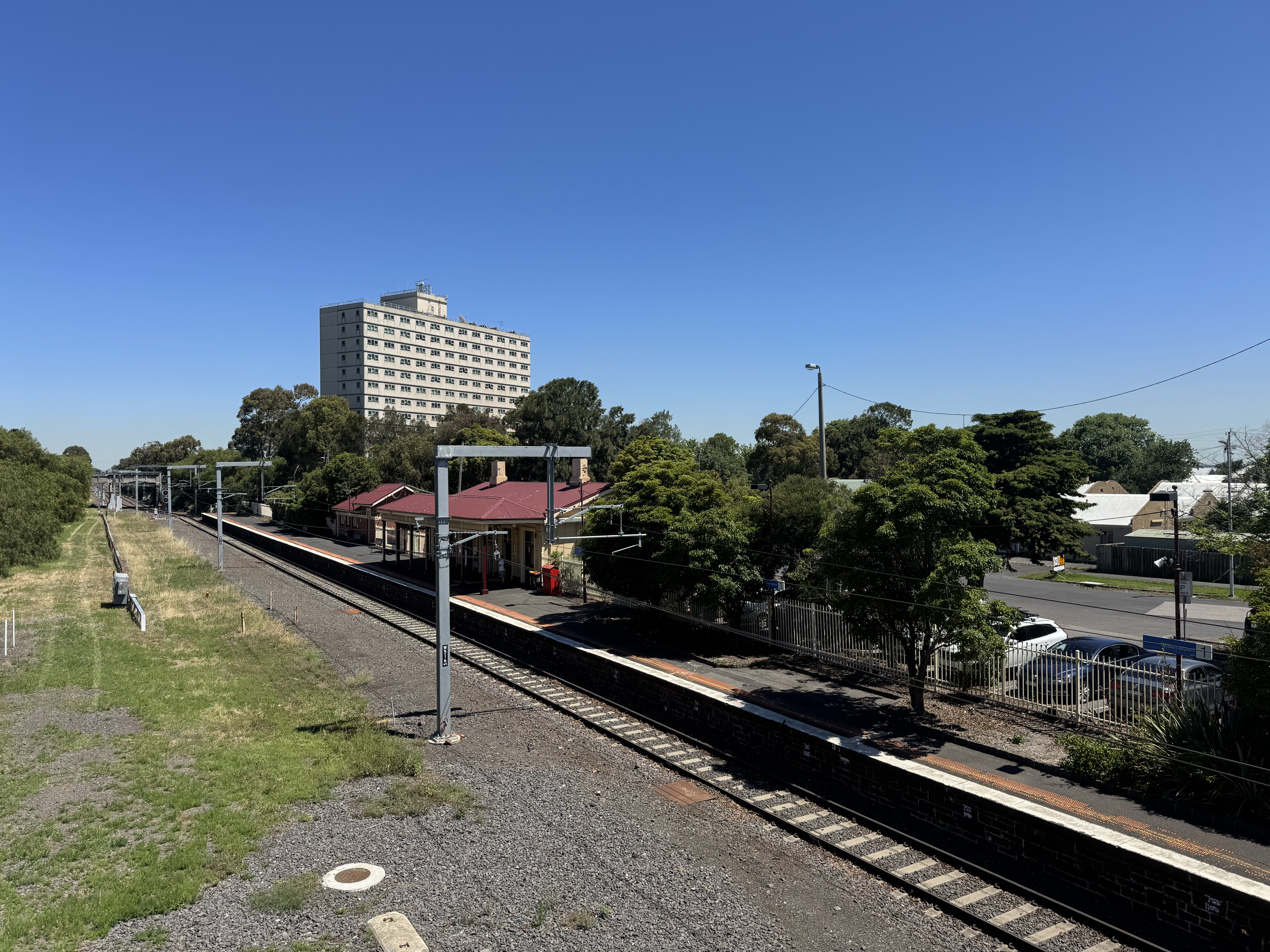
- Northbound view of the station platform viewed from the southern pedestrian footbridge, December 2024

General information
- Location: Hanmer Street, Williamstown, Victoria 3016; City of Hobsons Bay; Australia
- Coordinates: 37°52′04″S 144°54′19″E
- System: PTV commuter rail station
- Owner: VicTrack
- Operator: Metro Trains
- Line: Williamstown
- Distance: 14.20 kilometres from Southern Cross
- Platforms: 1
- Tracks: 1
- Connections: Bus

Construction
- Structure type: Ground
- Parking: Yes
- Cycle facilities: Yes
- Accessible: Yes—step free access

Other information
- Status: Operational, premium station
- Station code: WIL
- Fare zone: Myki zone 1
- Website: Public Transport Victoria

History
- Opened: 17 January 1859; 167 years ago
- Electrified: 1500 V DC overhead (August 1920)

Passengers
- 2005–2006: 108,142
- 2006–2007: 124,239 ▲14.88%
- 2007–2008: 129,762 ▲4.44%
- 2008–2009: 244,128 ▲88.13%
- 2009–2010: 246,207 ▲0.85%
- 2010–2011: 231,888 ▼5.81%
- 2011–2012: 223,411 ▼3.65%
- 2012–2013: Not measured
- 2013–2014: 163,532 ▼26.8%
- 2014–2015: 157,057 ▼3.96%
- 2015–2016: 159,531 ▲1.57%
- 2016–2017: 153,809 ▼3.58%
- 2017–2018: 165,314 ▲7.48%
- 2018–2019: 202,950 ▲22.76%
- 2019–2020: 162,050 ▼20.15%
- 2020–2021: 78,150 ▼51.77%
- 2021–2022: 60,150 ▼23.03%

Services
| Preceding station | Metro Trains | Following station |
|---|---|---|
| Williamstown Beach towards Sandringham via Flinders Street | Williamstown line | Terminus |
| Williamstown Beach towards Newport | Williamstown line Shuttle services | Terminus |
Former services
| Preceding station | MetRail | Following station |
|---|---|---|
| Williamstown Beach towards Flinders Street | Williamstown line | Williamstown Pier Terminus |
Track layout
Location

Williamstown station is a railway station operated by Metro Trains Melbourne and the terminus of the Williamstown line, part of the Melbourne rail network. It serves the western suburb of Williamstown, in Melbourne, Victoria, Australia. Williamstown station is a ground level premium station, featuring one side platform. It opened on 17 January 1859.

The station building is listed on the Victorian Heritage Register, and is the second oldest railway station in Victoria, after St Kilda. It is also the oldest timber railway station building to survive in the state, and one of the earliest surviving timber public buildings in Victoria.

At the up end of the station platform, the double track railway converges into single track.

== History ==
Work on the line started under the Melbourne, Mount Alexander and Murray River Railway Company, but were taken over by the government in 1856, after work faltered. Builders Kerr, Hodgson & Billings commenced work on the timber station building in 1858, with the station opening to traffic on 17 January 1859. Arched bluestone road bridges were built over the cutting at Thompson and Cole Streets. Until 1987, the line continued around the bend to the now closed and demolished Williamstown Pier.

The central section of the station building remains today, but was originally flanked by two pavilions: one for the stationmasters residence, and the other pavilion was refreshment rooms. A now removed timber and iron verandah lined the street side of the station, while on the rail side, the original platform canopy extended along the platform much further.

The Ann Street footbridge was installed around 1883, and on electrification in 1916, the Thompson Street overpass arch was removed and replaced with girder spans, to provide increased clearance.

Railway sidings, a signal box and weighbridge were once located opposite the station, but have been since removed, with a portion of the goods yard out of use by 1965. By June 1988, the majority of the sidings were removed. By October of that year, all rails, sleepers, overhead wires and signals between Williamstown and Williamstown Pier were removed, along with a further two electrified sidings, next to the platform track. The track now currently ends just under the Ann Street footbridge, at the down end of the station.

On 18 June 1996, Williamstown was upgraded to a premium station.

During the 2013/2014 financial year, it was the 13th least used station on Melbourne's metropolitan network, with 164,000 passenger movements.

== Platforms and services ==
Williamstown has one platform. It is serviced by Metro Trains' Williamstown line services.

=== Current ===
Williamstown platform arrangement
| Platform | Line | Destination | Via | Service Type | Notes | Source |
|---|---|---|---|---|---|---|
| 1 | Williamstown line | Newport | | All stations | Shuttle service, operates during late nights + weekend mornings. | |
| 1 | Williamstown line | Flinders Street or Sandringham | Flinders Street | All stations | Services only continue to Sandringham on weekdays. | |

== Transport links ==
Transit Systems Victoria operates one route via Williamstown station, under contract to Public Transport Victoria:

- 471 : Williamstown – Sunshine station

== Gallery ==
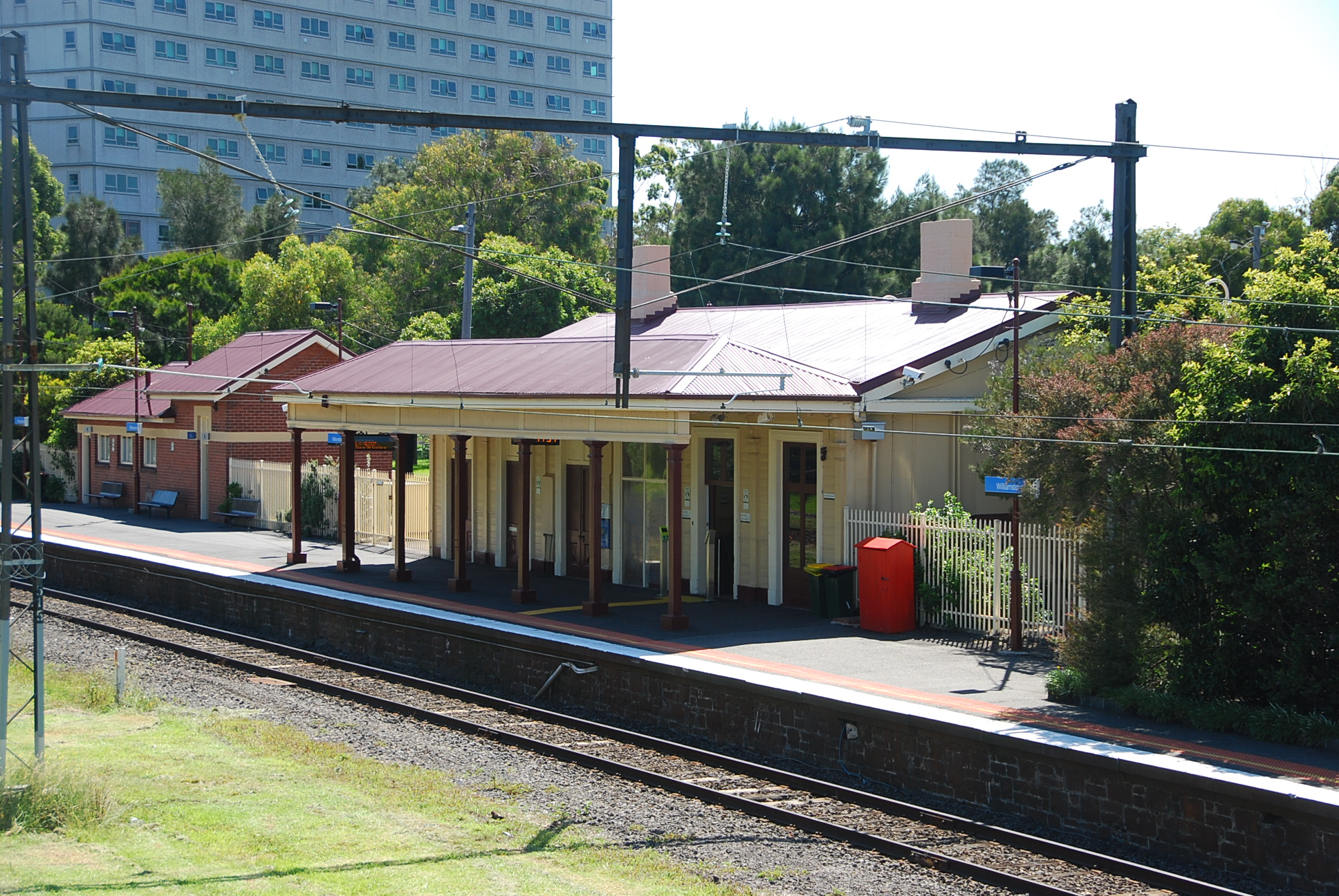
Northbound view of the station platform and building, March 2011

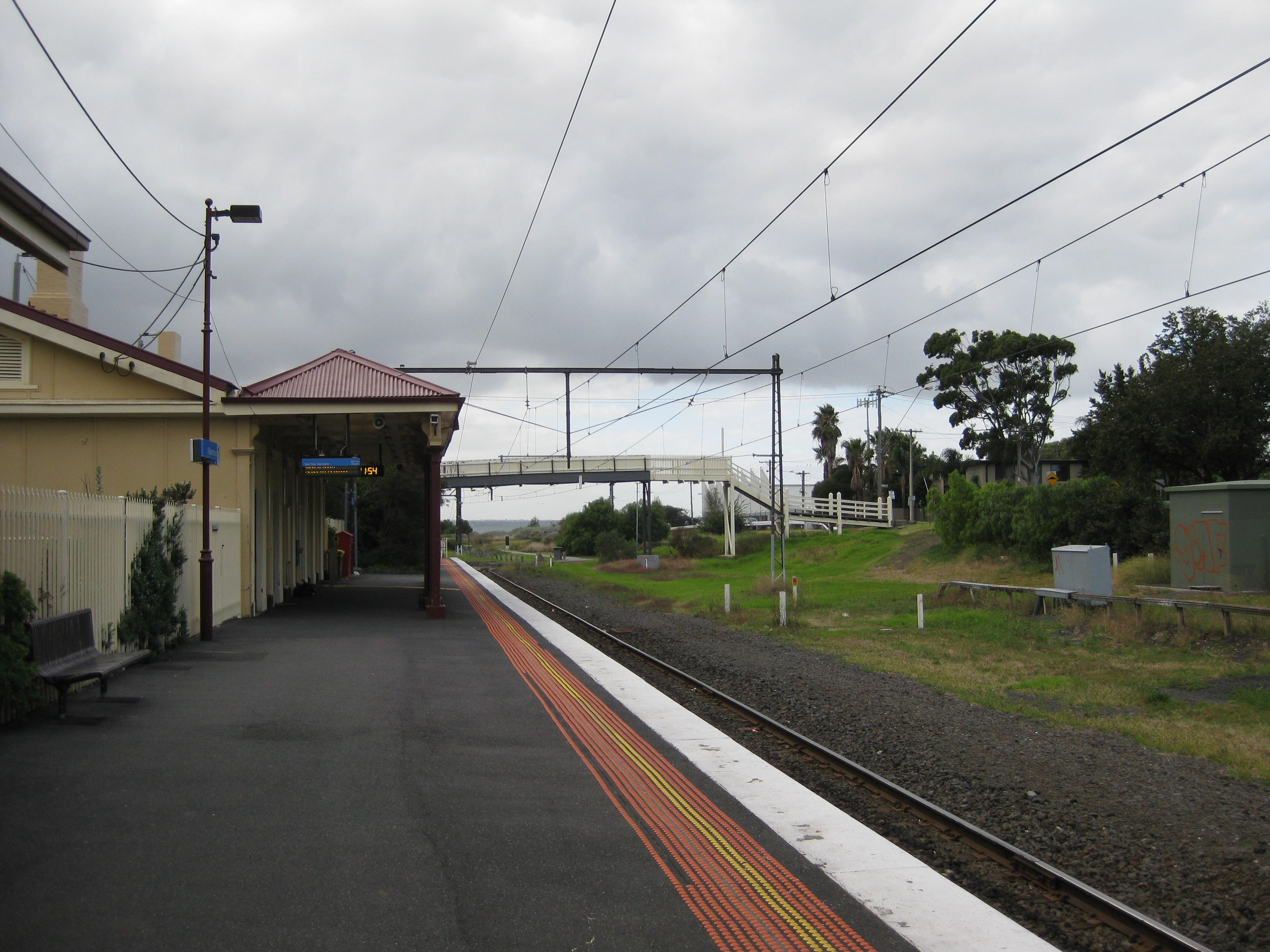
Southbound view from platform looking at station building and pedestrian bridge, April 2011

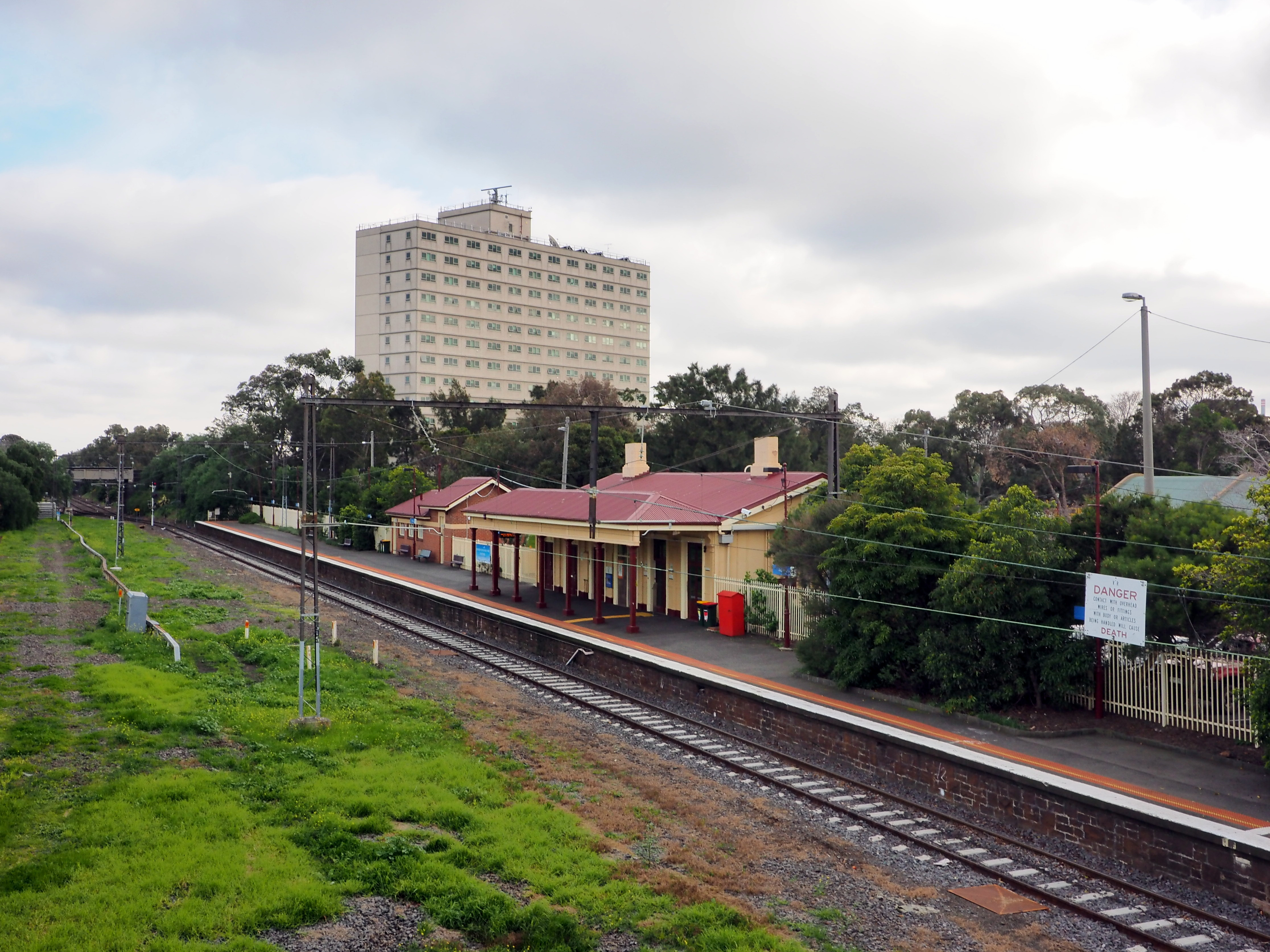
Northbound view of platform and station building viewed from pedestrian bridge, June 2014

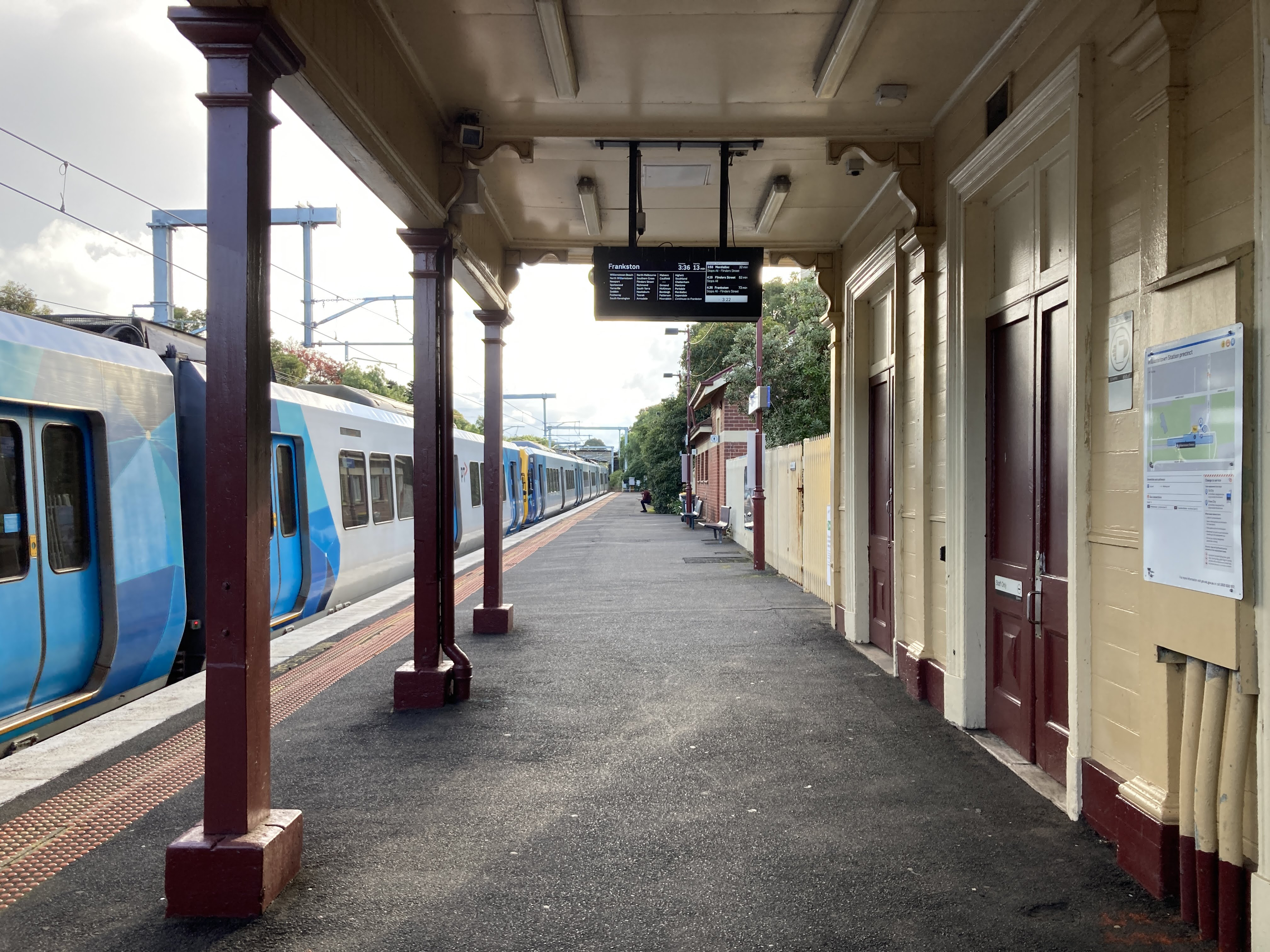
Northbound view from the station platform, with an X'Trapolis train idle at the station platform, May 2023

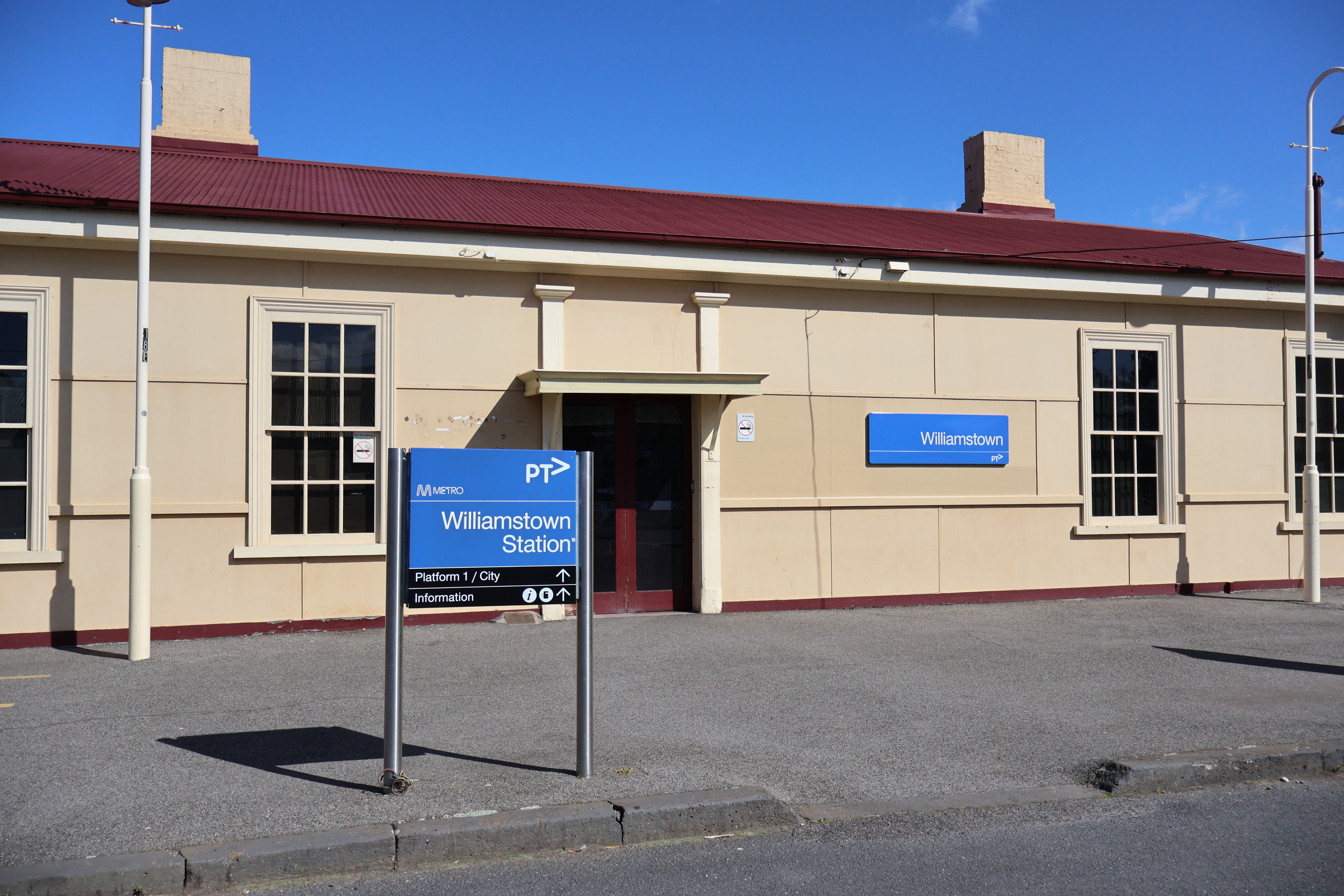
Williamstown Station building from the outside, August 2024

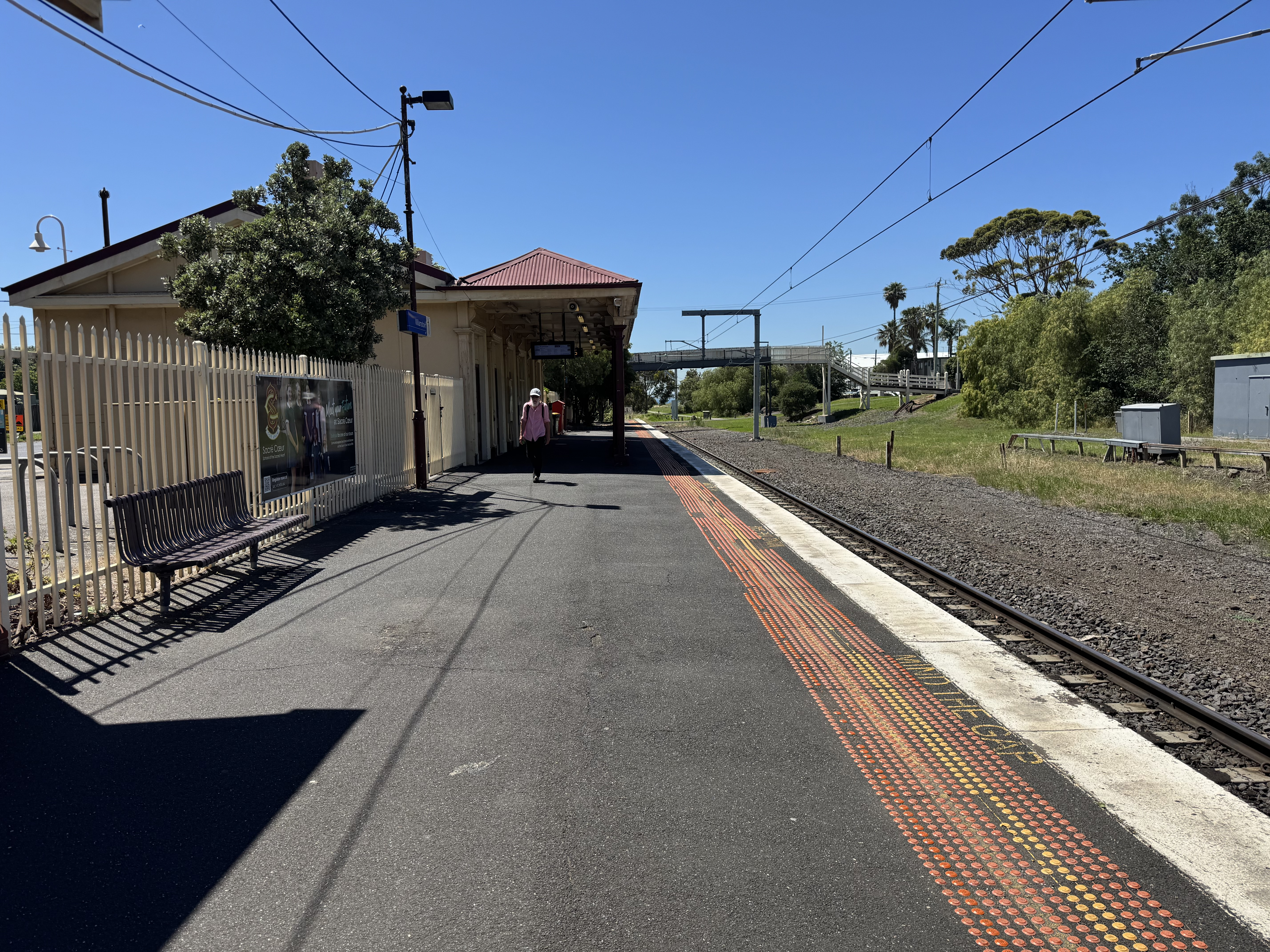
Southbound view from the station platform, December 2024

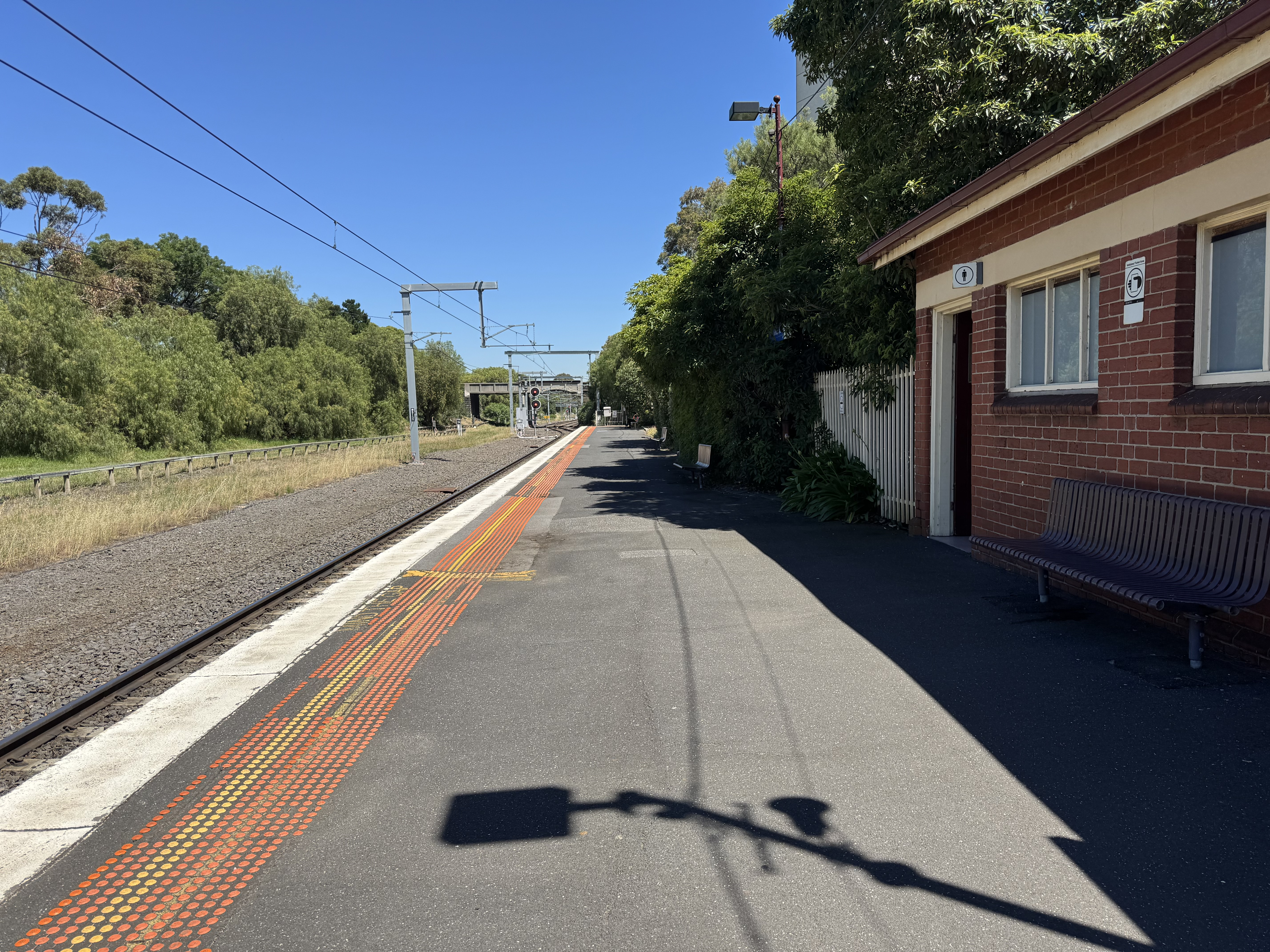
Northbound view from the station platform, December 2024

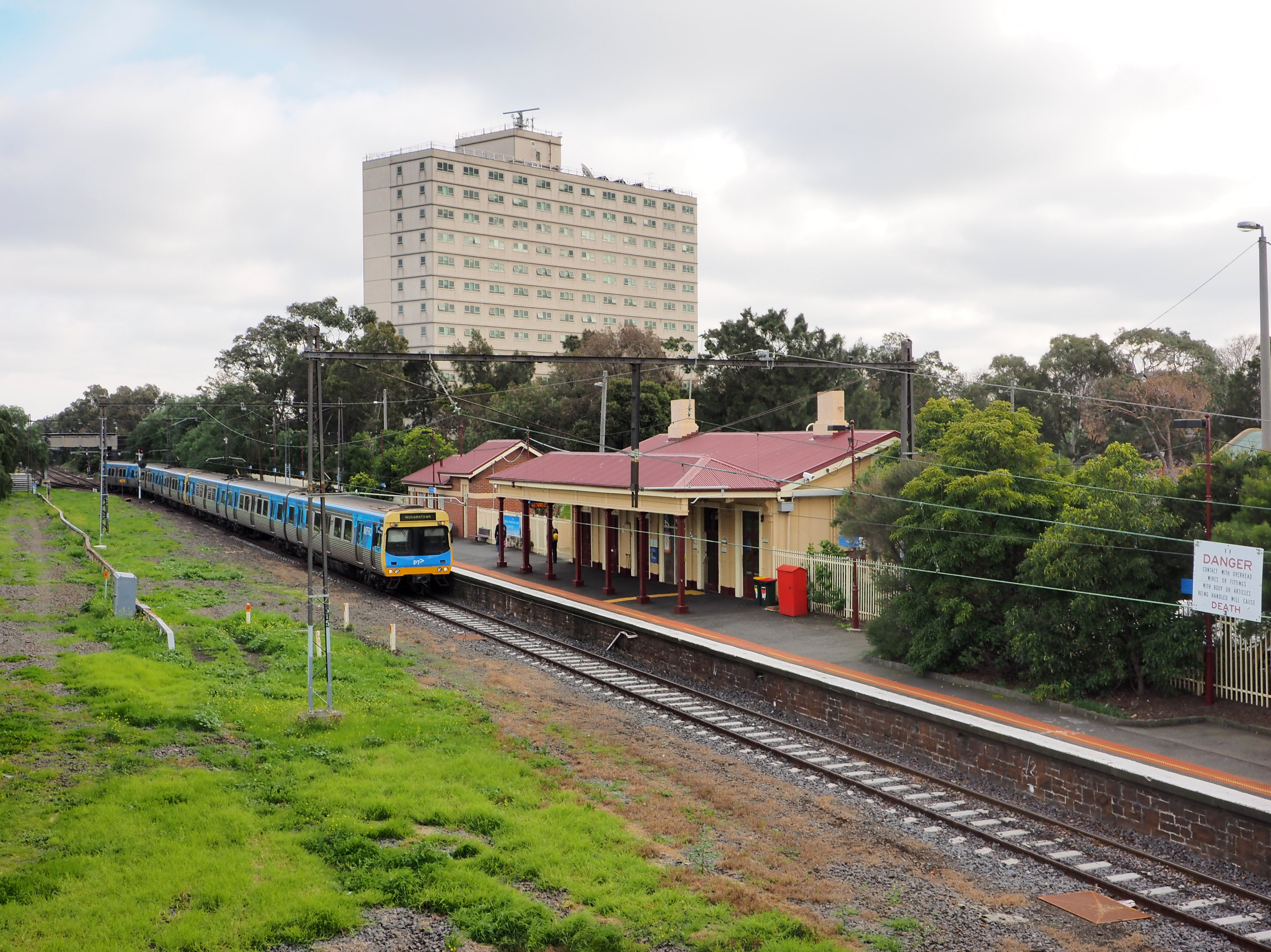
Comeng train arriving, June 2014

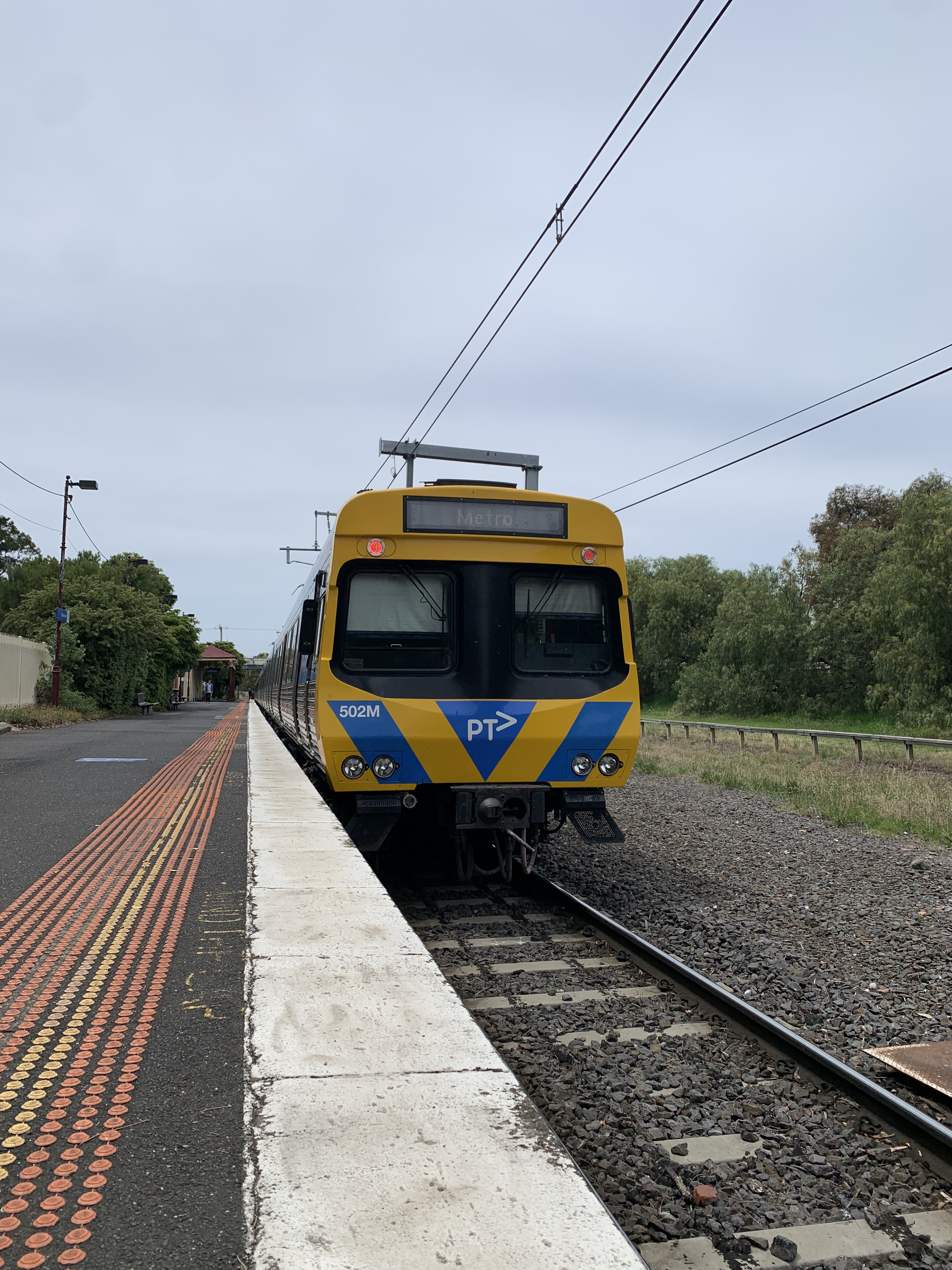
Comeng train, December 2024

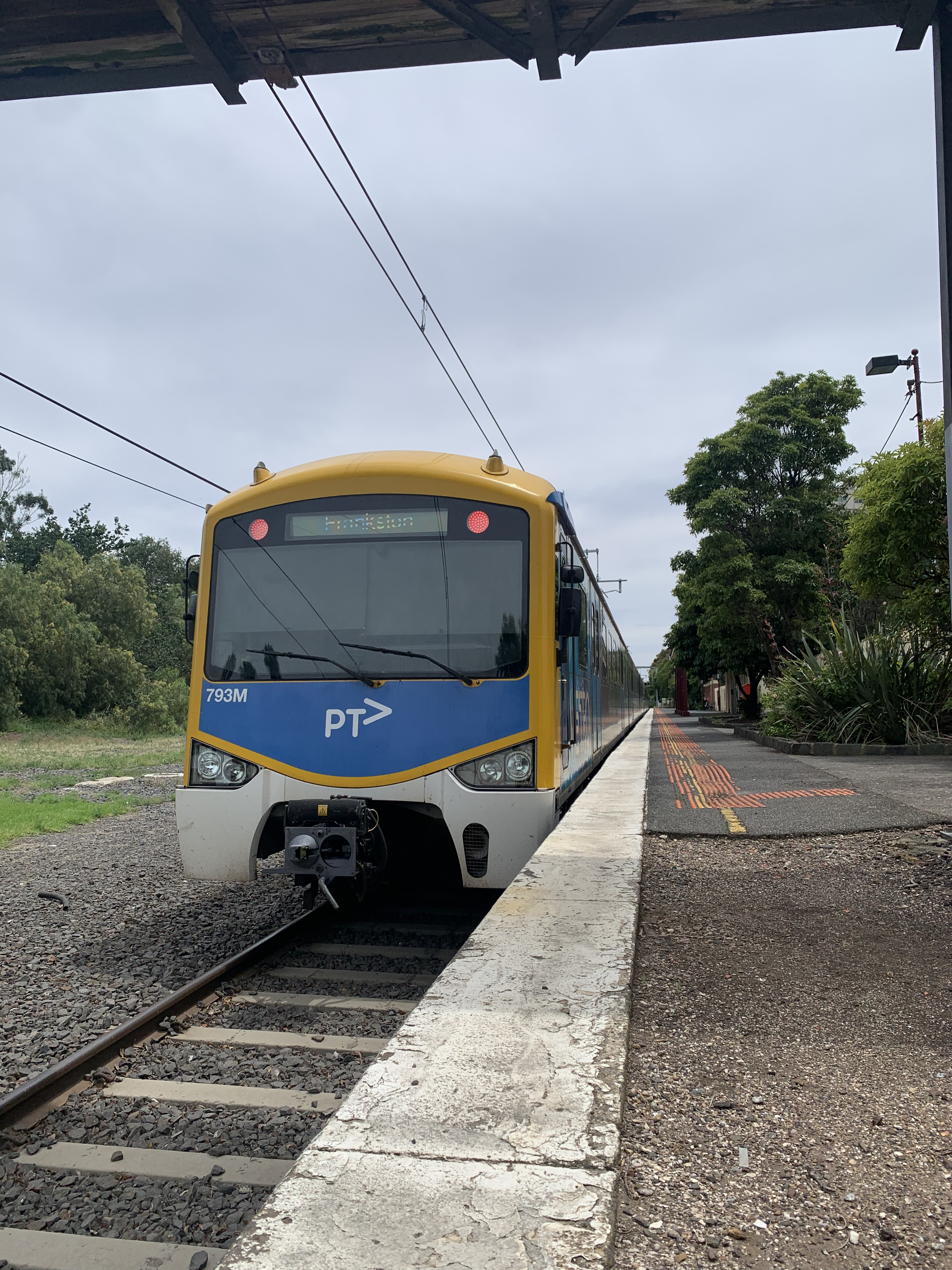
Siemens train, December 2024
