= Flemington Racecourse line =

Passenger rail service in metropolitan Melbourne, Victoria, Australia

Flemington Racecourse

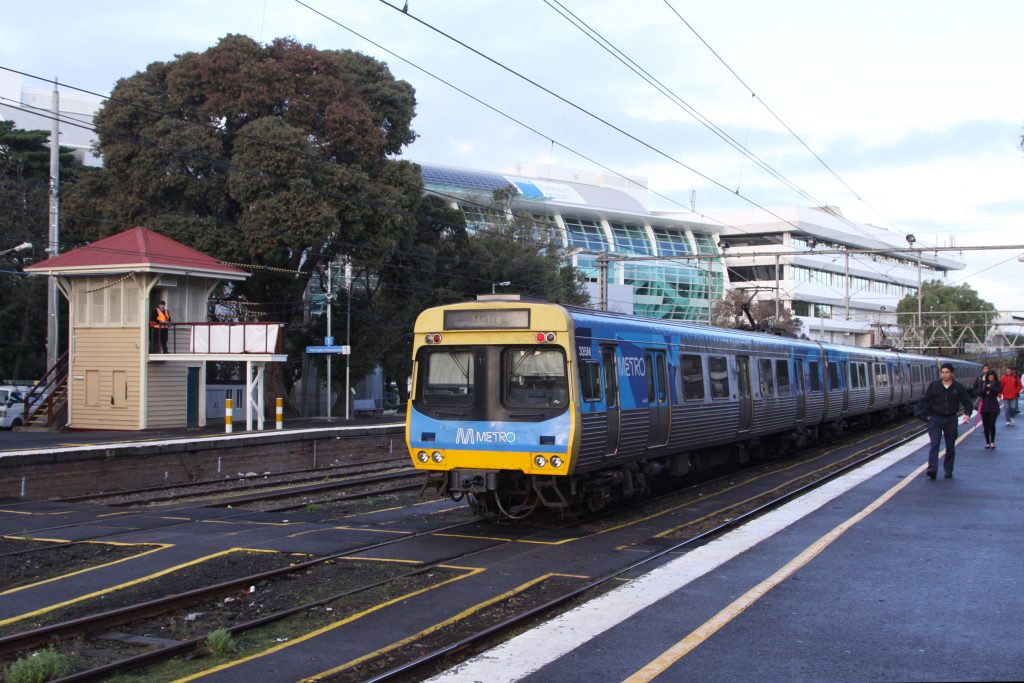
- Comeng stabled at Flemington Racecourse station

Overview
- Service type: Commuter rail
- System: Melbourne railway network
- Status: Operational; special events only
- Locale: Melbourne, Victoria, Australia
- First service: 28 February 1861; 165 years ago
- Current operator: Metro Trains
- Former operators: M&ER (1861–1864); Victorian Railways (VR) (1867–1974); VR as VicRail (1974–1983); MTA (The Met) (1983–1989); PTC (The Met) (1989–1998); Hillside Trains (1998–2000); Connex Melbourne (2000–2009)

Route
- Termini: Flinders Street; Flemington Racecourse
- Stops: 5
- Distance travelled: 7.8 km (4.8 mi)
- Average journey time: ~17 minutes
- Service frequency: 4–60 minutes during special events
- Lines used: Flemington Racecourse, Albury (Craigieburn)

Technical
- Rolling stock: Comeng, Siemens, X'Trapolis 100
- Track gauge: 1,600 mm (5 ft 3 in)
- Electrification: 1500 V DC overhead
- Track owner: VicTrack

The Flemington Racecourse line is a commuter railway line in the city of Melbourne, Victoria, Australia. Operated by Metro Trains Melbourne, it is the city's shortest metropolitan railway line at 7.8 kilometres (4.8 mi). The line runs from Flinders Street station in central Melbourne to Flemington Racecourse station, situated next to the racecourse in the city's north west, serving a total of 5 stations. The line operates only during special events, with services as frequent as every 4 minutes during peak periods of those special events. Trains on the Flemington Racecourse line run with two three-car formations of Comeng, Siemens Nexas, or X'Trapolis 100 trainsets.

The Flemington Racecourse line originated in 1861 as a branch of the Melbourne and Essendon Railway Company, designed to link the Melbourne rail network with Flemington Racecourse. The racecourse, established in 1840, gained its railway connection in 1861 but closed in 1864 due to financial issues. The Victorian Railways took over and reopened the line in 1867. Notably, the line was electrified in 1918, making it Melbourne's first electrified route. Automatic signalling was introduced in 1919, though the connection between points and signals ceased in the 1980s or 1990s with the closure of sidings.

Since the 2010s, only minor upgrades have taken place, including upgrades of signalling, the replacement of sleepers, and station accessibility upgrades.

== History ==
=== 19th century ===
The Flemington Racecourse line opened as a branch from Newmarket by the Melbourne and Essendon Railway Company in February 1861. The line was constructed to connect the Melbourne rail network with Flemington Racecourse, the main horse racing facility in Melbourne. The racecourse was originally opened in 1840 and received its rail connection 21 years later in 1861. Three years later, in July 1864, the line was closed after the company faced financial difficulties. The line was taken over by the Victorian Railways and reopened in November 1867.

=== 20th century ===
The line was electrified in 1918 for the testing of electric trains, and therefore became the first electrified line in Melbourne. The first electric train ran a test trip from Newmarket to Flemington Racecourse station on 6 October 1918.

Automatic signalling, using two-position signals, was provided in September 1919. When passenger services were operated on the line, the points were connected to the signal boxes and the signals were brought into use. This arrangement finished in the 1980s or 1990s when the sidings were closed.

=== 21st century ===
During the 2017 Melbourne Cup, a group of activists drove onto and blocked the rail tracks in an effort to protest refugee detention centres on Manus Island. The disruption caused major delays on the line during its busiest period of the year, forcing racegoers to exit the train with assistance from emergency services and walk along the tracks to access the racecourse.

== Network and operations ==
=== Services ===
Services on the Flemington Racecourse line operate only during special events, including during the Melbourne Cup, Oaks Day, the Royal Melbourne Show, university exams (at Victoria University located nearby), or any other large events. In general, during special events, train frequency is 4–60 minutes depending on the size of the crowd and the flow of passengers. As the line only operates during special events, services do not run 24 hours a day on Friday nights and weekends.

Train services on the Flemington Racecourse line are also subjected to maintenance and renewal works, usually when the line isn't in use for special events. In the event that maintenance does need to occur during a special event, shuttle bus services are provided throughout the duration of works for affected commuters.

==== Stopping patterns ====
Services during minor events usually depart from Southern Cross, stopping at North Melbourne. During major events, services might run express direct from Flinders Street to the Showgrounds or Racecourse. Most services, especially for average-sized events, run from Flinders Street to the Showgrounds or Racecourse, stopping at Southern Cross and North Melbourne.

Legend — Station status

- ◼ Premium Station – Station staffed from first to last train
- ◻ Host Station – Usually staffed during morning peak, however this can vary for different stations on the network.

Legend — Stopping patterns
Services do not operate via the City Loop

- ● – All trains stop
- ◐ – Some services do not stop
- | – Trains pass and do not stop

Flemington Racecourse Services
| Station | Zone | Show special | Race special |
|---|---|---|---|
| ◼ Flinders Street | 1 | ◐ | ◐ |
| ◼ Southern Cross | 1 | ◐ | ◐ |
| ◼ North Melbourne | 1 | ◐ | ◐ |
| Showgrounds | 1 | ● | | |
| Flemington Racecourse | 1 | | ● |

=== Operators ===
The Flemington Racecourse line has had a total of 7 operators since its opening in 1861. The majority of operations throughout its history have been government run: from the acquisition of the service from private operator Melbourne and Essendon Railway Company in 1867 until the 1998 privatisation of Melbourne's rail network, four different government operators have run the line. These operators, Victorian Railways, the Metropolitan Transit Authority, the Public Transport Corporation, and Hillside Trains have a combined operational length of 133 years. Hillside Trains was privatised in 1999 and later rebranded Connex Melbourne. Metro Trains Melbourne, the current private operator, then took over the operations in 2009. Both private operators have had a combined operational period of 29 years.

Past and present operators of the Flemington Racecourse line:
| Operator | Assumed operations | Ceased operations | Length of operations |
|---|---|---|---|
| Melbourne and Essendon Railway Company | 1861 | 1864 | 3 years |
| Victorian Railways | 1867 | 1983 | 116 years |
| Metropolitan Transit Authority | 1983 | 1989 | 6 years |
| Public Transport Corporation | 1989 | 1998 | 9 years |
| Hillside Trains (government operator) | 1998 | 2000 | 2 years |
| Connex Melbourne | 2000 | 2009 | 9 years |
| Metro Trains Melbourne | 2009 | incumbent | 16 years (ongoing) |

=== Route ===
Interactive map of Flemington Racecourse line in northern Melbourne.

Flemington Racecourse (physical track)

Overview
- Status: Operational with passenger services from Flinders Street to Flemington Racecourse
- Owner: M&ER (1860–1864); Victorian Railways (VR) (1867–1974); VR as VicRail (1974–1983); MTA (The Met) (1983–1989); PTC (The Met) (1989–1997); VicTrack (1997–Current)
- Locale: Melbourne, Victoria, Australia
- Termini: Flinders Street; Flemington Racecourse
- Connecting lines: All metropolitan, regional, and interstate
- Stations: 5 current stations; 2 former sidings

Service
- Services: Flemington Racecourse

History
- Work began: 28 February 1861
- Opened: Southern Cross to Newmarket on 21 October 1860; Newmarket to Flemington Racecourse on 28 February 1861; Flinders Street to Southern Cross on 29 November 1891
- Completed: 28 February 1861
- Reopened: North Melbourne to Flemington Racecourse on 31 October 1867
- Electrified: Testing – Newmarket to Flemington Racecourse on 6 October 1918; Service – Flinders Street to Flemington Racecourse on 28 May 1919
- Closed: North Melbourne to Flemington Racecourse on 1 July 1864

Technical
- Line length: 8.092 km (5.03 mi)
- Num of tracks: Six tracks: Flinders Street to North Melbourne; Four tracks: North Melbourne to Kensington; Triple track: Showgrounds to Flemington Racecourse; Double track: Kensington to Showgrounds
- Track gauge: 1,600 mm (5 ft 3 in)
- Electrification: 1500 V DC overhead
- Operating speed: 65 km/h (40 mph) – Electric
- Signalling: Automatic block signalling
- Maximum incline: 1 in 50 (2%)

The Flemington Racecourse line forms a mostly linear route from the Melbourne central business district to its terminus at Flemington Racecourse. The route is 7.8 kilometres (4.8 mi) long and is fully double tracked. Exiting the city, the line only has minor earthworks, with some sections of the line being elevated or lowered into a cutting to eliminate level crossings. Despite some removals, there are a number of level crossings still present with no current plans to remove them.

The line follows the same alignment as multiple other lines, with the Flemington Racecourse line splitting off at North Melbourne. The Flemington Racecourse line continues on its western alignment, whereas the other lines continue onto a northern, western, or south-western alignment. Most of the rail line goes through built-up suburbs and event facilities.

=== Stations ===
The line serves 5 stations across 7.8 kilometres (4.8 mi) of track. All of the stations are of ground level designs.

| Station | Accessibility | Opened | Terrain | Train connections | Other connections |
|---|---|---|---|---|---|
| Flinders Street | Yes—step free access | 1854 | Ground level | 13 connections: * Alamein line; Belgrave line; Craigieburn line; Frankston line; Gippsland line; Glen Waverley line; Hurstbridge line; Lilydale line; Mernda line; Sandringham line; Upfield line; Werribee line; Williamstown line | Trams Buses |
| Southern Cross | Yes—step free access | 1859 | Ground level | 25 connections: * Alamein line; Albury line; Ararat line; Ballarat line; Belgrave line; Bendigo line; Craigieburn line; Echuca line; Frankston line; Geelong line; Gippsland line; Glen Waverley line; Hurstbridge line; Lilydale line; Maryborough line; Mernda line; NSW TrainLink Southern; Seymour line; Shepparton line; Swan Hill line; The Overland; Upfield line; Warrnambool line; Werribee line; Williamstown line | Trams Buses Coaches SkyBus |
| North Melbourne | Yes—step free access | 1859 | Ground level | 6 connections: * Craigieburn line; Seymour line; Shepparton line; Upfield line; Werribee line; Williamstown line | Buses |
| Showgrounds | No—steep ramp | 1883 | Ground level | | |
| Flemington Racecourse | No—steep ramp | 1861 | Ground level | | |

Station histories
| Station | Opened | Closed | Age | Notes |
|---|---|---|---|---|
| Flinders Street | 12 September 1854 | | 172 years | Formerly Melbourne Terminus |
| Southern Cross | 17 January 1859 | | 167 years | Formerly Batman's Hill; Formerly Spencer Street |
| North Melbourne | 6 October 1859 | | 167 years | |
| Kensington | 1 November 1860 | 1 July 1864 | 3 years | Melbourne and Essendon Railway Company |
| Kensington | 9 October 1871 | | 155 years | Not a stop since 2013 due to a timetable reshuffle |
| Newmarket | 1 November 1860 | 1 July 1864 | 3 years | Melbourne and Essendon Railway Company |
| Newmarket | 9 October 1871 | | 155 years | Not a stop |
| Showgrounds | 7 November 1883 | | 143 years | |
| Flemington Racecourse | 28 February 1861 | 1 July 1864 | 3 years | Melbourne and Essendon Railway Company |
| Flemington Racecourse | 31 October 1867 | | 159 years | |

== Infrastructure ==
=== Rolling stock ===
The Flemington Racecourse line uses three different types of electric multiple unit (EMU) trains that are operated in a split six-car configuration, with three doors per side on each carriage. The primary rolling stock featured on the line is the Comeng EMUs, built by Commonwealth Engineering between 1981 and 1988. Siemens Nexas EMUs are also widely featured on the line, originally built between 2002 and 2005. These train sets feature more modern technology than the Comeng trains. The final type of rolling stock featured on the line is the X'Trapolis 100 built by Alstom between 2002 and 2004, and 2009 and 2020. All of these rolling stock models are widely used on other lines across the metropolitan network and work as the backbone of the network.

Alongside the passenger trains, Flemington Racecourse line tracks and equipment are maintained by a fleet of engineering trains. The four types of engineering trains are:

- The shunting train; designed for moving trains along non-electrified corridors and for transporting other maintenance locomotives
- For track evaluation; designed for evaluating track and its condition
- The overhead inspection train; designed for overhead wiring inspection
- The infrastructure evaluation carriage; designed for general infrastructure evaluation.

Most of these trains are repurposed locomotives previously used by V/Line, Metro Trains, and the Southern Shorthaul Railroad.

==== Planned rolling stock ====
From the middle of 2020s, the next generation of the X'Trapolis family of electric EMUs—the X'Trapolis 2.0—will be introduced. This new model will fully replace the existing fleet of Comeng EMUs operating on the line currently with new, modern, and technologically advanced trains. The new trains will include features designed to increase passenger comfort like quicker doors, allowing for reduced boarding times, passenger information systems to display relevant information about the train and its journey, designated bicycle storage areas, and 6 cars that are fully walk through. For reliability, the trains have a higher energy efficiency to work with a lower network voltage. Finally, accessibility is improved through new interior designs featuring fold-up seating to allow additional space for wheelchair users and passenger operated automatic wheelchair ramps (located behind the two driver cabs).

=== Accessibility ===
In compliance with the Disability Discrimination Act of 1992, all stations that are new-built or rebuilt are fully accessible and comply with legal guidelines. Three of the five stations on the corridor are fully accessible, but the others have not been upgraded to meet these guidelines. These stations feature ramps with gradients greater than 1 in 14, the maximum slope for stations lacking at-grade paths or lifts. Fully accessible stations typically also feature tactile boarding indicators, independent boarding ramps, wheelchair accessible Myki barriers, hearing loops, and widened paths.

=== Signalling ===
The Flemington Racecourse line uses three-position signalling, which is widely used across the Melbourne train network. Three-position signalling was first introduced in 1924, with the final section of the line converted to the new type of signalling 90 years later in 2014. The Flemington Racecourse line had Melbourne's last remaining example of two-position automatic signalling, apart from a section of the Hurstbridge line between Greensborough and Hurstbridge stations.
