= Showgrounds railway station, Melbourne =

Railway station in Melbourne, Australia

Showgrounds
- Westbound view from the platform, September 2026

General information
- Location: Epsom Road; Flemington, Victoria 3031; City of Melbourne; Australia
- Coordinates: 37°47′00″S 144°54′54″E
- System: PTV station
- Owner: VicTrack
- Operator: Metro Trains
- Line: Flemington Racecourse
- Distance: 5.73 kilometres from Southern Cross
- Platforms: 1 side
- Tracks: 2
- Connections: Tram

Construction
- Structure type: Ground
- Accessible: No—steep ramp

Other information
- Status: Special events only
- Station code: SGS
- Fare zone: Myki zone 1

History
- Opened: 7 November 1883; 142 years ago

Services
| Preceding station | Metro Trains | Following station |
|---|---|---|
| North Melbourne towards Southern Cross or Flinders Street | Flemington Racecourse line | Flemington Racecourse Terminus |
| North Melbourne towards Southern Cross or Flinders Street | Flemington Racecourse line | Terminus |
Track layout
Location

Showgrounds station is a railway station operated by Metro Trains Melbourne on the Flemington Racecourse line, part of the Melbourne rail network. The station opened on 7 November 1883 and is only used during special events at the Melbourne Showgrounds, such as the annual Royal Melbourne Show.

There are three signal boxes at Showgrounds, but the one included in a rostrum on the platform was decommissioned in 2014. There are several portable buildings providing staff amenities, and a wooden building for selling rail tickets. Also on the platform are turnstiles for entry to the Melbourne Showgrounds, and a Ticketek booking office for admission tickets to events.

== Platforms and services ==
Showgrounds has one platform. During special events, it is served by trains to Flinders Street, which stop at North Melbourne and Southern Cross.

Showgrounds platform arrangement
| Platform | Line | Destination | Service Type |
|---|---|---|---|
| 1 | Flemington Racecourse line | Southern Cross, Flinders Street | Limited express services |
| 1 | Flemington Racecourse line (Limited services) | Flemington Racecourse | All stations |

== Transport links ==
Yarra Trams runs one route via the station, serving the nearby Sandown Road tram stop on Epsom Road.

- : West Maribyrnong – Flinders Street station (via Elizabeth Street)
