= Flemington Racecourse railway station =

Railway station in Melbourne, Victoria, Australia

Flemington Racecourse
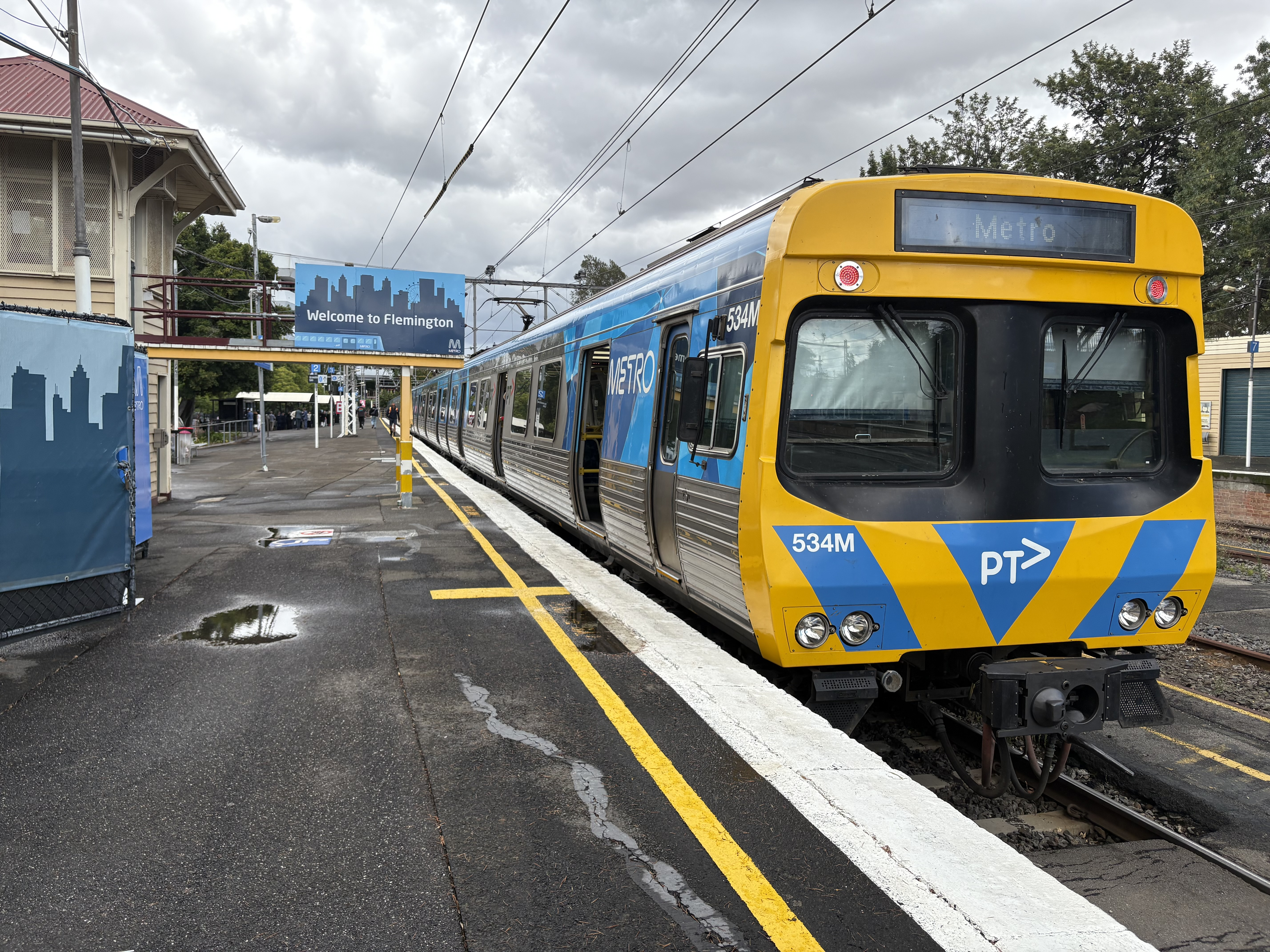
- Westbound view from Platform 1 with a Comeng train on that platform, February 2025

General information
- Location: Leonard Crescent; Flemington, Victoria 3031; City of Melbourne; Australia
- Coordinates: 37°47′16″S 144°54′24″E
- System: PTV Commuter rail station
- Owner: VicTrack
- Operator: Metro Trains
- Line: Flemington Racecourse
- Distance: 6.59 kilometres from Southern Cross
- Platforms: 2 side
- Tracks: 4
- Connections: Bus

Construction
- Structure type: Ground
- Accessible: No—steep ramp

Other information
- Status: Special events only
- Station code: RCE
- Fare zone: Myki zone 1
- Website: Public Transport Victoria

History
- Opened: 28 February 1861; 165 years ago

Services
Preceding station	Metro Trains	Following station
North Melbourne towards Southern Cross or Flinders Street	Flemington Racecourse line	Terminus
Showgrounds Limited services towards Southern Cross or Flinders Street	Flemington Racecourse line	Terminus
Track layout
Location

Flemington Racecourse station is a railway station operated by Metro Trains Melbourne and the terminus of the Flemington Racecourse line, part of the Melbourne rail network. It serves Flemington Racecourse and the suburb of Flemington, in Melbourne, Victoria, Australia. Flemington Racecourse station is a ground level unstaffed station, featuring two side platforms. It opened on 28 February 1861.

The station is only open on race days and during special events at Flemington Racecourse.

== Platforms and services ==
Flemington Racecourse has two side platforms. During special events, it is served by trains to Flinders Street calling at North Melbourne and Southern Cross. Two sidings between the platforms are used to stable trains.

During construction of the Regional Rail Link, the station was opened on occasions for diverted Sunbury line trains.

In 2018, when the Buckley Street level crossing was being removed at Essendon, Racecourse station was used for passengers on the Craigieburn line.

Flemington Racecourse platform arrangement
Platform	Line	Destination	Service Type
1	Flemington Racecourse line	Southern Cross, Flinders Street	Limited express services
2	Flemington Racecourse line	Southern Cross, Flinders Street	Limited express services

== Transport links ==
Transit Systems Victoria operates one bus route near Flemington Racecourse station, under contract to Public Transport Victoria:

- 472 : Williamstown – Moonee Ponds
