= South Kensington railway station =

Railway station in Melbourne, Australia

South Kensington
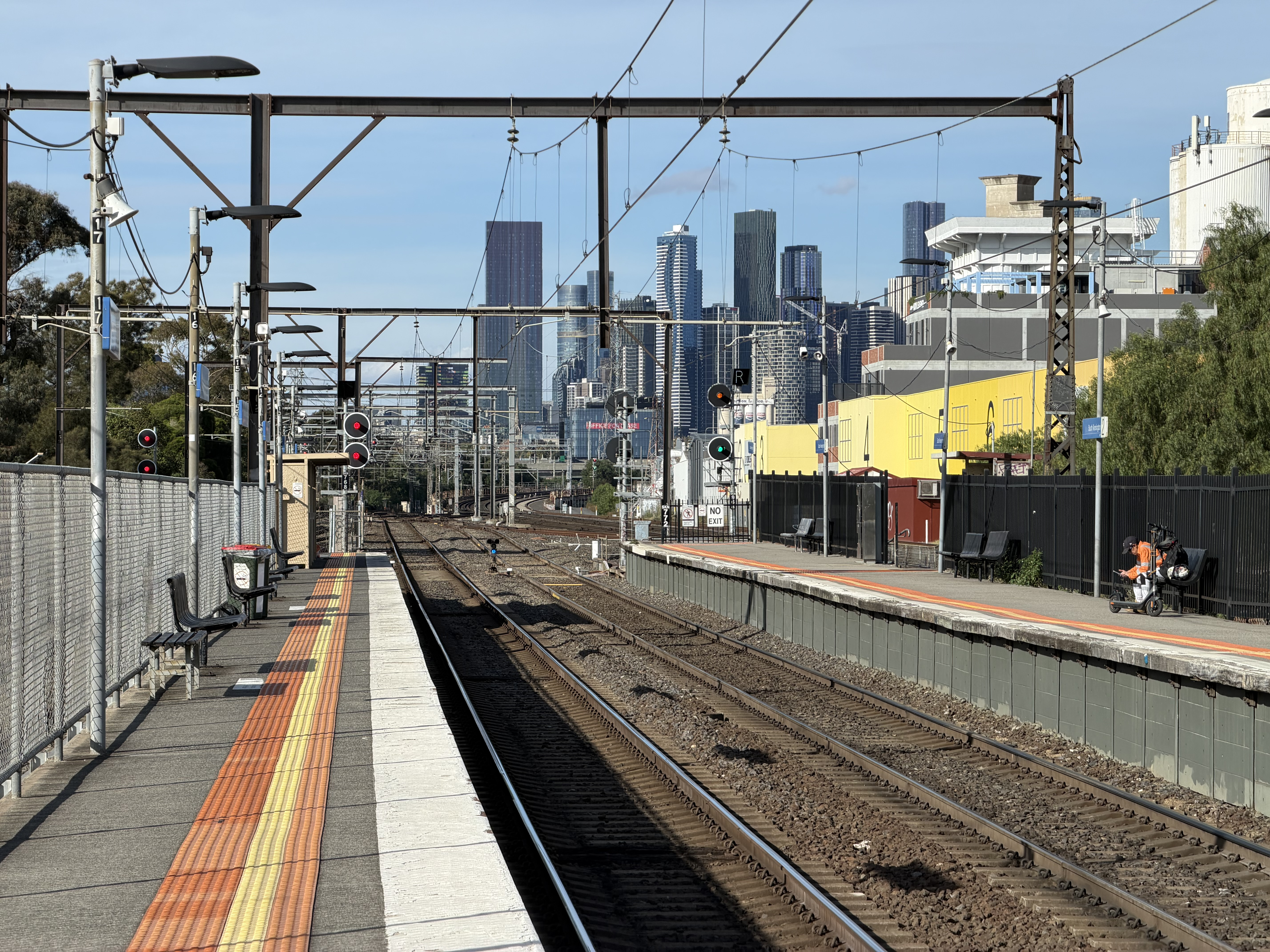
- Eastbound view from Platform 1, May 2026

General information
- Location: Childers Street, Kensington, Victoria 3031; City of Melbourne; Australia
- Coordinates: 37°47′59″S 144°55′33″E
- System: PTV commuter rail station
- Owner: VicTrack
- Operator: Metro Trains
- Lines: Werribee; Williamstown
- Distance: 3.49 kilometres from Southern Cross
- Platforms: 2 side
- Tracks: 6
- Connections: Bus

Construction
- Structure type: Ground
- Parking: Yes
- Accessible: Yes—step free access

Other information
- Status: Operational, unstaffed
- Station code: SKN
- Fare zone: Myki zone 1
- Website: Public Transport Victoria

History
- Opened: 11 March 1891; 135 years ago
- Rebuilt: 1975
- Electrified: August 1920 (1500 V DC overhead)

Passengers
- 2005–2006: 89,182
- 2006–2007: 120,945 ▲35.61%
- 2007–2008: 142,531 ▲17.84%
- 2008–2009: 207,901 ▲45.86%
- 2009–2010: 249,613 ▲20.06%
- 2010–2011: 281,410 ▲12.73%
- 2011–2012: 284,298 ▲1.02%
- 2012–2013: Not measured
- 2013–2014: 338,162 ▲18.94%
- 2014–2015: 342,741 ▲1.35%
- 2015–2016: 394,707 ▲15.16%
- 2016–2017: 398,191 ▲0.88%
- 2017–2018: 406,011 ▲1.96%
- 2018–2019: 412,850 ▲1.68%
- 2019–2020: 304,750 ▼26.18%
- 2020–2021: 127,950 ▼58.01%
- 2021–2022: 159,950 ▲25.01%

Services
Preceding station	Metro Trains	Following station
North Melbourne towards Sandringham via Flinders Street	Werribee line	Footscray towards Laverton, Werribee or Williamstown
North Melbourne towards Sandringham via Flinders Street	Williamstown line	Footscray towards Laverton, Werribee or Williamstown
Former services
Preceding station	Metro Trains	Following station
North Melbourne towards Flinders Street	Sunbury line	Footscray towards Sunbury
Track layout
Location

South Kensington station is a railway station operated by Metro Trains Melbourne on the Werribee and Williamstown lines, both part of the Melbourne rail network. It serves the inner north-western suburb of Kensington in Melbourne, Victoria, Australia. It opened on 11 March 1891, with the current station being provided in 1975.

Freight lines run to the south of the station. The closest of those lines are used by V/Line to reverse empty services from Traralgon and Bairnsdale, while the tracks further south are used by a variety of standard gauge freight operators. The lines to the east join Melbourne Yard, while those to the west are the South Kensington–West Footscray set of lines that lead to either South Dynon or West Footscray, via the Bunbury Street tunnel.

There used to be a number of private sidings around South Kensington, which have all been closed. They included a siding to a large wool store to the north-east, now demolished, one to a warehouse and silos to the east (the silos are open but are no longer served by rail). There were two sidings to the north. One served the Melbourne City Council abattoirs, and the other was constructed during World War II, to serve a military warehouse complex called Kenstore.

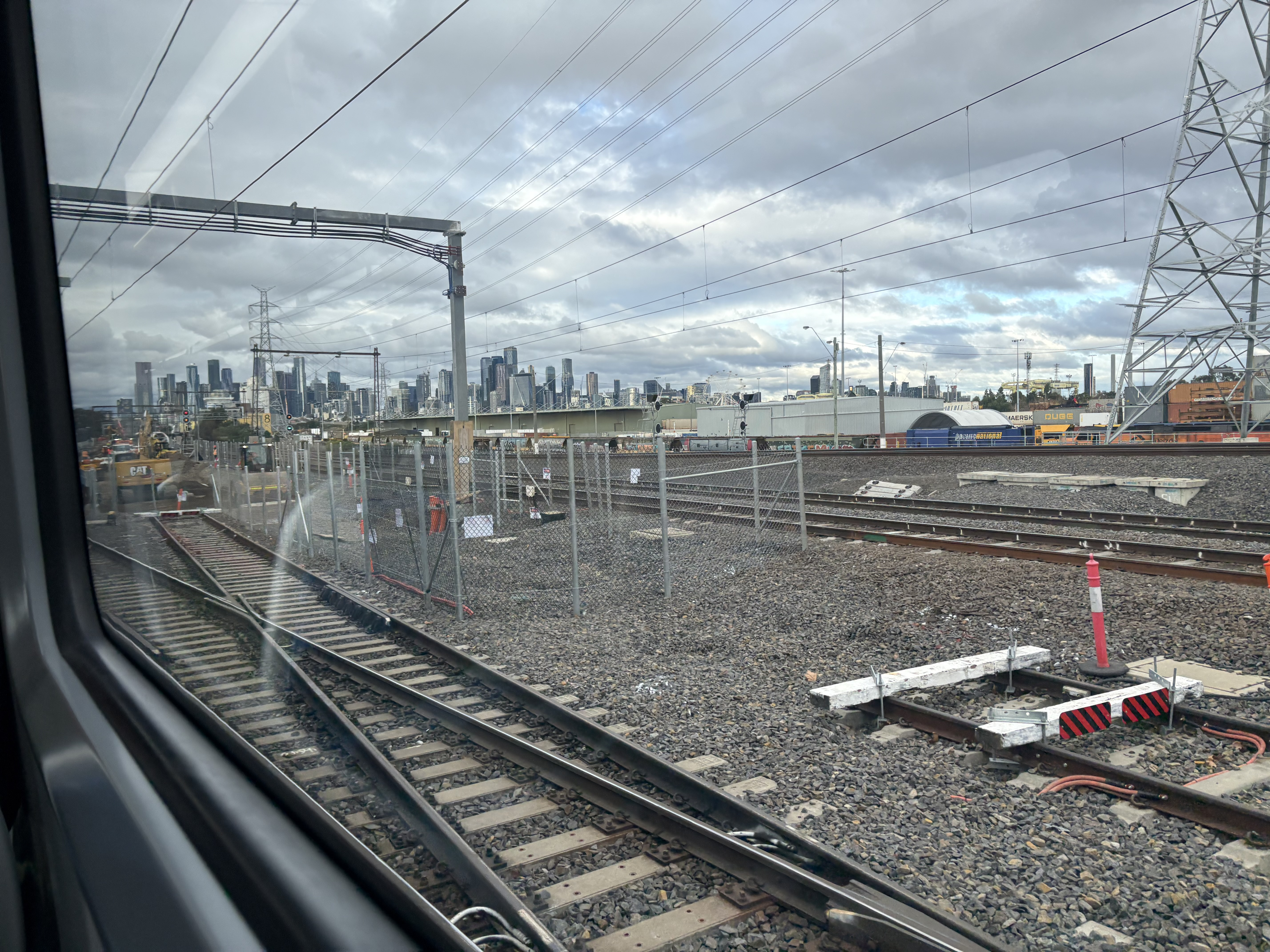
The removed Main Suburban tracks

The current configuration of the station dates from 2014, following the construction of the Regional Rail Link (RRL). The goods-only tracks immediately to the south were replaced by a pair of tracks used by regional passenger services operating to and from Southern Cross on the RRL. The signal box, formerly located at the up end of the down platform (Platform 2), was demolished to make way for the new RRL tracks. A mural on Childers Street, outside the station, was funded by the City–Maribyrnong River arm of the RRL project, but it has since been painted over.

== History ==
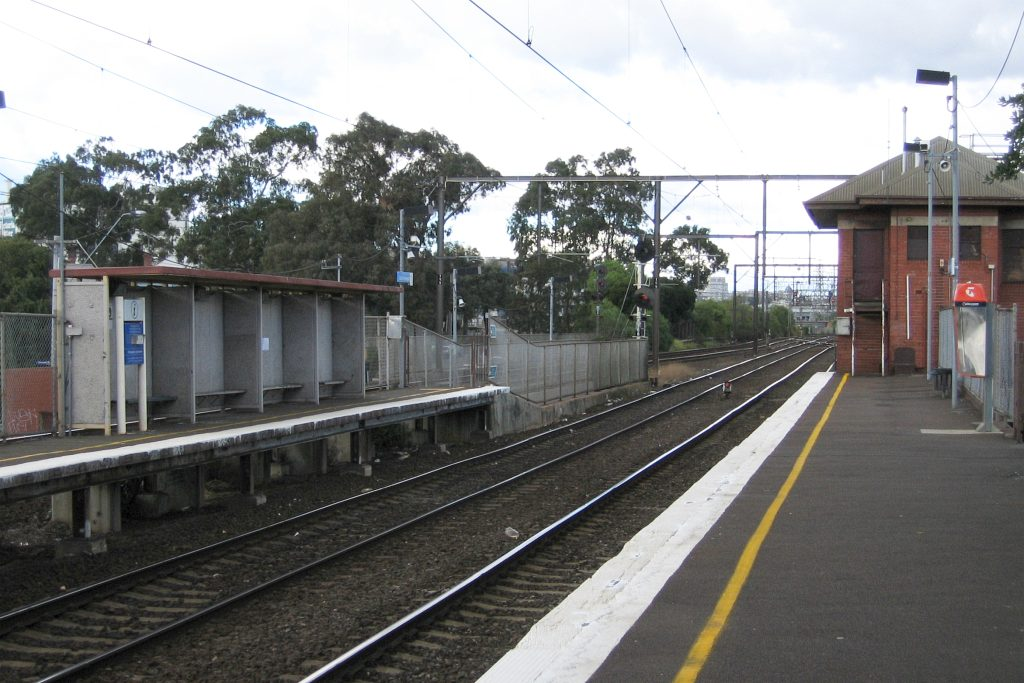
Eastbound view from Platform 2, with the now-demolished signal box, July 2005

In 1972, the platforms were extended at the down end of the station. In 1975, the present platform shelters were provided, when the station was modified to accommodate the quadruplication of the line to Footscray. The station office, now disused, located near the entrance to the pedestrian underpass on Childers Street, was also provided around that time. On 1 July of that year, parcel facilities at the station were abolished. The following year, in November 1976, the quadruplicated line between South Kensington and Footscray was opened.

In 2020, in a survey conducted by the RACV, South Kensington was ranked as the worst railway station in Victoria.

In July 2023, the crossovers which connected from the station onto the Sunbury Line were abolished and removed with the installation of pointwork for the Metro Tunnel. In late May 2026, work began to remove the old Sunbury line tracks at South Kensington, which had become redundant since the Sunbury line was moved into the Metro Tunnel full-time on 1 February 2026. The track and overhead wiring was removed between 23 and 25 May 2026.

The adjacent western portal to the Metro Tunnel was rebuilt in July 2026. These works removed the disused points for the Main Suburban lines and allowed for trains entering and exiting the tunnel to operate at higher speeds.

== Platforms and services ==
South Kensington has two side platforms and is served by Werribee and Williamstown trains.

South Kensington platform arrangement
Platform	Line	Destination	Via	Service Type	Notes	Source
1	Werribee line Williamstown line	Flinders Street or Sandringham	Flinders Street	All stations		
2	Werribee line	Laverton or Werribee	Altona	All stations		
2	Williamstown line	Williamstown		All stations		
