= Footscray railway station =

Railway station in Melbourne, Australia

Footscray
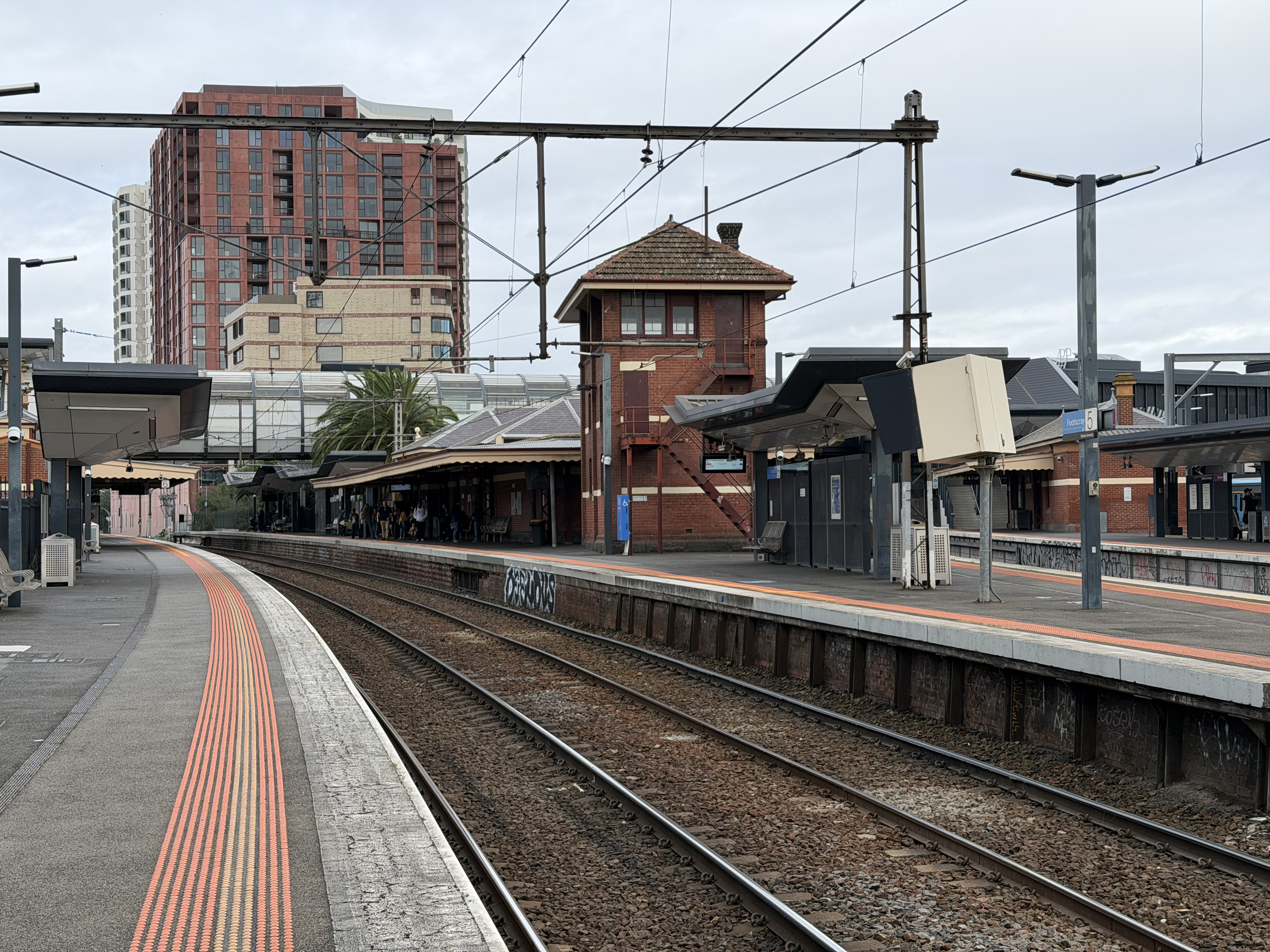
- Westbound view from Platform 6, July 2026

General information
- Location: Irving Street, Footscray, Victoria 3011; City of Maribyrnong; Australia
- Coordinates: 37°48′06″S 144°54′09″E
- System: PTV commuter and regional rail station
- Owner: VicTrack
- Operator: Metro Trains
- Lines: Metropolitan: Sunbury; Werribee Williamstown; Regional: Bendigo Echuca Swan Hill (Deniliquin and Piangil); Ballarat Ararat Maryborough Geelong Warrnambool (Ararat)
- Distance: 5.62 kilometres from Southern Cross
- Platforms: 6 (2 side, 2 island)
- Tracks: 6
- Connections: Bus; Tram

Construction
- Structure type: Ground
- Parking: Yes
- Cycle facilities: Yes
- Accessible: Yes—step free access

Other information
- Status: Operational, premium station
- Station code: FSY
- Fare zone: Myki zone 1
- Website: Public Transport Victoria

History
- Opened: 17 January 1859; 167 years ago
- Rebuilt: 16 September 1900; 20 January 2014
- Electrified: August 1920 (1500 V DC overhead)

Passengers
- 2019–2020: 4,038,750 ▼24.26%
- 2020–2021: 2,056,000 ▼49.09%
- 2021–2022: 2,783,000 ▲35.36%
- 2022–2023: 3,957,000 ▲42.18%
- 2023–2024: 4,365,800 ▲10.33%
- 2024–2025: 4,383,950 ▲0.42%

Services
Preceding station	Metro Trains	Following station
Services to Town Hall
Arden towards Cranbourne or East Pakenham via Metro Tunnel	Sunbury line	Middle Footscray towards Watergardens or Sunbury
Services to Flinders Street
South Kensington towards Sandringham via Flinders Street	Werribee line	Seddon towards Laverton, Werribee or Williamstown
South Kensington towards Sandringham via Flinders Street	Williamstown line	Seddon towards Laverton, Werribee or Williamstown
North Melbourne towards Sandringham via Flinders Street	Werribee line Weekday express services	Newport towards Werribee
V/Line services
Preceding station	V/Line	Following station
Southern Cross Terminus	Bendigo line	Watergardens or Sunbury towards Bendigo or Echuca
Southern Cross Terminus	Echuca line	Watergardens or Sunbury towards Bendigo or Echuca
Southern Cross Terminus	Swan Hill line	Watergardens towards Swan Hill
Southern Cross Terminus	Ballarat line	Sunshine towards Melton, Wendouree, Maryborough or Ararat
Southern Cross Terminus	Melton line	Sunshine towards Melton, Wendouree, Maryborough or Ararat
Southern Cross Terminus	Ararat line	Sunshine towards Melton, Wendouree, Maryborough or Ararat
Southern Cross Terminus	Maryborough line	Sunshine towards Melton, Wendouree, Maryborough or Ararat
Southern Cross Terminus	Geelong line	Sunshine towards Waurn Ponds
Southern Cross Terminus	Warrnambool line	Geelong towards Warrnambool
Former Services
Preceding station	Metro Trains	Following station
South Kensington towards Flinders Street	Sunbury line Pre 2013	Middle Footscray towards Watergardens or Sunbury
North Melbourne towards Flinders Street	Sunbury line 2013-2026	Middle Footscray towards Watergardens or Sunbury
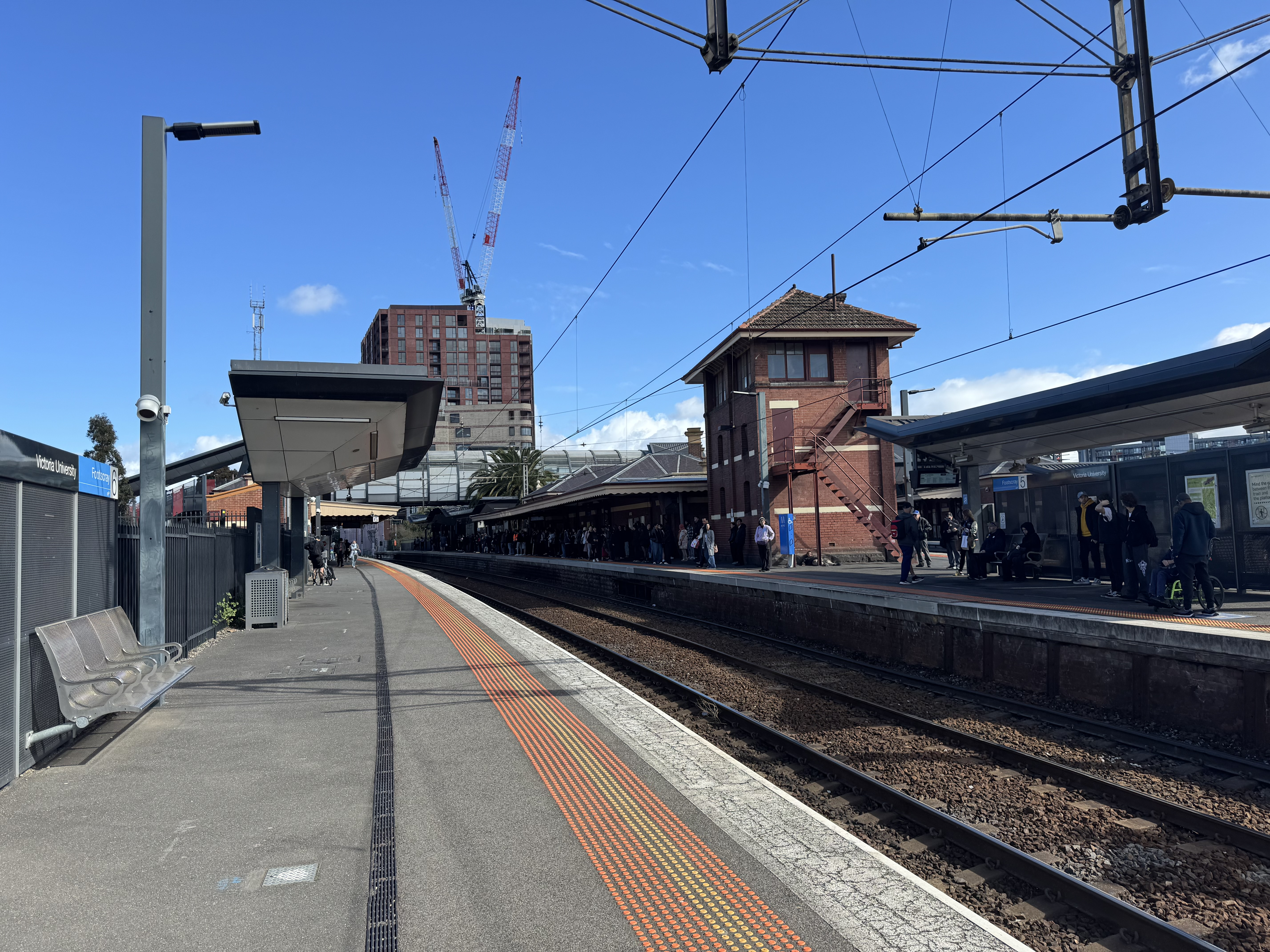
- The disused signal box, part of the heritage site, 2025

Site notes
- Architectural style: Victorian Free Classical

Victorian Heritage Register
- Official name: Footscray Railway Station Complex
- Type: Registered place
- Designated: 17 June 1999
- Reference no.: H1563
- Heritage overlay no.: HO49
- Categories: Parks, Gardens and Trees; Transport - Rail
Track layout
Location

Footscray station is a railway station operated by Metro Trains Melbourne and V/Line on the metropolitan Sunbury, Werribee and Williamstown lines and the regional Ballarat, Bendigo and Geelong lines, part of the Melbourne and Victorian rail networks. It serves the western Melbourne suburb of Footscray in Victoria, Australia.

Footscray is a ground level premium station, featuring six platforms, two island platform with two faces and two side platform, connected by an accessible overground concourse. It opened on 17 January 1859, with the current location provided in 1900 and station provided in 2014.

A disused signal box is located on the island platform at the up end of Platform 5. A pair of dual gauge tracks for the South Kensington–West Footscray line run in a cutting under the station before entering the Bunbury Street tunnel, providing a rail link to the Port of Melbourne and other freight terminals, as well as access to Southern Cross station for the NSW TrainLink XPT, The Overland, and V/Line Albury passenger services.

The station complex, inclusive of the adjacent reserve and its octagonal band rotunda, was added to the Victorian Heritage Register on 17 June 1999 in recognition of its aesthetic, architectural, social and historical importance.

== History ==
On 17 January 1859, the railway arrived in Footscray, when the Williamstown line opened, with trains operating from Spencer Street in Melbourne to the important port of Williamstown. The line between Melbourne and Williamstown, via the North Melbourne and Footscray, had been made possible by the construction of the Saltwater River Rail Bridge over the Maribyrnong River.

Not long after, that line was connected to the 18-month-old Geelong line at a junction near the current Newport station. The original Footscray station opened on the first day of service. It was not where the current Footscray station is but was located at Napier Street.

Less than a month later, on 10 February 1859, Footscray became a junction when a line, branching at Footscray, was opened to Sunbury, extended to Sandhurst (later renamed Bendigo) in 1862. On 1 March 1859, Footscray's second station, on the Sunbury line, opened at Nicholson Street, not far from the Napier Street location. In 1879, a signal box was provided at the junction.

On 16 September 1900, a new station was opened at the present location, the junction of the two lines. The two other stations were then closed.

A number of sidings once existed at the station, but that site, on the eastern side of the Newport-bound lines, is now used for car parking. In 1972, the last siding at Footscray (siding "B") was abolished.

On 21 October 1928, the two tracks under the station were opened, as part of the South Kensington–West Footscray line. They were dual-gauged in the early 1960s, as part of the construction of the Melbourne–Albury standard gauge line. Quadruplication of the tracks towards Melbourne in November 1976 eliminated the switched junction and so the signal box was closed, although the building forms part of the structures included on the Victorian Heritage Register.

On 31 May 1996, Footscray was upgraded to a premium station, although the enclosed waiting area and ticket facilities were built in 1993, as part of the "Travel Safe" program of the early 1990s.

At around 08:30 on 5 June 2001, on Platform 4, an out-of-service train heading to Newport collided with a Williamstown-bound train carrying about 20 passengers. Three injuries were reported.

In 2010, as a part of the Brumby State Government's Footscray renewal program, the footbridge over the platforms, which was accessed by ramps, was replaced with a new $15 million footbridge. The bridge, named after Indigenous activist William Cooper, had stairs and associated lifts. There were complaints that the new footbridge was less usable than the one it replaced. The roof was not weatherproof, and the lifts were prone to breakdown.

During the 2017/2018 financial year, Footscray was the sixth-busiest station on the Melbourne metropolitan network, with 5.26 million passenger movements recorded.

=== Regional Rail Link upgrade ===
From 2012 to 2014, Footscray station underwent a major upgrade and conservation works as part of the Regional Rail Link project. An additional two platforms were provided to the north of the existing ones, to allow the separation of Sunbury Metro train services and V/Line train services to Ballarat, Bendigo and Geelong. On 20 January 2014, coinciding with the opening of the new platforms, ticket office and a waiting area adjacent to Platform 1 on Irving Street, Platforms 1 to 4 were renumbered 3 to 6, with the new platforms becoming Platforms 1 and 2. At the same time, Platforms 3 and 4 were temporarily closed, so that they could be rebuilt as platforms for V/Line services. They reopened when the new Regional Rail Link tracks between Sunshine and Southern Cross were brought into service on 16 July 2014. A new waiting area and toilet facilities for regional services was provided between Platforms 4 and 5.

The $15 million footbridge, erected in 2010, was partially demolished in 2013 to accommodate the works. New canopies, stairs and escalators were installed at the Irving and Hyde Street ends of the footbridge, and wider ramps were built from the footbridge to the platforms and the street level, to allow easier access to the platforms. New lifts were also added to the structure.

The car-park on Irving Street was relocated to McNab Avenue, and a new forecourt, with greenery and seating areas was opened, along with two new kiosks, close to the Irving Street station entrance.

By November 2014, all works at the station had been completed.

=== Heritage structures ===
Parts of the station complex were added to the Victoria Heritage Register in 1999 and include the four platforms and three red brick station structures, the disused signal box—all completed between 1859 and c. 1908 in the Victorian Free Classical style—and the adjacent one-hectare (two-acre) reserve and its ornamental gardens and rotunda, situated south-west of the station buildings. Common building details include cantilevered platform canopies, cement banding, bluestone quoin work around doors, arched windows and stucco cornice bands. The octagonal band rotunda was built up on cast iron columns, with brackets and friezes adorning the timber-framed sheet iron clad roof with lantern.

== Usage ==
Passenger usage at Footscray Station between 2008 and 2024 sorted by financial year.

Footscray is the fifth-busiest station on Melbourne's metropolitan rail network with 4.37 million passengers in 2023-24.

== Platforms and services ==
Footscray has two island platforms with four faces, and two side platforms. It is served by Sunbury, Werribee and Williamstown line trains, and V/Line Ballarat, Bendigo and Geelong line trains.

=== Metropolitan services ===
Footscray platform arrangement
Platform	Line	Destination	Via	Service Pattern	Notes	Source
1	Sunbury line	Westall, Dandenong, East Pakenham or Cranbourne	Town Hall	All stations and limited express services	Services to Westall and Dandenong only operate during weekday peaks.	
2	Sunbury line	West Footscray, Watergardens or Sunbury		All stations	Services to West Footscray only operate during weekday peaks, late nights and weekend mornings.	
3	V/Line services				Set-down only	
4	V/Line services				Pick-up only	
5	Werribee line Williamstown line	Flinders Street or Sandringham	Flinders Street	All stations and limited express services		
6	Williamstown line	Williamstown		All stations and limited express services		
6	Werribee line	Laverton or Werribee	Altona	All stations		
6	Werribee line	Werribee		Limited Express services	Only operates on weekdays.	

=== Regional ===
Footscray platform arrangement
Platform	Line	Destination	Service Pattern	Via	Notes	Source
3	Ballarat line Ararat line Ararat line Maryborough line Bendigo line Echuca line Swan Hill line Geelong line Warrnambool line	Southern Cross	All stations		Set-down only Maryborough line: One daily V/Line service	
4	Ballarat line Ararat line Ararat line	Melton, Bacchus Marsh, Wendouree or Ararat	All stations and limited express services	Sunshine	Pick-up only Maryborough line: One daily V/Line service	
4	Geelong line Warrnambool line	Wyndham Vale, Geelong, Waurn Ponds or Warrnambool	All stations and limited express services	Sunshine	Pick-up only Services to Wyndham Vale and Geelong operate on weekdays only.	
4	Bendigo line Echuca line Swan Hill line	Bendigo, Epsom, Eaglehawk, Echuca or Swan Hill	All stations and limited express services	Sunbury	Pick-up only Services to Epsom and Eaglehawk operate on weekdays only.	

== Transport links ==
CDC Melbourne operates six bus routes via Footscray station, under contract to Public Transport Victoria:

- 406 : to Keilor East
- 409 : Yarraville station – Highpoint Shopping Centre
- 410 : Sunshine station – Footscray
- 411 : Laverton station – Footscray
- 412 : Laverton station – Footscray
- 414 : to Laverton station

Kinetic Melbourne operates three bus routes via Footscray station, under contract to Public Transport Victoria:

- 216 : Sunshine station – Melbourne CBD (Queen Street)
- 220 : Sunshine station – Melbourne CBD (Queen Street)
- 223 : Yarraville – Highpoint Shopping Centre

Transit Systems Victoria operates four bus routes via Footscray station, under contract to Public Transport Victoria:

- 402 : to East Melbourne
- 404 : to Moonee Ponds Junction
- 472 : Williamstown – Moonee Ponds Junction
- Night Bus 947 : Footscray – Newport station (Saturday and Sunday mornings only)

Yarra Trams operate one route to and from Footscray station:

- : to Moonee Ponds Junction

== Gallery ==
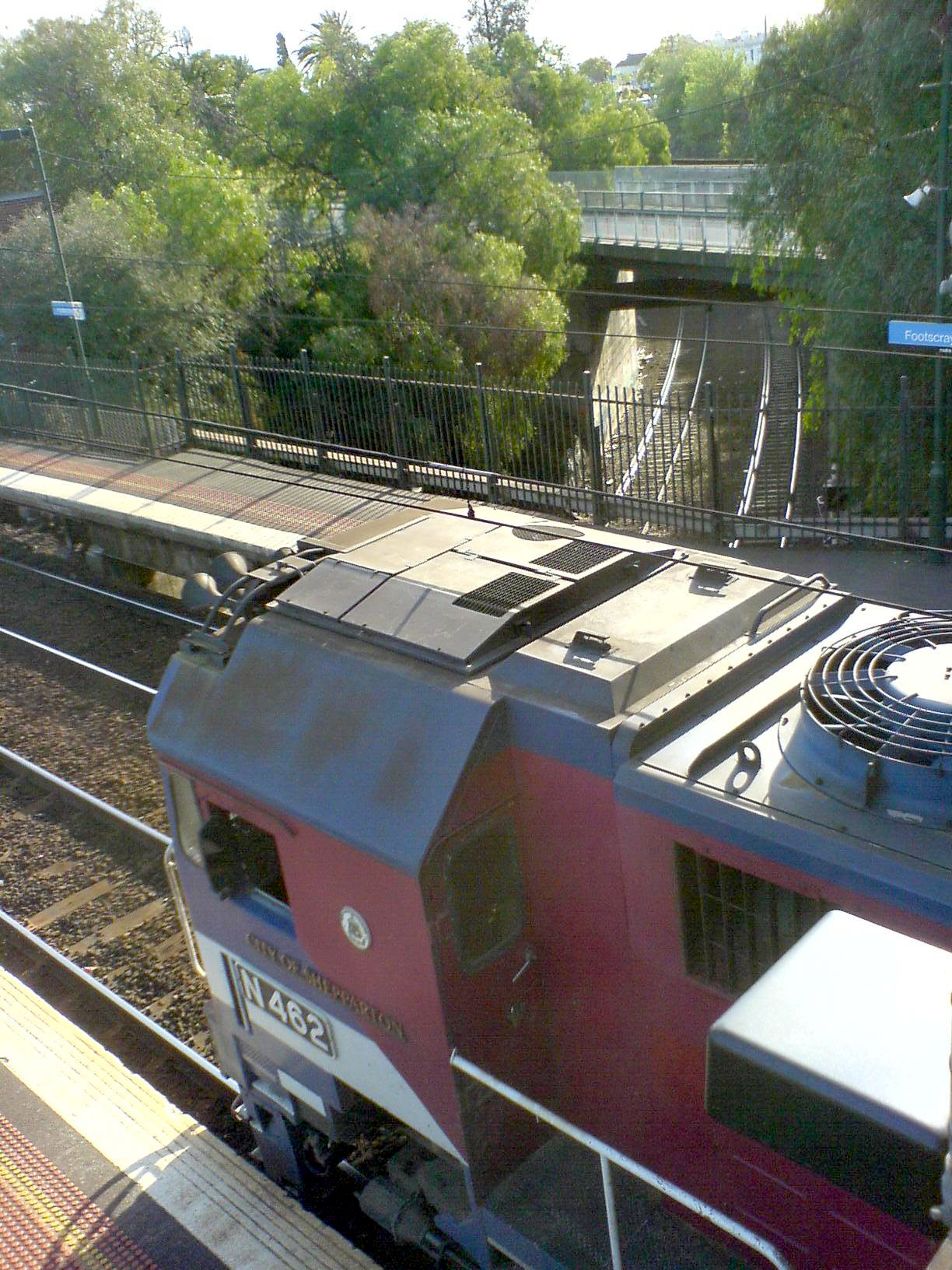
The South Kensington - West Footscray railway line cutting runs beneath the south-western end of Platforms 5 and 6, 2008

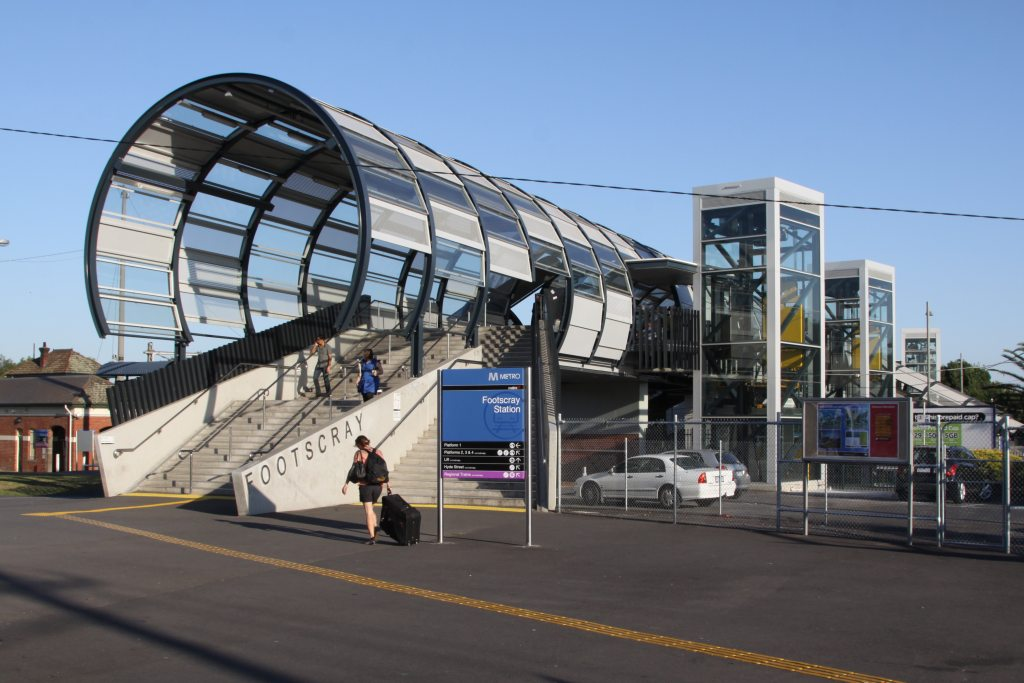
Footbridge that links all platforms, from Irving Street, 2011

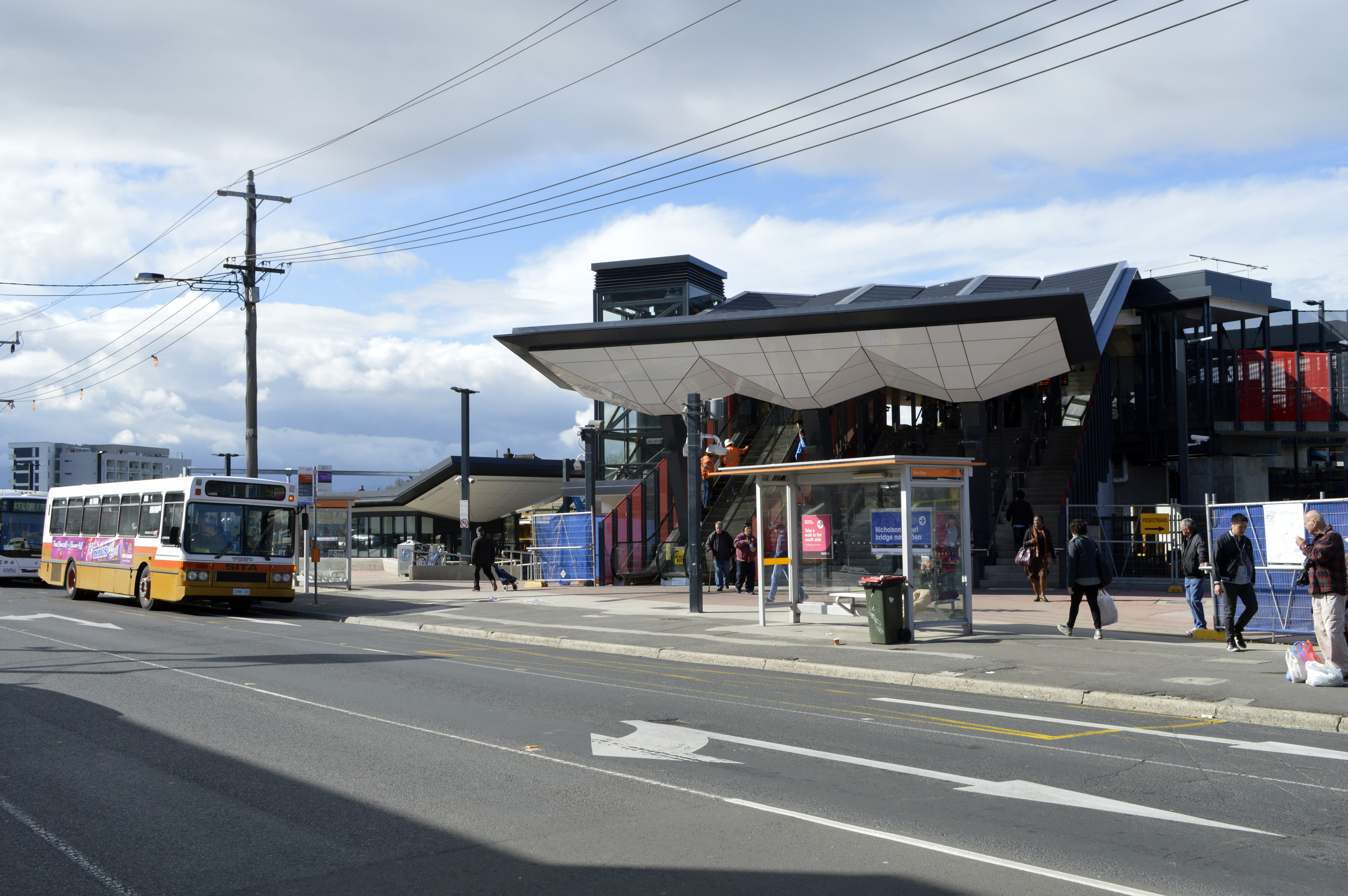
Irving Street station entrance, 2014

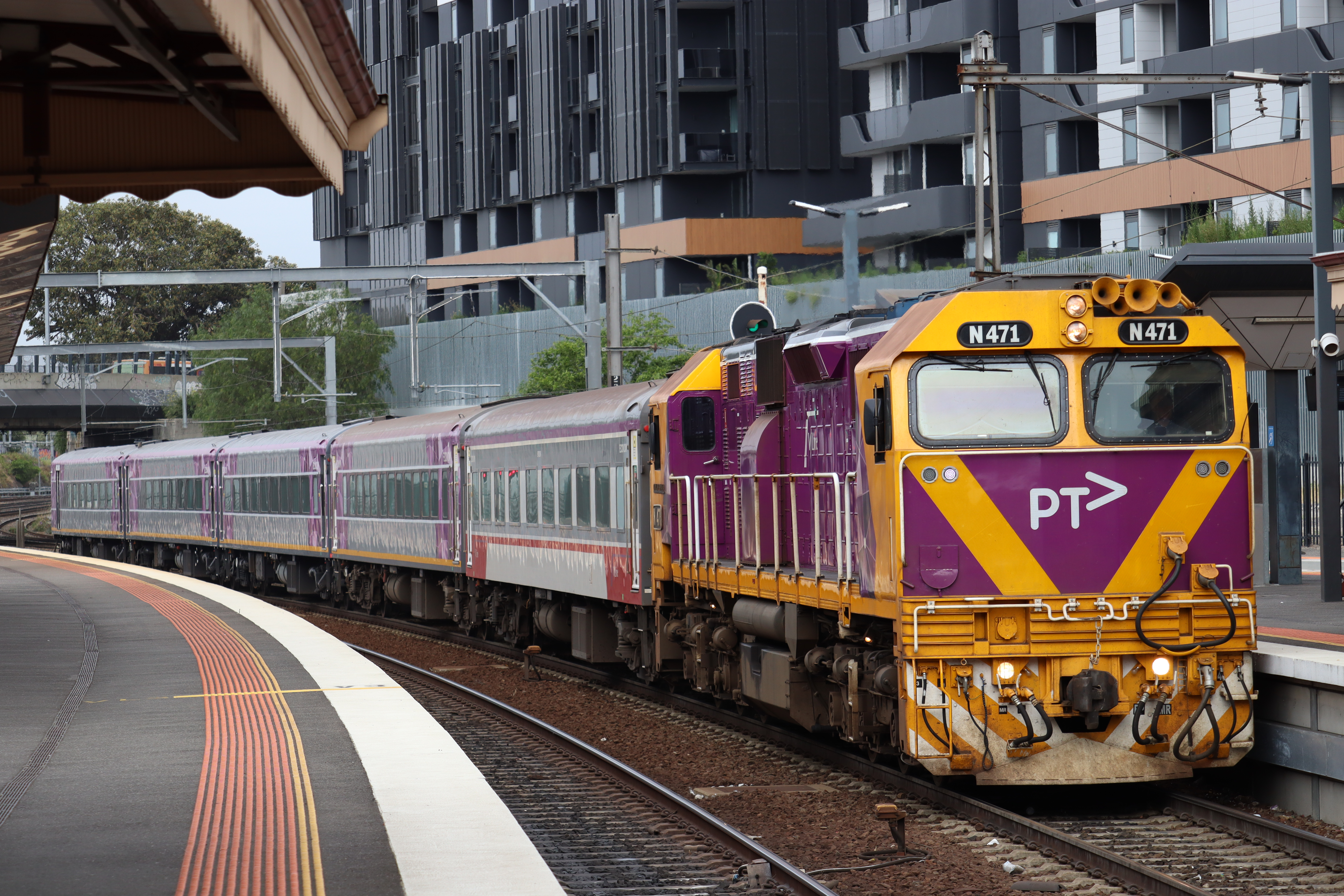
V/Line passenger service at the station, 2022

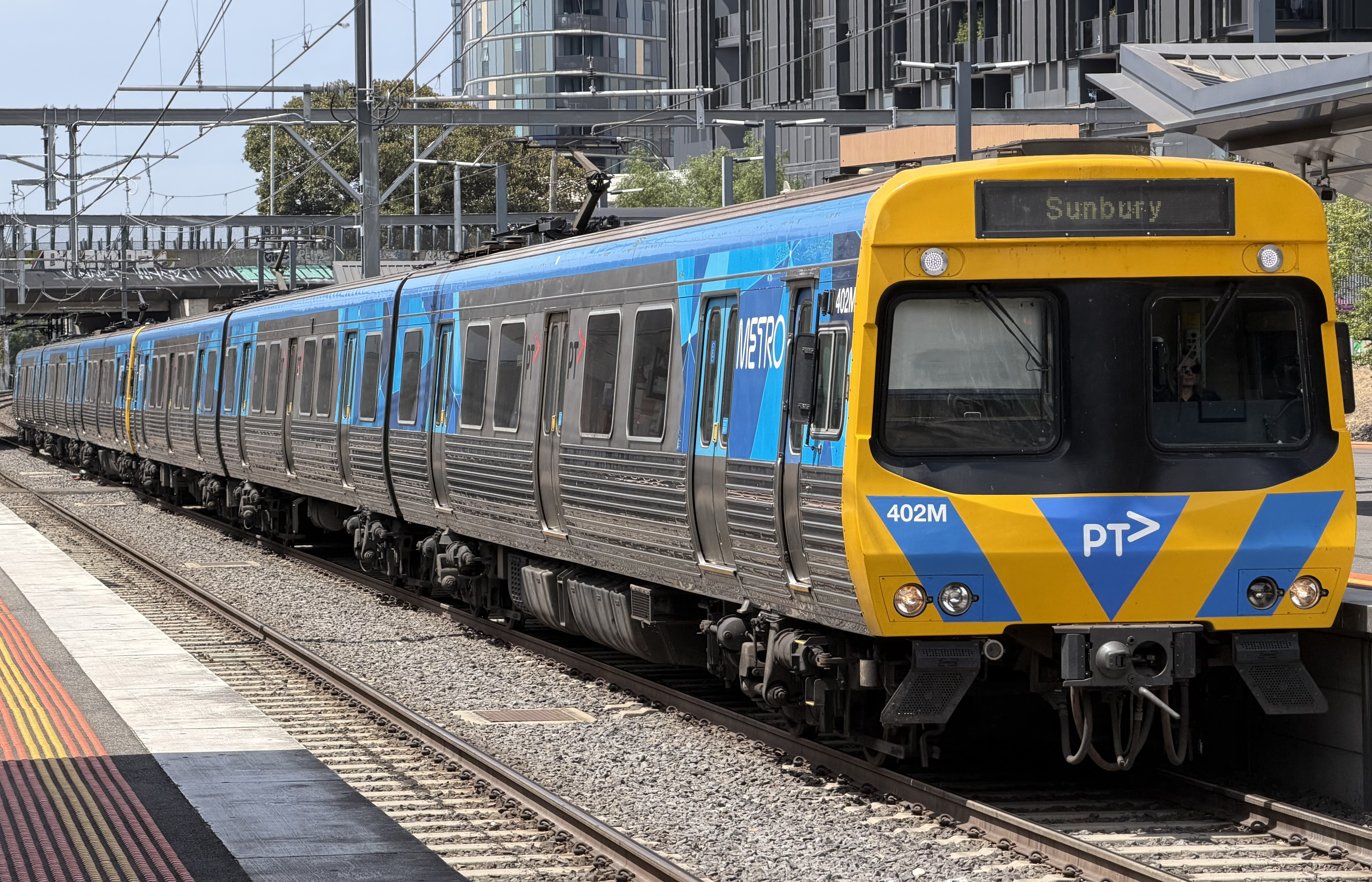
Sunbury service at Platform 2, 2026

== See also ==
- List of railway stations in Melbourne
- List of places on the Victorian Heritage Register in the City of Maribyrnong
