= Fruit Flyer =

Former overnight train in Australia

Overview
- Service type: Freight train
- First service: 13 October 1958
- Former operator(s): Victorian Railways

Route
- Termini: Mildura; Dynon Freight Terminal
- Stops: Irymple; Red Cliffs; Carwarp; Hattah
- Distance travelled: 566 kilometres
- Average journey time: 10 hours
- Service frequency: 6 x weekly (Sun-Fri)
- Line(s) used: Mildura; Serviceton

Technical
- Track gauge: 1,600 mm (5 ft 3 in)
- Operating speed: 110 km/h

The Fruit Flyer was a fast overnight freight train operated by the Victorian Railways to bring fruit produce from the Mildura district to the Melbourne Markets. It first ran on 13 October 1958.

It departed Mildura at 17:00, loading at Irymple, Red Cliffs, Carwarp and Hattah before running express to Dynon Freight Terminal arriving at 03:00. To allow it to operate at the line speed of 70 mph (110 km/h), the wagons were fitted with bogies similar to those fitted on passenger carriages.

It initially operated three times weekly on Monday, Wednesday and Friday nights, but within a few weeks this had increased to four times. By 1961 it was running six times a week, Sunday to Friday.
