= South Kensington–West Footscray railway line =

Railway line in Melbourne, Australia

South Kensington–West Footscray line

Overview
- Owner: VicTrack
- Termini: South Kensington; West Footscray

Service
- Type: Freight and regional passenger
- System: Victorian rail network
- Services: Albury V/Line rail service Sydney-Melbourne rail corridor
- Operator: V/Line (infrastructure manager)

History
- Opened: 21 October 1928

Technical
- Num of tracks: 2
- Track gauge: 1,435 mm (4 ft 8 1/2 in) standard gauge 1,600 mm (5 ft 3 in) Victorian broad gauge
- Signalling: Victorian three-position

The South Kensington–West Footscray line is a railway line in the inner western suburbs of Melbourne, Australia. Linking South Kensington station on the Werribee line and associated freight terminals to Tottenham Yard and other freight lines, it is a primarily freight only line with no overhead wires, passenger stations or platforms. The most visible part of the line is where it dives under Footscray station and into a tunnel under nearby Bunbury Street.

== History ==
The line was opened on 21 October 1928 to allow freight trains to avoid suburban passenger train congestion at Footscray station which, at that time, was connected to Melbourne by a single pair of tracks. Initially consisting of two broad gauge tracks, in 1962 the tracks were converted to dual gauge as part of the Melbourne to Sydney gauge standardisation project. Today the line is controlled by the Australian Rail Track Corporation as part of the North East railway line. In 2008–2009, the conventionally signalled double track between Sims Street Junction and West Footscray was converted to bi-directional operation, with an additional standard gauge track constructed between West Footscray and Tottenham, at a cost of $45 million.

In recent years due to growing congestion on the above ground lines though Footscray, various proposals have been made for increased numbers of passenger services to use the line. In 2010 it was announced that the Regional Rail Link project would not use the freight lines, instead using new tracks to be built through Footscray.

== Route ==
Built as a double track railway, the line starts in the Spion Kop area of Melbourne Yard, near Moonee Ponds Creek and the CityLink flyover. It then runs west to South Kensington station, where there is a junction with the main passenger lines, before it runs south of the passenger platforms. Curving south-west, lines from North Dynon merge, before crossing Dynon Road on an overpass. Sims Street Junction is reached, where the standard gauge track from Southern Cross station joins the line, as well as additional lines from the Port of Melbourne and South Dynon.

The line then curves to the west and crosses a large steel truss bridge over the Maribyrnong River, before entering the Bunbury Street Tunnel, built by cut and cover methods under the roadway of the same name. The tunnel emerges into a deep cutting that runs under Footscray Station, reaching ground level by Middle Footscray station. Running north of the Sunbury suburban line the lines continue parallel to West Footscray station where the freight line slews around the station platform. Here the standard gauge continues north around Tottenham Yard before becoming the North East and Western standard gauge lines, while the broad gauge continues through the yard, before reaching the Newport–Sunshine line and Sunshine station.

Freight trains from the north, north-east, west and south-west use the line to access the rail freight terminals in the Dynon area, as well as the Port of Melbourne. The only passenger services using the line operate on the standard gauge, being the daily NSW TrainLink XPT, the Great Southern Rail operated The Overland and standard gauge Albury V/Line rail service. V/Line uses the tracks south of South Kensington for the reversal of trains operating on the Traralgon and Bairnsdale lines to avoid blocking other trains at Southern Cross station. Other than standard gauge services, V/Line do not operate passenger services along the line, except in times of disruptions to normal routes.

== Line guide ==
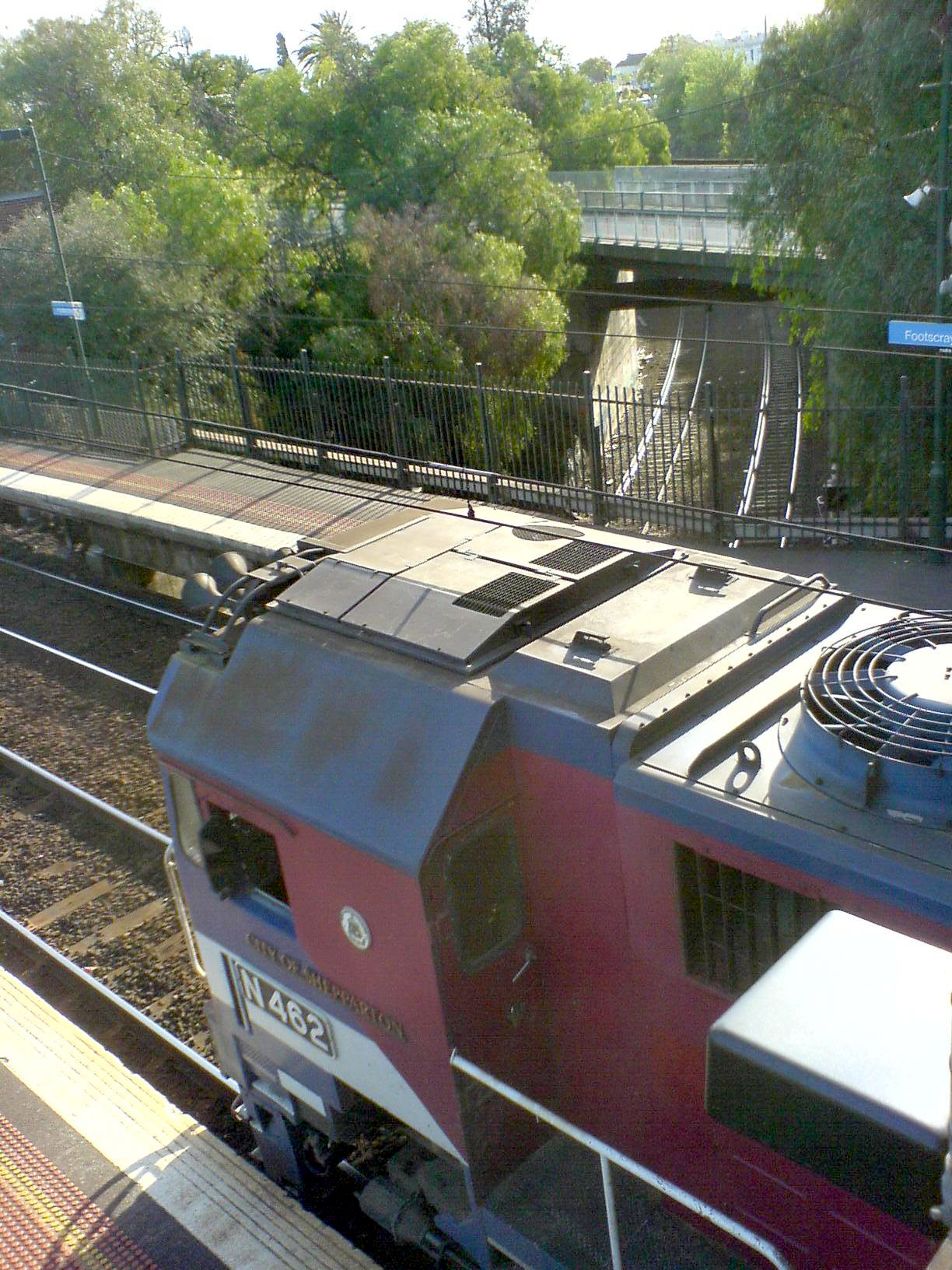
The line running beneath the Footscray station platforms, south-western end

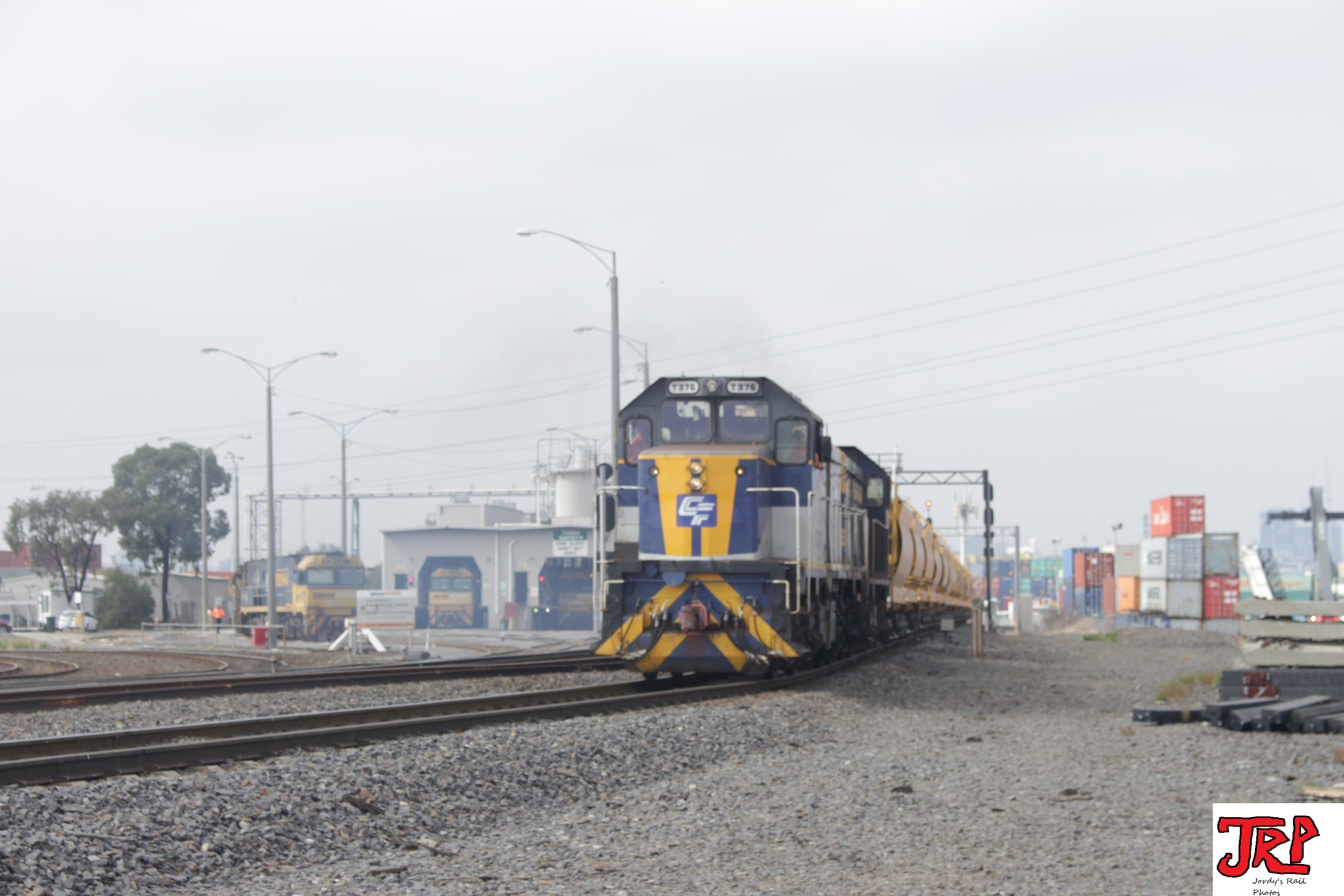
Quad T's at Sims Street Junction heading to Tottenham

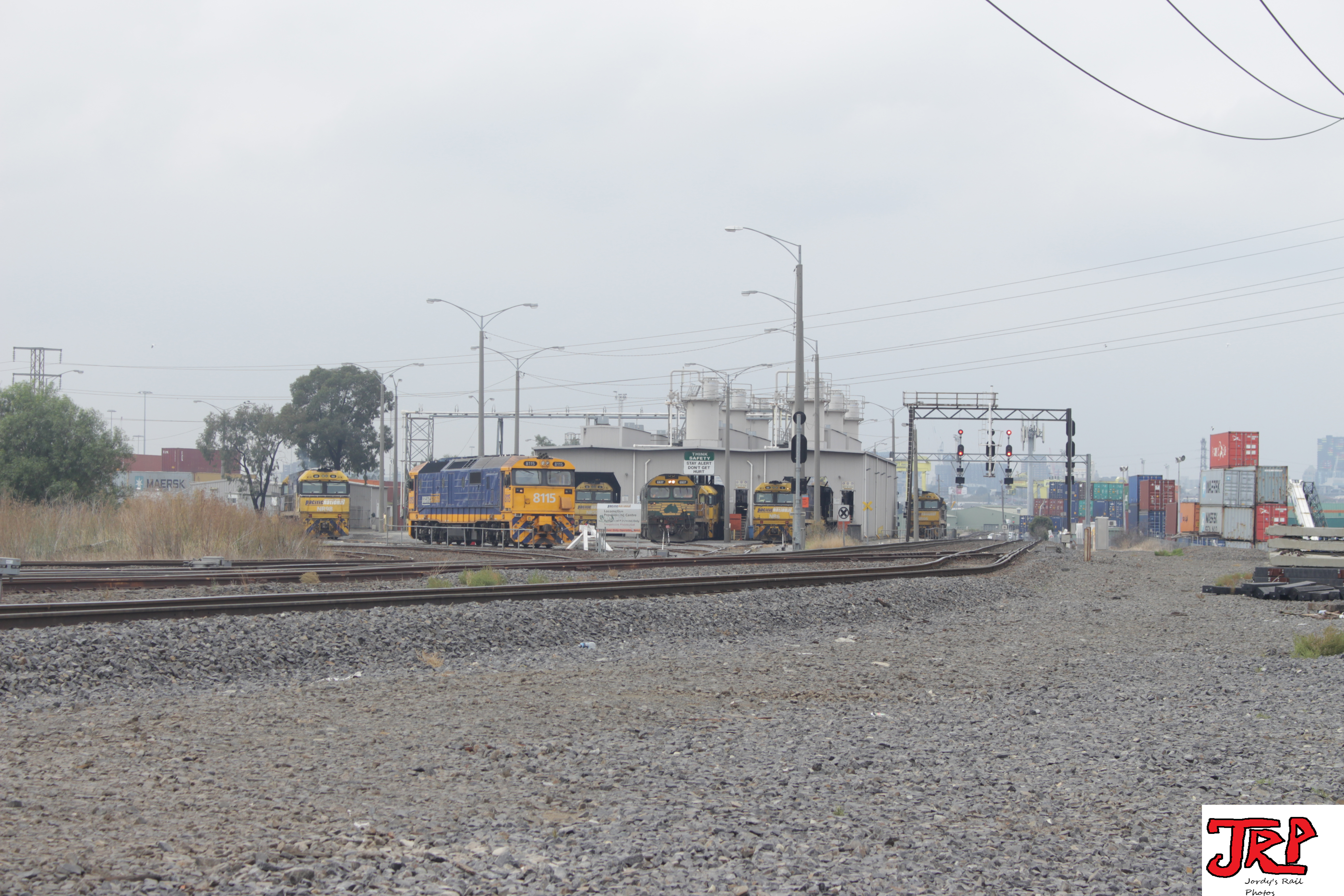
The Pacific National Locomotive Provisioning Centre

Red is broad gauge, blue is dual or standard gauge.
