= Middle Footscray railway station =

Railway station in Melbourne, Australia

Middle Footscray
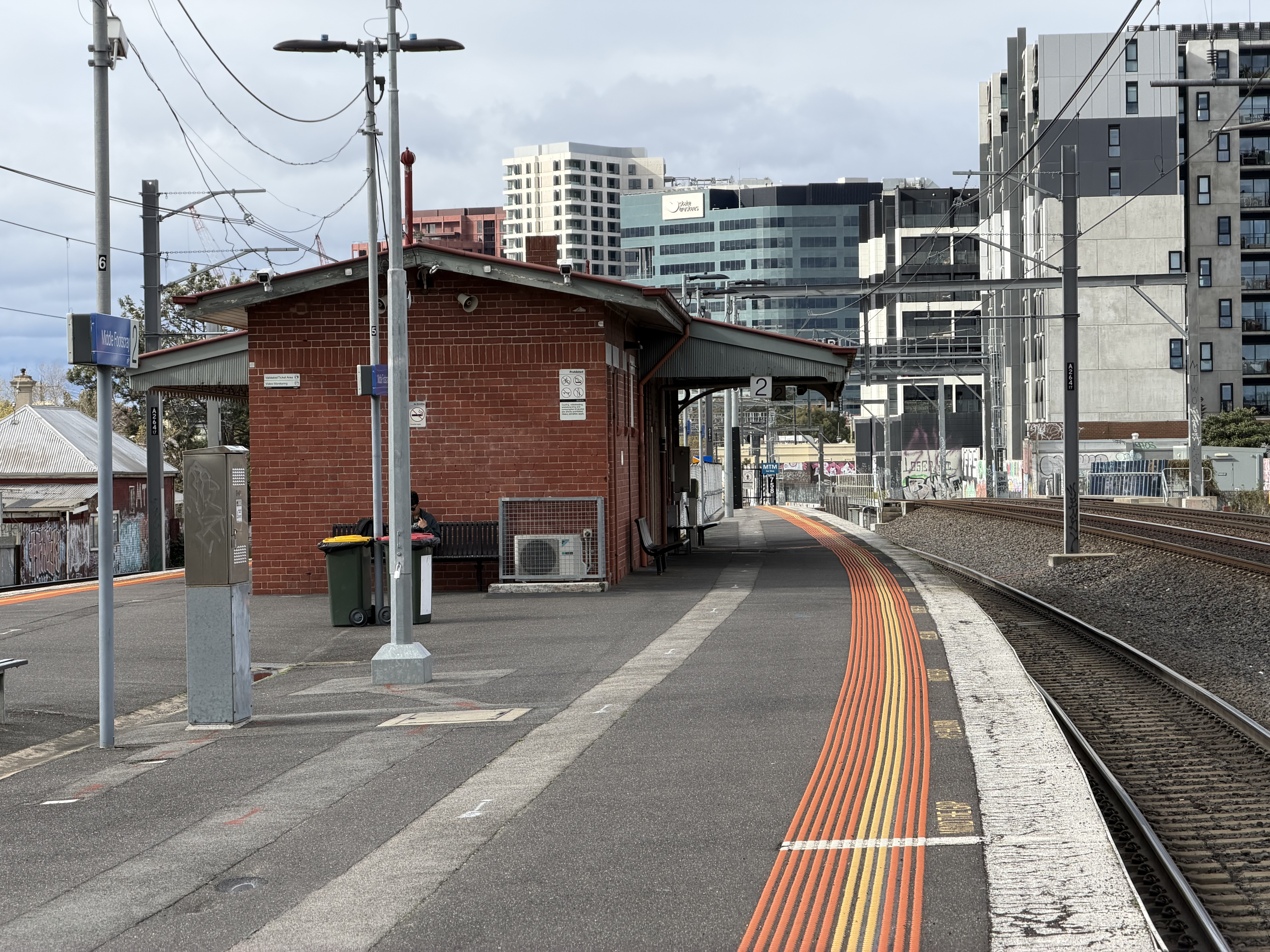
- Eastbound view from Platform 2, June 2026

General information
- Location: Victoria Street, Footscray, Victoria 3011; City of Maribyrnong; Australia
- Coordinates: 37°48′09″S 144°53′29″E
- System: PTV commuter rail station
- Owner: VicTrack
- Operator: Metro Trains
- Line: Sunbury
- Distance: 6.61 kilometres from Southern Cross
- Platforms: 2 (1 island)
- Tracks: 6
- Connections: Bus

Construction
- Structure type: Ground
- Accessible: No—steep ramp

Other information
- Status: Operational, unstaffed
- Station code: MFY
- Fare zone: Myki zone 1
- Website: Public Transport Victoria

History
- Opened: 10 December 1906; 119 years ago
- Rebuilt: 3 July 1927
- Electrified: October 1921 (1500 V DC overhead)
- Former names: Footscray Central

Passengers
- 2005–2006: 126,994
- 2006–2007: 140,937 ▲10.97%
- 2007–2008: 158,060 ▲12.14%
- 2008–2009: 184,624 ▲16.8%
- 2009–2010: 207,883 ▲12.59%
- 2010–2011: 203,879 ▼1.92%
- 2011–2012: 179,465 ▼11.97%
- 2012–2013: Not measured
- 2013–2014: 192,033 ▲7%
- 2014–2015: 223,294 ▲16.27%
- 2015–2016: 241,435 ▲8.12%
- 2016–2017: 251,017 ▲3.96%
- 2017–2018: 281,974 ▲12.33%
- 2018–2019: 279,700 ▼0.8%
- 2019–2020: 191,600 ▼31.49%
- 2020–2021: 81,800 ▼57.3%
- 2021–2022: 103,450 ▲26.46%

Services
Preceding station	Metro Trains	Following station
Footscray towards Cranbourne or East Pakenham via Metro Tunnel	Sunbury line	West Footscray Terminus
Footscray towards Cranbourne or East Pakenham via Metro Tunnel	Sunbury line	West Footscray towards Watergardens or Sunbury
Track layout
Location

Middle Footscray station is a railway station operated by Metro Trains Melbourne on the Sunbury line, part of the Melbourne rail network. It serves the western suburb of Footscray, in Melbourne, Victoria, Australia. Middle Footscray station is a ground-level unstaffed station, featuring an island platform. It opened on 10 December 1906, with the current station provided in 1927.

Two dual gauge goods tracks run north of the station, linking the Port of Melbourne and other freight terminals to the rest of the state. Since 1962, those tracks have formed part of the Melbourne – Sydney standard gauge line and, since 1995, have also formed part of the Melbourne – Adelaide standard gauge line. Two Regional Rail Link tracks run south of the station.

== History ==
=== Footscray Country ===
The first station to be located near to where Middle Footscray is currently located was Footscray Main Line. The station though officially named Footscray (Country) was known locally as Middle Footscray, This station opened on 1 March 1859.

On 30 June 1887, the station was renamed from Footscray Main Line to Footscray North and again in 1889 to Middle Footscray.

This station existed from the opening of the Melbourne - Bendigo railway in 1859 until 1900 when the station and Footscray (Suburban) were merged into the current Footscray station.

=== Middle Footscray ===
Middle Footscray opened in 1906 as 'Footscray Central' and consisted of two platforms originally in a side platform arrangement. The station was also formerly located between Nicholson Street and Victoria Street

In 1927, the station was reconstructed about 160 metres west of its original location, to allow for the building of the South Kensington – West Footscray goods line.

On 28 May 1923, a set of goods sidings that had existed at Middle Footscray were abolished and the points straight railed. This was done as the sidings had been made redundant by the opening of the Maribyrnong River goods line which itself had opened in 1921.

On 19 October 1926, the previous level crossing at Albert Street was closed to allow for works on grade separation and the construction of the South Kensington–West Footscray railway line. Alongside the closure of the level crossing, the signal box (Footscray C box) was abolished alongside all crossovers.

The 1906 built Middle Footscray station was closed on 2 June 1927 with all remaining signals also abolished. Between the closure of the old station and opening of the new station, the Bendigo line was progressively lowered into its new alignment into a cutting and with a bridge over Victoria Street.

Prior to 1927, a level crossing had existed at Geelong Road and was located between Middle Footscray and West Footscray. The crossing was progressively removed throughout 1927 with a temporary crossing provided during construction of a road overpass.

The new station opened on 3 July 1927, having been relocated to the western side of Victoria Street. The new station consisted an island platform. Upon the new stations opening, the station was renamed once more to Middle Footscray.

As part of the Sunbury line upgrade in 2022, both platforms at Middle Footscray were extended on the up (Footscray) end. This was to allow for the introduction of new High Capacity Metro Trains.

In 2023, a new pair of crossovers were commissioned at either end of the station as part of the West Footscray turnback project. These crossovers would allow trains to terminate at Middle Footscray from the city and Sunbury and also allowing a train to terminate at Footscray from Sunbury. At the same time as the crossovers were commissioned, Communications-based train control signalling was introduced onto the Sunbury line between West Footscray and the portal to the Metro Tunnel.

== Platforms and services ==
Middle Footscray has one island platform with two faces. It is served by Sunbury line trains.

=== Current ===
Middle Footscray platform arrangement
Platform	Line	Destination	Via	Service Type	Notes	Source
1	Sunbury line	Westall, Dandenong, East Pakenham or Cranbourne	Town Hall	All stations and limited express services	Services to Westall and Dandenong only operate during weekday peaks.	
2	Sunbury line	West Footscray, Watergardens or Sunbury		All stations	Services to West Footscray only operate during weekday peaks, late nights and weekend mornings.	

== Transport links ==
CDC Melbourne operates three bus routes via Middle Footscray station, under contract to Public Transport Victoria:

- 411 : Laverton station – Footscray
- 412 : Laverton station – Footscray
- 414 : Laverton station – Footscray station

Kinetic Melbourne operates one bus route via Middle Footscray station, under contract to Public Transport Victoria:

- 223 : Yarraville – Highpoint Shopping Centre

Transit Systems Victoria operates one bus route via Middle Footscray station, under contract to Public Transport Victoria:

- Night Bus 947 : Footscray – Newport station (Saturday and Sunday mornings only)

The bus stop is located on Buckley Street, about 100m from the station entrance on Victoria Street.
