= Newport–Sunshine railway line =

Railway line in Australia

Newport–Sunshine line

Overview
- Stations: None

Service
- Type: Freight line
- System: Freight, The Overland

History
- Opened: 1887

Technical
- Number of tracks: Single to double track, broad and dual gauge
Route map
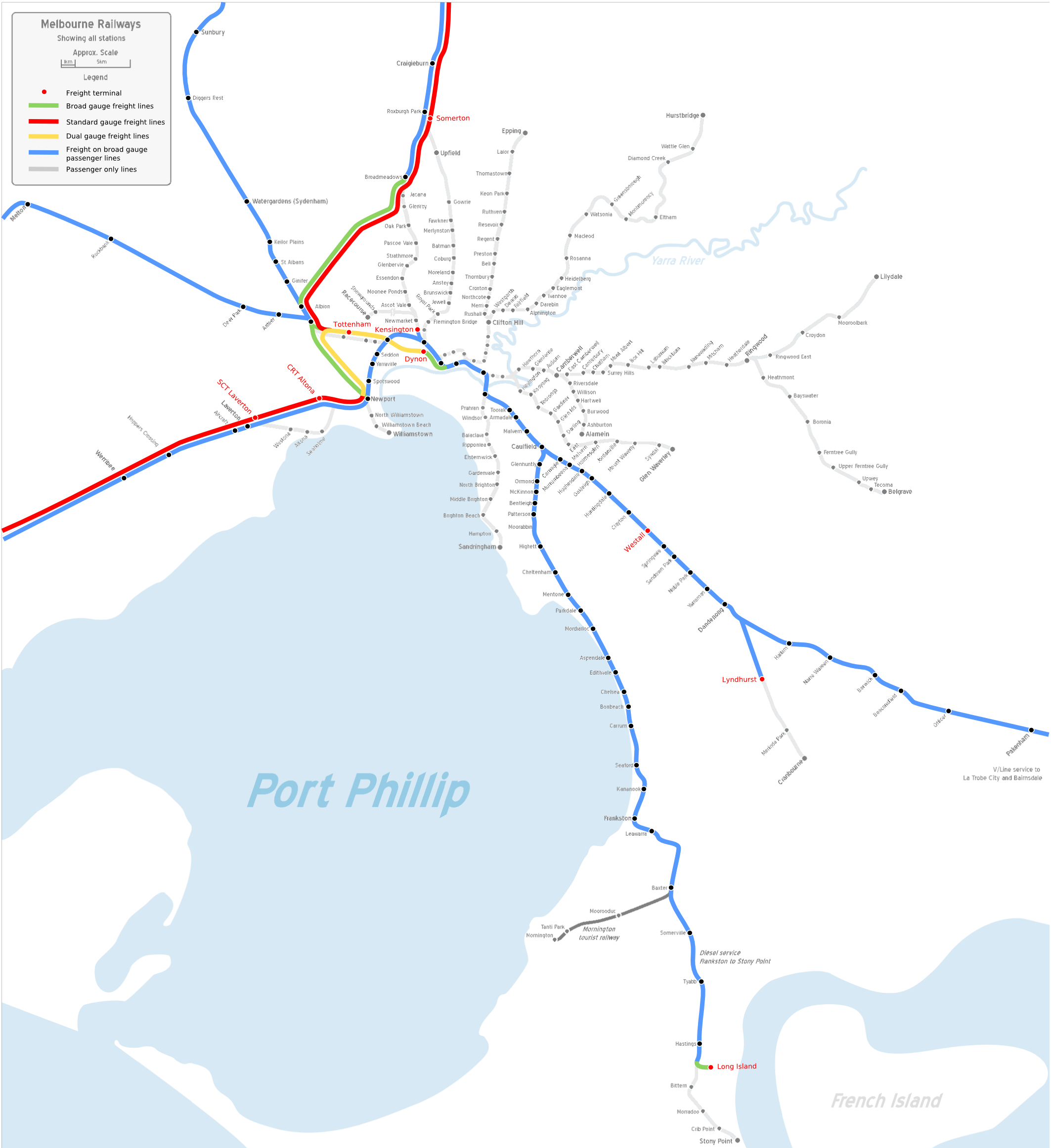

The Newport–Sunshine line is a railway line in the western suburbs of Melbourne, Australia. Linking Newport station on the Werribee line to Sunshine station on the Sunbury line, it is primarily a freight line with no overhead wires, passenger stations or platforms but The Overland passenger service between Melbourne and Adelaide also uses this route.

== History ==
The line was opened on 24 September 1887 to permit freight trains from the western and northern areas of Victoria (Australia) to access the then important port at Williamstown, Victoria. It was 4.29 miles long and is also known as the Brooklyn Loop line, for the former intermediate signal box on the line. Initially, it was not possible for trains to run from Brooklyn into Melbourne via Tottenham. A connection from the line to Tottenham Yard opened on 15 February 1965.

Between Newport and Brooklyn, the line was provided with bidirectional double-track lines. By the 1930s, a number of private sidings were opened off the line to serve adjacent industries. Today, the majority of them have closed. In 1995, the East Line was converted to dual gauge as part of the standardization of the Melbourne–Adelaide railway.

== Line guide ==
From inner Melbourne, access to the line is via the South Kensington–West Footscray freight line under Footscray station. The main line runs as dual gauge from Tottenham Junction on the North East standard gauge line, crosses the suburban Sunbury line on a bridge, until it reaches Brooklyn where a single broad gauge from Sunshine station joins. From here, parallel broad and dual gauge tracks run to Newport, where they merge and run behind Newport station, with the broad gauge joining the Werribee line and the standard gauge continuing as the Western standard gauge line alongside.

Standard gauge in blue, dual gauge in teal, broad gauge in red.
