= West Footscray railway station =

Railway station in Melbourne, Australia

West Footscray
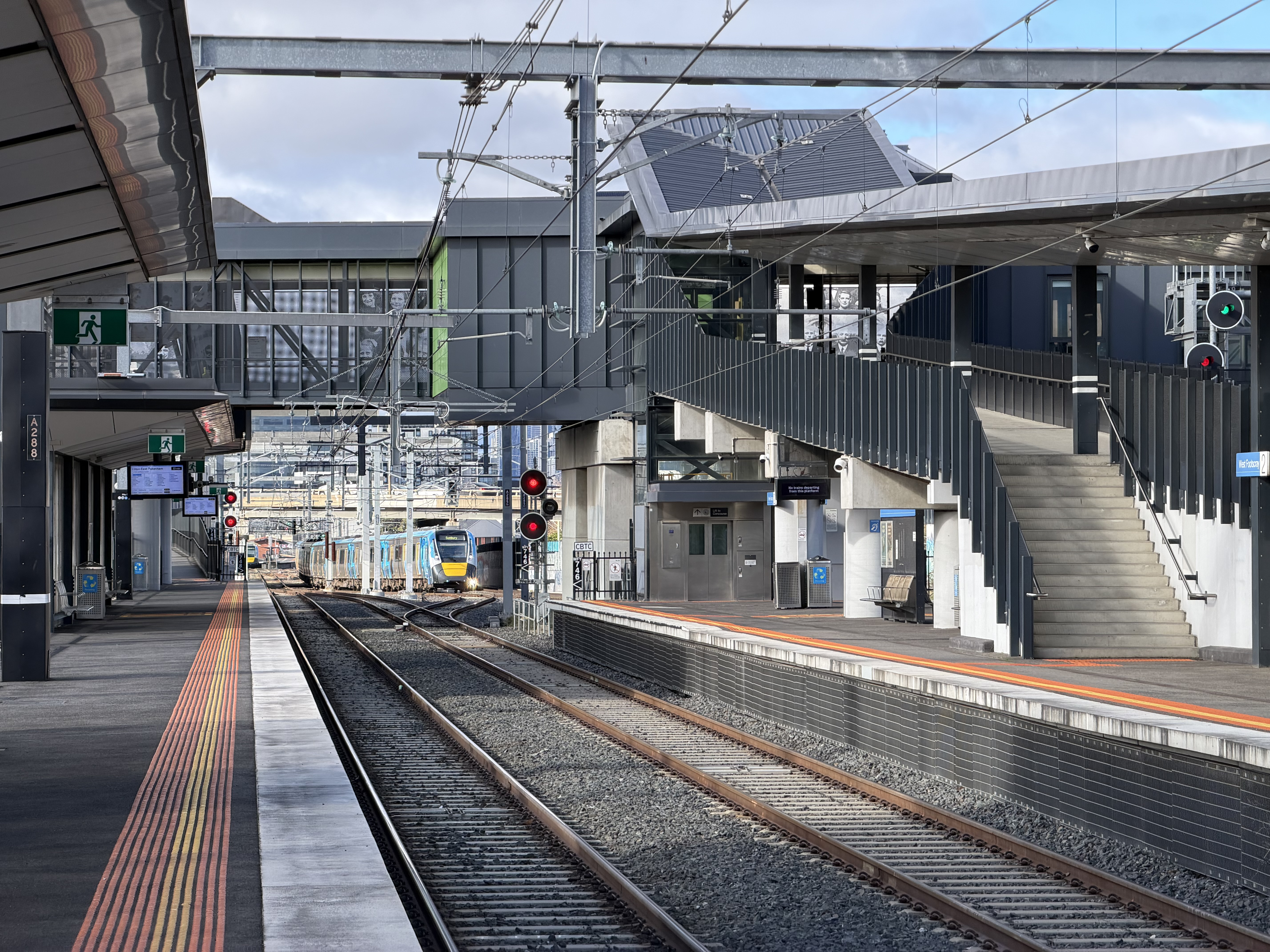
- Eastbound view from Platform 1, June 2026

General information
- Location: Sunshine Road, West Footscray, Victoria 3012; City of Maribyrnong; Australia
- Coordinates: 37°48′06″S 144°53′07″E
- System: PTV commuter rail station
- Owner: VicTrack
- Operator: Metro Trains
- Line: Sunbury
- Distance: 7.33 kilometres from Southern Cross
- Platforms: 3 (1 island, 1 side)
- Tracks: 7
- Connections: Bus

Construction
- Structure type: Ground
- Platform levels: 2 (ground floor and elevated pedestrian footbridge connecting all platforms)
- Parking: Yes
- Cycle facilities: Yes
- Accessible: Yes—step-free access

Other information
- Status: Operational, unstaffed
- Station code: WFY
- Fare zone: Myki zone 1
- Website: Public Transport Victoria

History
- Opened: 1 October 1888; 138 years ago
- Rebuilt: 1976; 14 October 2013; 6 July 2020
- Electrified: October 1921 (1500 V DC overhead)
- Former names: Footscray West (1888–1912)

Passengers
- 2005–2006: 300,313
- 2006–2007: 336,312 ▲11.98%
- 2007–2008: 351,421 ▲4.49%
- 2008–2009: 392,650 ▲11.73%
- 2009–2010: 398,015 ▲1.36%
- 2010–2011: 426,490 ▲7.15%
- 2011–2012: 355,557 ▼16.63%
- 2012–2013: Not measured
- 2013–2014: 448,029 ▲26%
- 2014–2015: 596,277 ▲33.08%
- 2015–2016: 671,539 ▲12.62%
- 2016–2017: 734,860 ▲9.42%
- 2017–2018: 751,584 ▲2.27%
- 2018–2019: 733,050 ▼2.46%
- 2019–2020: 515,950 ▼29.61%
- 2020–2021: 213,500 ▼58.62%
- 2021–2022: 283,750 ▲32.9%

Services
Preceding station	Metro Trains	Following station
Middle Footscray towards Cranbourne or East Pakenham via Metro Tunnel	Sunbury line	Terminus
Middle Footscray towards Cranbourne or East Pakenham via Metro Tunnel	Sunbury line	Tottenham towards Watergardens or Sunbury
Track layout
Location

West Footscray is a railway station operated by Metro Trains Melbourne on the Sunbury line, part of the Melbourne rail network. It serves the western suburb of West Footscray, in Melbourne, Victoria, Australia. West Footscray station is a ground-level unstaffed station, featuring three platforms, an island platform with two faces and one side platform, accessible by a pedestrian footbridge. It opened on 1 October 1888, with the current island platform provided in 2013 and the current side platform provided in 2020.

Initially opened as Footscray West, the station was changed to West Footscray on 1 September 1912.

Two dual gauge tracks run to the north of the station, forming the South Kensington – West Footscray freight line, which links the Port of Melbourne and other freight terminals to the rest of the state. The tracks also form part of the Melbourne – Sydney and Melbourne – Adelaide standard gauge lines. Two Regional Rail Link tracks run to the south of the station.

== History ==
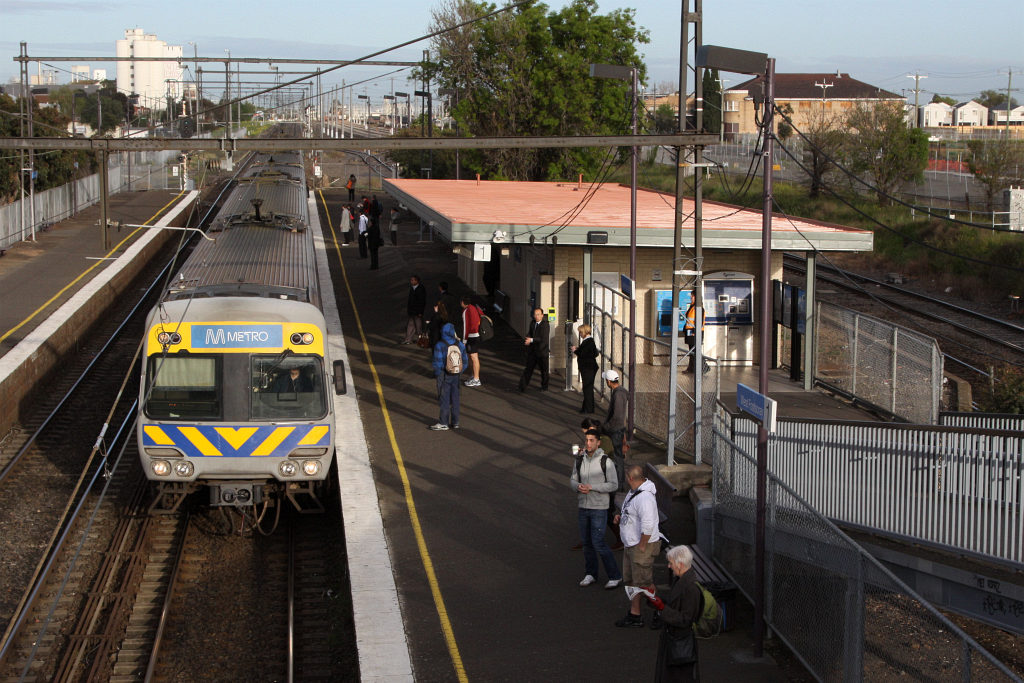
Westbound view of the now demolished station from the concourse, with a Comeng train arriving on Platform 1, September 2010

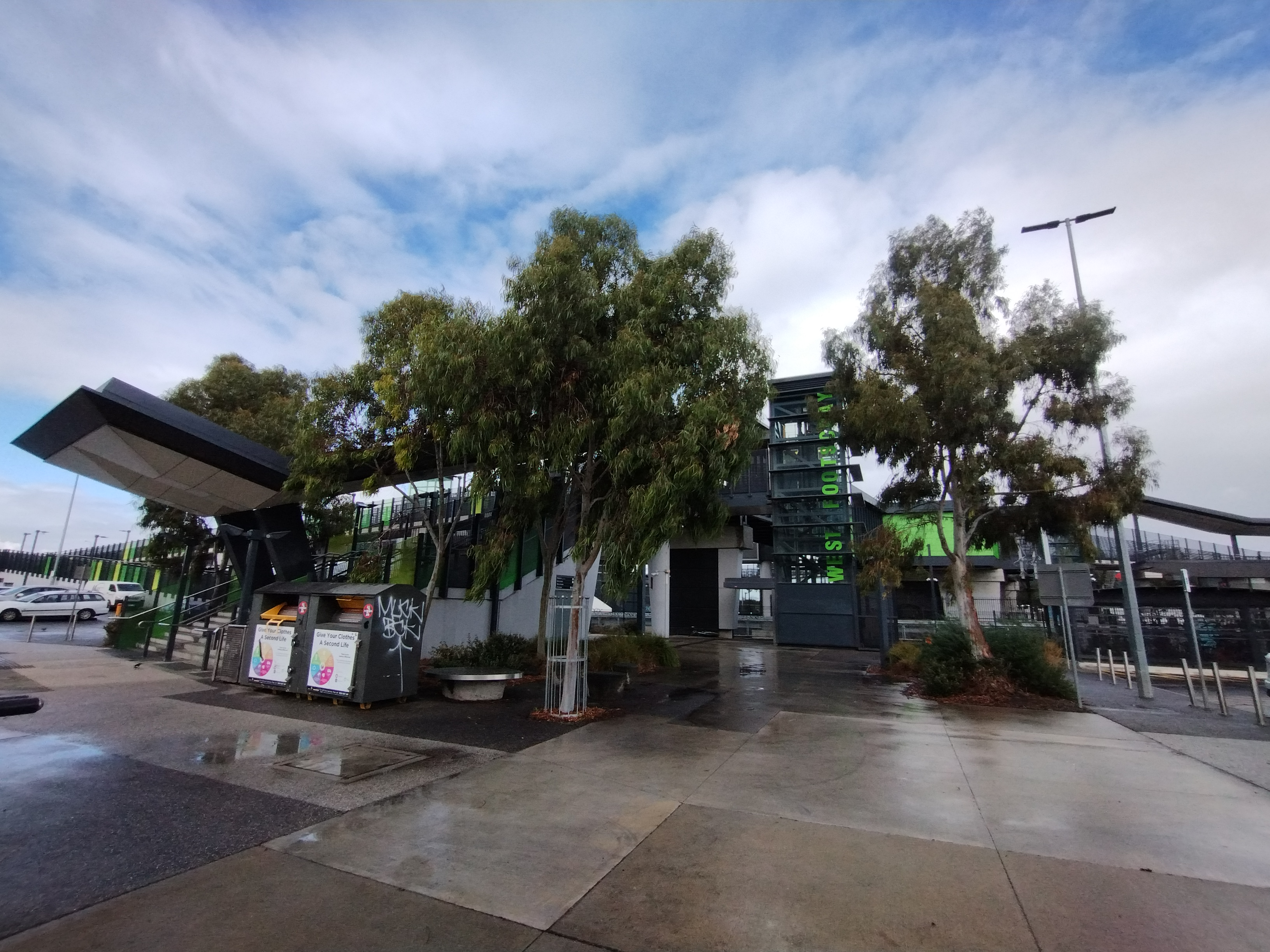
West Footscray railway station concourse and entrance viewed from the north, June 2023

In 1921, a crossover at the up (city) end of the station was abolished and removed. This crossover was located in the Geelong Road level crossing. In 1927 work began on an overpass. To allow construction works, a temporary level crossing was provided and was used until the completion of the overpass in 1928.

On 21 October 1928, the Independent Goods Line was commissioned between South Kensington and West Footscray, the independent goods line was built to separate passengers services from freight services. As well as a new goods line, a new freight yard was built, Tottenham Yard spans the distance from West Footscray towards Tottenham it opened in 1929.

In 1976, the original station buildings were demolished, and replaced with brick structures. In 2013, the station was rebuilt 200 metres further west, to accommodate two lines to the south as part of the Regional Rail Link project. On 14 October of that year, the new station opened, and the old station was demolished soon after.

A third platform has been built to the north of the existing island platform, as part of the Metro Tunnel project, to allow services to terminate and return. Work commenced in late 2018 and the new platform was opened on 6 July 2020.

== Platforms, facilities and services ==
West Footscray has one island platform with two faces and one side platform. It is served by Sunbury line trains, but express services do not stop there. Upon the opening of the Metro Tunnel in 2025, a number of services will terminate here using Platform 2. Access to the platforms is provided by stairs, lifts and ramps from an overhead footbridge, which also includes a cycling path.

=== Current ===
West Footscray platform arrangement
Platform	Line	Destination	Via	Service Type	Notes	Source
1	Sunbury line	Westall, Dandenong, East Pakenham or Cranbourne	Town Hall	Limited express services	Services to Westall and Dandenong only operate during weekday peaks	
2	Sunbury line	Westall, Dandenong, East Pakenham or Cranbourne	Town Hall	Limited express services	Services to Westall and Dandenong only operate during weekday peaks	
3	Sunbury line	Watergardens or Sunbury		All stations and limited express services		

== Transport links ==
CDC Melbourne operates three bus routes via West Footscray station, under contract to Public Transport Victoria:

- 411 : Laverton station – Footscray
- 412 : Laverton station – Footscray
- 414 : Laverton station – Footscray station

Transit Systems Victoria operates two routes via West Footscray station, under contract to Public Transport Victoria:

- 472 : Williamstown – Moonee Ponds Junction
- Night Bus 947 : Footscray – Newport station (Saturday and Sunday mornings only)
