= Freight railways in Melbourne =

Australian rail network

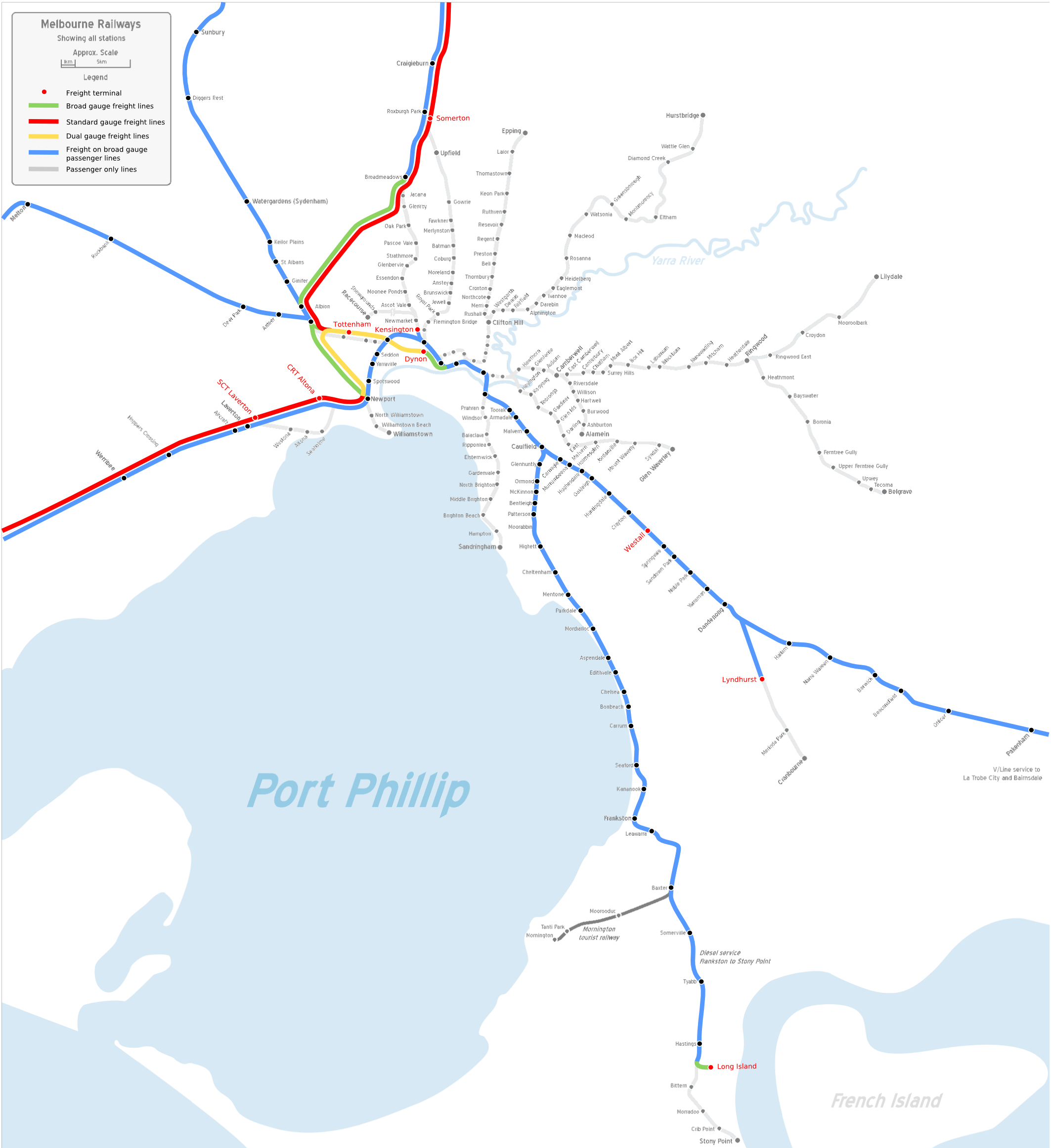
Map showing broad gauge (green), standard gauge (red) and dual gauge (yellow) dedicated freight lines, as well as broad gauge lines shared by passenger and freight traffic (blue)

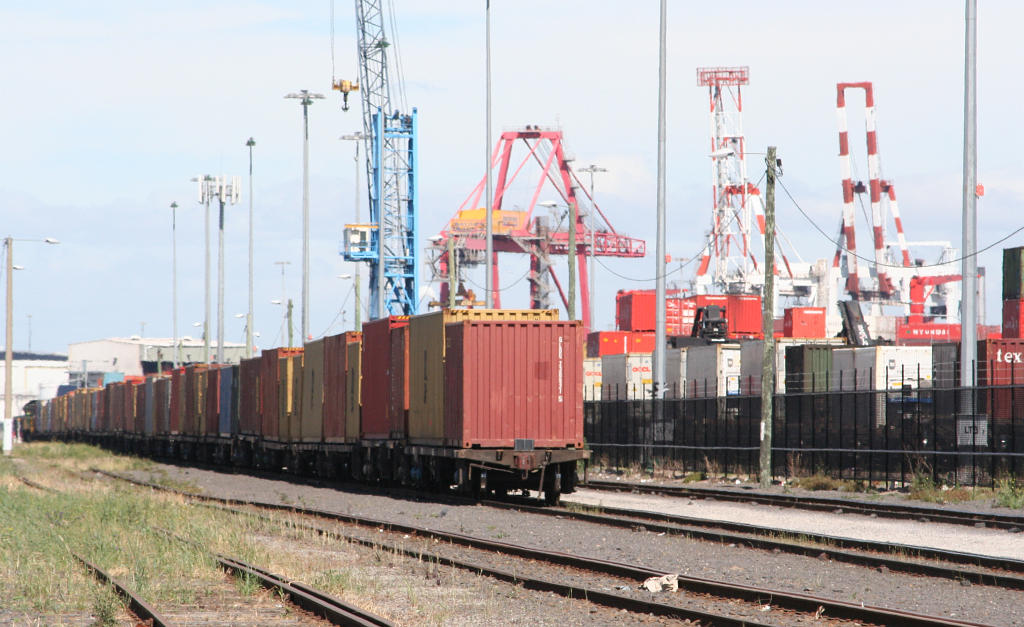
The Port of Melbourne is at the centre of the Melbourne freight network, and is the destination for many services operating through the metropolitan area

The rail network of Melbourne, Australia, has a significant number of railway lines and yards serving freight traffic. Rail transport in Victoria is heavily focused on Melbourne, and, as a consequence, much of the state's rail freight passes through the metropolitan network.

The lines are of two gauges: 1,600 mm (5 ft 3 in) Victorian broad gauge and 1,435 mm (4 ft 8 1/2 in) standard gauge. Because the standard gauge lines were developed to facilitate interstate freight decades after the establishment of the original broad gauge network, they are used almost exclusively by freight services; while some broad gauge lines are used exclusively for freight, but many are shared with the suburban and regional passenger networks operated by Metro Trains Melbourne and V/Line respectively.

Although a limited number of electric freight services historically operated in the metropolitan area, a lack of electrical infrastructure on Victorian mainlines means that no freight services in Melbourne now use electric traction, despite some services operating over the electrified passenger network.

Fixed infrastructure, such as track, signals and yards, is largely owned, operated and maintained by government agencies or in the metro area a franchisee to the government. However, all freight services are run by private operators, and some sidings and intermodal facilities are under their control.

== Ownership and operators ==
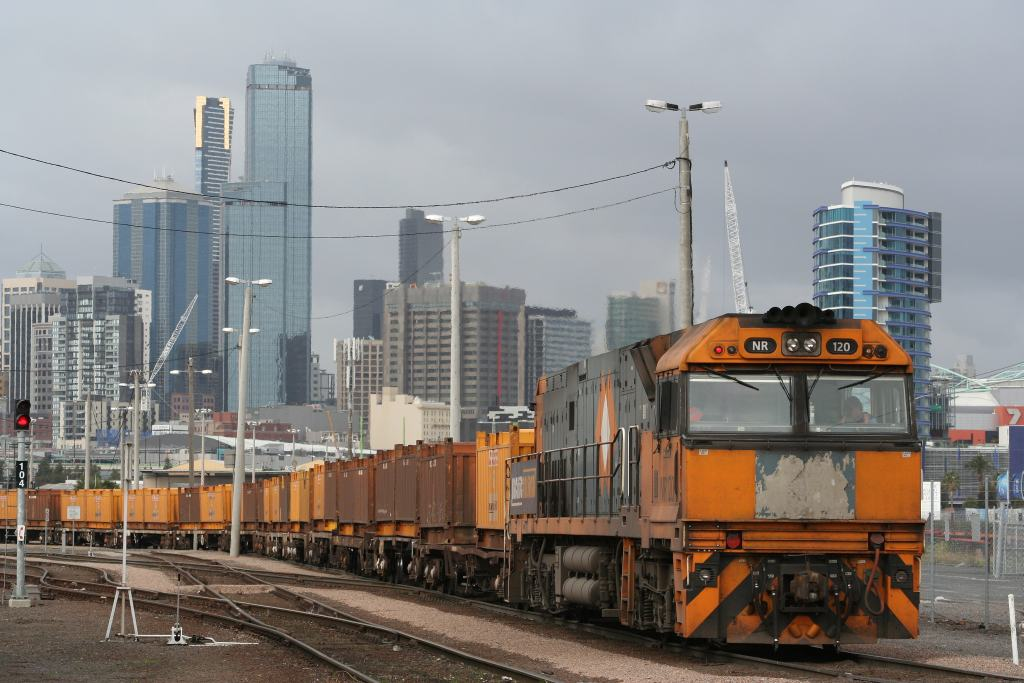
NR class locomotive at the Melbourne Steel Terminal

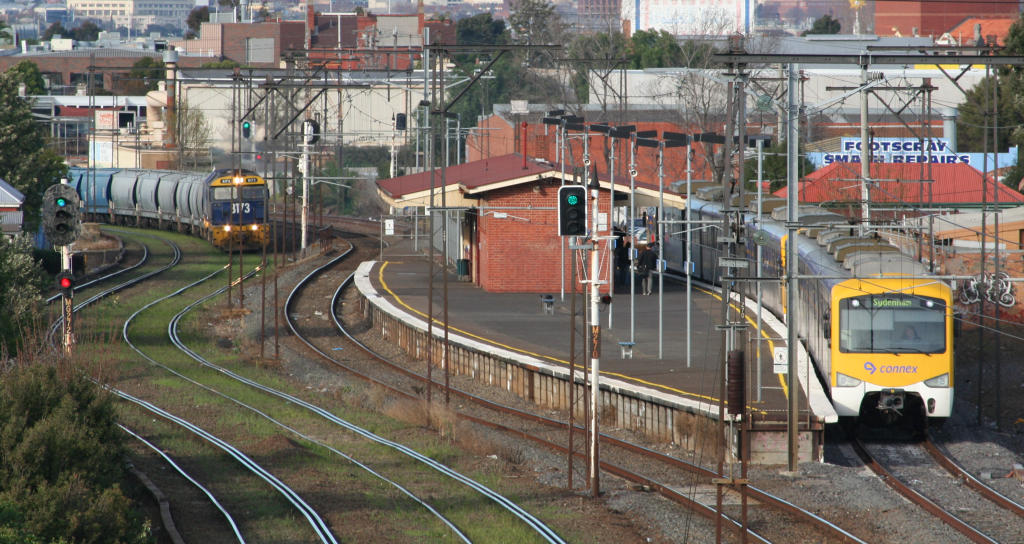
Freight and Connex services pass at Middle Footscray

Freight traffic in Victoria is divided into two main segments: interstate freight on standard gauge, and intrastate freight on broad gauge.

All track is owned by VicTrack, but is leased to and managed by differing organisations. The broad gauge lines were leased to Freight Victoria in 1999 as part of the privatisation of the rail network. Pacific National bought Freight Australia in August 2004 and in May 2007 the lease and management of the track was sold to V/Line. The interstate standard gauge lines are leased and managed by the Australian Rail Track Corporation.

Freight terminals are mainly leased from VicTrack or owned outright by private operators. There are also a number of 'common user' terminals managed by VicTrack, which are open to any freight operator.

On the broad gauge, the main freight operator is Pacific National, as well as Qube Logistics and Southern Shorthaul Railroad. On the standard gauge, operations are more varied, with trains run by the aforementioned operators, as well as SCT Logistics.

== Services ==
=== Standard gauge ===
The heaviest freight traffic is intermodal services carrying shipping containers to Sydney and Adelaide, and then on to the rest of the country. These services operate from the South Dynon, North Dynon, Appleton Dock, and Swanson Dock terminals. Steel trains for OneSteel and BlueScope operate from their mills in South Australia and New South Wales, to the Melbourne Steel Terminal in the inner city, where some of the cargo is transferred to broad gauge trains. Vanload freight to Adelaide and Perth is carried by trains operated by SCT Logistics from their own terminal in Laverton. Finally, grain trains operate into Melbourne, discharging at the Appleton Dock export terminal at the Port of Melbourne.

=== Broad gauge ===
Broad gauge freight traffic has declined since the purchase of Freight Victoria by Pacific National. Notable services running through Melbourne include:

- Long Island goods: carries steel products between the BlueScope works at Long Island on the Stony Point line and the Melbourne Steel Terminal. Typically runs four services per day, down to Long Island around midday and midnight, and up shortly before the first passenger service of the morning and in the mid-afternoon.
- Maryvale paper train: runs from the terminal at Dynon and carries containerised paper products to and from the Australian Paper mill at Maryvale.
- Kensington and Sunshine grain trains: run from Tottenham Yard to the respective silos.
- Apex train: carries quarry products from the Apex quarries at Kilmore East to users at Westall and Geelong.
- Warrnambool goods train: carries containerised goods, primarily milk powder, aluminium ingots and refrigerated meat, from Dennington to Dynon for export from the Port of Melbourne.
- Mildura Fruit Flyer goods train: carries containerised goods, primarily agricultural produce, from Merbein to Dynon for export from the Port of Melbourne.
- Tocumwal goods train: carries containerised goods, primarily agricultural produce, from Tocumwal to Dynon for export from the Port of Melbourne.

== Dedicated lines ==
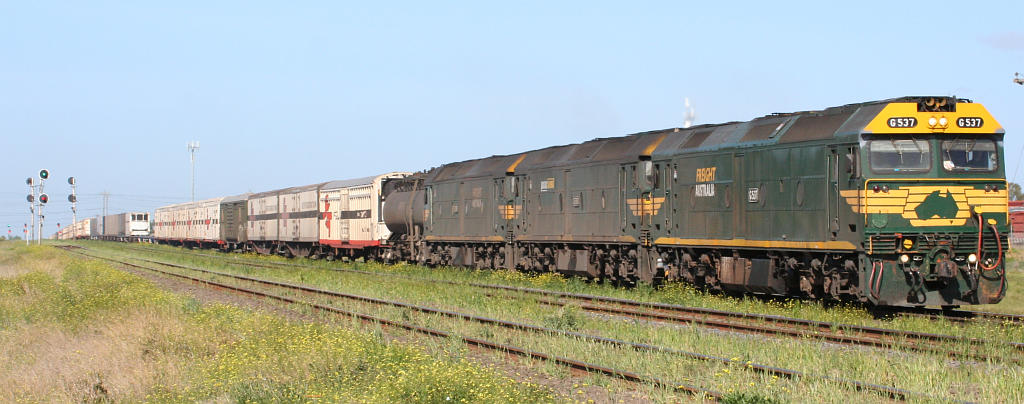
Specialised Container Transport train on the Western standard gauge line at Geelong

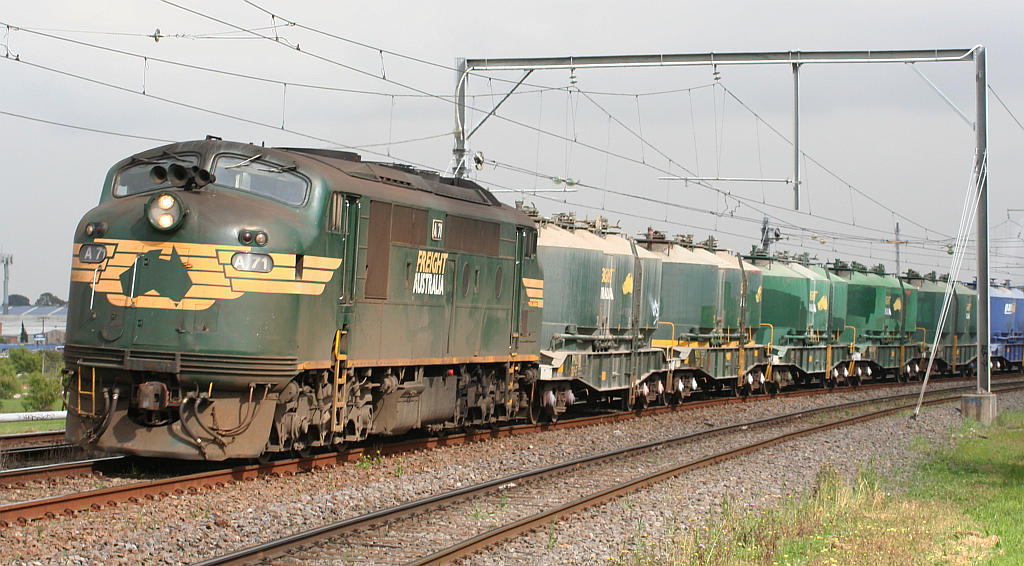
The Waurn Ponds-Lyndhurst cement train, running on the suburban lines at Newport

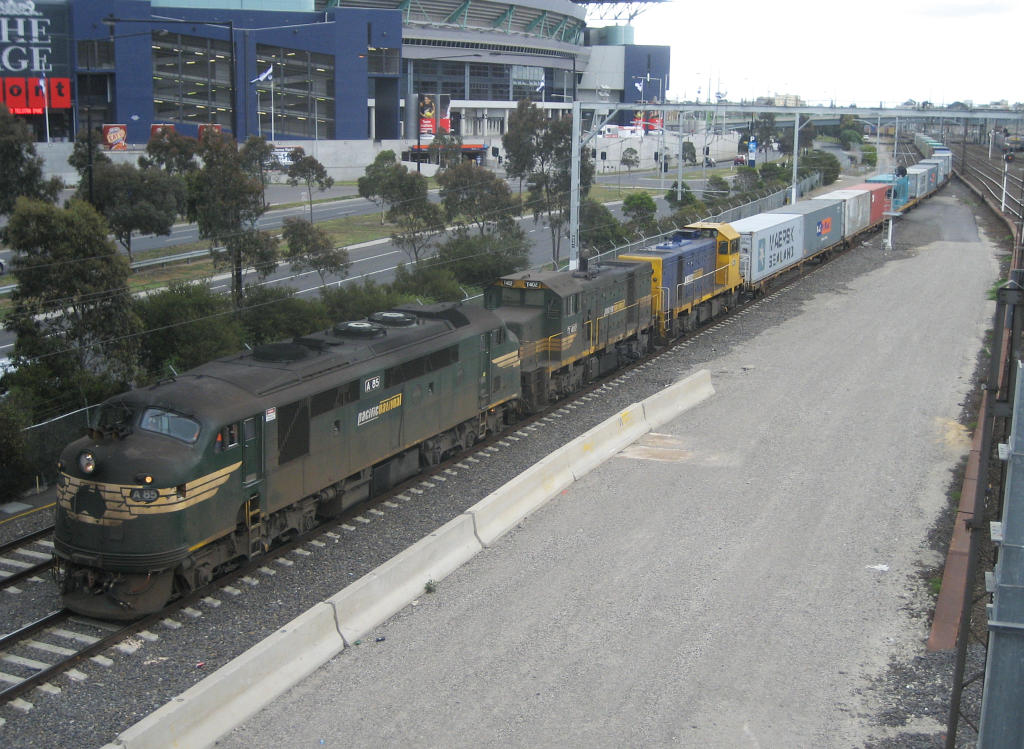
The Maryvale paper train running through Southern Cross station in the inner city

On the freight rail network there are a number of dedicated lines for freight traffic. These lines link the outer suburbs of Melbourne to the various freight terminals in the inner suburbs. The first of these lines was built in 1887, the last was built in 1929.

The only passenger traffic using these lines are V/Line services to Albury, the less frequent NSW TrainLink XPT to Sydney, and Great Southern Rail's The Overland, as well as V/Line services in times of disruptions to normal services. The interfaces between the freight and passenger networks are limited, meaning delays to one do not affect another.

=== Newport to Sunshine line ===
The Newport to Sunshine line was opened on 24 September 1887 to permit freight trains from the western and northern areas of Victoria to access the then-important port at Williamstown. 4.29 miles (6.90 km) in length, it is also known as the Brooklyn Loop line, for the intermediate signal box on the line. Passenger platforms have never been provided along the line.

Between Newport and Brooklyn the line was provided with bidirectional double track lines. By the 1930s, a number of private sidings were opened off the line to serve adjacent industries. Today the majority of them have closed. In 1995, the east line was converted to dual gauge as part of the standardisation of the railway between Melbourne and Adelaide.

=== Albion to Jacana line ===
The Albion to Jacana line opened on 1 July 1929 to allow freight trains to avoid the steeper grades and busy suburban traffic on the Broadmeadows line via Essendon. Built as double track, two major steel viaducts were required to cross the Maribyrnong River and Moonee Ponds Creek valleys. In 1962, the east line was converted to standard gauge as part of the Melbourne to Sydney gauge standardisation project.

=== South Kensington to West Footscray line ===
The South Kensington-West Footscray railway line opened on 21 October 1928 to permit freight trains to avoid Footscray station through the construction of the Bunbury Street tunnel underneath Footscray and additional tracks though West Footscray.

Built as double track, both lines were converted to dual gauge in 1962 as part of the Melbourne to Sydney gauge standardisation project. The city end of the line connects to the various freight terminals at the Port of Melbourne, and the former Melbourne Yard. The country end is connected to Tottenham Yard, as well as the Newport to Sunshine and Albion to Jacana freight lines.

=== North East line ===
The North East line links Melbourne to Albury, and then onto the rest of the standard gauge network across Australia. From Broadmeadows, the line runs parallel to the Seymour line. Constructed from the late 1950s to eliminate the break-of-gauge at Albury for Melbourne to Sydney rail traffic, the first standard gauge freight in Victoria ran on this line on 3 January 1963. Once traversed by the Intercapital Daylight, Southern Aurora and Spirit of Progress, today the only non-freight service to operate on this line are the NSW TrainLink XPT to Sydney and V/Line passenger services to Albury.

=== Western standard gauge line ===
The Western standard gauge line was completed in 1995, linking Melbourne to Adelaide and replacing the former broad gauge route. The project was funded as part of the federal government One Nation project.

The line runs along the Newport to Sunshine line, then parallel to the Geelong line to North Shore, onto dual gauge tracks towards Ballarat, then onto its own towards Ararat. From here, the original interstate route was gauge converted. The only passenger service on this line is the twice weekly Great Southern Railway The Overland.

== Shared lines ==
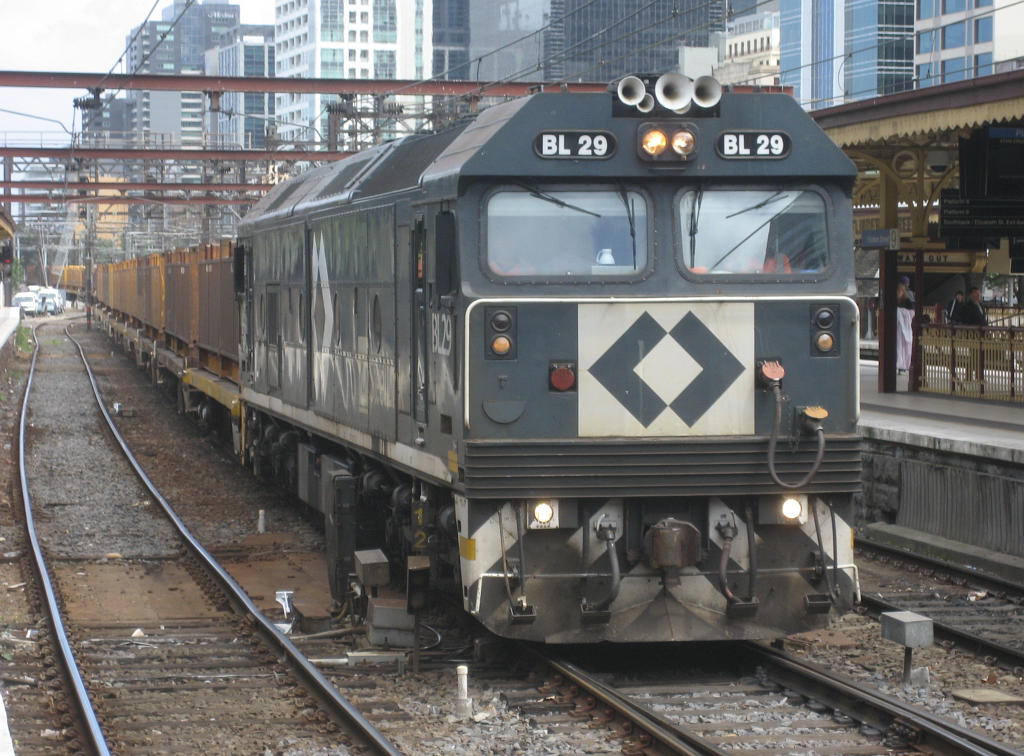
The Long Island freight train running through Flinders Street station

Where dedicated lines do not exist, intrastate broad gauge freight trains are required to share tracks with Metro Trains Melbourne suburban and V/Line regional services. Freight trains are timetabled off-peak around passenger services, and are often required to wait at freight terminals if they miss their assigned time. Regularly used lines include:

- Werribee lines towards Melbourne, until Newport
- Ballarat and Bendigo / Sunbury lines and towards Melbourne, until Sunshine
- Albury / Craigieburn lines towards Melbourne, until Broadmeadows
- Bairnsdale / Pakenham lines for the entire length to Flinders Street
- Frankston line for the entire length to Flinders Street, and the Stony Point line from Long Island Junction

In the inner city, freight trains are routed via the westernmost lines at Southern Cross station, the double track (newest) of the Flinders Street Viaduct, and the southern tracks at Flinders Street station.

== Terminals and yards ==
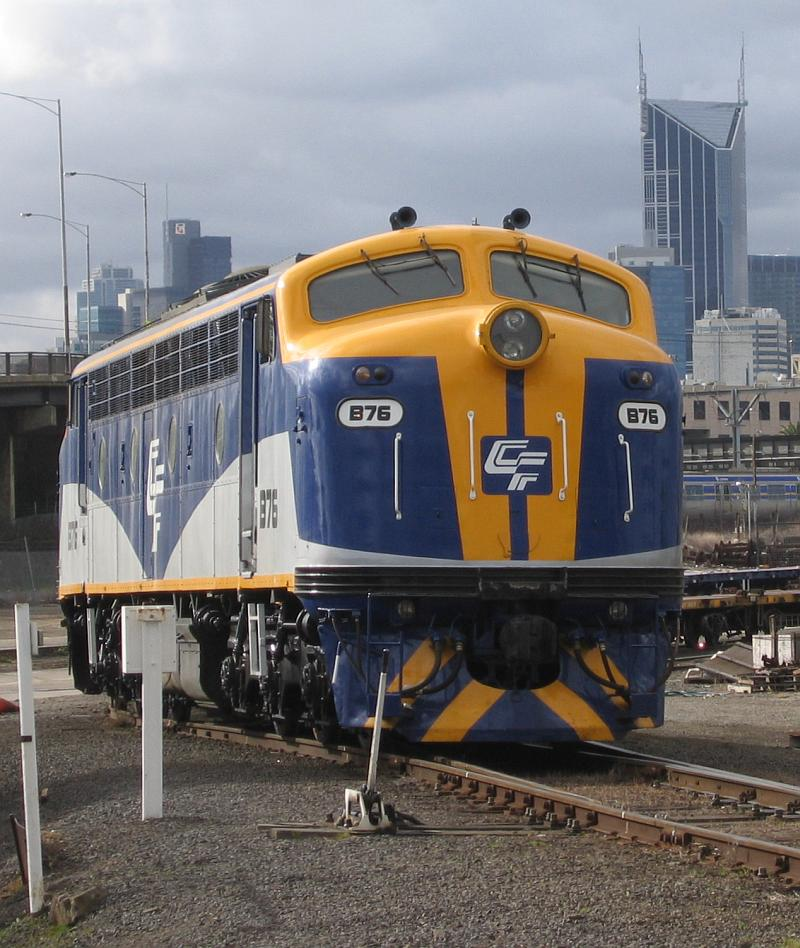
A Chicago Freight Car Leasing Australia B class diesel locomotive at the Creek Sidings

The majority of the rail terminals and yards are clustered about the Port of Melbourne and Dynon. A number of inland ports have also been established in outer suburbs, with shuttle trains running from the inner city.

=== Dynon ===
Freight terminals in the Dynon area were established from the 1950s on reclaimed swamplands between the CBD and Footscray.

The North Dynon sidings are located next to South Kensington station, and form a common user terminal. Presently, Qube trains operate from it. The terminal includes both broad gauge and standard gauge tracks.

The South Dynon complex is the main intermodal container facility in Melbourne. Located between Footscray and Dynon Roads, it is provided with standard gauge access, and is operated by Pacific National.

=== Port of Melbourne ===
Sidings serve both Swanson Dock east and west, permitting the transfer of shipping containers between sea and rail transport. Originally provided in the 1960s with the development of the port, they were later removed and not restored until 2003, when they became a 1500 metre long siding. Rail sidings at Appleton Dock reopened in 2000 to serve a new export grain terminal at the port. Dual gauge access is provided to the majority of sidings in the area.

The Westgate Ports sidings at Victoria Dock were opened in October 2009, with two siding tracks (650 and 580 metres long) and a run-around track. The sidings handles trains for Australian Paper at Maryvale in Gippsland, carrying containerised paper reels.

The Webb Dock railway line opened on 27 February 1986 to link Webb Dock with the West Melbourne rail yards but was decommissioned in 1992 due to its impractically sharp bends and to enable the development of Docklands. The Yarra River bridge crossing on the rail link was reused as a pedestrian bridge as part of Docklands precinct.

Two "Railcams" were installed by Railpage during April 2011 to digitally record all train movements in and out of the Port of Melbourne.

=== Melbourne Steel Terminal ===
The Melbourne Steel Terminal was a yard used for the transfer of steel products from standard gauge interstate trains to broad gauge trains running to the Bluescope Steel works at Long Island on the Stony Point line. Originally equipped with overhead cranes, the terminal was located at E-Gate between Footscray Road and North Melbourne. The Melbourne Steel Terminal was closed in 2015 and its functions incorporated into the South Dynon terminal.

=== Canal Yard ===
The Canal Yard or Contrans sidings were constructed by Thomas Nationwide Transport (TNT) in the 1960s for the transfer of containers between gauges. It is now used as a storage and maintenance yard by a number of small operators including El Zorro.

=== Melbourne Yard ===
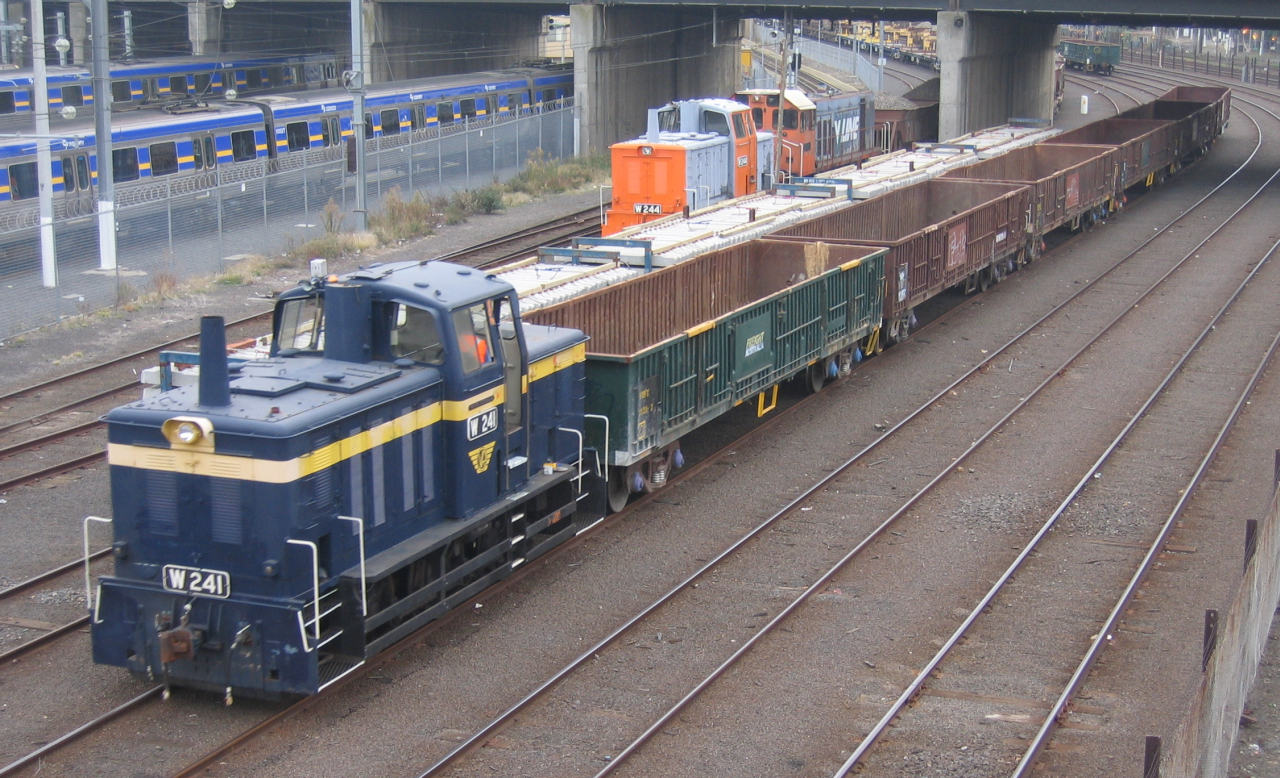
El Zorro operated works train at Melbourne Yard, next to North Melbourne station

Melbourne Yard is located to the west of the passenger lines from Southern Cross station to North Melbourne and South Kensington. It was the original freight terminal when railways were established in Victoria. Over the years the sidings spread westward towards the docks, and a number of goods sheds were erected for the unloading of freight. Congestion in the yard was reduced by the opening of Tottenham Yard in the 1920s, for the sorting of trains that were not bound for Melbourne or the eastern part of Victoria.

During the 1960s Melbourne Yard was rearranged for greater efficiency, with a hump yard opened on 9 December 1970 to assist in the marshalling of wagons. Increased containerisation of freight traffic left the yard outdated, with the Dynon complex of terminals taking over the freight task, with the hump yard last used in September 1987.

Engines Y118 and Y121 were noted working Melbourne Hump Yard at the end of September 1989, in lieu of shunting engines F211 and F212 with a comment indicating that narrower wheels must have been used to make the engines compatible with the retarding equipment used to slow individual wagons to precise speeds when rolling downhill.

The Melbourne Docklands and Docklands Stadium developments of the 1990s removed most of the sidings and goods sheds to the west of Southern Cross station. Only historic goods sheds, such as the 1889 No 2 Goods Shed, were retained, To the north of Dudley Street, a number of sidings still remain for the stabling of trains, as does the West Tower signal box.

=== Tottenham Yard ===
The land for Tottenham Yard was acquired by the Victorian Railways in 1912 as a location to dump soil and building material removed from the grade separation project between South Yarra and Caulfield stations.

Tottenham Yard was opened in the western suburb of Tottenham from the 1920s as part of a project to improve freight movement in Victoria. The majority of freight traffic in the state was from the north or western areas, and was being remarshalled into trains at Melbourne Yard. This caused inefficiencies with the large number of trains needing to enter the Melbourne city, so the yard was opened for the marshalling of trains before they were sent to Melbourne Yard.

Laid with broad gauge trackage, Tottenham is a gravitational yard with a slight slope from the Sunshine end towards the city. The yard consists of four groups of sidings: arrival roads, two groups of classification roads, and departure tracks.

in late 1986 the southernmost two tracks from the second classification yard and the departure yard were linked, with all intermediate turnouts removed, providing space to assemble fast, heavy freight trains for Adelaide.

Heavy usage of the yard ended with the gauge conversion of the main line to Adelaide in 1995, and with the decline of broad gauge traffic in general, large areas of the yard are now used for wagon storage. Tottenham station is located to the south of the yard.

=== SCT Laverton ===
SCT Logistics established a terminal at Laverton on the Western standard gauge line in the 1990s for the use of vanload freight trains operated by the company. Provided with a large number of sidings as well as both refrigerated and non-refrigerated warehouse space, trains from the terminal operate to Adelaide and Perth.

=== CRT Altona ===
The CRT Group established a terminal at Altona on the Western standard gauge line in the 1990s for the use of their company. The company was later acquired by QR National, and subsequently by Qube.

=== Miscellaneous ===
A number of other railway stations have freight facilities still in use:

- Westall
- Kensington

== Former services ==
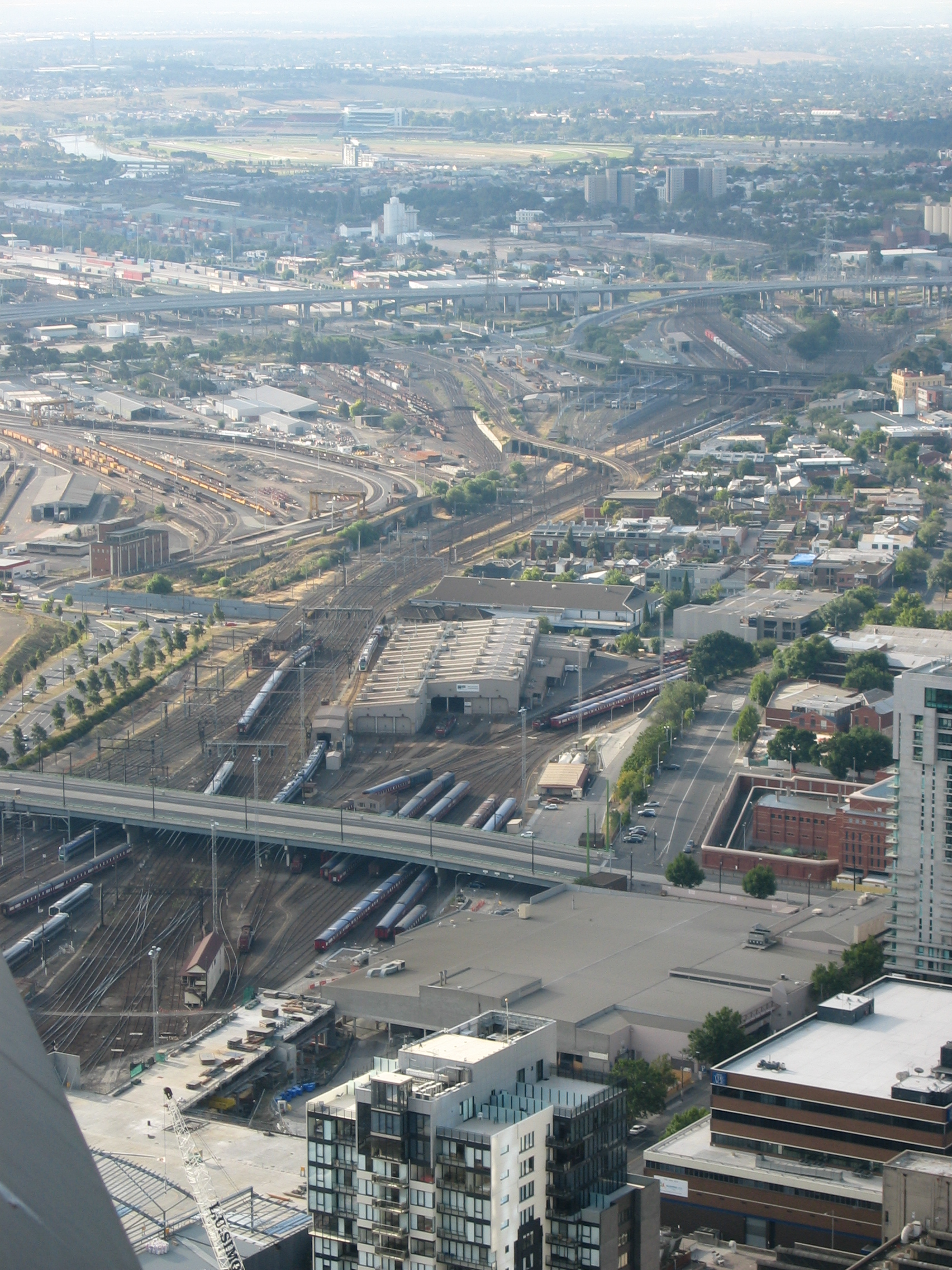
Looking north from the Melbourne CBD north west towards the Southern Cross Station carriage yards, Melbourne Yard, the Melbourne Steel Terminal, and Dynon

In the late 1920s, the Victorian Railways introduced their fleet of E class electric locomotives which operated throughout Melbourne for the next 60 years, trains operating during the off-peak and at night. As late as the 1970s, most suburban railway stations had goods yards for general freight, as well as the local distribution of huge quantities of brown coal briquettes and firewood, which were the principal forms of industrial and domestic heating. Briquette traffic peaked in 1960/61 when 1.7 million tons were moved within Victoria, second only to the wheat harvest in volume.

There were also a large number of sidings that directly served factories and other industrial facilities. With the rise of efficient door to door road transport, suburban rail freight operations ceased in the late 1980s. The majority of goods yards have since been removed and the land used for car parking, or converted to stabling locations for suburban trains.

Suburban stations with goods yards or sidings included:

- Dandenong
- Essendon
- Lilydale
- Newport
- Werribee
- Sunshine
- Broadmeadows
- Eltham
- Heidelberg
- General Motors
- Williamstown
- Laverton
- Newmarket
- Yarraville
- Spotswood (sand trains to AGM Siding near Nyora)
- Seaford
- Port Melbourne

In recent years, attempts have been made to run shuttles between the Port of Melbourne and inland ports. Between 2003 and 2006, CRT Group operated a shuttle to their terminal at Altona, 22 kilometres from the docks. In 2004/05, the service transported 13,000 TEU, this being 42 per cent capacity for import and 58 per cent for export containers. The service ceased due to high access fees charged by track operator ARTC, and delays by interstate freight trains sharing the same track making the reliable operation of two trips per day impossible. The service restarted in 2005, but failed for the same reasons. A second port shuttle has operated to the Austrack terminal at Somerton during various periods since 1998, with difficulties faced including inefficient track layouts, high rail transfer charges at the port, and inconvenient timetables dictated by long-distance freight services.

== See also ==
- Railways in Melbourne
- Rail transport in Victoria
