= Flinders Street railway station =

Railway station in Melbourne, Australia

Flinders Street
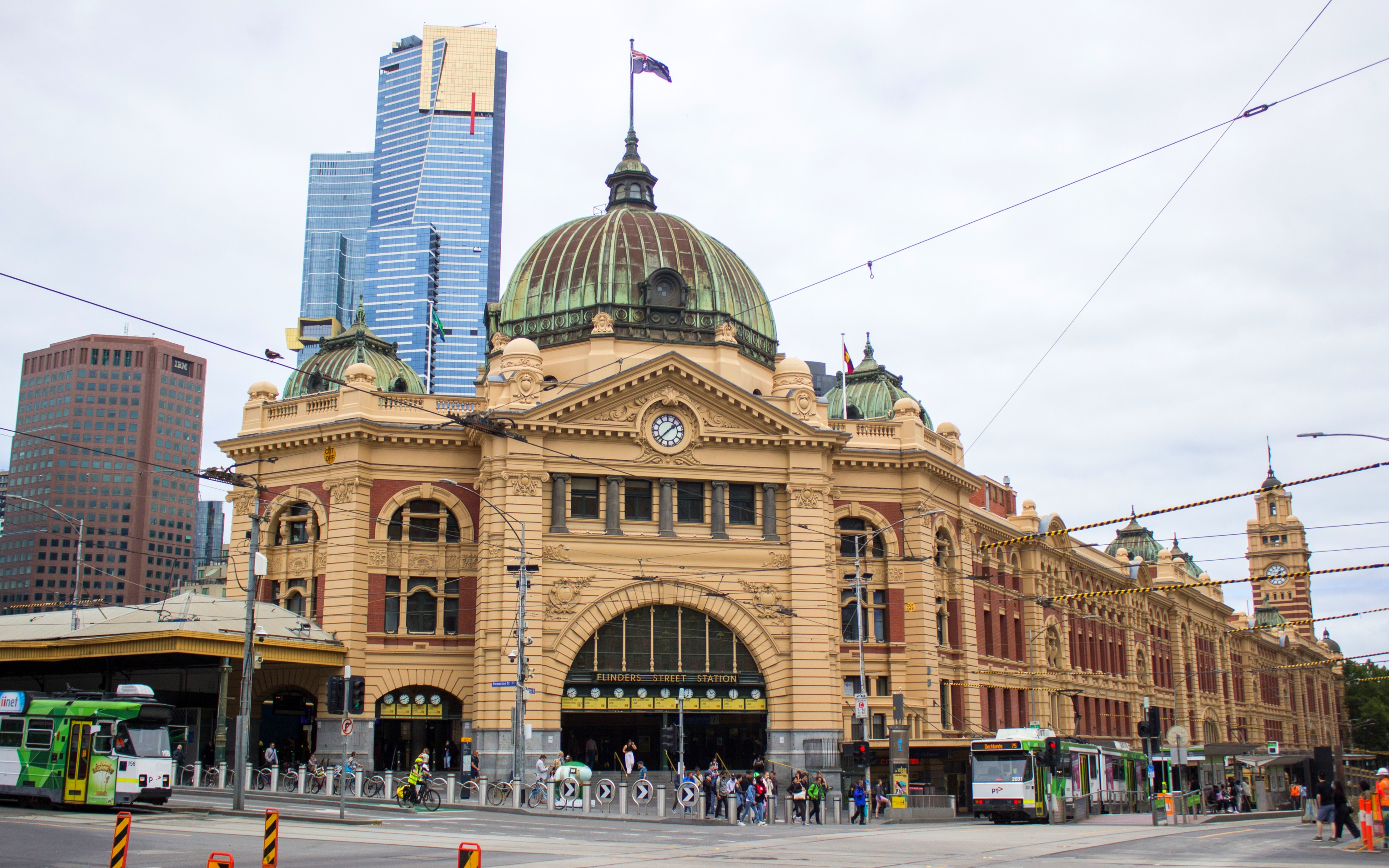
- Main entrance, corner of Flinders and Swanston Streets

General information
- Location: 207–361 Flinders Street; Melbourne, Victoria 3000; Australia
- Coordinates: 37°49′05″S 144°58′01″E
- System: PTV metropolitan and regional rail station
- Owner: VicTrack
- Operator: Metro Trains
- Lines: Mernda Hurstbridge; Lilydale Belgrave Alamein (Note: Peak only); Glen Waverley; Craigieburn Upfield; Flemington Racecourse (Note: Special events only); Frankston; Sandringham Werribee Williamstown; Gippsland
- Distance: 1.23 kilometres from Southern Cross
- Platforms: 13 (plus one removed)
- Tracks: 15
- Train operators: Metro Trains; V/Line
- Connections: Town Hall: Cranbourne Pakenham; Sunbury; Tram

Construction
- Structure type: At-grade
- Parking: None
- Cycle facilities: None
- Accessible: Yes—step free access
- Architectural style: Melbourne

Other information
- Status: Premium station
- Station code: FSS
- Fare zone: Myki zone 1
- Website: Public Transport Victoria

History
- Opened: 12 September 1854; 172 years ago
- Electrified: 28 May 1919 (1500 V DC overhead)
- Former names: Melbourne Terminus

Passengers
- 2019-2020: 21.504 million ▼24.07%
- 2020-2021: 8.528 million ▼60.34%
- 2021–2022: 11.393 million ▲33.59%
- 2022–2023: 18.793 million ▲64.96%
- 2023–2024: 20.345 million ▲8.26%
- 2024–2025: 19.633 million ▼3.5%
Services
Preceding station	Metro Trains	Following station
Direction of travel through the City Loop on metropolitan lines changes to either Southern Cross or Parliament depending on the line and time of day.
Southern Cross towards Hurstbridge or Mernda via City Loop	Hurstbridge line	Jolimont One-way operation
Southern Cross towards Hurstbridge or Mernda via City Loop	Mernda line	Jolimont One-way operation
Southern Cross towards Alamein, Belgrave, Lilydale or Glen Waverley via City Loop	Alamein line Peak only	Richmond towards Alamein, Belgrave, Lilydale or Glen Waverley
Southern Cross towards Alamein, Belgrave, Lilydale or Glen Waverley via City Loop	Belgrave line	Richmond towards Alamein, Belgrave, Lilydale or Glen Waverley
Southern Cross towards Alamein, Belgrave, Lilydale or Glen Waverley via City Loop	Lilydale line	Richmond towards Alamein, Belgrave, Lilydale or Glen Waverley
Southern Cross towards Alamein, Belgrave, Lilydale or Glen Waverley via City Loop	Glen Waverley line	Richmond towards Alamein, Belgrave, Lilydale or Glen Waverley
Southern Cross towards Craigieburn or Upfield	Craigieburn line	Parliament towards Craigieburn or Upfield via City Loop
Southern Cross towards Craigieburn or Upfield	Upfield line	Parliament towards Craigieburn or Upfield via City Loop
Southern Cross One-way operation	Frankston line	Richmond towards Frankston
Southern Cross towards Werribee or Williamstown	Werribee line	Richmond towards Sandringham
Southern Cross towards Werribee or Williamstown	Williamstown line	Richmond towards Sandringham
Southern Cross towards Werribee or Williamstown	Sandringham line	Richmond towards Sandringham
Southern Cross towards Showgrounds or Flemington Racecourse	Flemington Racecourse line	Terminus
Preceding station	V/Line	Following station
Southern Cross Terminus	Gippsland line	Richmond towards Traralgon or Bairnsdale
Transfer at Town Hall
Preceding station	Metro Trains	Following station
State Library towards Watergardens or Sunbury	Cranbourne line	Anzac towards East Pakenham or Cranbourne
State Library towards Watergardens or Sunbury	Pakenham line	Anzac towards East Pakenham or Cranbourne
State Library towards Watergardens or Sunbury	Sunbury line	Anzac towards East Pakenham or Cranbourne
Former services
Preceding station	Metro Trains	Following station
Pre 2026
Southern Cross One-way operation	Cranbourne line	Richmond towards Cranbourne or East Pakenham
Southern Cross One-way operation	Pakenham line	Richmond towards Cranbourne or East Pakenham
Southern Cross towards Watergardens or Sunbury	Sunbury line	Parliament towards Watergardens or Sunbury via City Loop
Southern Cross towards Werribee or Williamstown	Frankston line	Richmond towards Frankston
Southern Cross towards Werribee or Williamstown	Werribee line	Richmond towards Frankston
Southern Cross towards Werribee or Williamstown	Williamstown line	Richmond towards Frankston
Former lines
Preceding station	MetRail	Following station
through to Sandringham line	Port Melbourne line	Montague towards Port Melbourne
through to Sandringham line	St Kilda line	South Melbourne towards St Kilda
- Building details

General information
- Status: Completed
- Type: Railway station terminus
- Architectural style: Federation/Edwardian Period Baroque
- Elevation: 20.6 metres (68 ft) AHD
- Construction started: 1900
- Completed: 1909
- Cost: £A 514,000

Technical details
- Material: Sandstone, bluestone, granite; Copper roof; Trägerwellblech system flooring/roofing; Corrugated galvanised iron roofing; Lead glazed Edwardian Majolica plain and lettered wall tiles

Design and construction
- Architect: James W. Fawcett
- Architecture firm: Fawcett and Ashworth
- Engineer: H.P.C. Ashworth

Victorian Heritage Register
- Official name: Flinders Street Railway Station Complex
- Criteria: A, E, F, G
- Designated: 20 August 1982
- Reference no.: H1083
- Heritage Overlay number: HO649
Location

Flinders Street station is a major railway station located on the corner of Flinders and Swanston streets in Melbourne, Victoria, Australia. Located near Federation Square and St Paul's Cathedral, it is the busiest railway station in Victoria, serving the entire electrified metropolitan rail network (except the Metro Tunnel lines), 15 tram routes travelling to and from the city, and V/Line services to Gippsland.

Opened in 1854 by the Melbourne and Hobson's Bay Railway Company, the station, but not the current building, is the oldest in Australia, backing onto the Yarra River in the central business district. The complex now includes 13 platforms and structures that stretch over more than two city blocks, from east of Swanston Street west almost as far as Queen Street.

Flinders Street station is served by most Metro Trains services and V/Line regional services to Gippsland. It is the busiest station on Melbourne's metropolitan network, with an average of 77,153 daily entries recorded in the 2017/18 fiscal year. It was the terminus of the first railway in Australia (the Port Melbourne line) and was reputedly the world's busiest passenger station in the 1920s, although passenger numbers declined with a wider fall in train patronage after the Second World War and the opening of additional city stations on the City Loop – built to ease pressure on Flinders St – in the 1980s.

The main platform (operationally divided into platforms 1 and 14) is Australia's second longest, and the eighteenth-longest railway platform in the world. Trains at Flinders Street station connect with several tram services, and is the site of two of Melbourne's busiest pedestrian crossings, both across Flinders Street, including one of Melbourne's few pedestrian scrambles, at the junction with Elizabeth Street.

The current station building was completed in 1909 and is a cultural icon of Melbourne. The distinctive Edwardian building, with its prominent dome, arched entrance, tower and clocks is one of the city's most recognisable landmarks, and its grand character led to the popular myth that the design was actually intended for Mumbai's Victoria Terminus and vice versa, but was swapped in the post.

The Melbourne saying "I'll meet you under the clocks" refers to the row of indicator clocks above the main entrance, which show the next departure for each line; the alternative, "I'll meet you on the steps", refers to the wide staircase beneath the clocks.

It has been listed on the Victorian Heritage Register since 1982.

== History ==
=== Early terminus ===
The first railway station to occupy the Flinders Street site was a collection of weatherboard train sheds. It was opened on 12 September 1854 by the Lieutenant-Governor, Charles Hotham. The terminus was the first city railway station in Australia, and the opening day saw the first steam train trip in Australia. The train travelled to Sandridge (now Port Melbourne), over the since-reconstructed Sandridge Bridge and along what is now the light rail Port Melbourne line.

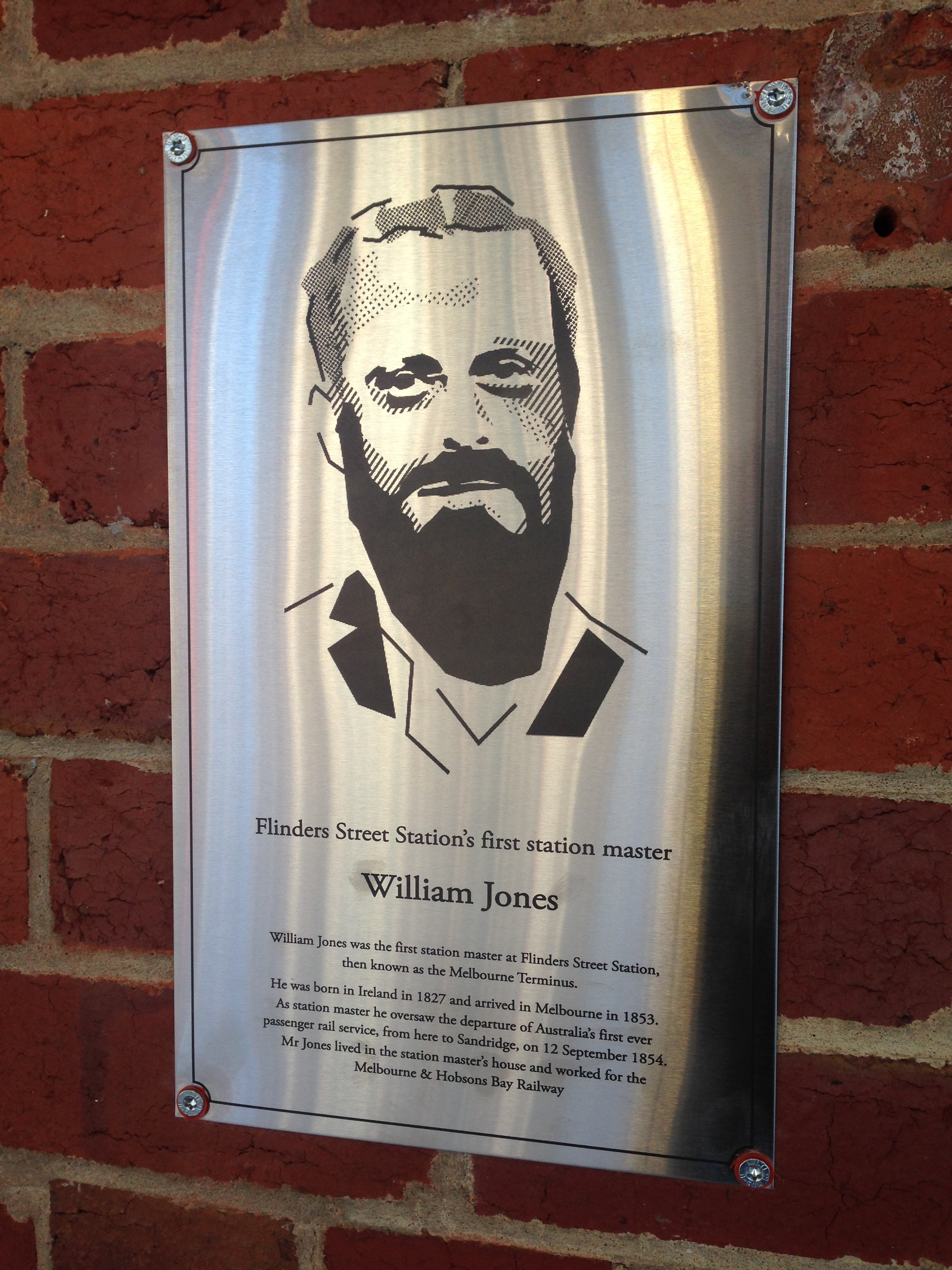
William Jones, the first stationmaster of Flinders Street

There is some confusion over the original name of the station. Leo Harrigan, in his book Victorian Railways to '62, writes that it was first named "Melbourne Terminus". Newspaper articles about the opening in September 1854 refer to "Melbourne terminus" with a lower case "t", which may have caused the misapprehension. Early tickets for the railway just show "Melbourne" as the destination. Yet H.K Atkinson, in his book Suburban Tickets of the Victorian Railways, lists the station as "Flinders Street" from its opening. Moreover, a newspaper report of December 1854 mentions that the Hobsons Bay Railway Company shareholder meeting was held at "Flinders Street Station". In all likelihood, the station was called "Melbourne, Flinders Street" from the outset, and the somewhat superfluous "Melbourne" was gradually dropped through common usage. When Prince's Bridge station opened across Swanston Street in 1859, the Flinders Street name would undoubtedly have become more prominent. The platforms for trains arriving from Station Pier retained the "Melbourne, Flinders Street" signage well into the twentieth century to minimise confusion for new visitors.

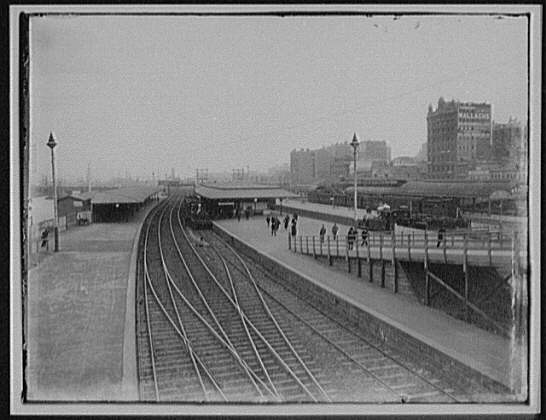
View of the platforms looking west, 1895

The first terminus had a single platform 30 metres (98 ft 5 in) long, and was located beside the Fish Market building on the south-west corner of Swanston and Flinders Streets. An additional platform was provided in 1877, along with two overhead bridges to provide passenger access, followed in 1879 by additional timber and corrugated iron buildings, and a telegraph station. The first signal boxes were opened at the station in 1883, one at each end of the platforms. By the 1890s, a third island platform had been constructed.

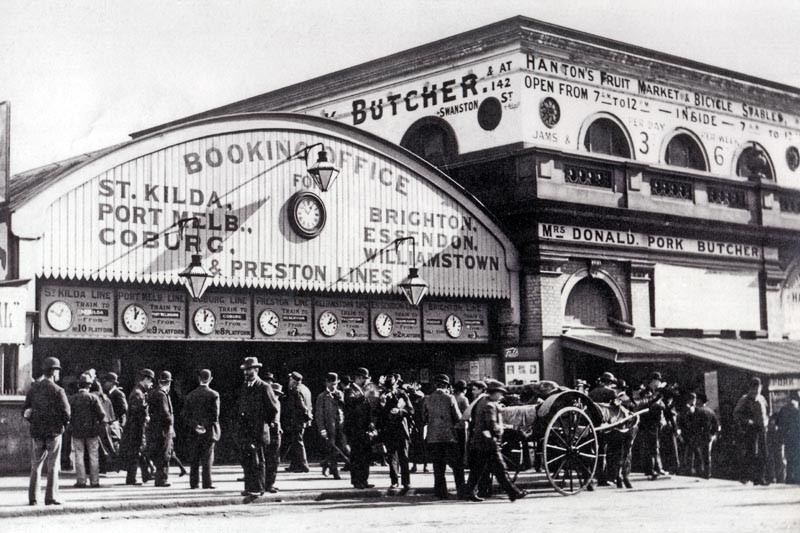
Entrance from Swanston Street, c. 1890

Melbourne's two other early central-city stations, Spencer Street and Princes Bridge, opened in 1859. Spencer Street served the lines to the west of the city, and was isolated from the eastern side of the network until a ground level railway was built connecting it to Flinders Street in 1879, this track being replaced by the Flinders Street Viaduct in 1889.

Princes Bridge station was originally separate from Flinders Street, even though it was only on the opposite side of Swanston Street. Once the railway line was extended under the street in 1865 to join the two, Princes Bridge was closed. It was reopened in April 1879, and from 1909 slowly became amalgamated into Flinders Street. Federation Square now occupies its site. Designs were prepared for a new Princes Street Station in the 1880s but not proceeded with.

=== Current building ===
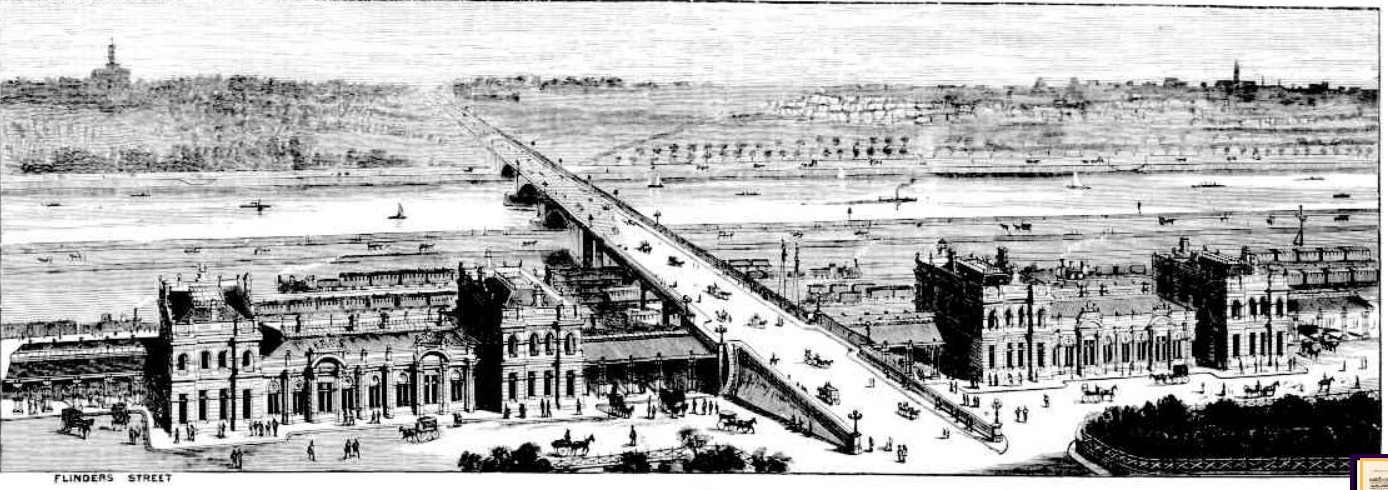
1883 design competition winner

By the 1880s, it was becoming clear that a new central passenger station was needed to replace the existing ad-hoc station buildings. A design competition was held in 1883, but the winning entry, by William Salway, featuring a pair of grandiose Italianate buildings either side of a yet-to-be-rebuilt Princes Bridge, was not built.

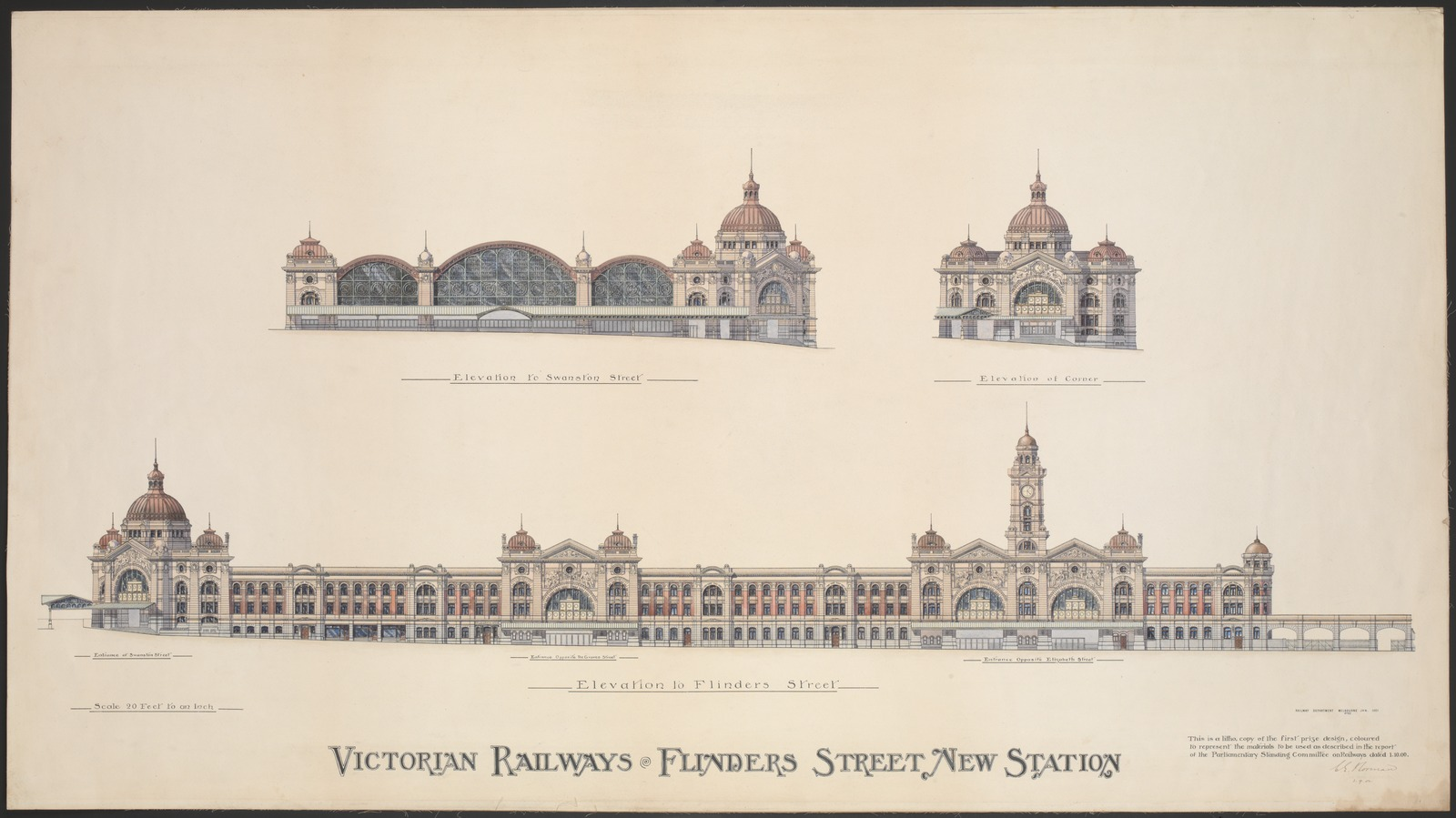
The winning design by Fawcett & Ashworth, 1899

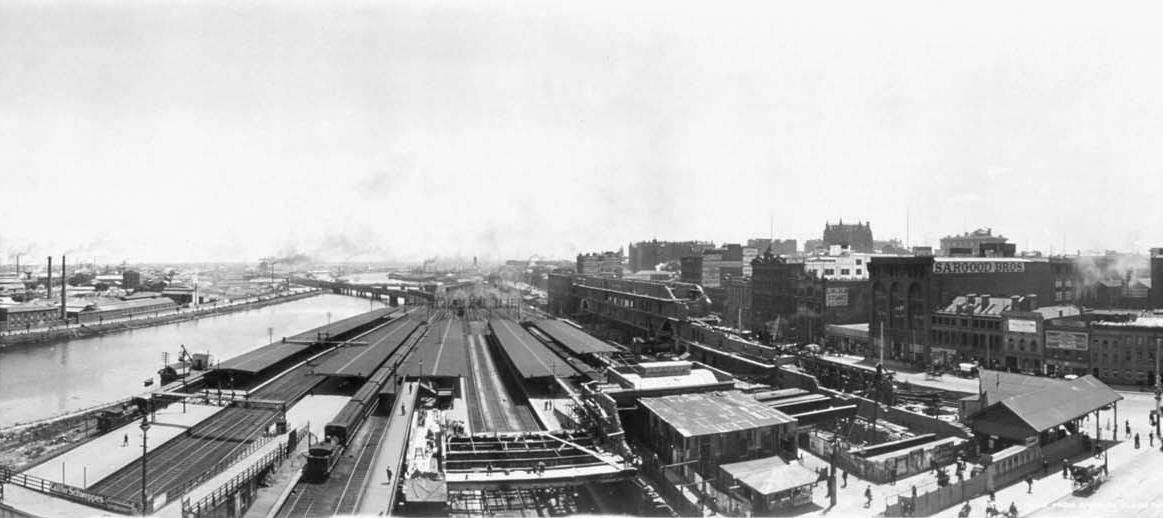
During construction, 1908

Well over a decade later, the Railway Commissioners prepared an in-house design for a new "Central Railway Station". It was published on 28 July 1898, and featured a dome on the corner and a clocktower at the Elizabeth Street end, and a large train shed roof over all the platforms. The Railways Standing Committee of the state parliament accepted the track and platform layout, the location of the concourse and entrances, and even the room layout to some extent, and recommended that it be funded. However, they were not satisfied with the architectural design, asking in April 1899 for a design competition "for the frontage"', with a closing date of August 1899. 17 entries were received, and the winners were announced on 28 May 1900.

The £500 first prize was awarded to railway employees James Fawcett and H. P. C. Ashworth (Fawcett and Ashworth), whose design, named Green Light, was described as being in the French Renaissance style. Like the Commissioners' design, it included a large dome over the main entrance, a tall clock tower over the Elizabeth Street entrance, an entrance opposite Degraves Street, and two subways. There was to be a train shed roof of corrugated iron over the platforms "supported by 12 columns", with minimal amounts of glass to protect against the summer sun (drawings of that have not survived). The Swanston Street elevation does survive, and shows an impressive three-arched roof running east–west, with a tall stained glass east end, which most likely was only to cover the concourse. The roof over the platforms may have been a similar arrangement of arches but across the lines rather than parallel.

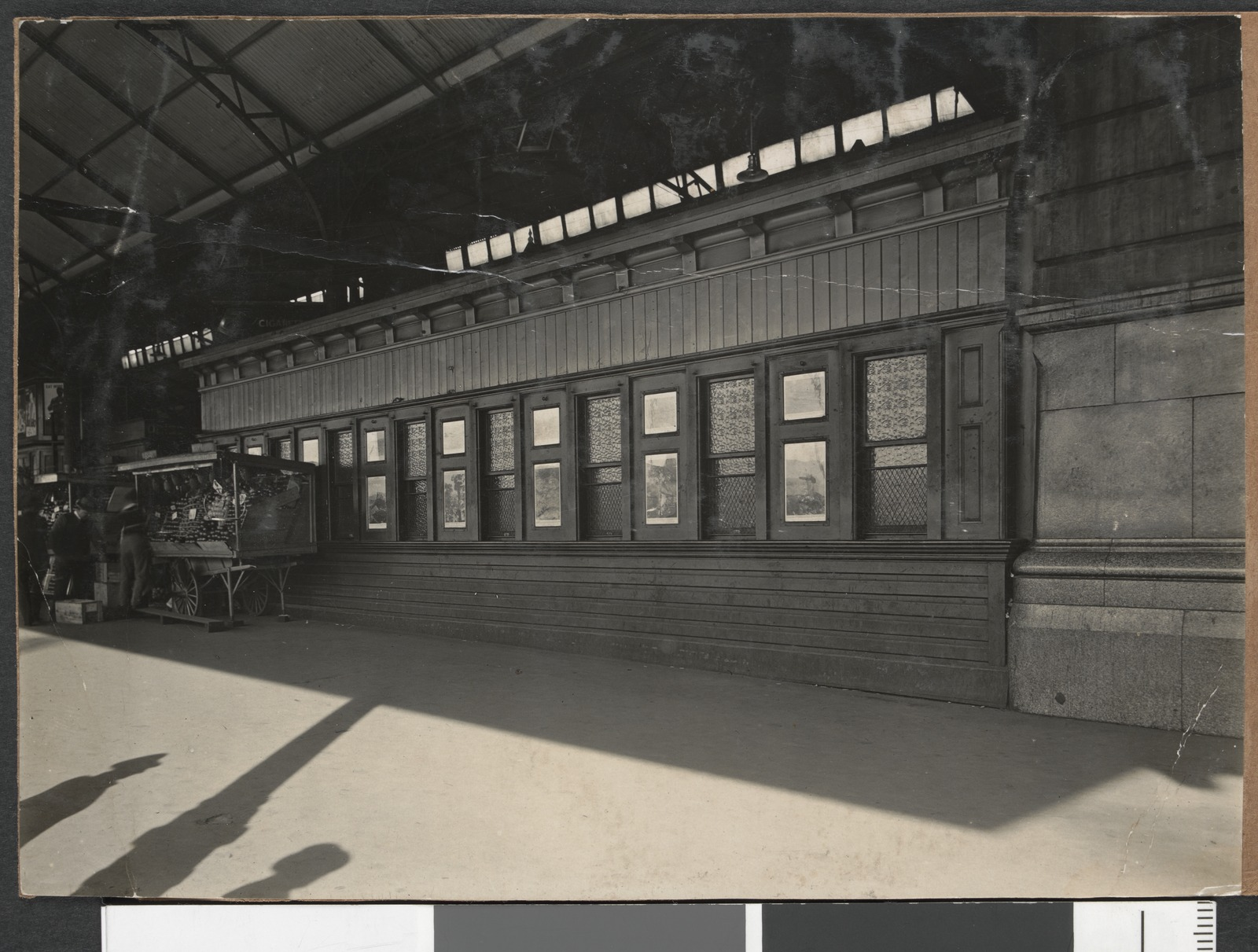
A ticket booth at the station, 1910s

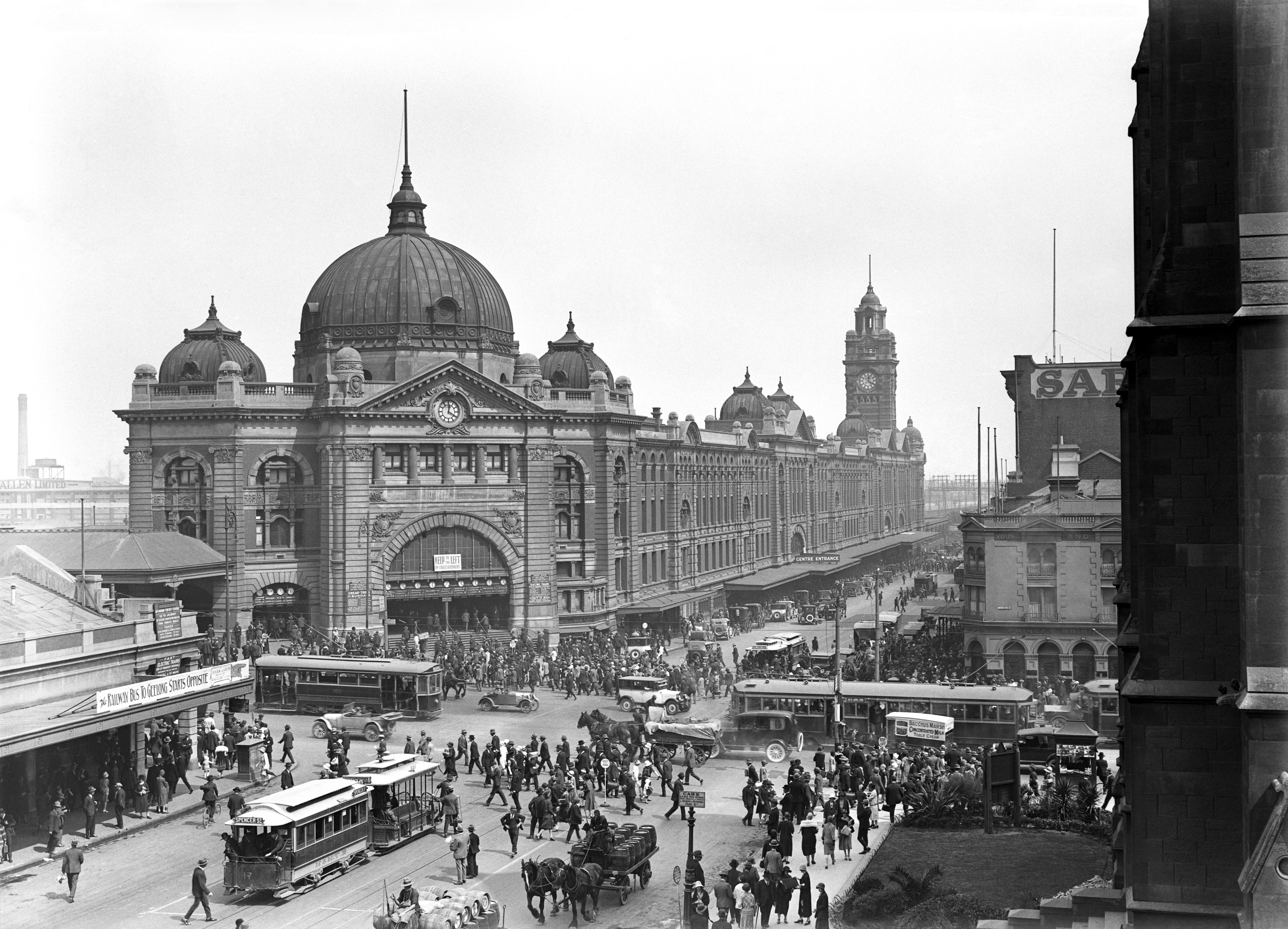
Flinders Street Station and the intersection of Flinders & Swanston Streets, 1927

In 1900, work began on the rearrangement of the station tracks, while the final design of the station building was still being worked on. Work on the central pedestrian subway started in 1901, and the foundations of the main building were completed by 1903.

In 1904, in mid-construction, the plans were extensively modified by the Railways Commissioners. The proposed single platform roof was replaced by individual platform roofs, and it was decided not to include the arched concourse roof. To increase office space, a fourth storey was added to the main building, which resulted in the arches above each entrance on Flinders Street being lowered, decreasing their dominance.

In 1905, work began on the station building itself, starting at the west end and progressing towards the main dome. Ballarat builder Peter Rodger was awarded the £93,000 contract. The building was originally to have been faced in stone, but that was considered too costly, so red brick, with cement render details, was used for the main building instead. Grey granite from Harcourt was used for many details at ground level on the Flinders Street side, "in view of the importance of this great public work". The southern façade of the main building consisted of a lightweight timber frame clad with zinc sheets, which were scored into blocks and painted red to look like large bricks. That was done to create corridors instead of what were to be open-access balconies inside the scrapped train shed.

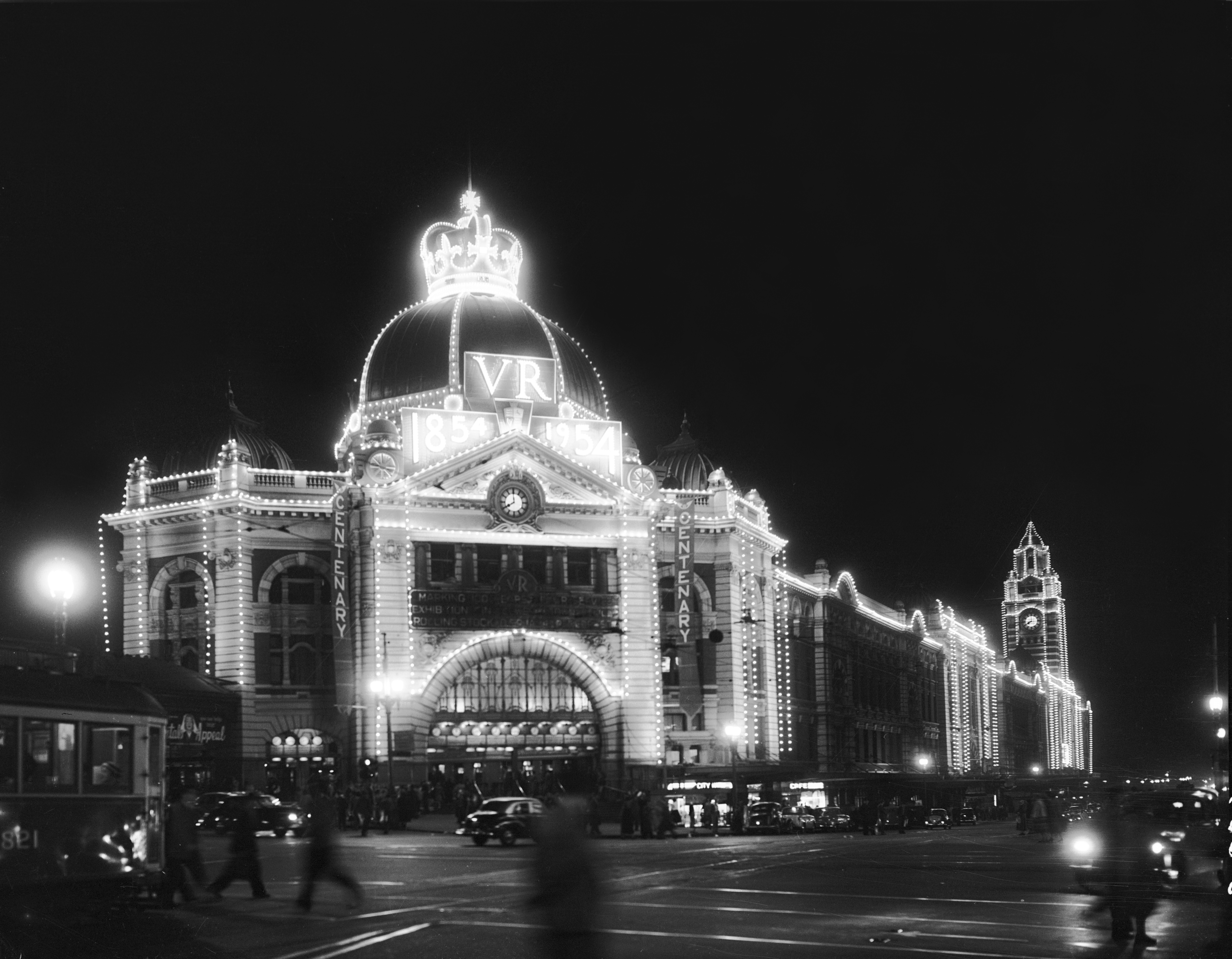
Flinders Street Station illuminated for the 1954 Royal Visit

Work on the dome started in 1906. The structure required heavy foundations because it extended over railway tracks. In May 1908, work was progressing more slowly than planned, with the expected completion date of April 1909 increasingly unlikely to be met. Rodger's contract was terminated in August 1908. A Royal Commission was appointed in May 1910, finding that Rodger could be held accountable for the slow progress in 1908, but he should be compensated for the difficulties before then. The Way and Works Branch of the Victorian Railways took over the project, and the station was essentially finished by mid-1909. The verandah along Flinders Street, and the concourse roof and verandah along Swanston Street, were not completed until after the official opening in 1910.

Frederick Karl Esling, superintending engineer, was responsible for building the new Flinders Street station, as well as the widening of Swanston Street over the railway lines, resolving the changing and complicated lay-out of the tracks at the station and yards, the duplication of the Flinders street railway viaduct, and rebuilding Princes Bridge Station.

The new Flinders Street station building had three levels at the concourse, or Swanston Street, end, and four at the lower Elizabeth Street end. Numerous shops and lettable spaces were provided, some on the concourse, but especially along the Flinders Street frontage, many at lower than street level, accessed by stairs, which created a fifth or basement level. The top three levels of the main building contained a large number of rooms, particularly along the Flinders Street frontage, mostly intended for railway use, but also many as lettable spaces. Numerous ticket windows were located at each entry, with services, such as a restaurant, country booking office, lost luggage office and visitors help booth, at the concourse or platform level. Much of the top floor was purpose-built for the then new Victorian Railway Institute, including a library, gym, and lecture hall which was later used as a ballroom. Those rooms have been largely abandoned and decaying since the 1980s.

For a number of years in the 1930s and 1940s, the building featured a creche next to the main dome on the top floor, with an open-air playground on an adjoining roof. Since 1910, the basement store beside the main entrance has been occupied by a hat shop, known as "City Hatters" since 1933.

The first electric train service operated from Flinders Street to Essendon in 1919, and by 1923 it was thought to be the world's busiest passenger station, with 2300 trains and 300,000 passengers daily. In 1954, to cater for increasing traffic, as well as for the 1956 Summer Olympics, the Degraves Street subway from the station was extended to the north side of Flinders Street, creating Campbell Arcade. In March 1966, platform 1 was extended to 708 metres (2,322 ft) long.

=== Redevelopment plans ===
Plans arose at various times from the 1960s to the 1970s for the demolition or redevelopment of the station, as well as the adjacent Jolimont Yard area. The station had fallen into disrepair, having not been cleaned in decades, and was covered with advertising hoardings and neon signs.

In 1962, the Minister for Transport and HKJ Pty Ltd signed an agreement for a £30 million redevelopment of the station that would have resulted in the demolition of the clock tower and its replacement by an office building up to 60 storeys high. Work was to begin in 1964 but, instead, the Gas & Fuel Building was constructed over Princes Bridge station. In 1967, a company purchased the option to lease the space above Flinders Street Station, planning to build a shopping plaza and two office towers, with the dome and clock tower to be kept as part of the design, but strong opposition saw the project lapse.

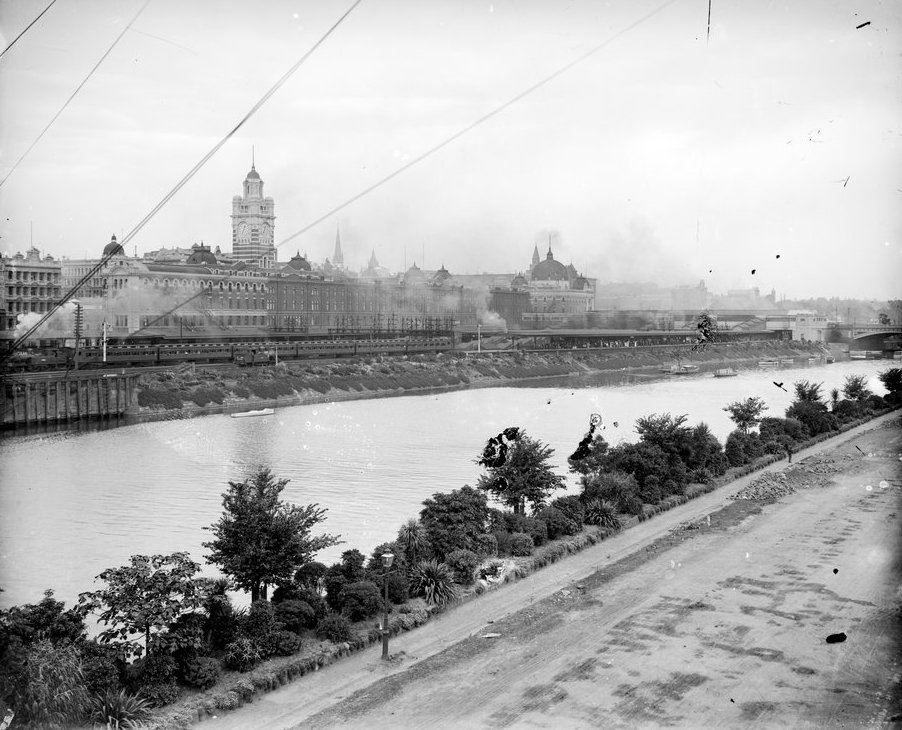
Looking north across Yarra River towards Flinders Street railway lines and buildings, c. 1914.

In 1972, Victorian Premier Henry Bolte unveiled another redevelopment plan, to cover 11 hectares (27 acres) of space above the station and Jolimont Yard for a complex of shops, offices, theatres and other community facilities. A newspaper report of 1974 said that planning was still underway for the $250 million proposal, but by 1975, public perceptions had begun to turn towards retention of the station. A Builders Labourers Federation green ban at the time helped preserve it in its existing form. The controversy over these proposals led to a re-appraisal of the architecture and significance of the station, which had been seen as something of an oddity, or even simply as dirty and ugly, such that it was classified by the National Trust of Australia (Victoria) by 1976, and eventually listed on the state Heritage Register in 1982.

In 1989, under the John Cain government, an agreement to construct a "Festival Marketplace" was signed. Designed by Daryl Jackson architects, it was to be built over the existing platforms in a style sympathetic to the existing station, and be completed by 1992. Planned to feature shops, restaurants and cafes, the project was abandoned in 1991 after the inability of the financiers to come up with the $205 million required due to the early 1990s recession.

In November 2011, the Victorian Government launched a $1 million international design competition to rejuvenate and restore the station. In October 2012, after receiving 118 submissions, six finalists were selected. The public could vote and the jury's choice and people's choice winner were announced on 8 August 2013. The competition winner was Hassell + Herzog & de Meuron, while the people's choice winner were University of Melbourne students Eduardo Velasquez, Manuel Pineda and Santiago Medina. No funding was attached to the competition, and no major changes were undertaken.

=== Refurbishment ===
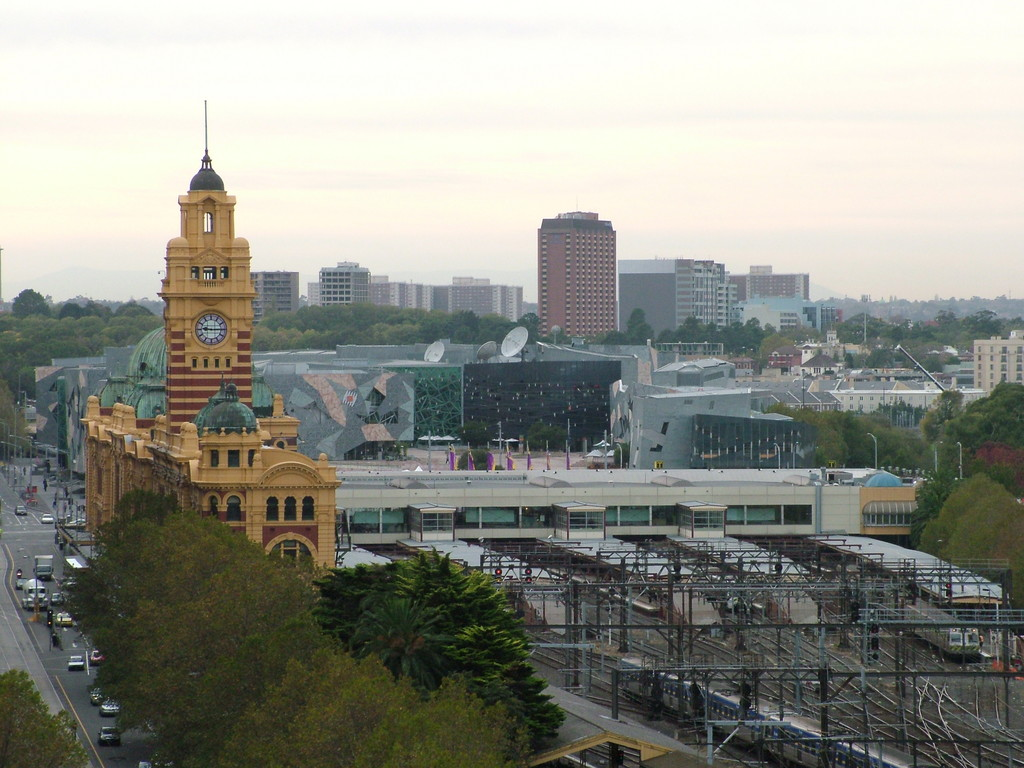
Westbound view of the station building, May 2005

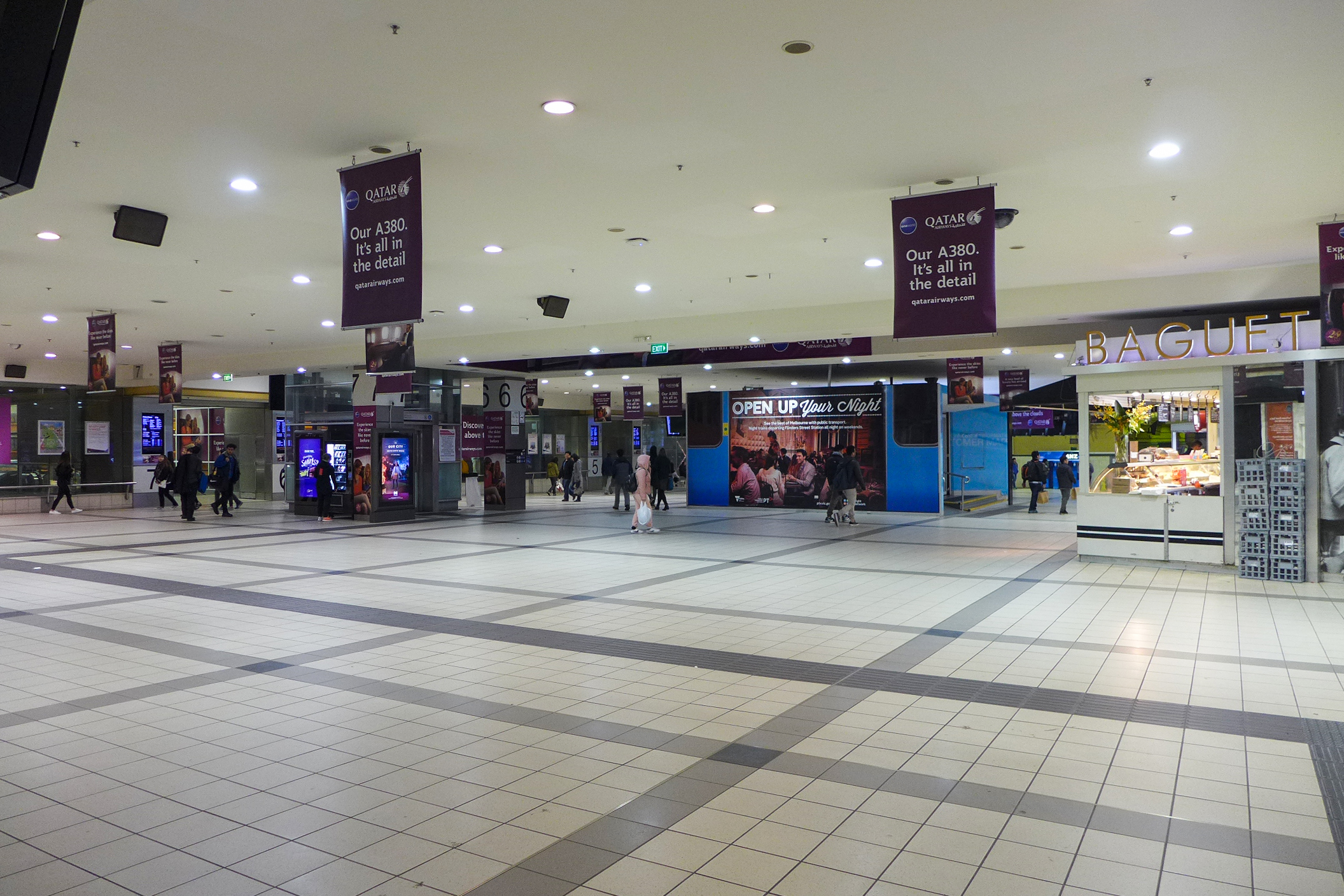
Main concourse, August 2017

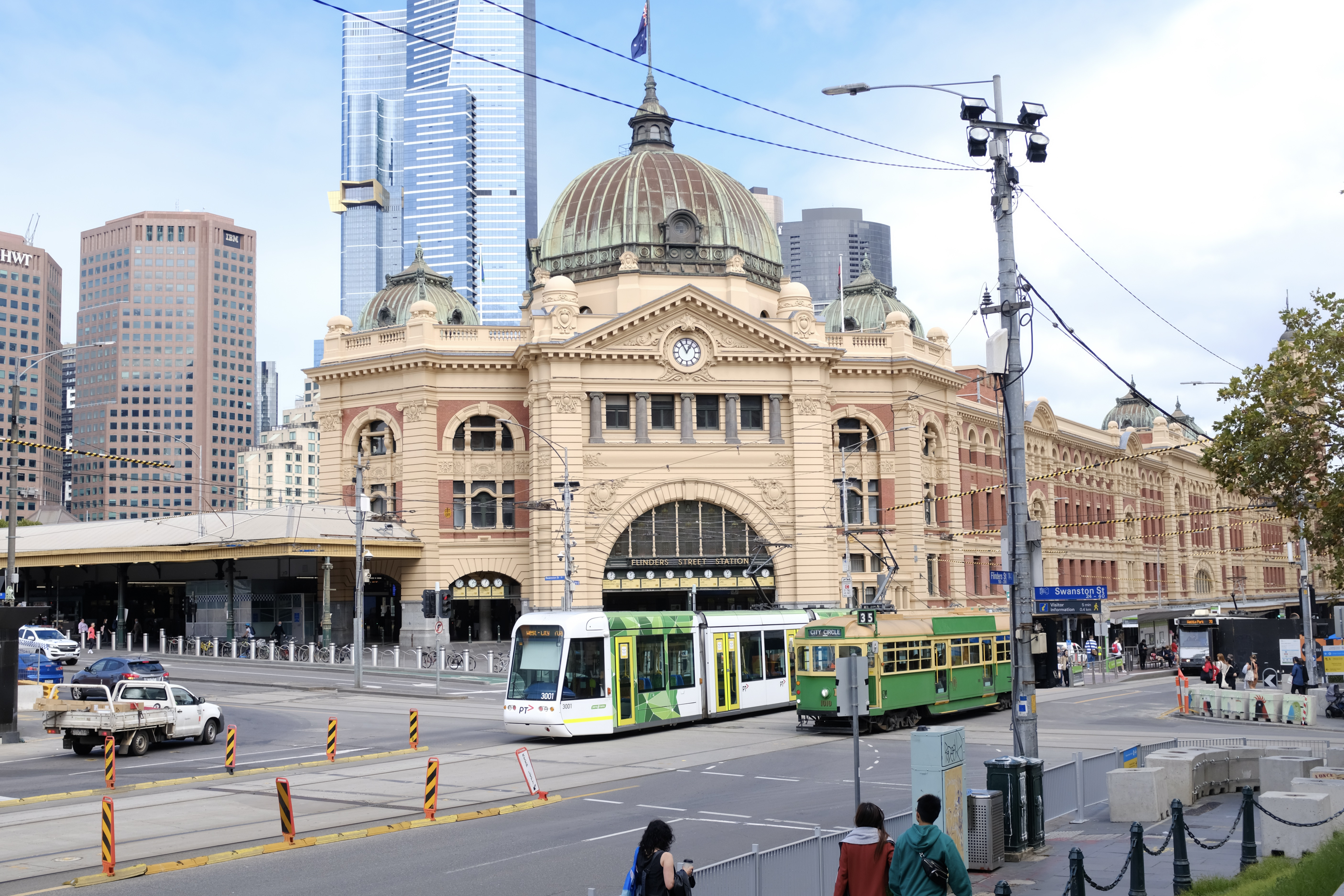
View showing the repainted façade of Flinders Street in softer, heritage colours, March 2021

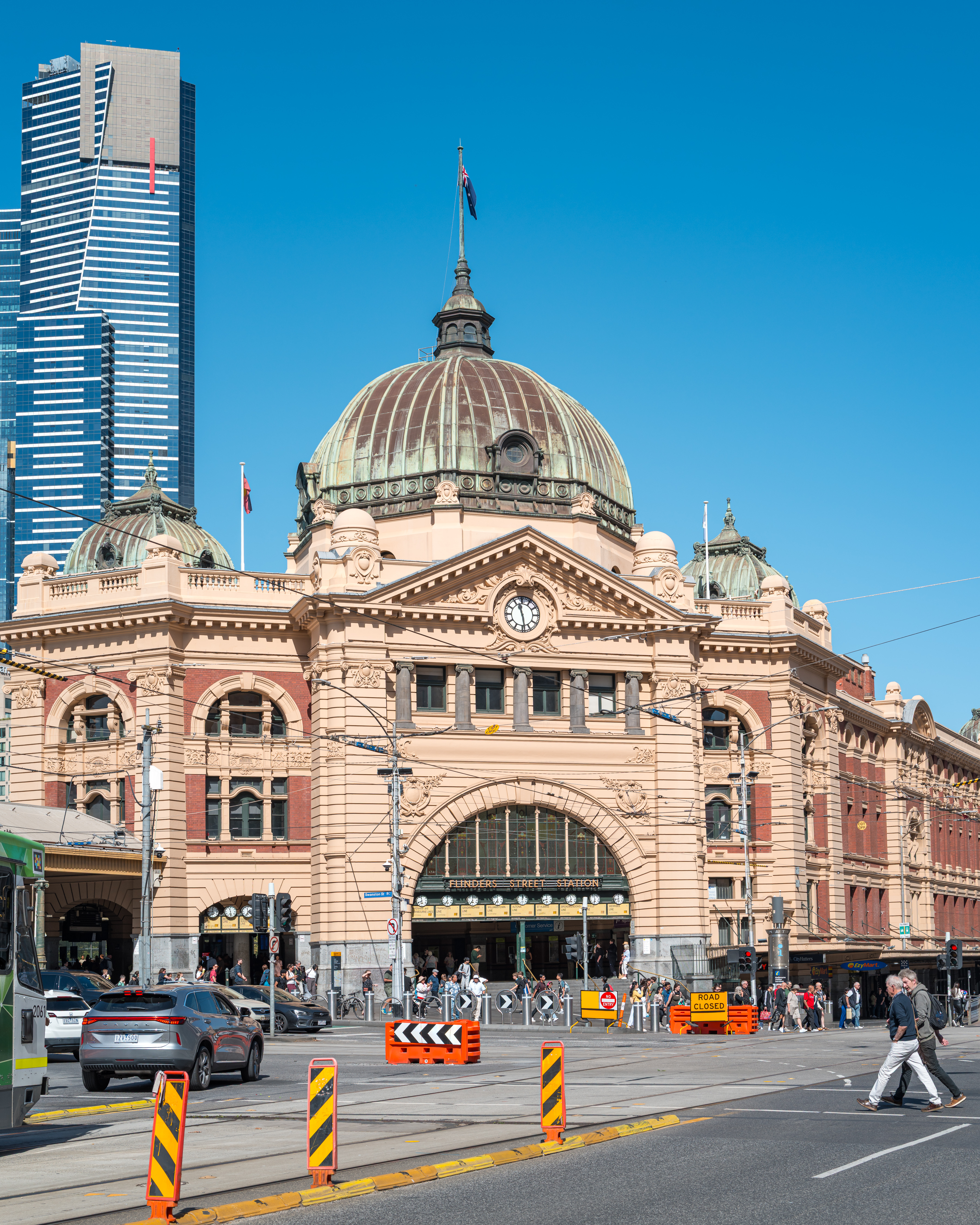
Station building and entrance as of March 2025

The Swanston Street concourse has undergone the most change of any part of the station, and is now three times the depth of the original structure, is located near Federation Square and only the canopy and roofed area on Swanston Street remains of the original. After the first round of works in 1985 a City of Melbourne councillor, Trevor Huggard, described the renovation as "vandalism of historically important sections of the station", and in 1997 the National Trust of Australia described the additions to the concourse as unsympathetic and detrimental to the station, having "the character of a modern shopping centre".

The television displays used to display next train information were added to each platform in July 1980.

In 1982, a $7 million refurbishment was announced by the Minister for Transport, Steven Crabb, divided into four phases, designed by the railways architect Kris Kudlicki. Completed by 1984, the first escalators at the station provided on platforms 2 and 3 replaced ramps, and new public toilets were provided, replacing those over the platforms. The main station concourse was tiled and extended westward over the tracks, with skylights added above the ramps, and 16 new shops opened on the concourse. A restaurant was built on the southern side facing the river, which opened in October 1985, but closed soon after, instead becoming the "Clocks on Flinders" poker machine venue in 1994. The main steps were embedded with electrical circuits to keep them dry in June 1985.

In 1993, the Elizabeth Street subway was extended and opened at the Southbank end. Conservation work was also carried out to the main building, with the external facade repainted, exterior feature lighting installed, and the stained glass feature windows above each entry restored. Further changes were made through the late 1990s with the opening of access from the main Swanston Street concourse to platform 1, platform resurfacing with tactile tiles, and the replacement of the remainder of the original platform access ramps (except platform 10) with escalators and elevators.

The tracks to the east of the station were rebuilt between 1997 and 1998 to clear the way for the Federation Square project. Jolimont Yard was eliminated, with $40 million spent to reduce 53 operating lines between Flinders Street and Richmond Station to just 12. The number of points was also reduced, from 164 to 48. These changes also saw a reallocation of platform usage at the station, country trains being shifted from platform 1 to platform 10, and Clifton Hill group trains being shifted from the deleted Princes Bridge station to platform 1.

The final round of changes were completed by 2007. It included refurbishment of the building roof and concourse foundations, an upgrade of platform 10 with escalators and a lift replacing the ramp, the relocation of all ticket booking offices to the main entrance under the main dome and new LCD passenger information displays installed on the platforms, subways and concourse. In March 2009 an escalator replaced the lift to platform 12 and 13, with platform 13 also extended west into daylight along the alignment of the former platform 11.

In 2008, the retail pavilions on the concourse were rebuilt, increasing their area. An investigation of the potential of the abandoned spaces in the station, overseen by a task force comprising representatives from Connex, the Committee for Melbourne, Melbourne City Council, Heritage Victoria, was completed the same year, but the conclusions were not made public. In January 2010, one of the first announcements by the new Minister for Public Transport was that the government was investigating the refurbishment of the abandoned spaces for "cultural uses". In mid-February 2015, Premier Daniel Andrews and Minister for Public Transport Jacinta Allan announced that $100 million would be spent for urgent refurbishment works to upgrade station platforms, entrances, toilets, information displays and to restore the exterior of the main building.

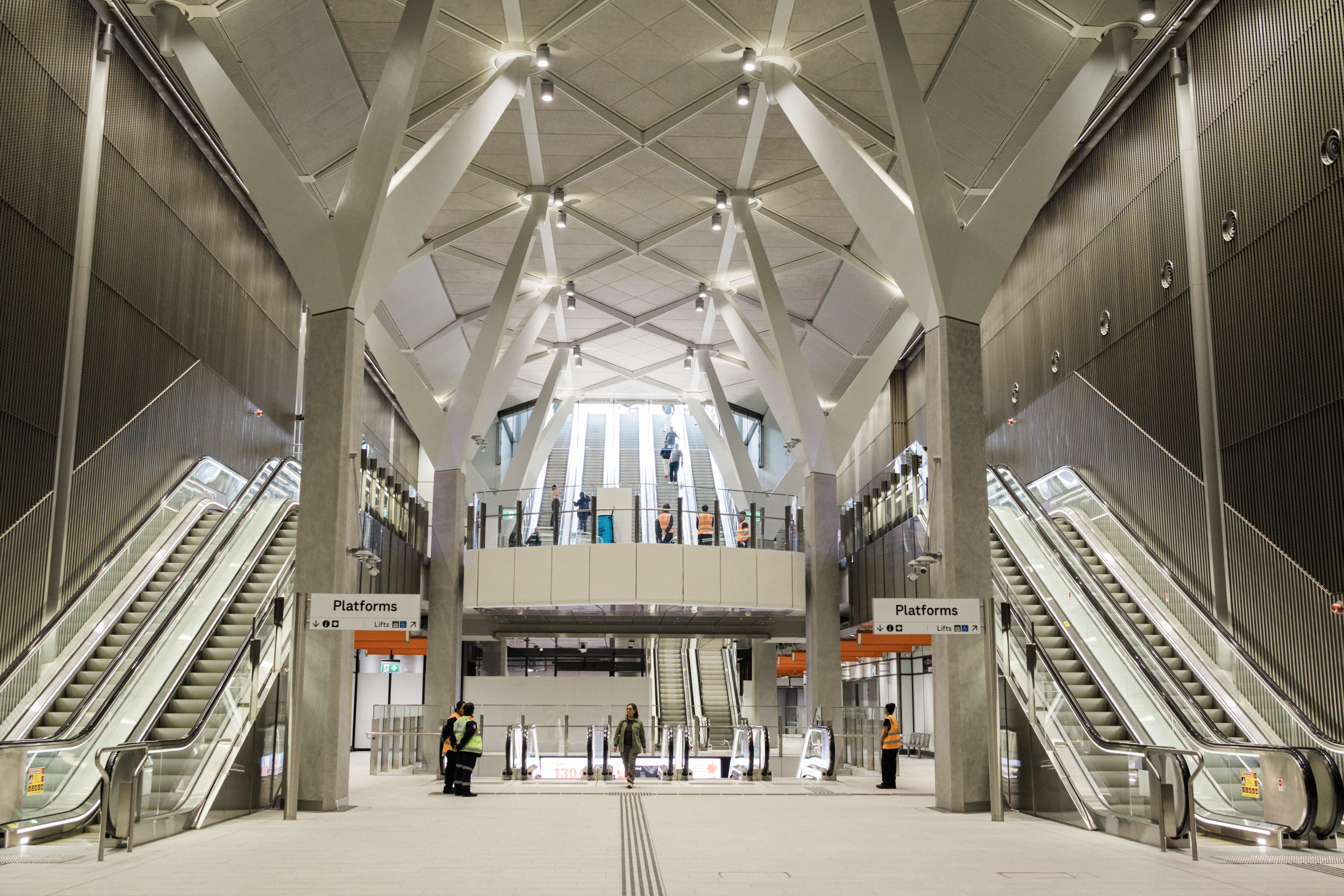
The main concourse of Town Hall station.

By July 2017, the station had been almost completely repainted in the original 1910 colours. The distinctive yellow mustard colour was replaced with more muted shades of stone and red, which were determined based on a forensic analysis of the original paint layers on the surface of the building.

As painting continued in January 2018, a further round of works was announced including the renewal of the Elizabeth Street pedestrian subway and rebuilding of the subway's south entrance to include direct access to platform 10. In 2018 the pedestrian forecourt in front of the station's main entrance was expanded and new bollards were installed to protect pedestrians from cars, as part of the security response to the January 2017 Bourke Street car attack.

== Town Hall station ==
As part of the Metro Tunnel project, City Square on Swanston Street was fenced off in 2017 for the commencement of construction works on a new CBD station, to connect with Flinders Street. In November 2017, after a naming competition, it was announced the CBD South station would have a separate name from Flinders Street station and be named for the nearby Melbourne Town Hall. Major station works on Town Hall station began in 2018 and the station opened in late 2025.

The new station connects with Flinders Street station via an underground walkway through the existing Campbell Arcade and Degraves Street underpass. A number of changes were made to the design of the connection with the 1950s Campbell Arcade to preserve the site's heritage character and small, art deco shopfronts. In 2019, a section of Flinders Street was closed to cars to allow the construction of the underground connection between the two stations.

The connection, named Flinders Link, allows for a paid-area interchange between Metro Tunnel services at Town Hall and Flinders Street services. As part of the project, six lifts were installed on Flinders Street station platforms 1–10 to allow for access via the Degraves Street underpass.

On 29 January 2025, the Degraves Street Subway reopened after being closed since April 2022. As part of the upgrade elevators were added in place of one of the sets of stairs up to the platforms. The exits onto Flinders and Degraves Street as well as Campbell Arcade were reopened on 28 July 2025. The connection from Campbell Arcade to Town Hall opened alongside the Metro Tunnel on 30 November 2025.

== Station layout ==
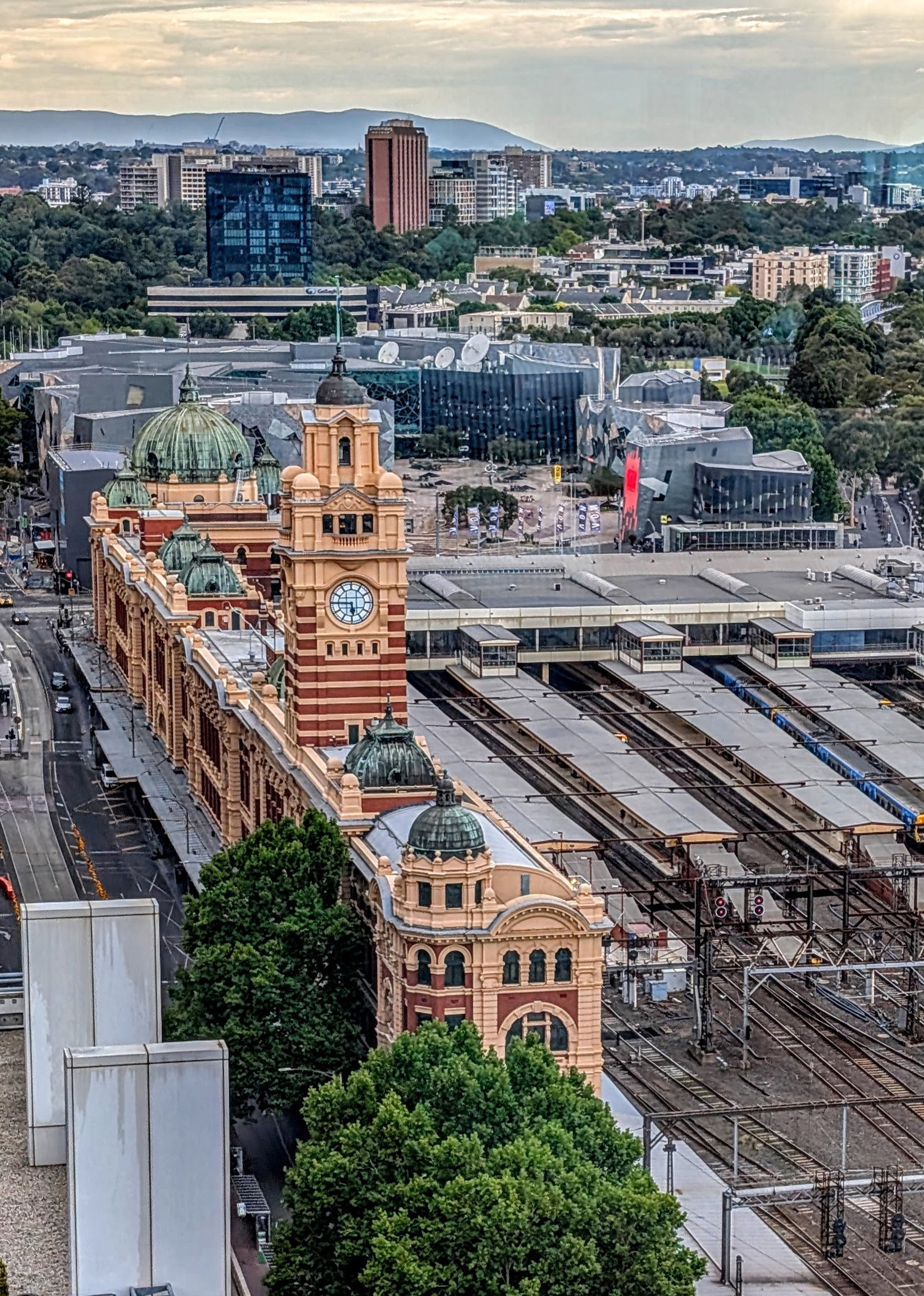
Station view from high in the northwest, 2025

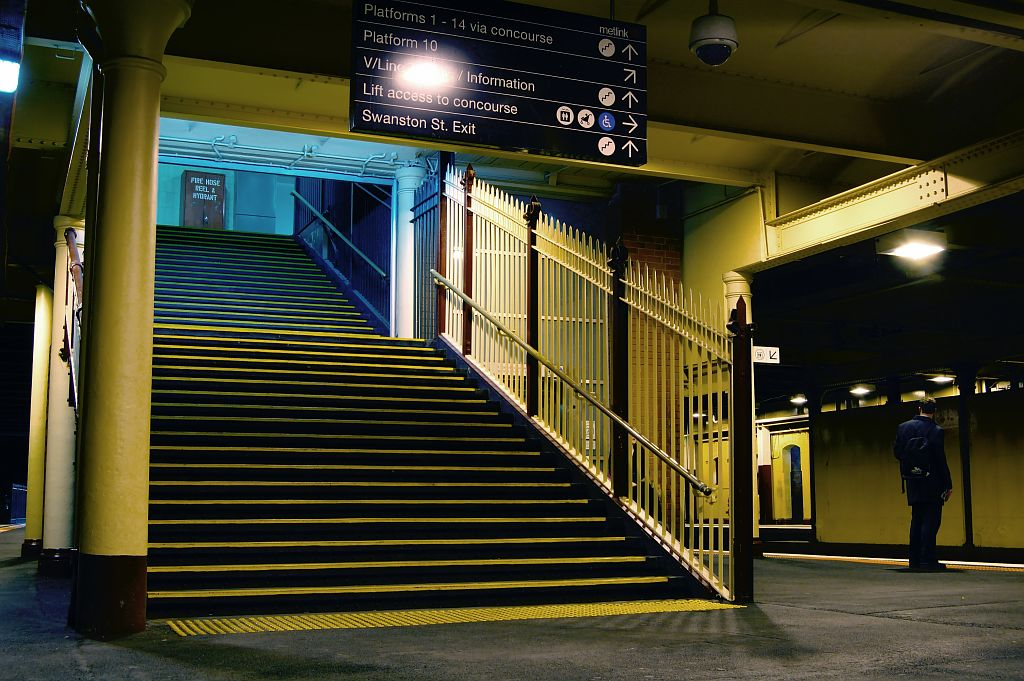
Steps from platforms 12 & 13, prior to the installation of an escalator

The platform layout at Flinders Street is almost entirely composed of through tracks – a product of the constrained geography of the site and the haphazard development of the rail network around it. The first platform at the station, constructed near and parallel to Flinders Street itself, was barely even 30 m (98 ft 5 in) long, and allowed trains from Port Melbourne to terminate. The opening of the rail connection under Swanston Street in 1865 enabled trains from Brighton to access the platform, and so it was later extended to enable the simultaneous arrival of trains from the east and west.

A second platform to the south of the first was provided in 1877, after the amalgamation of railway companies began to increase traffic at the station. Platform expansion began in earnest following the 1882 recommendation that Flinders Street be developed as a major terminal, and the subsequent government acquisition of the railways between 1889 and 1892, three further platforms were constructed on land acquired from the former fish market in anticipation of additional traffic, which eventuated when Essendon, Coburg and Williamstown trains were routed across the viaduct in 1894. Development continued with the completion of the 1899 ground plan, which specified a total of 11 platforms – platform 1 along the main building and five pairs of island platforms to the south. The remaining platforms were constructed as works progressed on the main building, and in 1909, a decision was made to extend platforms 10 and 11 eastwards, creating two new platforms originally numbered 10 East and 11 East and now numbered 12 and 13.

Railway officials proposed amalgamating the nearby Princes Bridge station with Flinders Street with improved passenger connections in the 1890s, but failed to obtain funding from the state government for the project despite the massive redevelopment works. Nevertheless, the two stations were merged for signalling and operational purposes in 1910, and in 1966, platform 1 at Flinders Street was extended to meet its counterpart at Princes Bridge, creating a single platform face with a length over 800 m (2,600 ft). The west end of platform 1 could also be used as a separate "Platform 1 West". Eventually, in 1980, Princes Bridge was formally incorporated into Flinders Street and its three platforms were renumbered 14, 15 and 16.

Several platforms were decommissioned in the early 1990s following reductions in suburban train services. Platform 11 fell into disuse following the closure of the Port Melbourne line in 1987, and platforms 14, 15 and 16 were closed to regular services, along with the west end of platform 1. Although proposals were made to reopen it by the East West Link Needs Assessment, the platform 11 site was converted into a bar and restaurant in 2014. Platforms 15 and 16 were demolished to make way for Federation Square, but platform 14 remains intermittently in use.

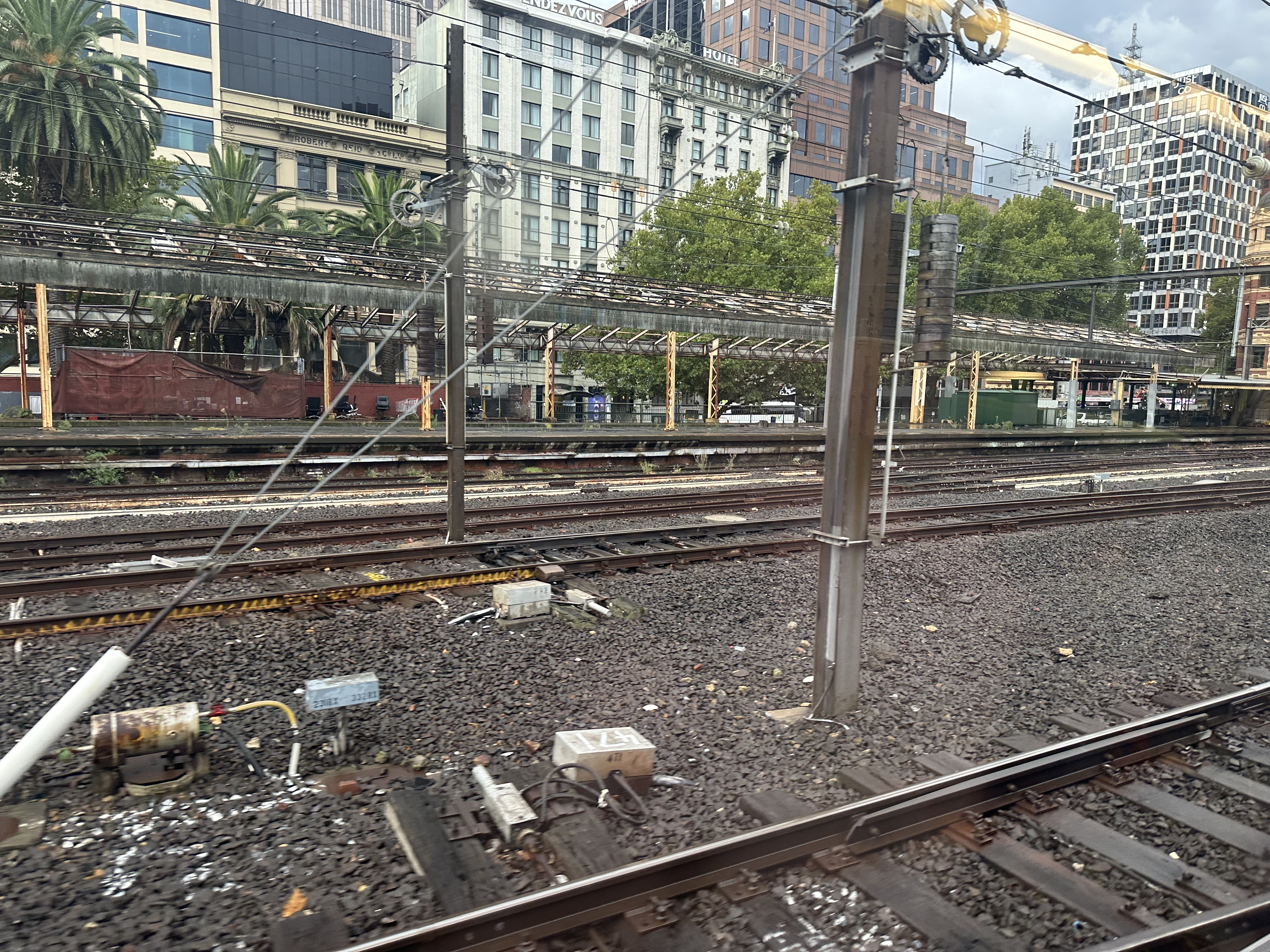
View of the Milk Dock in April 2026

A short dock platform, known as the Milk Dock or Parcels Dock, was constructed in 1910 to the north of platform 1 at the west end of the main building. Prior to the widespread transport of dairy products by road, the dock was a distribution centre for milk and other small goods arriving in Melbourne on early morning trains from Gippsland. Other small goods and parcels were later also loaded at the dock until most such traffic ceased in the 1960s. The structure remains essentially intact.

Three concourses link the platforms. The main concourse is at the east end of the station, located off Swanston Street and the main dome, and has direct access to all platforms via escalators, stair and elevators. The Degraves Street subway runs under the centre of the station, exiting to Flinders Street at the north end, with stairs directly connecting to all platforms except for platform numbers 12 and 13. The Elizabeth Street subway is at the west end, and has direct access via ramps to all platforms except for platforms 12, 13 and 14, and via a stairway to platform 1, reopened in 2017.

== Platforms ==
Trains may use a different platform if the platform it is originally scheduled at is occupied.

=== Metropolitan ===
Flinders Street platform arrangement
Platform	Line	Destinations	Via	Service Type	Notes	Source
1	Mernda line Hurstbridge line	Mernda, Macleod, Greensborough, Eltham or Hurstbridge	City Loop	All stations and limited express services	Services to Macleod and Greensborough only operate during weekday peaks.	
2	Glen Waverley line Alamein line Lilydale line Belgrave line	Glen Waverley, Alamein, Blackburn, Lilydale, Ringwood or Belgrave	City Loop or Richmond	All stations and limited express services	Services to Alamein and Ringwood only operate during weekday peaks. Services to Blackburn only operate on weekdays.	
3	Glen Waverley line Alamein line Lilydale line Belgrave line	Glen Waverley, Alamein, Blackburn, Lilydale, Ringwood or Belgrave	City Loop or Richmond	All stations and limited express services	Services to Alamein and Ringwood only operate during weekday peaks. Services to Blackburn only operate on weekdays.	
4	Glen Waverley line Alamein line Lilydale line Belgrave line	Glen Waverley, Alamein, Blackburn, Lilydale, Ringwood or Belgrave	City Loop or Richmond	All stations and limited express services	Services to Alamein and Ringwood only operate during weekday peaks. Services to Blackburn only operate on weekdays.	
4	Craigieburn line Upfield line	Broadmeadows, Craigieburn or Upfield	City Loop or Southern Cross	All stations and limited express services	Services to Broadmeadows only operate during weekday morning peaks.	
5	Craigieburn line Upfield line	Broadmeadows, Craigieburn or Upfield	City Loop or Southern Cross	All stations and limited express services	Services to Broadmeadows only operate during weekday morning peaks.	
6	Frankston line	Cheltenham, Mordialloc, Carrum or Frankston	Richmond	All stations and limited express services	Services to Cheltenham, Mordialloc and Carrum only operate during weekday peaks.	
7	Frankston line	Cheltenham, Mordialloc, Carrum or Frankston	Richmond	All stations and limited express services	Services to Cheltenham, Mordialloc and Carrum only operate during weekday peaks.	
8	Sandringham line	Sandringham	Richmond	All stations		
9	Werribee line Williamstown line	Werribee or Williamstown	Southern Cross	All stations and limited express services		
10	Werribee line Williamstown line	Laverton, Werribee or Williamstown	Southern Cross	All stations and limited express services	Services to Laverton only operate on weekdays.	
12	Werribee line Williamstown line	Laverton, Werribee or Williamstown	Southern Cross	All stations and limited express services	Infrequently used during weekday peaks.	
13	Sandringham line	Sandringham	Richmond	All stations	Infrequently used during weekday peaks.	
14	Emergency egress only					

=== Regional Services ===
Flinders Street platform arrangement
Platform	Line	Destinations	Via	Service Type	Notes
7	Gippsland line	Traralgon or Bairnsdale	Richmond	Pick up only	Services may also depart from platforms 8 or 9.
10	Gippsland line	Southern Cross	Set down only		Services may also depart from platforms 9 or 12.

=== Special Services ===
Flinders Street platform arrangement
Platform	Line	Destinations	Via	Service Type	Notes
2	City Circle	Flinders Street	City Loop	All stations	Operates when other loop tunnels are closed.
6	Flemington Racecourse Line	Showgrounds or Flemington Racecourse	Southern Cross	Limited Express services	Services may also depart from platforms 8, 9, 10 or 12.

== Clocks ==
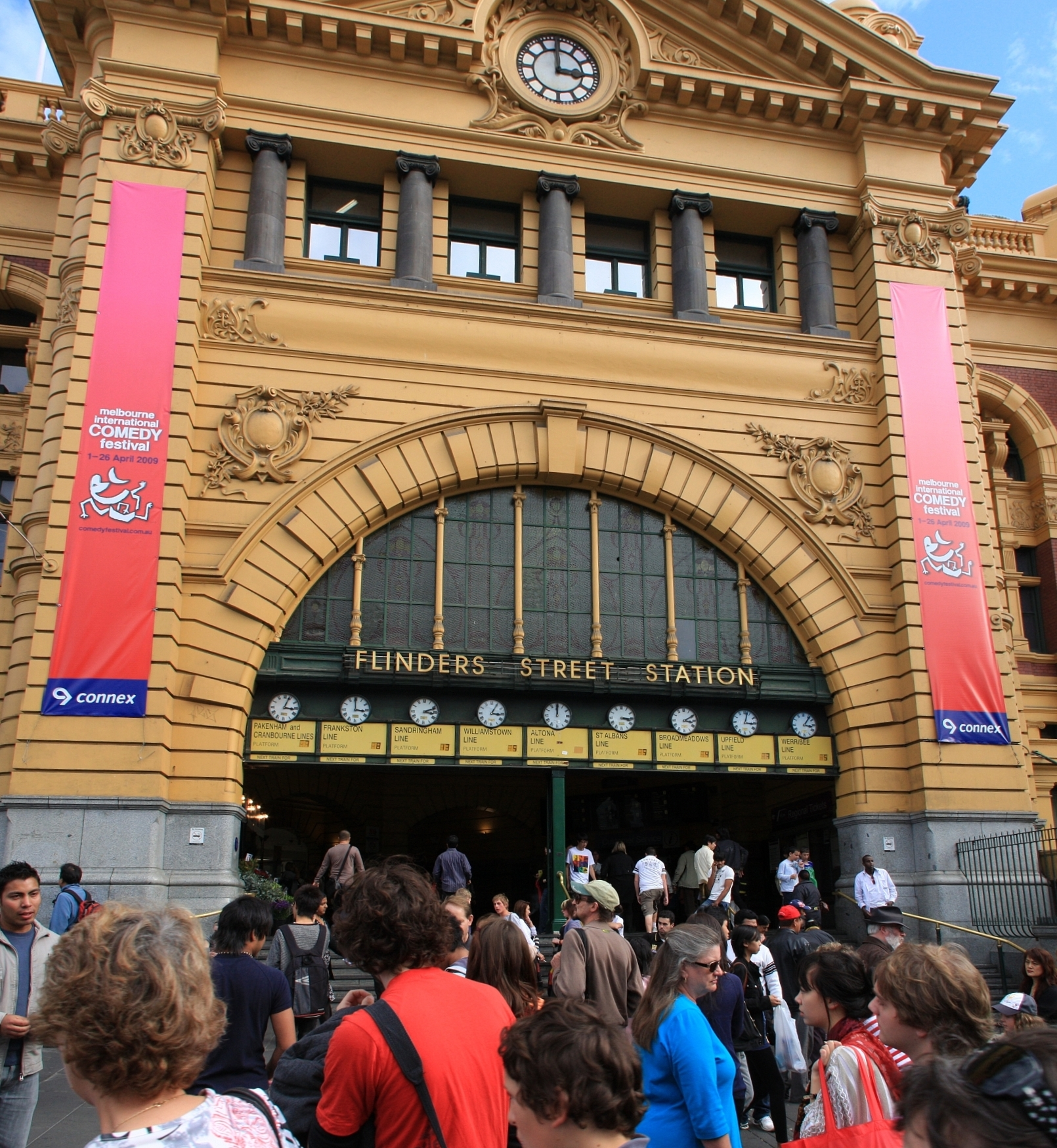
Clocks at the main entrance, 2009

The distinctive clocks under the main dome that show the departure times of the next trains date back to the 1860s. Sixty Bathgate indicators were purchased from England for use at the Flinders Street, Spencer Street, Richmond and South Yarra stations. Those at Flinders Street were placed into storage when the old station was demolished in 1904, with 28 placed into the new station in 1910. They were located at the main entry under the dome, the southern side archway, and the Degraves and Elizabeth Street entrances.

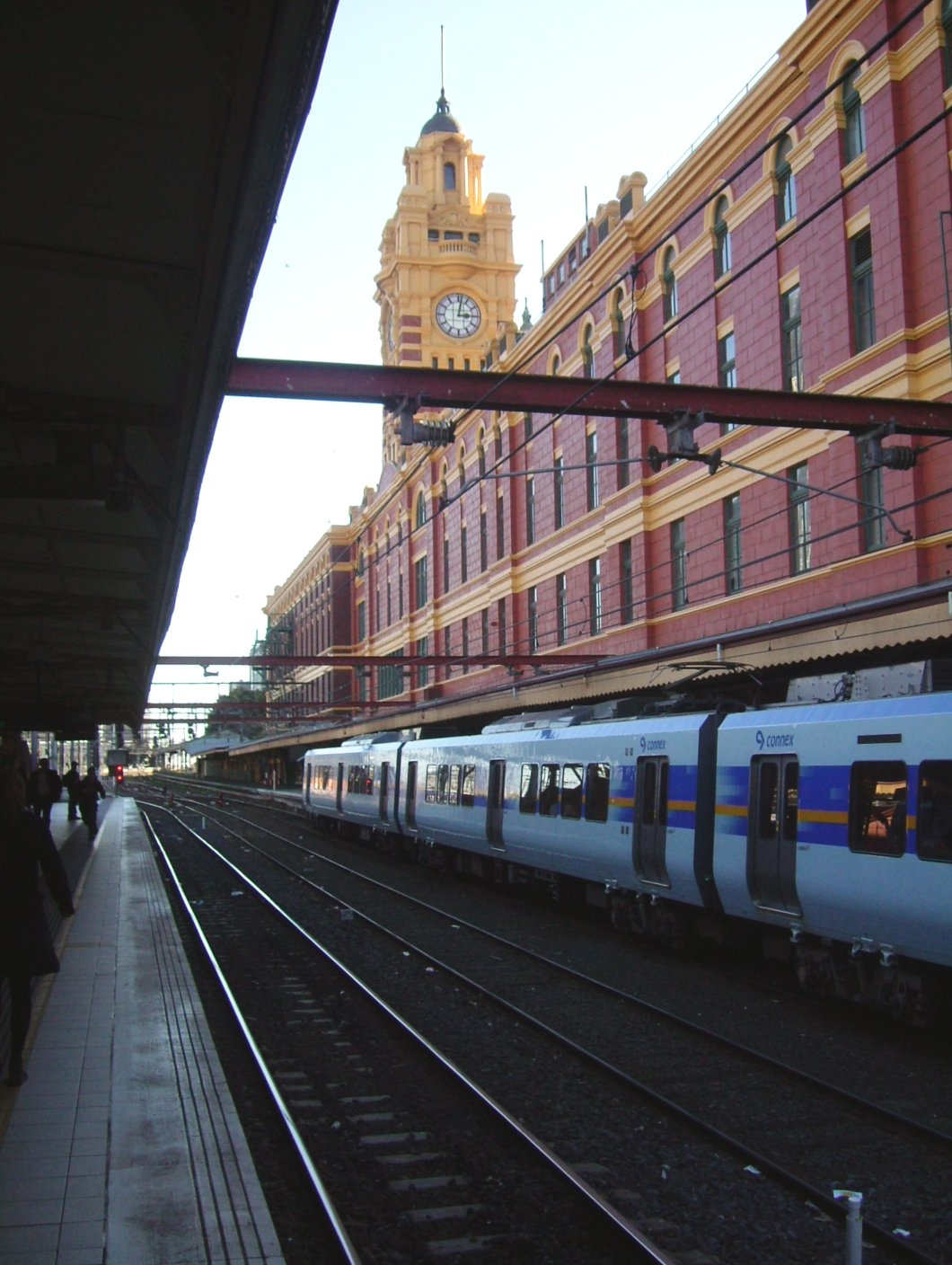
An X'Trapolis 100 train on Platform 1 below the Elizabeth Street clock tower, August 2006

Manually operated by a railway officer using a long pole, during an 8-hour period the clocks at the main entrance were changed an average of 900 times. The original indicator clocks were removed from service in 1983 as part of a redevelopment of the station, with their replacement by digital displays planned. An outpouring of public outrage and sentimentality saw the decision reversed within one day. The clocks at the main entrance were altered to automatic operation by computer, but those at the Degraves and Elizabeth Street entrances were replaced by large airport-style split-flap displays.

The space "under the clocks" or "on the steps" leading to the dome has been a popular informal meeting place for Melburnians since the station's opening. Although the area was not intended for this purpose, and there is no seating or other infrastructure to suggest it as a destination, the location – opposite the well-known Young and Jackson Hotel and overlooking two of the busiest tram routes in the city – means it is accessible and visible to many of the city's main pedestrian thoroughfares. Many people who meet "under the clocks" do not arrive by train; the site's cultural significance extends beyond its main function as a transport hub.

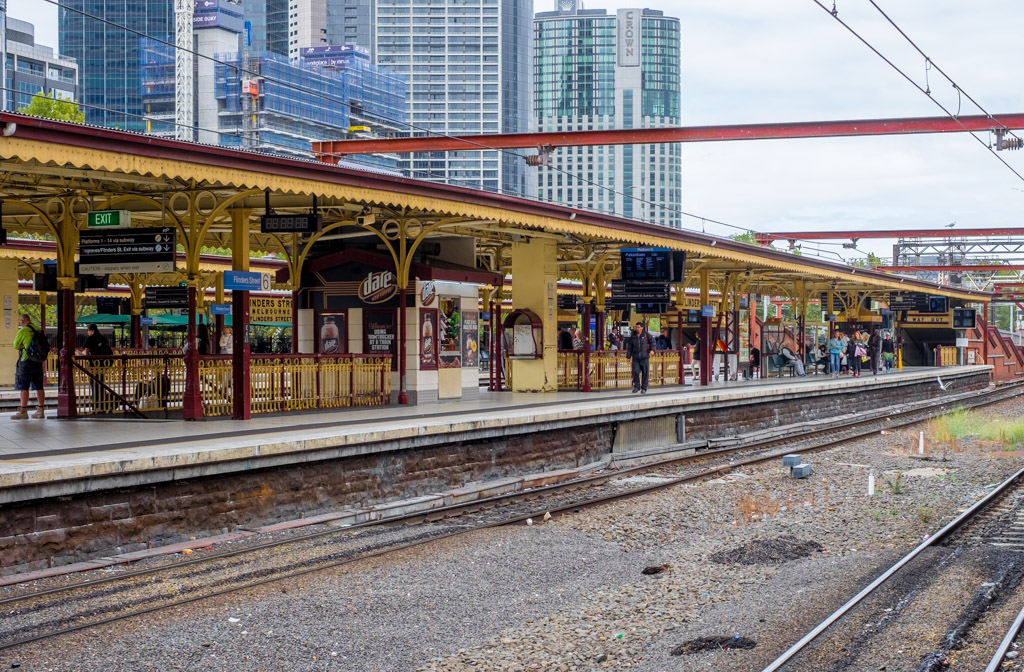
Looking southwest towards platform 6 from platform 5, showing the space where track 5A formerly was, March 2016

A clock tower has also existed at the end of Elizabeth Street since 1883. The first one was known as the 'Water Tower Clock', after a wooden framed water tower erected on the site in 1853. That clock remained in place until 1905 when work begun on the new station, the clock tower being moved to outside Princes Bridge station. In 1911 it was moved to Spencer Street station, where it remained until the station was redeveloped in 1967. Sold to a private collector, it was returned to public ownership and in 1999 was put on display at the Scienceworks Museum, Spotswood. It was returned to the renamed Southern Cross station in 2014.

Today's Elizabeth Street clock tower was constructed between August 1906 and November 1907, the clock being built to an English design by Melbourne clock maker F. Ziegeler. Originally needing to be wound every day, it is now electrically operated. It was cleaned and overhauled between 2017 and 2018 before being fully restored to service.

== Signal boxes ==
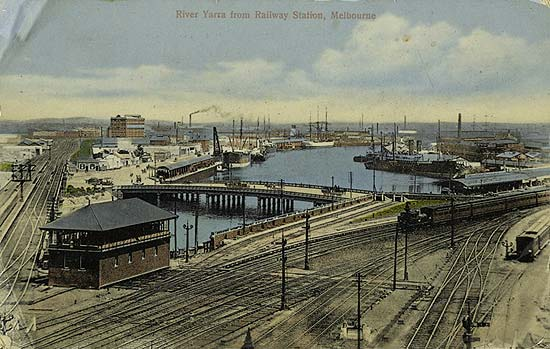
Flinders Street "A" signal box, c. 1913

The first signal boxes were opened at the station in 1883, one at each end of the platforms. From the 1900s until 1983, five signal boxes controlled traffic into the station.

Flinders Street A was located at the western end of the station, between the lines to St Kilda/Port Melbourne and Spencer Street, and controlled all traffic from the west. It was of "traditional" Victorian Railways design, in brick, and had two mechanical lever frames of equal size, totalling 280 levers. The mechanical signals were decommissioned in October 1979. The signal box has been burnt twice, the second time being in 2002, destroying the timber and glass superstructure and slate roof. In 2009, it was rebuilt as Signal, a youth arts centre funded by the City of Melbourne.

Flinders Street B was located at the Richmond end of platforms 8 and 9 and controlled the southern tracks from Jolimont Yard. It was of traditional VR design, in brick, and was demolished when the Federation Square deck was built.

Flinders Street C was located beyond the Richmond end of platforms 4 and 5 and controlled the northern tracks from Jolimont Yard. It was of traditional VR design and was demolished together with Flinders Street B.

Flinders Street D was located at the Richmond end of the Princes Bridge island platform (later incorporated into Flinders Street as platforms 15 and 16). The structure, of utilitarian brick construction, remains today, just beyond the Federation Square deck.

Flinders Street E was located at Richmond Junction, and controlled the junction as well as access into the Richmond end of the stabling sidings. Of utilitarian brick construction, it remains in place today underneath the William Barak Bridge.

Since 1983, the station has been remotely controlled by Metrol. The station precinct is operated by four interlockings corresponding to former signal boxes A, B, D and E.

== Usage ==
Passenger usage at Flinders Street Station between 2008 and 2024.

Flinders Street is the busiest station on Melbourne's metropolitan network. In 2023-24 it recorded 20.35 million passengers.

== Transport links ==
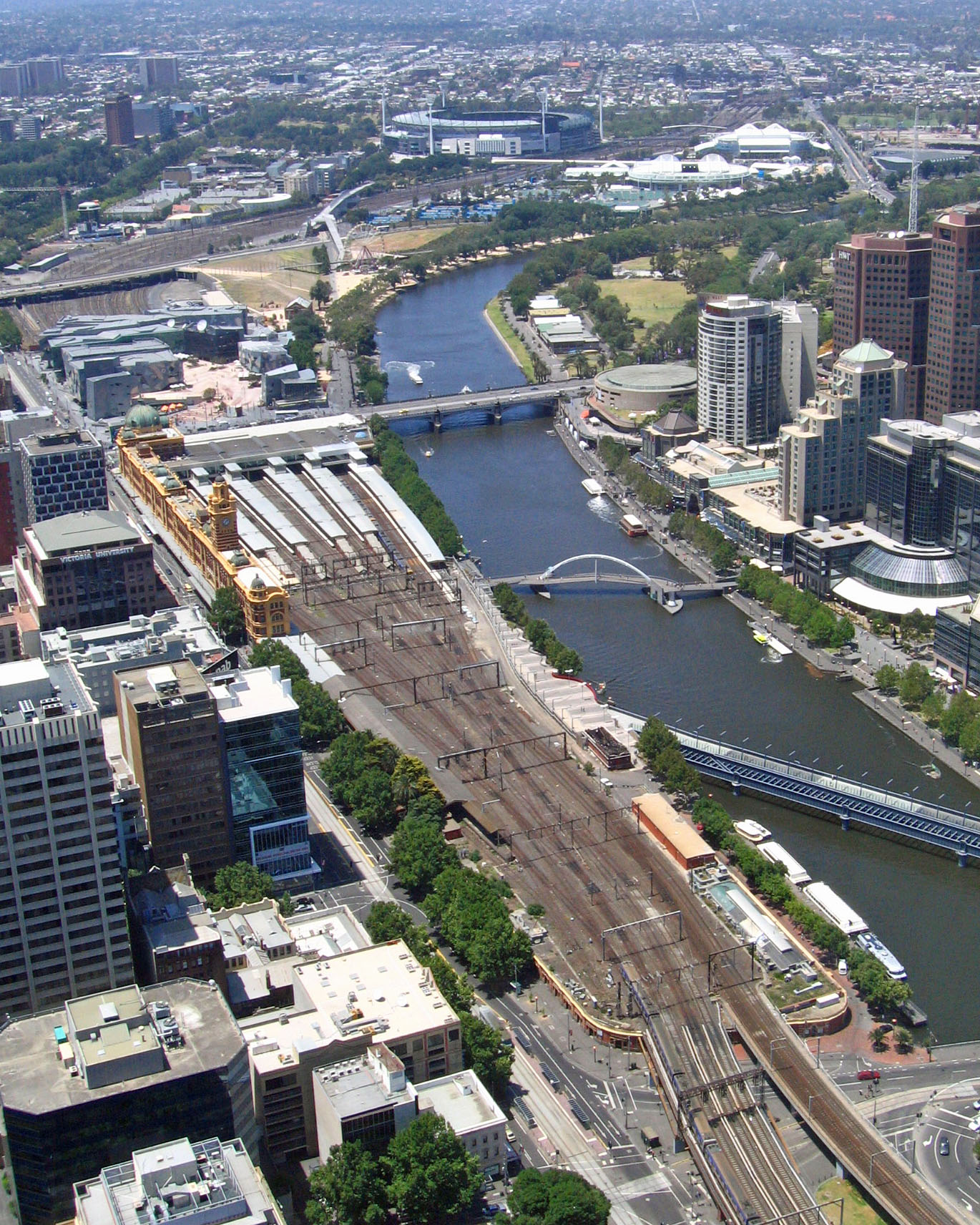
Western approach to Flinders Street station, 2008

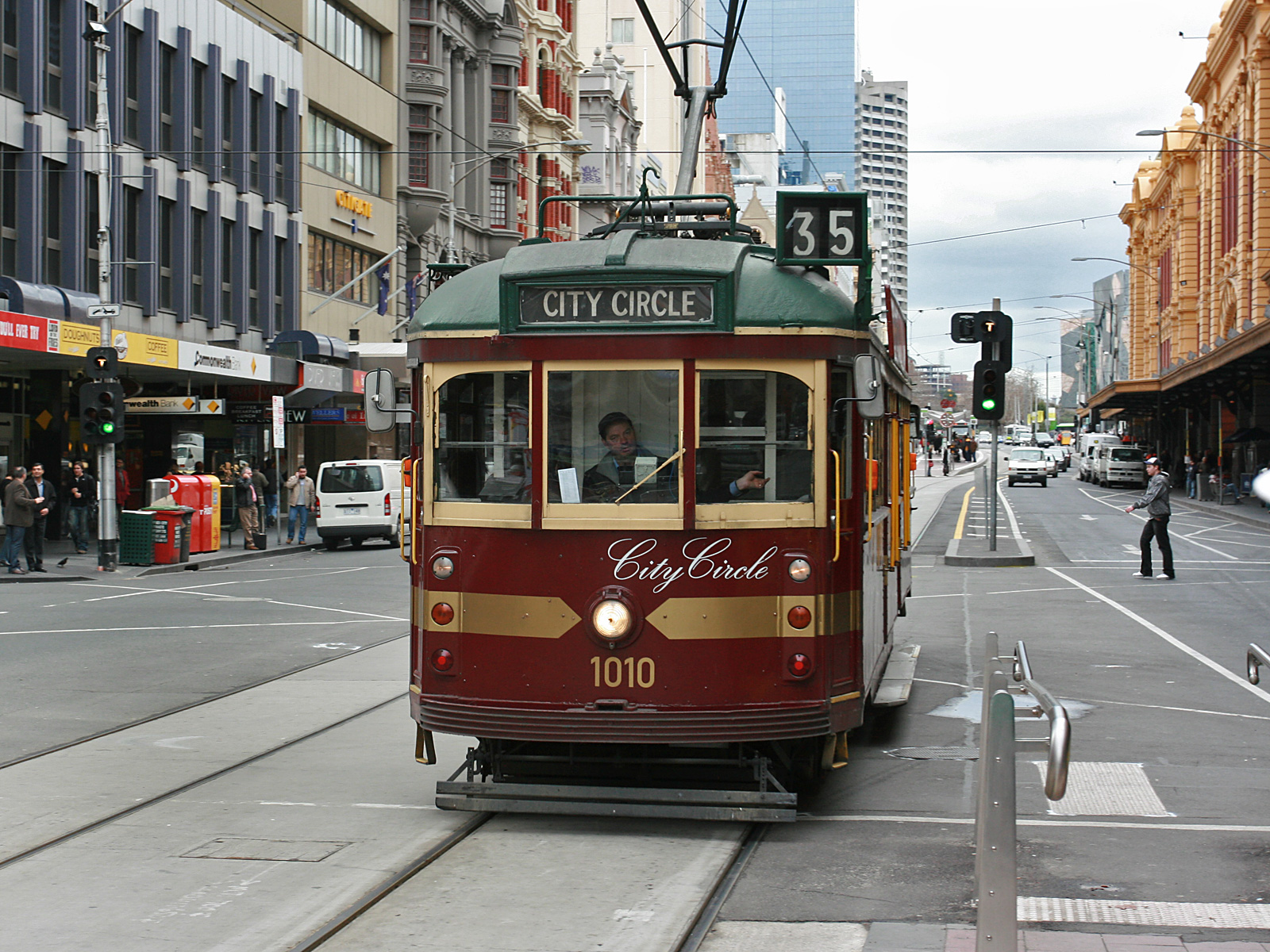
W-class Melbourne tram on the City Circle, August 2008

Passengers can connect at Town Hall station for services on the Sunbury, Cranbourne, and Pakenham lines from Flinders Street using the Degraves Street subway.

Yarra Trams operates 14 services via Flinders Street, Swanston Street and Elizabeth Street:

No.	Route	Stop location	Ref
Melbourne tram route 1	East Coburg – South Melbourne Beach	Swanston Street	
Melbourne tram route 3	Melbourne University – Malvern East	Swanston Street	
Melbourne tram route 5	Melbourne University – Malvern	Swanston Street	
Melbourne tram route 6	Moreland – Glen Iris	Swanston Street	
Melbourne tram route 16	Melbourne University – Kew	Swanston Street	
Melbourne tram route 19	to Coburg North	Elizabeth Street	
City Circle tram	City Circle	Flinders Street	
Melbourne tram route 57	to West Maribyrnong	Elizabeth Street	
Melbourne tram route 59	to Airport West	Elizabeth Street	
Melbourne tram route 64	Melbourne University – Brighton East	Swanston Street	
Melbourne tram route 67	Melbourne University – Carnegie	Swanston Street	
Melbourne tram route 70	Waterfront City Docklands – Wattle Park	Flinders Street	
Melbourne tram route 72	Melbourne University – Camberwell	Swanston Street	
Melbourne tram route 75	Central Pier Docklands – Vermont South	Flinders Street	
