= Fawcett and Ashworth =

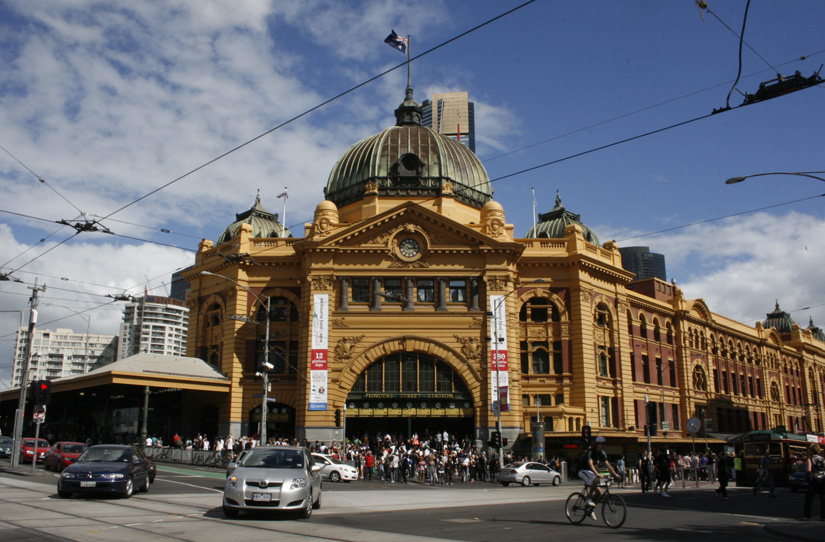
- Flinders Street station

Practice information
- Key architects: J.W. Fawcett, H.P.C. Ashworth
- Founded: 1900

Significant works and honors
- Buildings: Flinders Street station

Fawcett and Ashworth was a design partnership that won the design competition for Flinders Street station in 1899. Flinders Street Station is the only known project the pair worked on together.

== Personal life ==
=== J.W. Fawcett ===
James Fawcett was an English born architect who was first hired by the Victorian Railways in 1889. There he acted as an architectural draftsman, and was most probably involved in the plans for Flinders Street station that had previously been rejected by the Parliamentary Committee.

Fawcett was also a contributor to the Arts and Crafts Movement that was embraced by Australia at the time, and he was also a "foundation member of Australia’s first sculptor’s society – the Yarra Sculptor’s Society".

As a metal worker, Fawcett was also involved with the firm Wunderlich Ltd, who were "Victoria’s major supplier of architectural terracotta and pressed metal architectural features". Fawcett designed the pressed metal ceilings that were heavily incorporated in the construction of Flinders Street station, and can still be seen today throughout the building. His metal work was in the Art Nouveau style, which is also present in his jewelry and clock design.

He also was the Architect for the Frankston Signal box built on 22 August 1922.

=== H.P.C Ashworth ===
Ashworth was born in Australia in 1871. He worked as a civil engineer and was employed by Victorian Railways in the 1890s. He died from illness at the age of 32, in 1903, and so was not involved with the Redding of the station in 1905, or live to see the completion of Flinders Street Station, opened in 1910.

== Notable projects ==
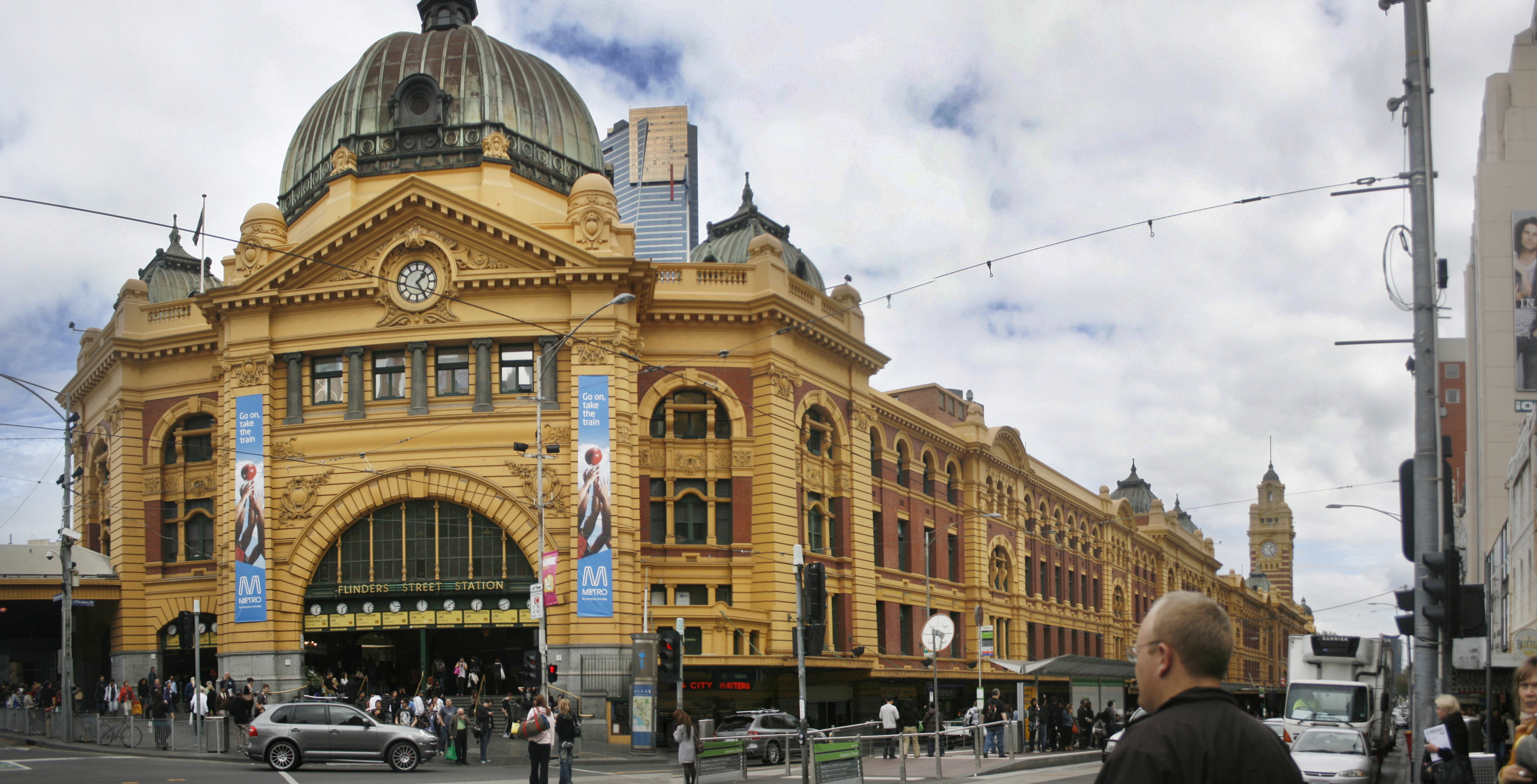
View of Flinders Street station

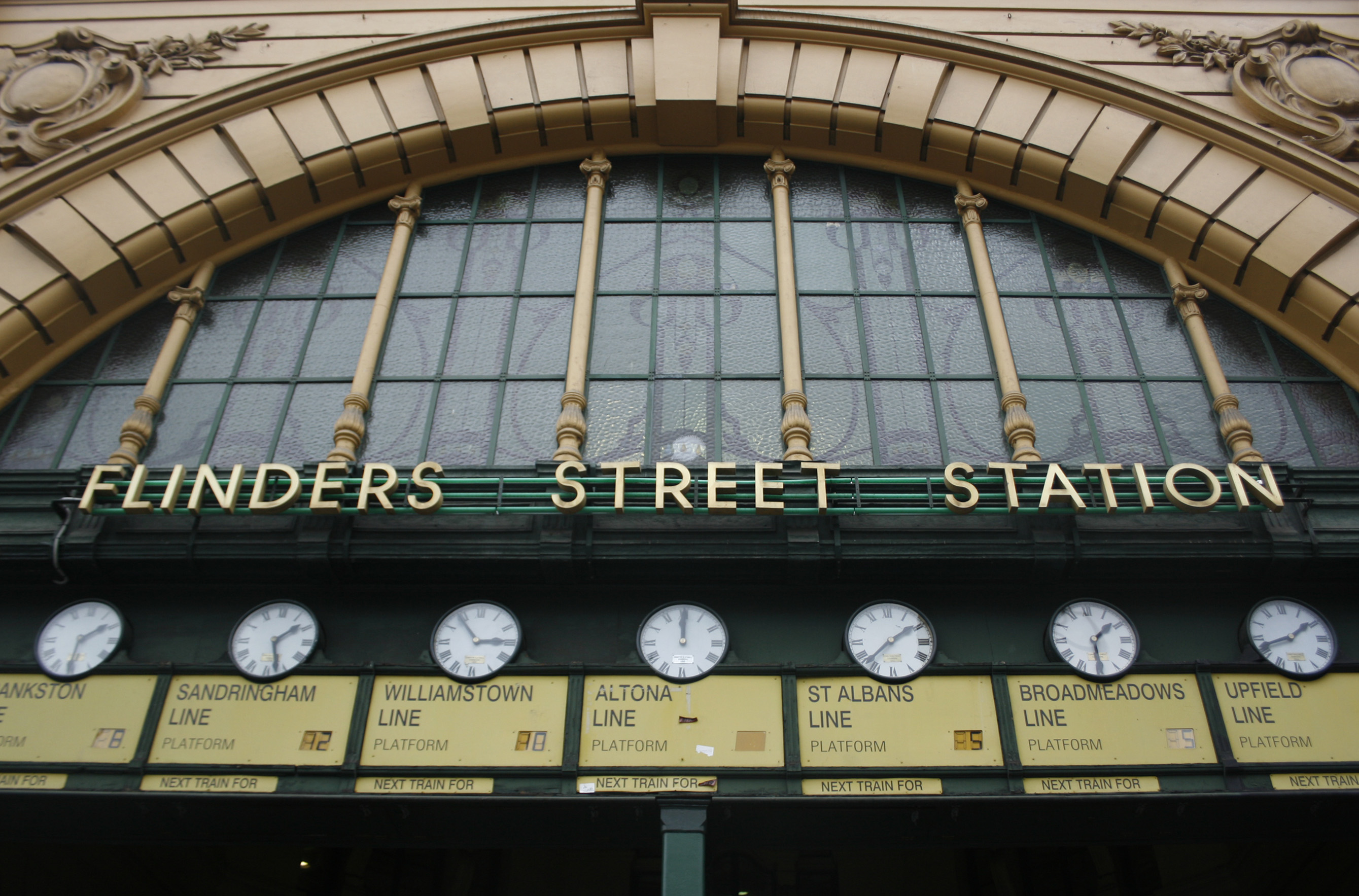
Clocks above main entrance to Flinders Street station

J.W. Fawcett and H.P.C. Ashworth were the winners of a competition held for the detailed design of Melbourne's Flinders Street station. Fawcett and Ashworth's French Renaissance style design, entitled "the Green Light", was one of seventeen entries, with a winning prize of £500 (which at the time was equivalent to a well-paid, two years' wages). Fawcett and Ashworth were both employed by Victorian Railways, and much controversy arose – particularly initiated by the architect of the runner-up entry, Charles D’Ebro – as to having an unfair advantage due to this.

The designers were constrained by the narrow land for the project, and therefore were required to come up with a solution for the design of the façade that broke away from the usual practice of layering it, "bringing forward the more important aspects. The designers claimed they 'broke the building design upwards' instead and attributed more architectural significance to the entrances".

The announcement of the winning entries was made on 22 May 1900, and widely publicised. The judges felt their design adequately addressed all the requirement, and had a more satisfying grandeur than other entries. The French Renaissance style of domes, arches and towers provided a suitable grandeur, which combined with Edwardian and Art Nouveau features made it ultimately unusual in Melbourne (leading to the urban legend that design was intended for Bombay and got mixed up in the post, and comparisons to the Taj Mahal). Much of Fawcett and Ashworth's design is still prevalent today despite the many modifications made after the plans had been selected.

The project well exceeded the initial cost constraint of £102,000 with a total of £265 061, but the outcome proved to be well worth the expense. Flinders Street station became an icon for Melbourne and its famous clocks a meeting point for generations of Melburnians.

== Awards ==
- Winner of 1899 design competition for Flinders Street station

== See also ==
- Architecture of Australia

== Bibliography ==
Fiddian, Marc (2003), Flinders St Station: Melbourne's Taj Mahal, Galaxy Print and Design

Davies, Jenny (2008), Beyond the Façade: Flinders Street, more than just a railway station, Endless Possibilities

The Argus, 21 – 25 May 1900 Edition

The Age, 21 – 25 May 1900 Edition
