= Boronia railway station =

Railway station in Melbourne, Australia

Boronia
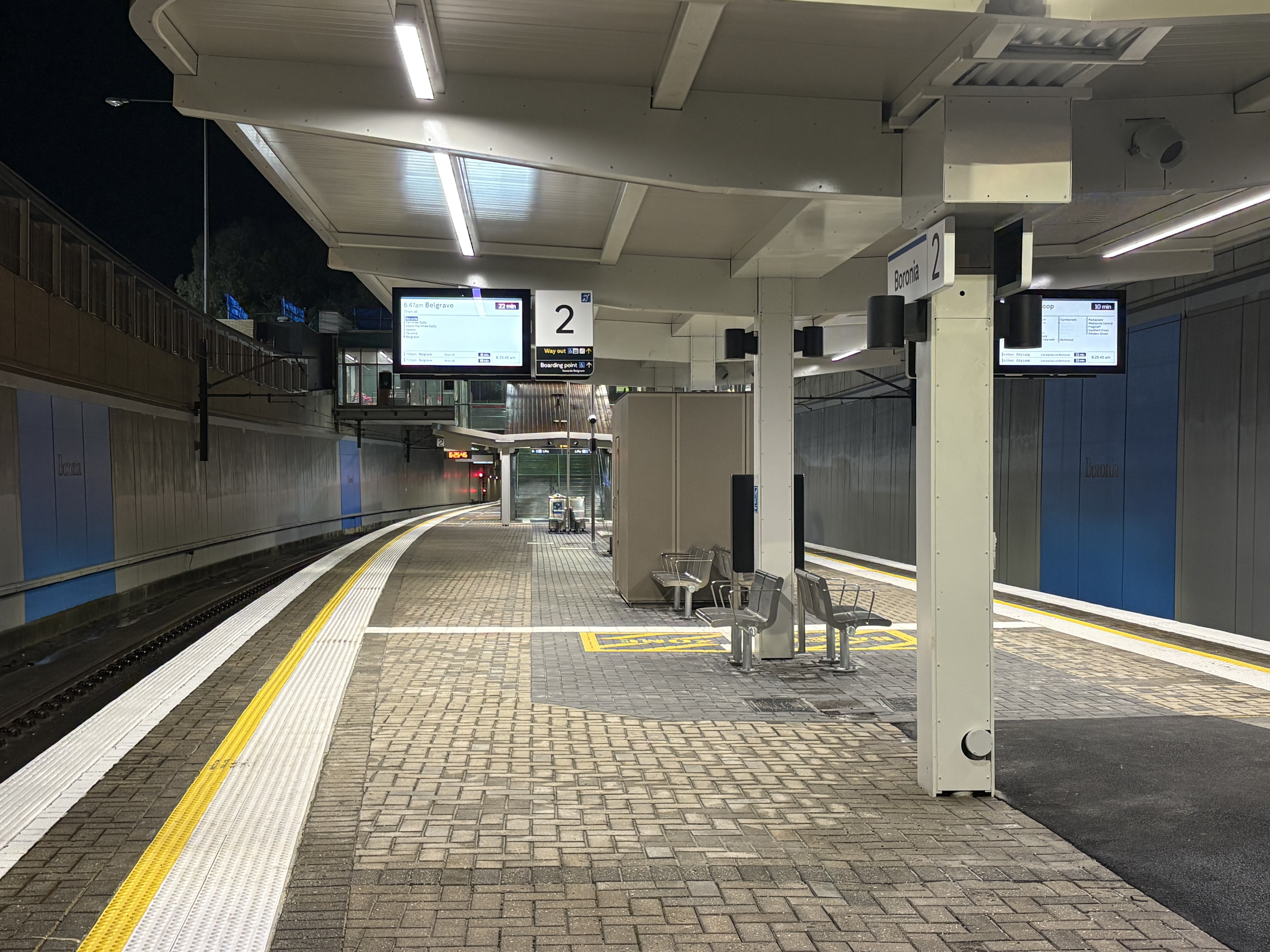
- Eastbound view from Platform 2, August 2026

General information
- Location: Genista Avenue, Boronia, Victoria 3155; City of Knox; Australia
- Coordinates: 37°51′38″S 145°17′04″E
- System: PTV commuter rail station
- Owner: VicTrack
- Operator: Metro Trains
- Line: Belgrave
- Distance: 33.38 kilometres from Southern Cross
- Platforms: 2 (island)
- Tracks: 2
- Connections: Bus

Construction
- Structure type: Below ground
- Parking: 470
- Cycle facilities: 20
- Accessible: Yes — step free access

Other information
- Status: Operational, premium station
- Station code: BOR
- Fare zone: Myki zone 2
- Website: Public Transport Victoria

History
- Opened: 19 June 1920; 106 years ago
- Rebuilt: 1985; 5 November 1998; 4 August 2026
- Electrified: October 1925 (1500 V DC overhead)

Passengers
- 2005–2006: 531,634
- 2006–2007: 557,019 ▲4.77%
- 2007–2008: 627,567 ▲12.66%
- 2008–2009: 617,361 ▼1.62%
- 2009–2010: 617,458 ▲0.015%
- 2010–2011: 682,181 ▲10.48%
- 2011–2012: 680,486 ▼0.24%
- 2012–2013: Not measured
- 2013–2014: 634,434 ▼6.76%
- 2014–2015: 611,736 ▼3.57%
- 2015–2016: 662,488 ▲8.29%
- 2016–2017: 555,828 ▼16.1%
- 2017–2018: 662,629 ▲19.21%
- 2018–2019: 677,517 ▲2.24%
- 2019–2020: 539,350 ▼20.39%
- 2020–2021: 243,500 ▼54.85%
- 2021–2022: 269,450 ▲10.65%
- 2022–2023: 355,950 ▲32.1%
- 2023–2024: 380,550 ▲6.91%
- 2024–2025: 462,850 ▲21.63%

Services
Preceding station	Metro Trains	Following station
Bayswater towards Flinders Street	Belgrave line	Ferntree Gully towards Belgrave
Bayswater towards Ringwood	Belgrave line Shuttle service	Ferntree Gully towards Belgrave
Track layout
Location

Boronia station is a railway station operated by Metro Trains Melbourne on the Belgrave line, part of the Melbourne rail network. It serves the eastern Melbourne suburb of Boronia in Victoria, Australia. Boronia is a below ground premium station, featuring an island platform with two faces. It opened on 19 June 1920, with the current station provided in 1998.

== History ==
Boronia station opened on 19 June 1920. Like the suburb itself, it was named after a suggestion by local councillor Albert Chandler, who grew boronia plants for a nursery he owned nearby.

In 1952, flashing light signals were provided at the former Boronia Road level crossing, which was located in the down direction of the station. In 1957, duplication of the line between Bayswater and Lower Fern Tree Gully occurred, with a second platform provided at the former ground-level station. On 19 December 1959, the station was closed to all goods traffic.

Shops between Lupton Way and Dorset Road were mostly built during the post-war period on land leased from Victorian Railways. The Masaga Group (later known as Hanover Holdings) developed the Railway Arcade in 1969, which is a key pedestrian thoroughfare.

In 1971, boom barriers were provided at the former level crossing. In 1985, the station was rebuilt, and included new station buildings and passenger facilities, as well as an upgrade to the bus interchange facilities. On 2 July 1996, Boronia was upgraded to a premium station.

In 1998, a new below ground station was built, as part of a grade separation project to remove the nearby Boronia Road level crossing. The old station and the level crossing closed on 30 October 1998 with the new station opening on 5 November of that year. With the railway sunk, the Boronia/Dorset Road intersection was rebuilt with Dorset Road intersecting with Boronia Road at a single junction.

After extensive community activism, the Andrews government announced a $60 million upgrade of the station if re-elected at the 2022 state election. Boronia will be decked over to create new open space, as well as better connections to the surrounding shopping strips. The decking will also create direct pedestrian access from the car park to the Dorset Road shops, making it easier to get around central Boronia. The station facilities will undergo a major overhaul with building upgrades, improved lighting, CCTV, platform upgrades, accessibility upgrades and new furniture to create a modern station. The bus interchange will also receive new shelters, seating and signage.

Construction on the station upgrade began in December 2025 with the construction of site offices and worker ammenities as well as service works. Major construction began in March 2026 with the demolition of two shops to allow space for the future station plaza. At this time, Lupton Way was also closed at the station to allow for construction of one of the new station buildings. Boronia station itself closed temporarily on 8 May 2026, with all trains skipping the station to allow for construction to take place within the station concourse and platforms. During the closure, a free shuttle bus was provided between Bayswater station and Ferntree Gully station. During the station's closure, it was upgraded with additional platform shelters, revamped lighting and upgraded station accessibility with a widened concourse. The upgraded station reopened on 4 August 2026, with a new accessible entrance from Erica Avenue at the western end of station, while finalising works expected to continue into September 2026.

== Platforms and services ==
Boronia has one island platform with two faces. It is served by Belgrave line trains.

Boronia platform arrangement
Platform	Line	Destination	Via	Service Type	Notes	Source
1	Belgrave line	Flinders Street	City Loop	All stations and limited express services	See City Loop for operating patterns.	
1	Belgrave line	Ringwood		All stations	Shuttle service: Operates after 7pm + before 10am on weekends. Alternates with Flinders Street services.	
2	Belgrave line	Upper Ferntree Gully, Belgrave		All stations and limited express services		

== Transport links ==
Ventura Bus Lines operates six routes via Boronia station, under contract to Public Transport Victoria:

- 690 : to Croydon station
- 691 : to Waverley Gardens Shopping Centre
- 737 : Croydon station – Monash University Clayton Campus
- 745B : to Bayswater station
- 753 : Glen Waverley station – Bayswater station
- 755 : Bayswater station – Westfield Knox

== Gallery ==
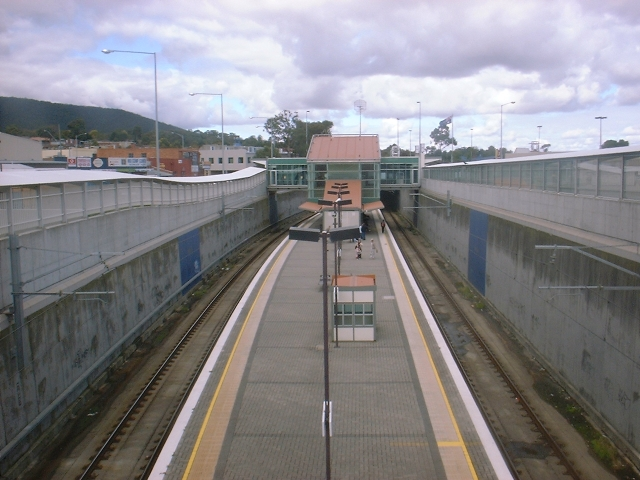
Southbound view from northern station concourse looking over platforms,
April 2006

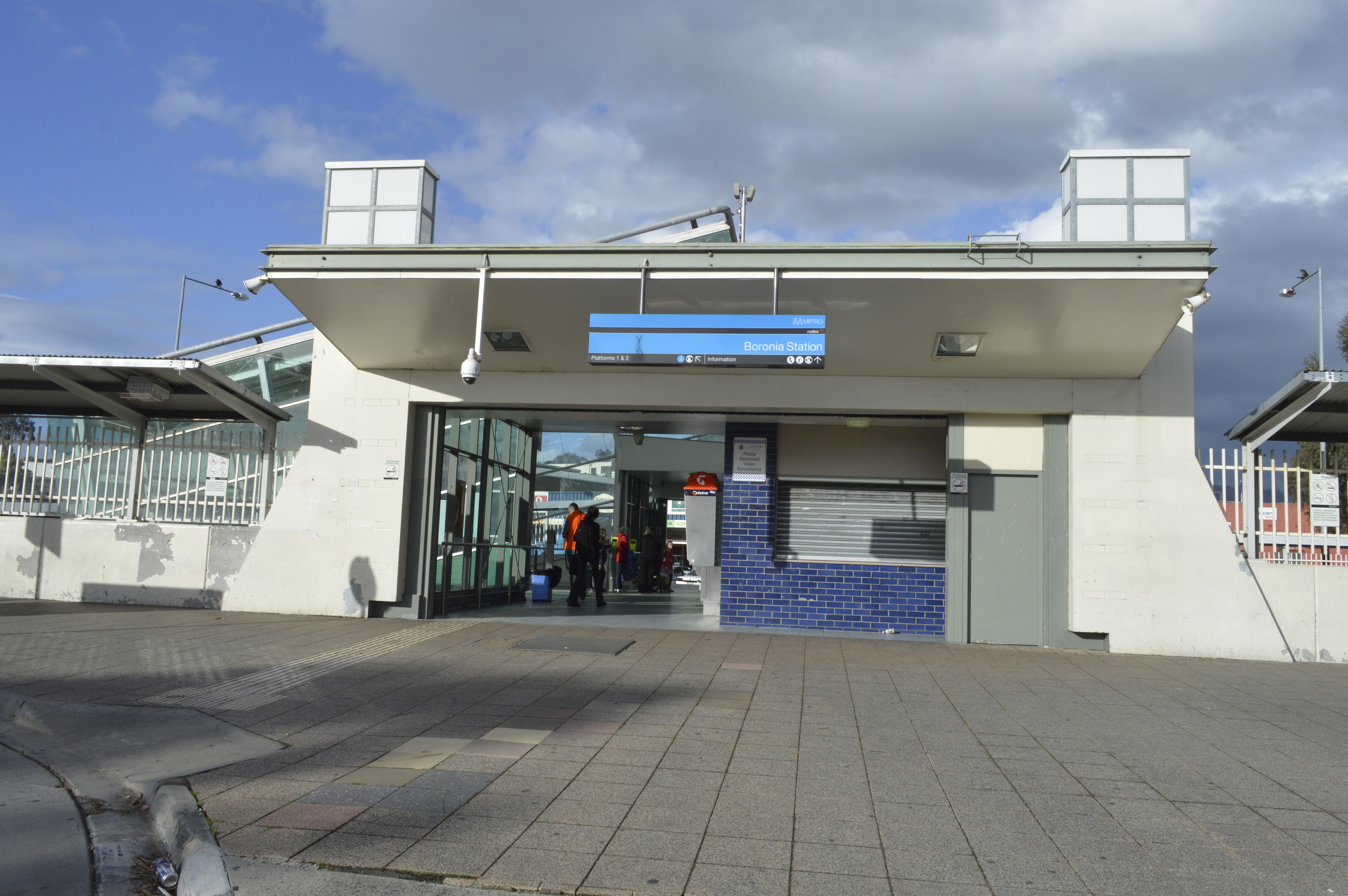
Station entrance, concourse and forecourt from the bus interchange, September 2013

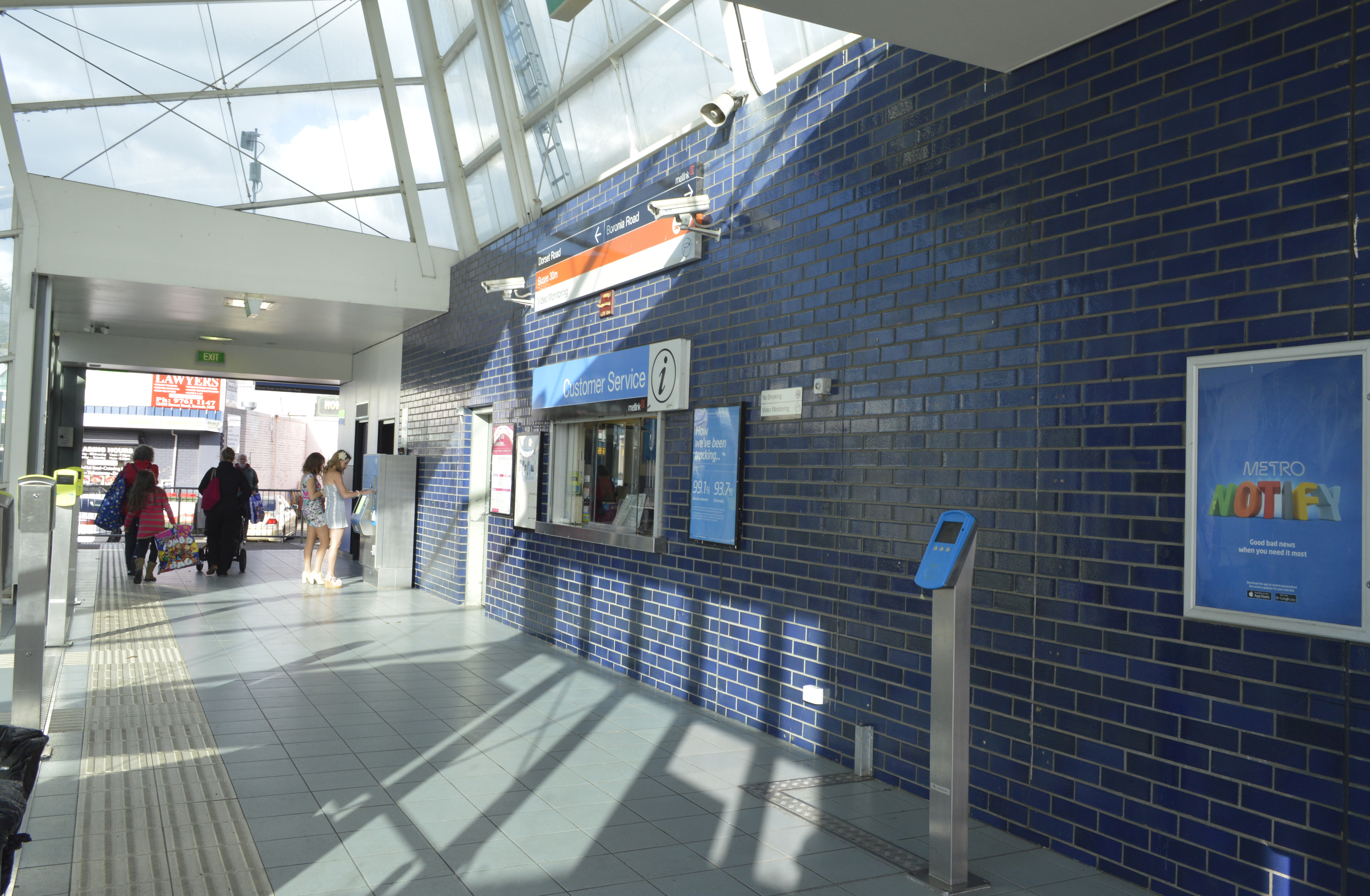
The station's concourse, showing the customer service office,
September 2013

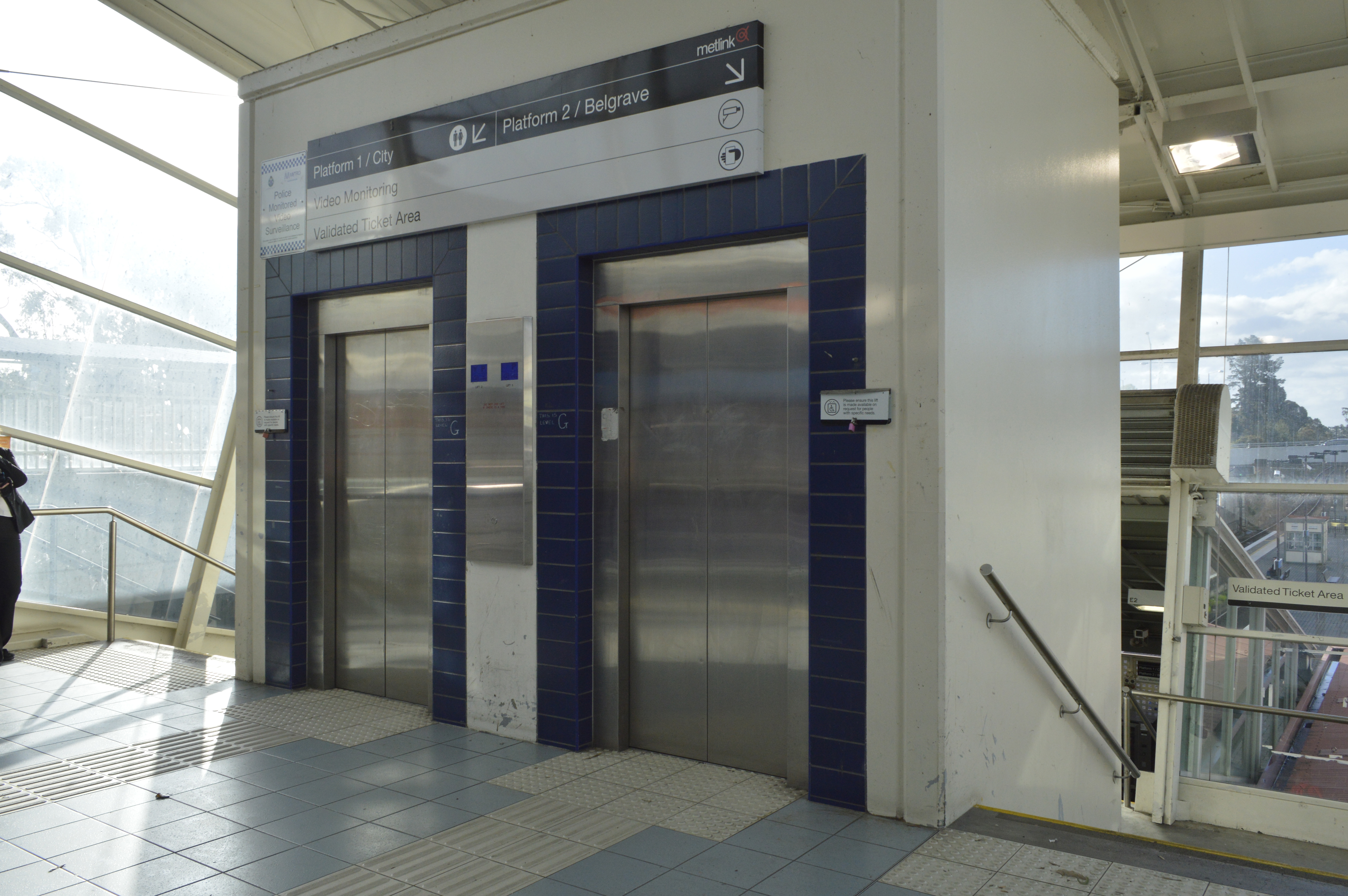
Station lifts from concourse leading to the enclosed waiting room,
September 2013

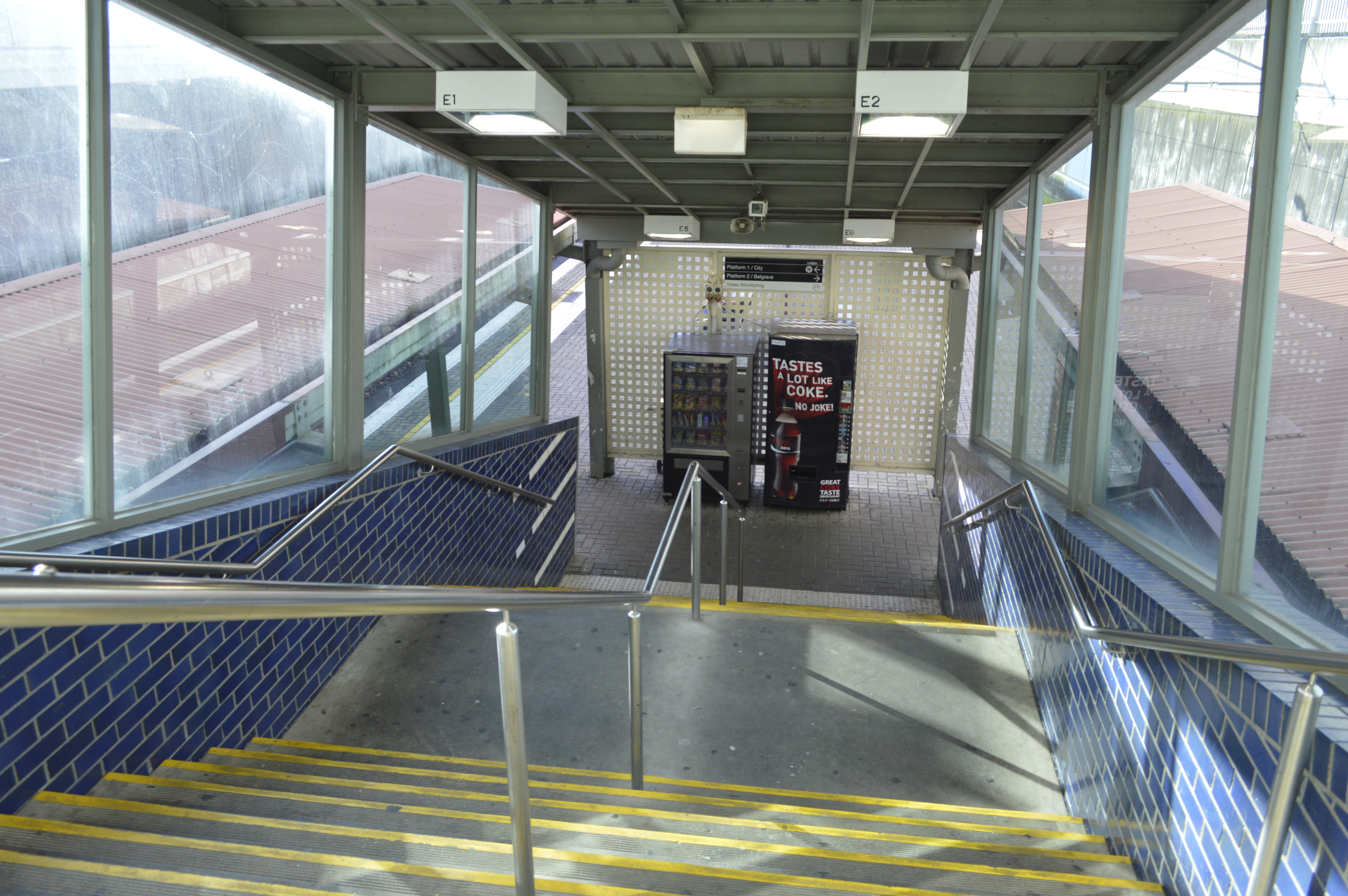
Station stairs from concourse leading to the platforms, September 2013

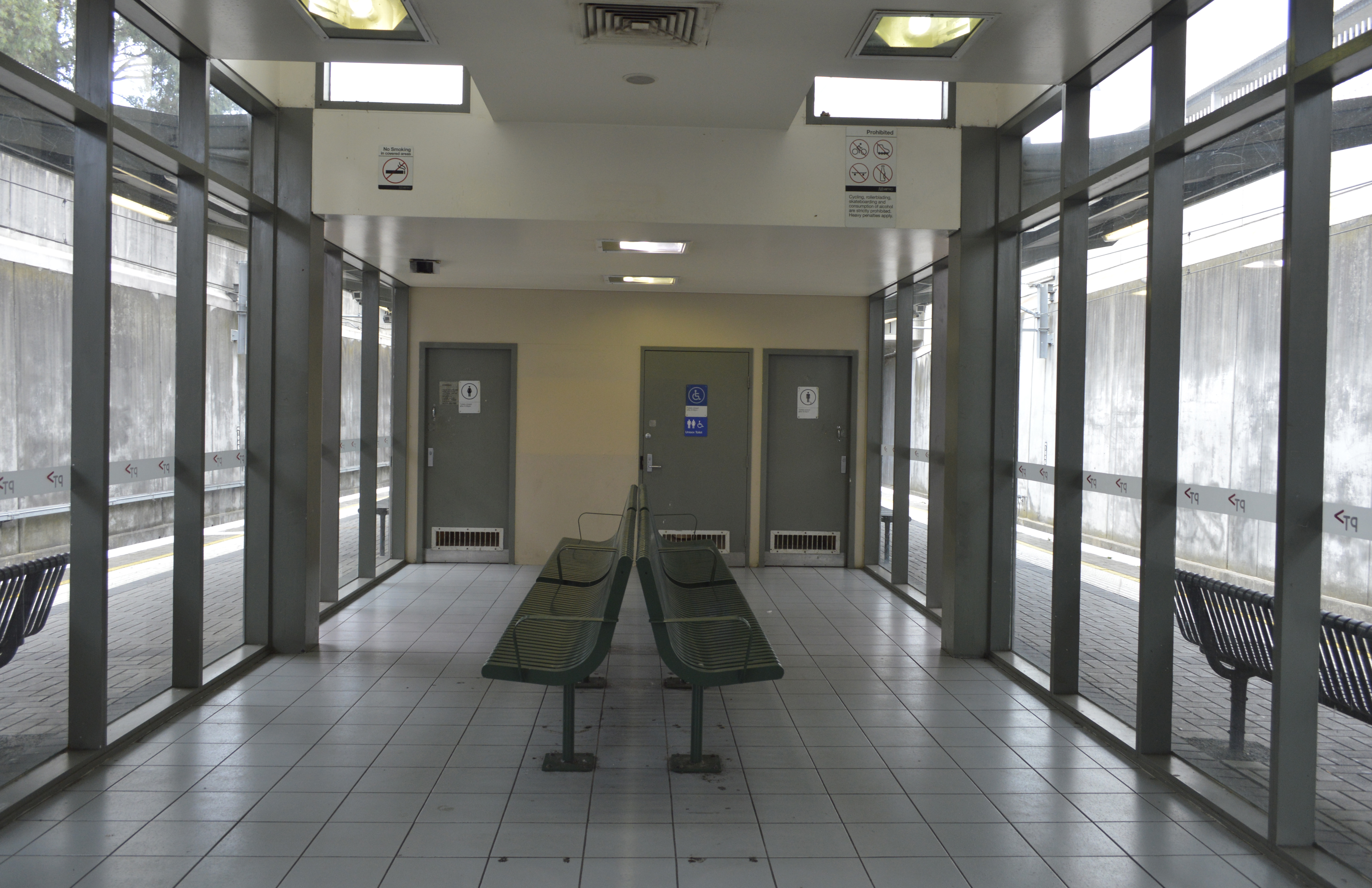
The station's waiting room at the platforms, January 2014
