= Bayswater railway station, Melbourne =

Railway station in Melbourne, Australia

Bayswater
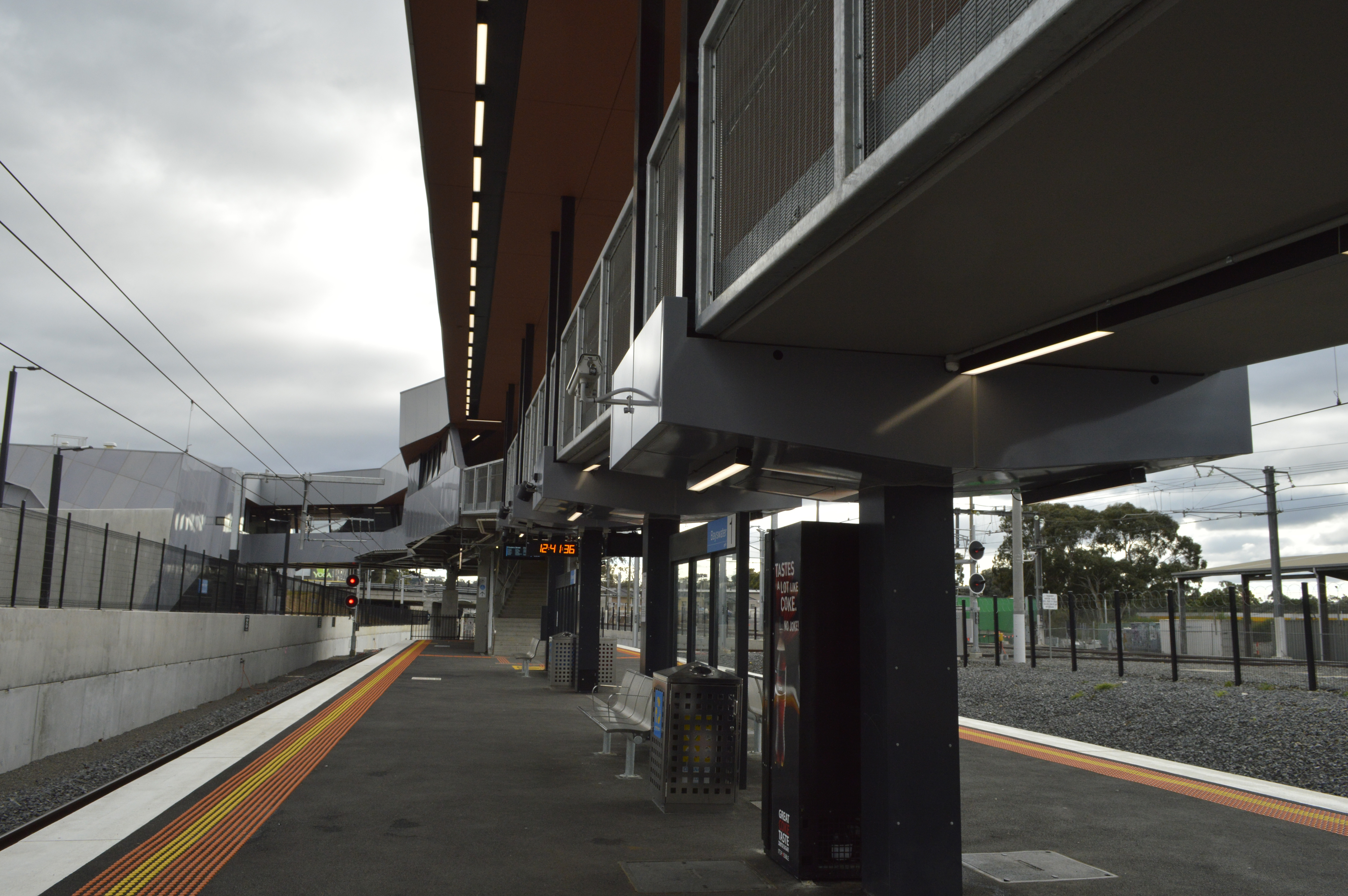
- Northbound view from Platform 1, July 2017

General information
- Location: Station Street, Bayswater, Victoria 3153; City of Knox; Australia
- Coordinates: 37°50′30″S 145°16′05″E
- System: PTV commuter rail station
- Owner: VicTrack
- Operator: Metro Trains
- Line: Belgrave
- Distance: 30.84 kilometres from Southern Cross
- Platforms: 2 (1 island)
- Tracks: 2
- Connections: Bus

Construction
- Structure type: Below ground
- Parking: 370
- Cycle facilities: Yes
- Accessible: Yes

Other information
- Status: Operational, premium station
- Station code: BAY
- Fare zone: Myki zone 2
- Website: Public Transport Victoria

History
- Opened: 4 December 1889; 136 years ago
- Rebuilt: 1977; 12 December 2016 (LXRP)
- Electrified: October 1925 (1500 V DC overhead)
- Former names: Macauley (during construction)

Passengers
- 2005–2006: 367,793
- 2006–2007: 401,323 ▲9.11%
- 2007–2008: 484,888 ▲20.82%
- 2008–2009: 492,183 ▲1.5%
- 2009–2010: 505,117 ▲2.62%
- 2010–2011: 537,507 ▲6.41%
- 2011–2012: 511,001 ▼4.93%
- 2012–2013: Not measured
- 2013–2014: 496,818 ▼2.77%
- 2014–2015: 498,517 ▲0.34%
- 2015–2016: 520,716 ▲4.45%
- 2016–2017: 325,164 ▼37.55%
- 2017–2018: 492,729 ▲51.53%
- 2018–2019: 538,029 ▲9.19%
- 2019–2020: 417,400 ▼22.42%
- 2020–2021: 213,500 ▼48.85%
- 2021–2022: 263,750 ▲23.53%
- 2022–2023: 329,600 ▲24.96%
- 2023–2024: 385,400 ▲16.93%
- 2024–2025: 446,150 ▲15.76%

Services
Preceding station	Metro Trains	Following station
Heathmont towards Flinders Street	Belgrave line	Boronia towards Belgrave
Heathmont towards Ringwood	Belgrave line Shuttle service	Boronia towards Belgrave
Track layout
Location

Bayswater station is a railway station operated by Metro Trains Melbourne on the Belgrave line, part of the Melbourne rail network. It serves the eastern Melbourne suburb of Bayswater in Victoria, Australia. Bayswater is a below ground premium station, featuring an island platform with two faces. It opened on 4 December 1889, with the current station provided in December 2016.

== History ==
Bayswater station opened on 4 December 1889, when the railway line from Ringwood was extended to Upper Ferntree Gully. Like the suburb itself, the station was named after Bayswater House, a large property owned by bookmaker and publisher James John Miller. The property itself was named after Miller's birthplace in London. During construction, the station was known as Macaulay, which was the name of a nearby post office.

In 1957, duplication of the line between Bayswater and Lower Fern Tree Gully occurred.

In 1970, boom barriers were provided at the former Mountain Highway level crossing, which was located in the up direction of the station. In 1977, the former ground-level station building was provided.

On 19 December 1982, the former ground-level island platform was provided, as part of the duplication of the line between Bayswater and Ringwood. In that year, boom barriers were provided at the nearby Scoresby Road level crossing, in the down direction from the station.

Bayswater was once the destination for freight services conveying cement, with the last train operating on 24 June 1987, after which the traffic was relocated to Lyndhurst, near Dandenong.

In April 1998, a train maintenance centre and stabling facilities opened adjacent to the station, as part of the replacement of the Jolimont Yard. The buildings are approximately 2,850 m^{2} in size, and permit bogie repair and replacement, and under-carriage and overhead work. In that year, a signal panel at the station was abolished and moved to Ringwood. In 2001, Bayswater was upgraded to a premium station.

In 2016 as part of the Level Crossing Removal Project, level crossings were removed from either side of the station, at Mountain Highway and Scoresby Road, and in conjunction with the grade separation, a new station was built below ground level. The ground level station was closed on 15 October 2016 and subsequently demolished; on 12 December 2016, the new station opened to passengers.

== Platforms and services ==
Bayswater has one island platform with two faces. It is served by Belgrave line trains.

Bayswater platform arrangement
Platform	Line	Destination	Via	Service Type	Notes	Source
1	Belgrave line	Ringwood, Flinders Street	City Loop	All stations and limited express services	See City Loop for operating patterns	
2	Belgrave line	Upper Ferntree Gully, Belgrave		All stations and limited express services		

== Transport links ==
Ventura Bus Lines operates eight routes via Bayswater station, under contract to Public Transport Victoria:

- 664 : Chirnside Park Shopping Centre – Westfield Knox
- 745B : to Boronia station
- 745C : to Wantirna Primary School
- 745D : to Wantirna Primary School
- 753 : to Glen Waverley station
- 755 : to Westfield Knox
- Night Bus 967 : Glen Waverley station – Croydon station (Saturday and Sunday mornings only)

== Gallery ==
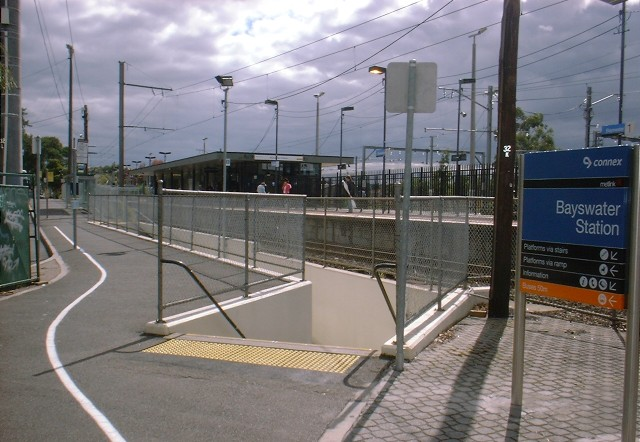
Former ground-level station entrance, April 2006, prior to the 2016 rebuild.

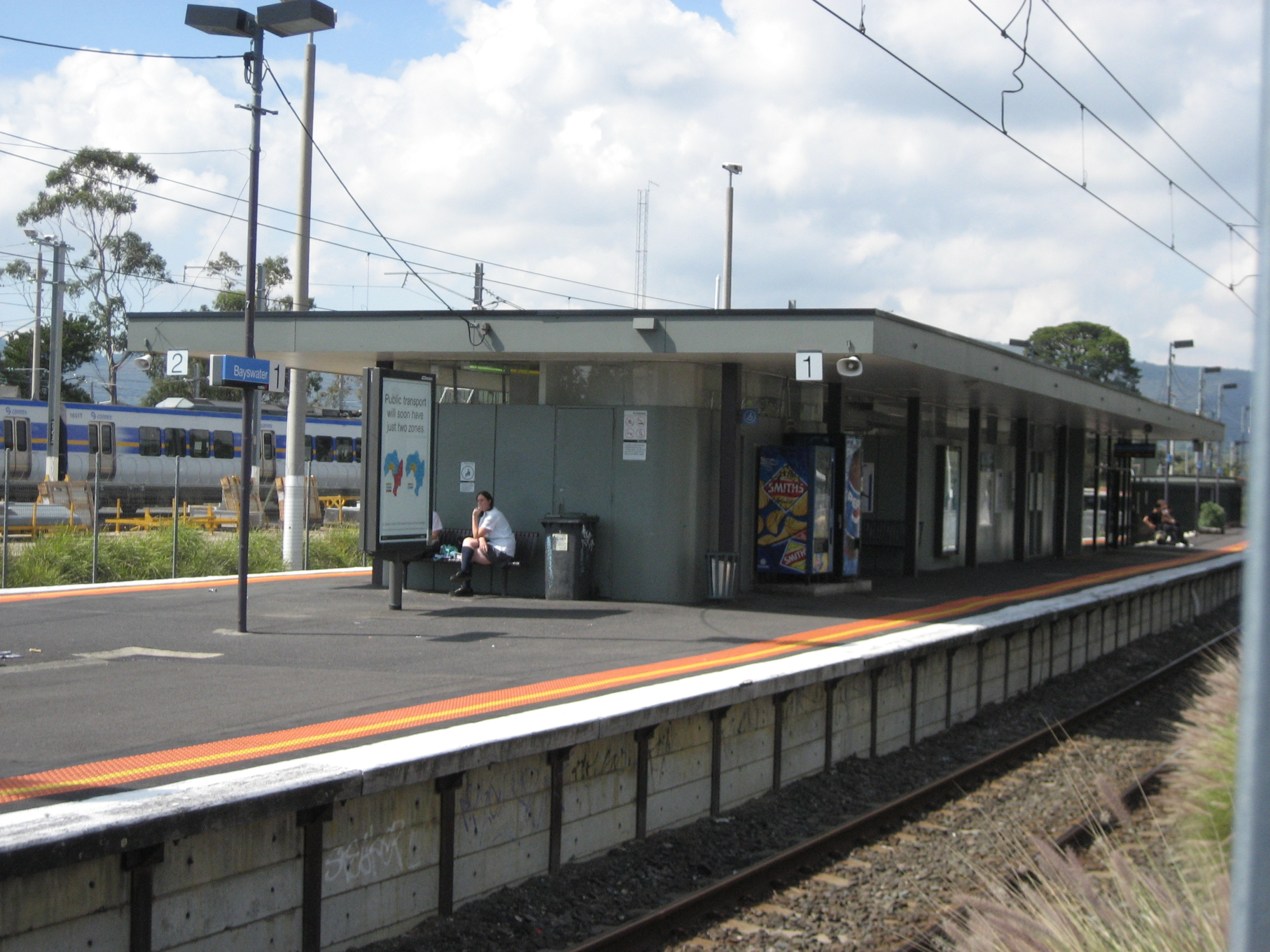
Southbound view of the former ground-level station, March 2007. The train maintenance depot is in the background.

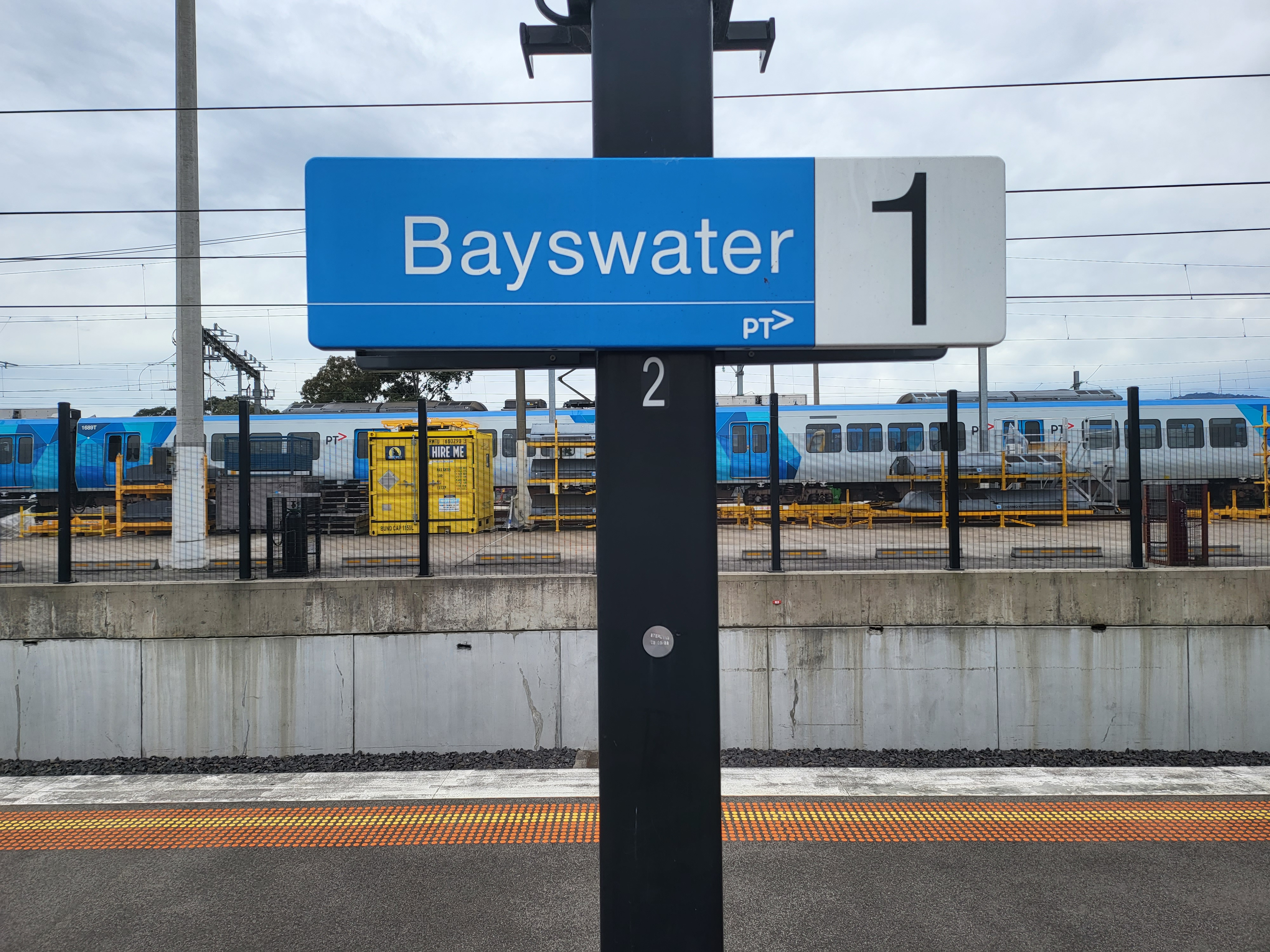
Platform 1 signage, November 2022. The train maintenance depot is in the background.
