= Belgrave line =

Passenger rail service in metropolitan Melbourne, Victoria, Australia

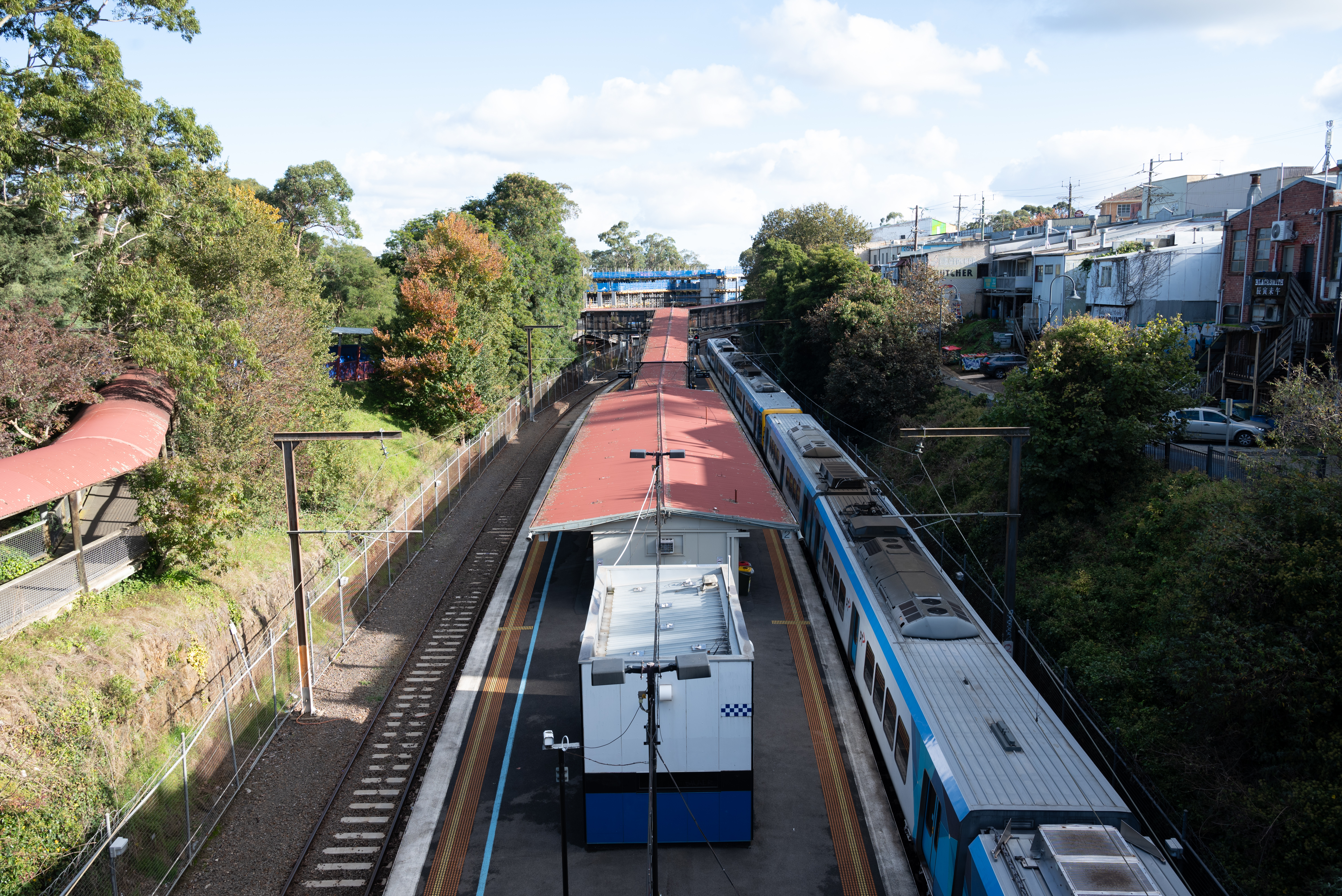
- Belgrave station, the terminus of the Belgrave line, with an X'Trapolis 100 train on Platform 2, May 2023. This station provides an interchange with heritage railway Puffing Billy.

Overview
- Service type: Commuter rail
- System: Melbourne railway network
- Status: Operational
- Locale: Melbourne, Victoria, Australia
- First service: 4 December 1889; 136 years ago
- Current operator: Metro Trains
- Former operators: Victorian Railways (VR) (1889–1974); VR as VicRail (1974–1983); MTA (The Met) (1983–1989); PTC (The Met) (1989–1998); Hillside Trains (1998–2000); Connex Melbourne (2000–2009)
- Website: Official website

Route
- Termini: Flinders Street; Belgrave
- Stops: 31 (including City Loop stations)
- Distance travelled: 41.386 km (25.716 mi)
- Average journey time: 1 hour 7 minutes (not via City Loop)
- Service frequency: 15–30 minutes weekdays peak; 30 minutes weekdays off-peak; 20 minutes weekend daytime; 30 minutes nights; 60 minutes early weekend mornings; Double frequency between Flinders Street and Ringwood in combination with Lilydale line; Extra services run between Flinders Street and either Blackburn or Ringwood on weekdays

Technical
- Rolling stock: X'Trapolis 100
- Track gauge: 1,600 mm (5 ft 3 in)
- Electrification: 1500 V DC overhead
- Track owner: VicTrack

The Belgrave line is a commuter railway line on the Melbourne metropolitan railway network serving the city of Melbourne in Victoria, Australia. Operated by Metro Trains Melbourne, the line is coloured dark blue and is one of the four lines that constitute the Burnley group. It is the city's fourth-longest metropolitan railway line at 41.8 kilometres (26.0 mi). The line runs from Flinders Street station in central Melbourne to Belgrave station in the city's east, serving 31 stations via Burnley, Box Hill, Ringwood, and Upper Ferntree Gully. Beyond Belgrave, the narrow-gauge line has been restored as the Puffing Billy Railway, which runs tourist services to the original terminus of Gembrook.

The line operates for approximately 19 hours a day (from approximately 5:00 am to around 12:00 am) with 24 hour service available on Friday and Saturday nights. During peak hours, headways of up to 15 minutes are operated, with services every 20–30 minutes during off-peak hours. Trains on the Belgrave line run in a two three-car formations of X'Trapolis 100 trainsets.

Sections of the Belgrave line opened as early as 1889, with the line fully extended and re-gauged to Belgrave by 1962. The line was built to connect Melbourne and Ringwood with the rural towns of Bayswater, Boronia, Upper Ferntree Gully, and Belgrave, among others.

Since the 2010s, due to the heavily utilised infrastructure of the Belgrave line, significant improvements and upgrades have been made. Different packages of work have upgraded the corridor to replace sleepers, upgraded signalling technology, introduced new rolling stock, and removed seven of the nine remaining level crossings.

== History ==
=== 19th century ===
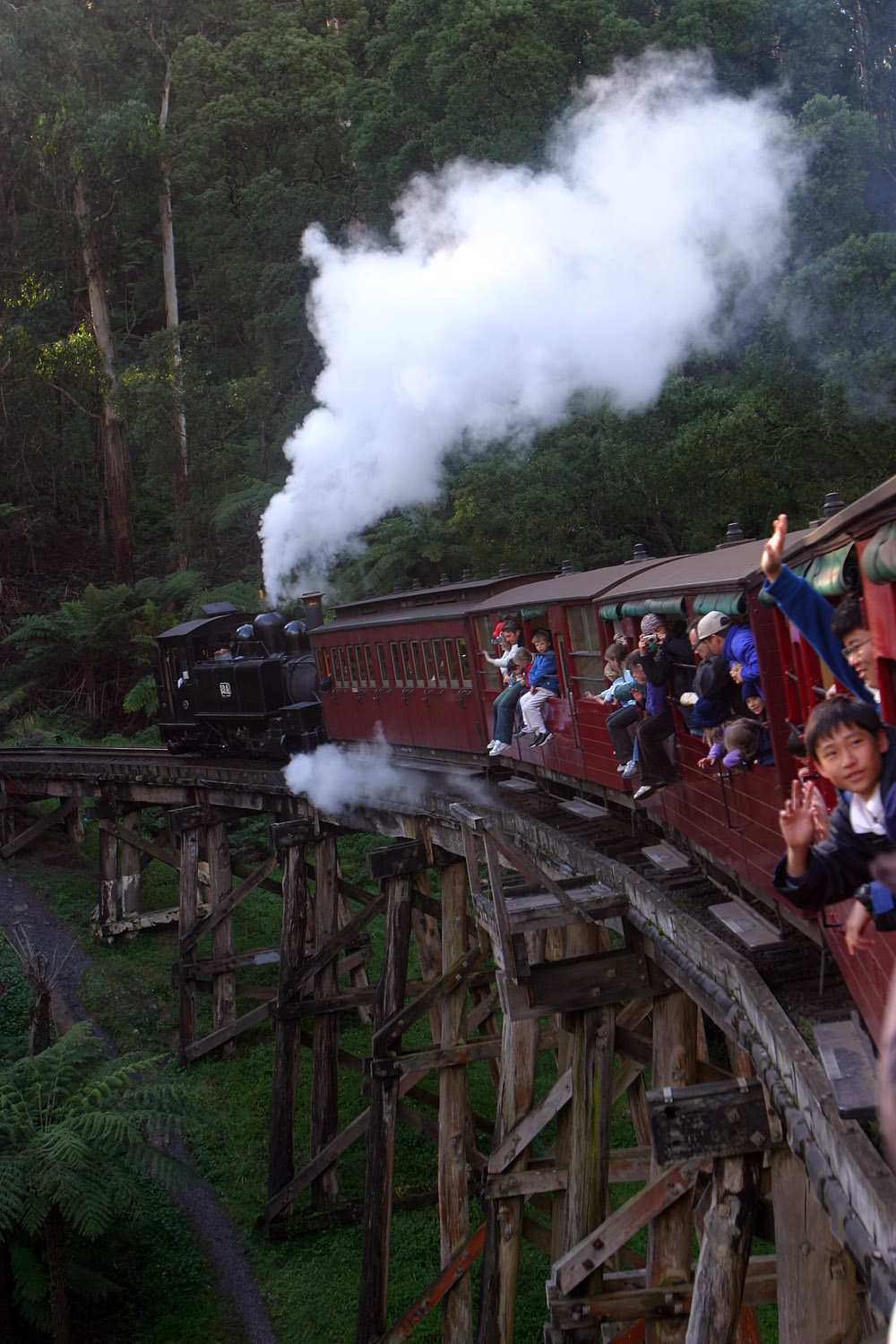
The Monbulk Creek trestle bridge remains a feature of the Gembrook line, now used for the Puffing Billy tourist line

A rail branch was constructed from Ringwood to Upper Ferntree Gully in December 1889. A narrow-gauge 762 mm (2 ft 6 in) line was opened from Upper Ferntree Gully to Gembrook station in December 1900, the second of four experimental narrow-gauge lines built by the Victorian Railways. These two lines would become joined and standardised to form the Belgrave railway line in the 20th century.

=== 20th century ===
In 1921, the narrow-gauge section from Upper Ferntree Gully to Belgrave was converted to automatic signalling, the first such instance on single track in the Southern Hemisphere. This section was then reverted to Staff and Ticket safeworking in 1930. Electrification of the railway to Upper Ferntree Gully was implemented in November 1925.

Following a landslide in 1953, the narrow-gauge line was formally closed in April 1954, although services resumed as far as Belgrave for some "farewell specials", and then for the Puffing Billy Preservation Society until services ceased again in February 1958.

The line was partly duplicated between Bayswater and Lower Ferntree Gully (now Ferntree Gully) in February 1957.

The closing of the narrow-gauge line to Gembrook enabled the first stage of its planned rebuilding to Emerald as part of the suburban electrified system to proceed. This first stage, as far as Belgrave, of the new, broad-gauge, electrified extension opened in February 1962. It initially operated on the Staff and Ticket system but was converted to automatic signalling in March 1964, with the section from Ferntree Gully to Upper Ferntree Gully being converted the following day. Ringwood to Bayswater was converted to automatic signalling in June 1974, as was Bayswater to Ferntree Gully in July 1977. In December 1982, Ringwood -Bayswater was duplicated.

The Comeng trains were introduced to the Melbourne railway system in 1981, alongside the opening of the City Loop. Initially, along with the Belgrave line, they were only allowed to operate on the Alamein, Dandenong, Glen Waverley and Lilydale lines due to the trains 3.05-metre width.

=== 21st century ===
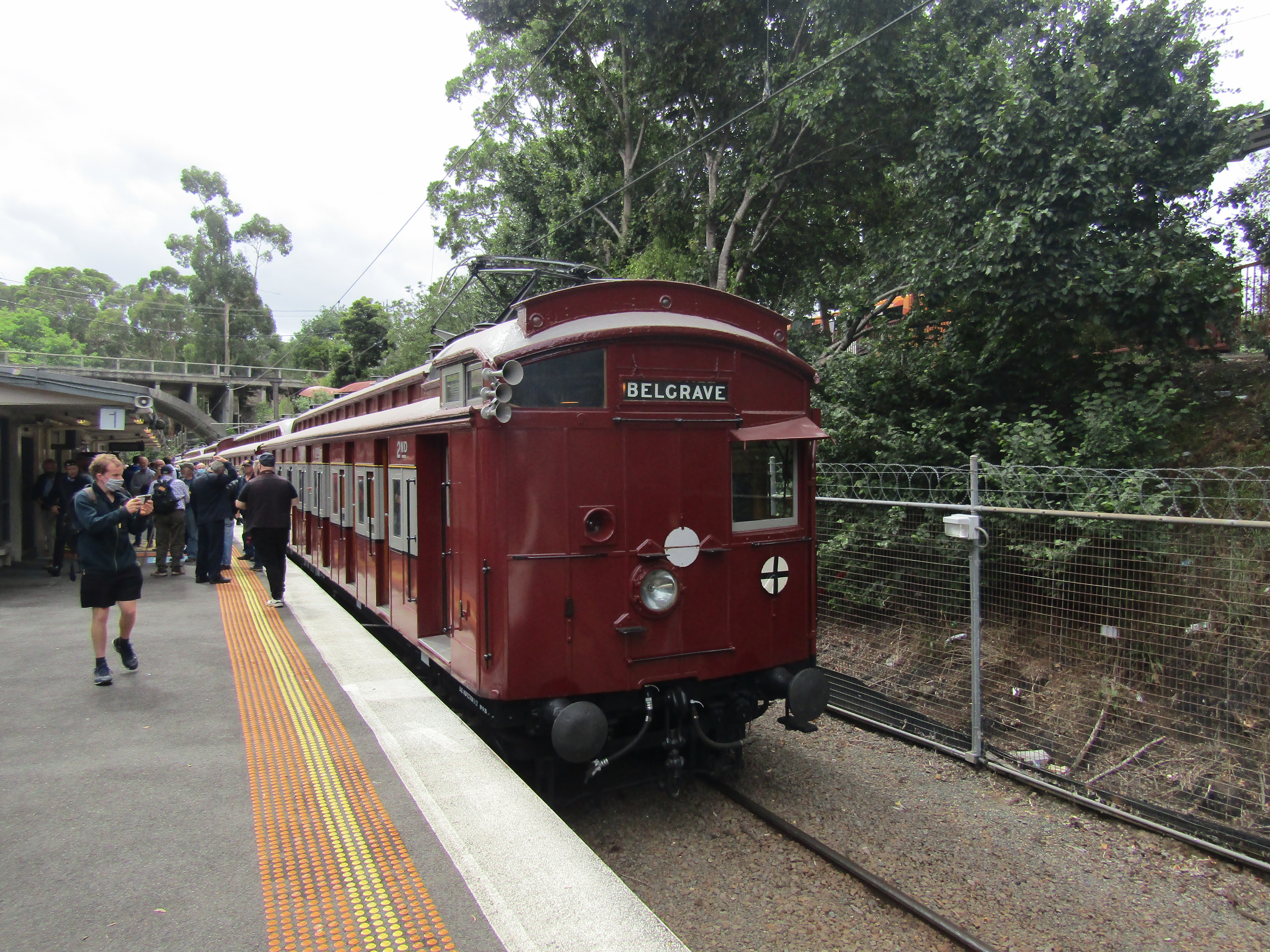
A preserved Victorian Railways Tait train at Belgrave station on 8 March 2022.

A 2007 restructure of train ticketing in Melbourne involved the removal of Zone 3, with these stations being re-classified to Zone 2. This brought the cost of train fares down, improving system accessibility for the public.

In April 2016, plans to potentially run a regular revenue Tait set service on the Belgrave line was announced. This came following La Trobe MP Jason Wood's push for the idea as part of the greater "Puffing Billy master plan". The Tait service would be aimed at tourists visiting Puffing Billy. In November 2016, $1 million was committed to restoring a Tait set currently stored at the Newport Workshops. The Tait service was expected to originate at Flinders Street station as a direct service to Belgrave bypassing the City Loop. No such service was ever made.

== Future ==
=== Level Crossing Removals ===
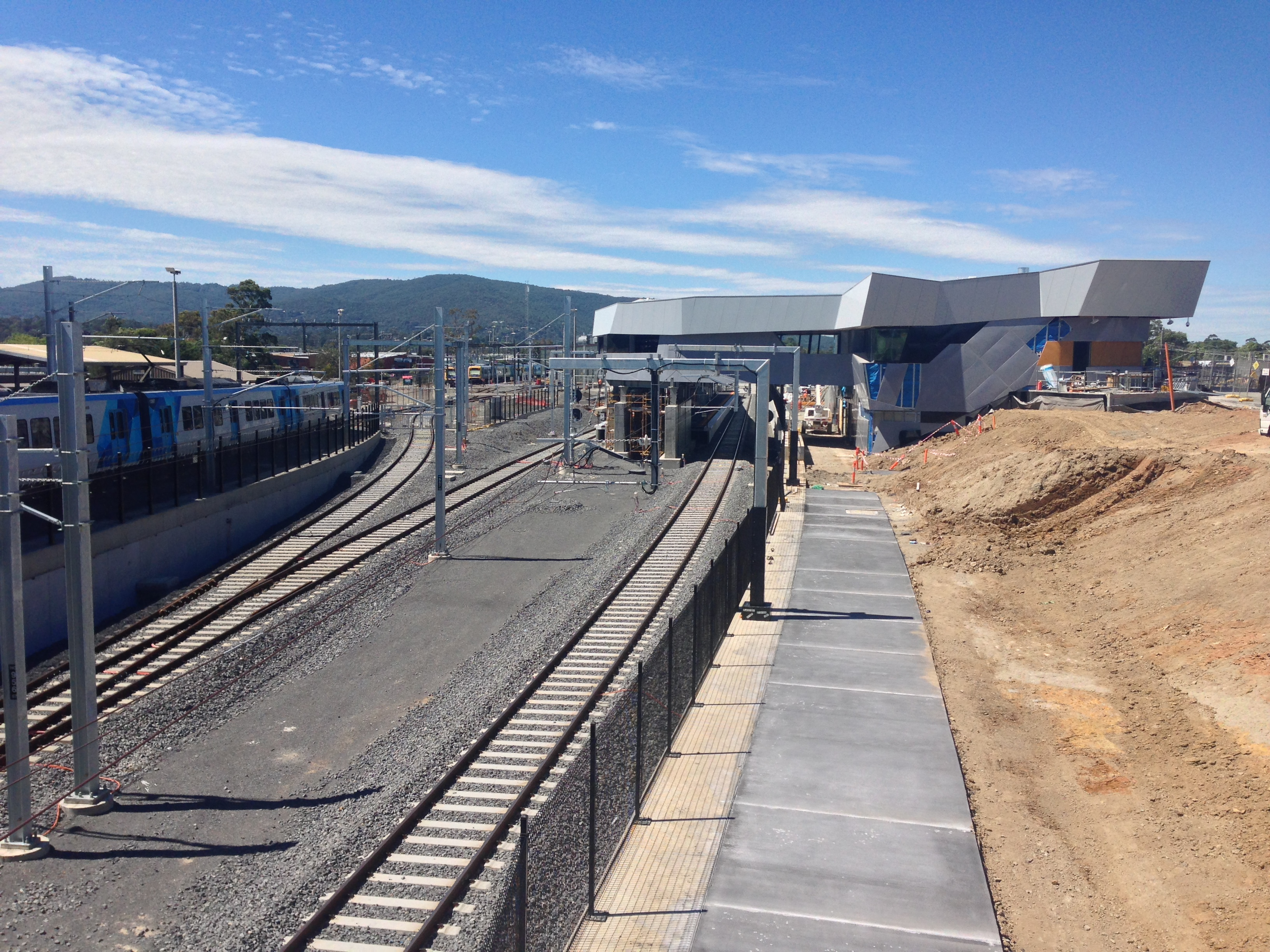
The rebuilt Bayswater station viewed from the removed level crossing.

The Level Crossing Removal Project has announced the removal of seven level crossings between the city and Ferntree Gully station, to be completed in stages from 2016 to 2025. In 2016, two level crossings were removed at Mountain Highway and Scoresby Road, Bayswater, through lowering the rail line under the road. These two removals also included a rebuilt Bayswater station and upgraded stabling facilities. A further two crossings were removed at Blackburn Road, Blackburn, and Heatherdale Road, Ringwood in January 2017. Both of these removals also involved lowering the rail line under the road, with a rebuilt Heatherdale station built as part of the project. Union and Mont Albert Roads were also been removed by lowering the rail line in May 2023. The removals also included closing Mont Albert and Surrey Hills stations, with a new station built in-between called "Union." The final crossing to be removed on the corridor was at Bedford Road in Ringwood by also lowering the rail line, completed in March 2024. At the conclusion of these removals, only two crossings remain: Alpine Street and Railway Avenue, both between Ferntree Gully and Upper Ferntree Gully.

== Network and operations ==
=== Services ===
Services on the Belgrave line operates from approximately 5:00 am to around 12:00 daily. In general, during peak hours, train frequency is ~7 minutes on the Ringwood corridor (combined with the Lilydale line) and 15 minutes in the AM peak on the Belgrave Line while during non-peak hours the frequency is reduced to 20–30 minutes throughout the entire route. On Friday nights and weekends, services run 24 hours a day, with 60 minute frequencies available outside of normal operating hours.

Train services on the Belgrave line are also subjected to maintenance and renewal works, usually on selected Fridays and Saturdays. Shuttle bus services are provided throughout the duration of works for affected commuters.

==== Stopping patterns ====
Legend — Station status

- ◼ Premium Station – Station staffed from first to last train
- ◻ Host Station – Usually staffed during morning peak, however this can vary for different stations on the network.

Legend — Stopping patterns
Some services do not operate via the City Loop

- ● – All trains stop
- ◐ – Some services do not stop
- ▼ – Only outbound trains stop
- ▲ – Only inbound trains stop
- | – Trains pass and do not stop

Belgrave Services
Station	Zone	Local	Ltd Express	Blackburn	Ringwood	Upper Ferntree Gully	Shuttle
◼ Flinders Street	1	●	●	●	●	●	
◼ Southern Cross	1	◐	◐	◐	◐	●	
◼ Flagstaff	1	◐	◐	◐	◐	●	
◼ Melbourne Central	1	◐	◐	◐	◐	●	
◼ Parliament	1	◐	◐	◐	◐	●	
◼ Richmond	1	●	●	●	●	●	
East Richmond	1	▲	|	◐	◐	|	
◼ Burnley	1	●	|	◐	◐	|	
Hawthorn	1	●	|	◐	◐	|	
◼ Glenferrie	1	●	◐	●	●	▼	
◻ Auburn	1	●	|	◐	◐	|	
◼ Camberwell	1	●	◐	●	●	▼	
East Camberwell	1	●	◐	●	●	|	
Canterbury	1/2	●	◐	●	●	|	
Chatham	1/2	●	◐	●	●	|	
◼ Union	1/2	●	◐	●	●	|	
◼ Box Hill	2	●	●	●	●	●	
Laburnum	2	●	◐	◐	◐	▼	
◼ Blackburn	2	●	●	●	●	●	
◼ Nunawading	2	●	◐		●	●	
◼ Mitcham	2	●	●		●	●	
◻ Heatherdale	2	●	◐		●	●	
◼ Ringwood	2	●	●		●	●	●
Heathmont	2	●	◐			●	●
◼ Bayswater	2	●	●			●	●
◼ Boronia	2	●	●			●	●
◼ Ferntree Gully	2	●	◐			●	●
◼ Upper Ferntree Gully	2	●	●			●	●
Upwey	2	●	◐				●
Tecoma	2	●	◐				●
◼ Belgrave	2	●	●				●

=== Operators ===
The Belgrave line has had a total of 6 operators since its opening in 1889. The majority of operations throughout its history have been government run: from its first service in 1889 until the 1999 privatisation of Melbourne's rail network, four different government operators have run the line. These operators, Victorian Railways, the Metropolitan Transit Authority, the Public Transport Corporation, and Hillside Trains have a combined operational length of 110 years. Hillside Trains was privatised in August 1999 and later rebranded Connex Melbourne. Metro Trains Melbourne, the current private operator, then took over the operations in 2009. Both private operators have had a combined operational period of 27 years.

Past and present operators of the Belgrave line:
Operator	Assumed operations	Ceased operations	Length of operations
Victorian Railways	1889	1983	94 years
Metropolitan Transit Authority	1983	1989	6 years
Public Transport Corporation	1989	1998	9 years
Hillside Trains (government operator)	1998	1999	1 years
Connex Melbourne	1999	2009	10 years
Metro Trains Melbourne	2009	incumbent	16 years (ongoing)

=== Route ===
Interactive map of the Belgrave line in eastern Melbourne (click to view)

Belgrave (physical track)

Overview
- Status: Operational with passenger services from Flinders Street to Belgrave
- Owner: Victorian Railways (VR) (1890–1974); VR as VicRail (1974–1983); MTA (The Met) (1983–1989); PTC (The Met) (1989–1997); VicTrack (1997–Current)
- Locale: Melbourne, Victoria, Australia
- Termini: Flinders Street; Belgrave
- Continues as: Gembrook (narrow gauge)
- Connecting lines: All metropolitan, regional, and interstate; Gembrook
- Former connections: Kew; Outer Circle
- Stations: 31 current stations; 5 former stations

Service
- Services: Belgrave

History
- Work began: 4 December 1889
- Opened: Princes Bridge to Richmond on 8 February 1859; To Pic-nic on 24 September 1860; To Hawthorn on 13 April 1861; Flinders Street to Princes Bridge on 18 December 1865; Hawthorn to Camberwell on 3 April 1882; To Ringwood on 1 December 1882; To Upper Ferntree Gully on 4 December 1889; To Belgrave as narrow gauge on 18 December 1900
- Completed: 18 February 1962
- Reopen: Upper Ferntree Gully to Belgrave as broad gauge on 18 February 1962
- Electrified: Flinders Street to Box Hill on 19 December 1922; To Ringwood on 30 January 1923; To Upper Ferntree Gully on 12 October 1925; To Belgrave on 18 February 1962
- Closed: Upper Ferntree Gully to Belgrave as narrow gauge on 30 April 1954

Technical
- Line length: 41.8 km (25.97 mi)
- Num of tracks: Twelve tracks: Flinders Street to Richmond; Four tracks: Richmond to Burnley; Triple track: Burnley to Box Hill; Double track: Box Hill to Ferntree Gully; Single track: Ferntree Gully to Belgrave (passing loops at Upper Ferntree Gully and Upwey)
- Track gauge: 1,600 mm (5 ft 3 in)
- Old gauge: Upper Ferntree Gully to Belgrave: 2 ft 6 in (762 mm)
- Electrification: 1500 V DC overhead
- Operating speed: 80 km/h (50 mph) – Electric|
- Signalling: Automatic block signalling
- Maximum incline: 1 in 30 (3.33%)

The Belgrave line forms a mostly curved route from the Melbourne central business district to its terminus in Belgrave. The route is 41.8 kilometres (26.0 mi) long and predominantly double-tracked, however, between Flinders Street station and Richmond, the track is widened to 12 tracks, narrowing to 4 tracks between Richmond and Burnley before narrowing to 3 tracks between Burnley and Box Hill. Finally, the line narrows to two tracks between Box Hill and Ferntree Gully before narrowing to a single track to its terminus. After Ferntree Gully, passing loops and island platforms are present at Upper Ferntree Gully, Upwey, and Belgrave. After departing from its terminus at Flinders Street, the Belgrave line traverses both flat and hilly country, with some curves (more towards the end of the line) and fairly significant earthworks for parts of the line. Sections of the line have been elevated or lowered into a cutting to eliminate level crossings. Despite some removals, there are a small number of level crossings still present, with no current plans to remove them.

The line follows the same alignment as the Alamein, Glen Waverley, and Lilydale lines, with the four services splitting onto different routes at Burnley. The Alamein, Belgrave, and Lilydale services continue till the Alamein line splits off at Camberwell, with the two services continuing together till Ringwood. After departing Ringwood station, the Belgrave line heads south, with the Lilydale line heading in an eastern direction. Almost all of the rail line goes through built-up suburbs, however, the rail line becomes peri-urban towards its terminus in Belgrave.

=== Stations ===
The line serves 31 stations across the 49-kilometre (30-mile)-long track. The stations are a mix of elevated, lowered, underground, and ground level designs. Underground stations are present in the City Loop and Box Hill, with the majority of elevated and lowered stations being constructed as part of level crossing removals.

Station	Accessibility	Opened	Terrain	Train connections	Other connections
Flinders Street	Yes—step free access	1854	Lowered	13 connections: * Alamein line; Craigieburn line; Flemington Racecourse line; Frankston line; Gippsland line; Glen Waverley line; Hurstbridge line; Lilydale line; Mernda line; Sandringham line; Upfield line; Werribee line; Williamstown line	Trams Buses
Southern Cross	Yes—step free access	1859	Ground level	25 connections: * Alamein line; Albury line; Ararat line; Ballarat line; Bendigo line; Craigieburn line; Echuca line; Flemington Racecourse line; Frankston line; Geelong line; Gippsland line; Glen Waverley line; Hurstbridge line; Lilydale line; Maryborough line; Mernda line; NSW TrainLink Southern; Seymour line; Shepparton line; Swan Hill line; The Overland; Upfield line; Warrnambool line; Werribee line; Williamstown line	Trams Buses Coaches SkyBus
Flagstaff	Yes—step free access	1985	Underground	8 connections: * Alamein line; Craigieburn line; Frankston line; Glen Waverley line; Hurstbridge line; Lilydale line; Mernda line; Upfield line	Trams
Melbourne Central	Yes—step free access	1981	Underground	8 connections: * Alamein line; Craigieburn line; Frankston line; Glen Waverley line; Hurstbridge line; Lilydale line; Mernda line; Upfield line	Trams Buses
Parliament	Yes—step free access	1983	Underground	8 connections: * Alamein line; Craigieburn line; Frankston line; Glen Waverley line; Hurstbridge line; Lilydale line; Mernda line; Upfield line	Trams
Richmond	No—steep ramp	1859	Elevated	6 connections: * Alamein line; Frankston line; Gippsland line; Glen Waverley line; Lilydale line; Sandringham line	Trams Buses
East Richmond	Yes—step free access	1860	Ground level	3 connections: Alamein line; Glen Waverley line; Lilydale line	Trams
Burnley	No—steep ramp	1880	Ground level	3 connections: Alamein line; Glen Waverley line; Lilydale line	Trams
Hawthorn	No—steep ramp	1881	Lowered	2 connections: Alamein line; Lilydale line	Trams Buses
Glenferrie	No—steep ramp	1882	Elevated	2 connections: Alamein line; Lilydale line	Trams
Auburn	No—steep ramp	1882	Ground level	2 connections: Alamein line; Lilydale line	Buses
Camberwell	No—steep ramp	1882	Lowered	2 connections: Alamein line; Lilydale line	Trams Buses
East Camberwell	No—steep ramp	1900	Ground level	1 connection: Lilydale line	
Canterbury	No—steep ramp	1882	Elevated	1 connection: Lilydale line	Buses
Chatham	No—steep ramp	1927	Ground level	1 connection: Lilydale line	
Union	Yes—step free access	2023	Lowered	1 connection: Lilydale line	Buses
Box Hill	Yes—step free access	1882	Underground	1 connection: Lilydale line	Trams Buses Coaches
Laburnum	Yes—step free access	1958	Elevated	1 connection: Lilydale line	Buses
Blackburn	Yes—step free access	1882	Ground level	1 connection: Lilydale line	Buses
Nunawading	Yes—step free access	1888	Lowered	1 connection: Lilydale line	Buses Coaches
Mitcham	Yes—step free access	1882	Lowered	1 connection: Lilydale line	Buses
Heatherdale	Yes—step free access	1958	Lowered	1 connection: Lilydale line	Buses
Ringwood	Yes—step free access	1882	Ground level	1 connection: Lilydale line	Buses Coaches
Heathmont	Yes—step free access	1926	Ground level		Buses
Bayswater	Yes—step free access	1889	Lowered		Buses
Boronia	Yes—step free access	1920	Lowered		Buses
Ferntree Gully	Yes—step free access	1889	Ground level		Buses
Upper Ferntree Gully	No—steep ramp	1889	Ground level		Buses
Upwey	No—steep ramp	1901	Ground level		Buses
Tecoma	No—steep ramp	1924	Ground level		Buses
Belgrave	No—steep ramp	1900	Ground level		Buses

Station histories
Station	Opened	Closed	Age	Notes
Parliament	22 January 1983		43 years	
Melbourne Central	26 January 1981		45 years	Formerly Museum
Flagstaff	27 May 1985		41 years	
Southern Cross	17 January 1859		167 years	Formerly Batman's Hill; Formerly Spencer Street
Flinders Street	12 September 1854		172 years	Formerly Melbourne Terminus
Princes Bridge	8 February 1859	1 October 1866	7 years	
Princes Bridge	2 April 1879	30 June 1980	101 years	
Botanic Gardens	2 March 1859	c. April 1862	Approx. 3 years	
Punt Road	8 February 1859	12 December 1859	10 months	Replaced by Swan Street (200m further along line)
Richmond	12 December 1859		166 years	Formerly Swan Street
East Richmond	24 September 1860		166 years	Formerly Church Street
Burnley	1 May 1880		146 years	Formerly Burnley Street
Pic Nic	24 September 1860	6 October 1895	35 years	
Hawthorn	13 April 1861		165 years	
Glenferrie	3 April 1882		144 years	Formerly Glenferrie Road
Auburn	3 April 1882		144 years	Formerly Auburn Road
Camberwell	3 April 1882		144 years	
East Camberwell	14 May 1900		126 years	
Canterbury	1 December 1882		143 years	
Chatham	1 April 1927		99 years	
Surrey Hills	13 August 1883	17 February 2023	139 years	
Union	22 May 2023		3 years	
Mont Albert	11 August 1890	17 February 2023	132 years	
Box Hill	1 December 1882		143 years	
Laburnum	13 July 1958		68 years	
Blackburn	25 December 1882		143 years	
Nunawading	4 June 1888		138 years	Formerly Turnstall
Mitcham	25 December 1882		143 years	
Heatherdale	7 September 1958		68 years	
Ringwood	1 December 1882		143 years	
Heathmont	1 May 1926		100 years	
Bayswater	4 December 1889		136 years	
Boronia	16 June 1920		106 years	
Ferntree Gully	4 December 1889		136 years	Formerly Lower Ferntree Gully; Also spelt Lower Fern Tree Gully / Fern Tree Gully
Upper Ferntree Gully	4 December 1889		136 years	Also spelt Upper Fern Tree Gully
Upper Ferntree Gully	18 December 1900	30 April 1954	53 years	As narrow gauge interchange
Upwey	3 June 1901	30 April 1954	52 years	As narrow gauge
Upwey	19 February 1962		64 years	As broad gauge
Tecoma	1 February 1924	30 April 1954	30 years	As narrow gauge
Tecoma	19 February 1962		64 years	As broad gauge
Belgrave	18 December 1900	30 April 1954	53 years	As narrow gauge; Formerly Monbulk
Belgrave	19 February 1962		64 years	As broad gauge

== Infrastructure ==
=== Rolling stock ===
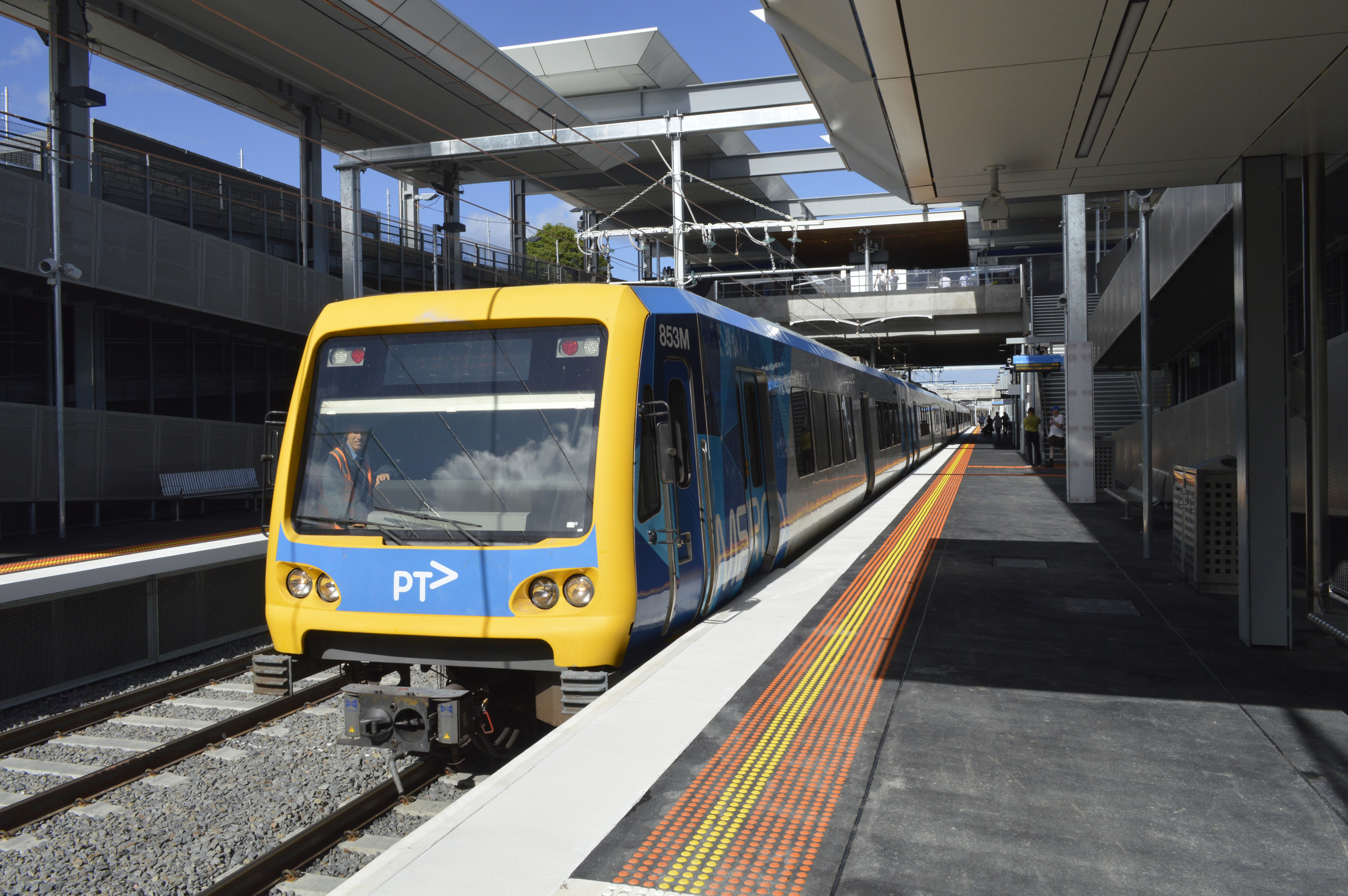
A Metro Trains Melbourne X'Trapolis 100 train arriving at Mitcham station

The Belgrave line uses X'Trapolis 100 electric multiple unit (EMU) trains operating in a two three-car configuration, with three doors per side on each carriage, and can accommodate up to 432 seated passengers in each six car configuration. The trains were originally built between 2002 and 2004 as well as between 2009 and 2020, with a total of 212 three-car sets constructed. The trains are shared with 7 other metropolitan train lines and have been in service since 2003.

Alongside the passenger trains, Belgrave line tracks and equipment are maintained by a fleet of engineering trains. The four types of engineering trains are: the shunting train, designed for moving trains along non-electrified corridors and for transporting other maintenance locomotives; for track evaluation; designed for evaluating track and its condition, the overhead inspection train; designed for overhead wiring inspection, and the infrastructure evaluation carriage, designed for general infrastructure evaluation. Most of these trains are repurposed locomotives previously used by V/Line, Metro Trains, and the Southern Shorthaul Railroad.

==== All passenger rolling stock ====
Picture	Name	Operational years on line	Reason for retirement	Notes
	Tait/Red Rattler	1923 - 1984	Unfit for City Loop and growing in age. Comeng was the final nail in the coffin	1923 - 1964 only to Upper Ferntree Gully
At Newport Railway Museum	Harris	1956 - 1988	Blue/White asbestos found in roofs, buried in Clayton mine	1956 - 1964 only to Upper Ferntree Gully
	Hitachi/Martin and King	1972 - 2013	Lacking modern electrical equipment and cheaper to retire them	For the VR, The Met, Connex and Metro
Unrefurbished Comeng, most common	Comeng	1981 - 2017 (approx. 10 beyond 2017)	For use on other lines, as they were permitted on all lines, unlike X'Trapolis	For Connex and Metro. Only 1 life-extended set ever ran to Belgrave.
At Box Hill, possibly from Belgrave	X'Trapolis 100	2002 - present	N/A	For Connex and Metro

=== Accessibility ===
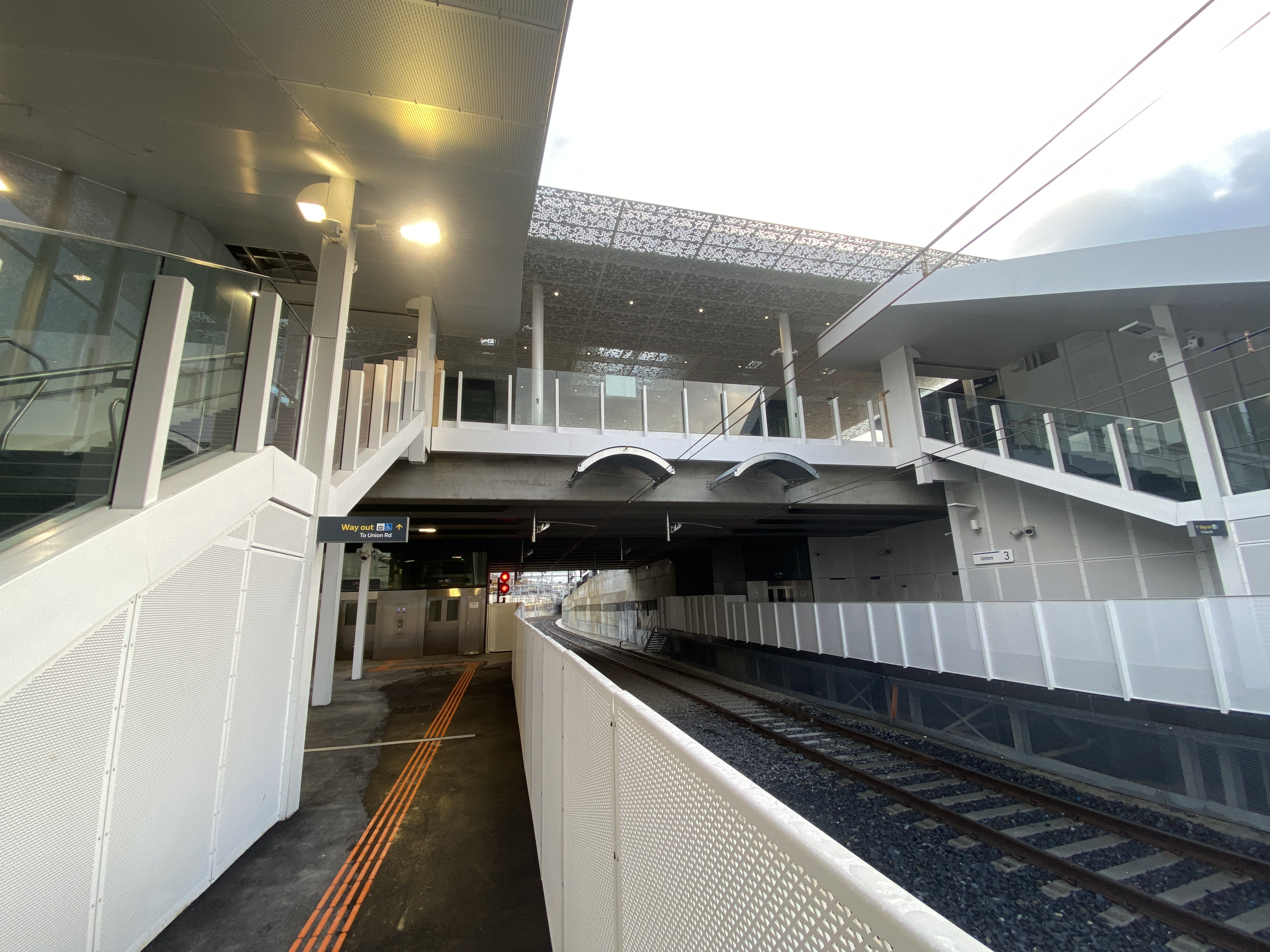
The rebuilt Union station features elevators alongside stairs

All stations that are new or rebuilt are fully accessible. Projects improving station accessibility have included the Level Crossing Removal Project, which involves station rebuilds and upgrades, and individual station upgrade projects. These works have made significant strides in improving network accessibility, with more than 58% of Belgrave line stations classified as fully accessible.

=== Signalling ===
The Belgrave line uses three-position signalling with automatic block signalling (ABS) and automatic and track control (ATC) safeworking systems. Three position signalling was first introduced on the line in 1919, with the final section of the line converted to the new type of signalling by 1960. Automatic and track control are used with the centre line between Burnley and Box Hill, and between Ferntree Gully and the line's terminus in Belgrave.

== See also ==
- Ringwood–Belgrave Rail Trail
