= Heathmont railway station =

Railway station in Melbourne, Australia

Heathmont
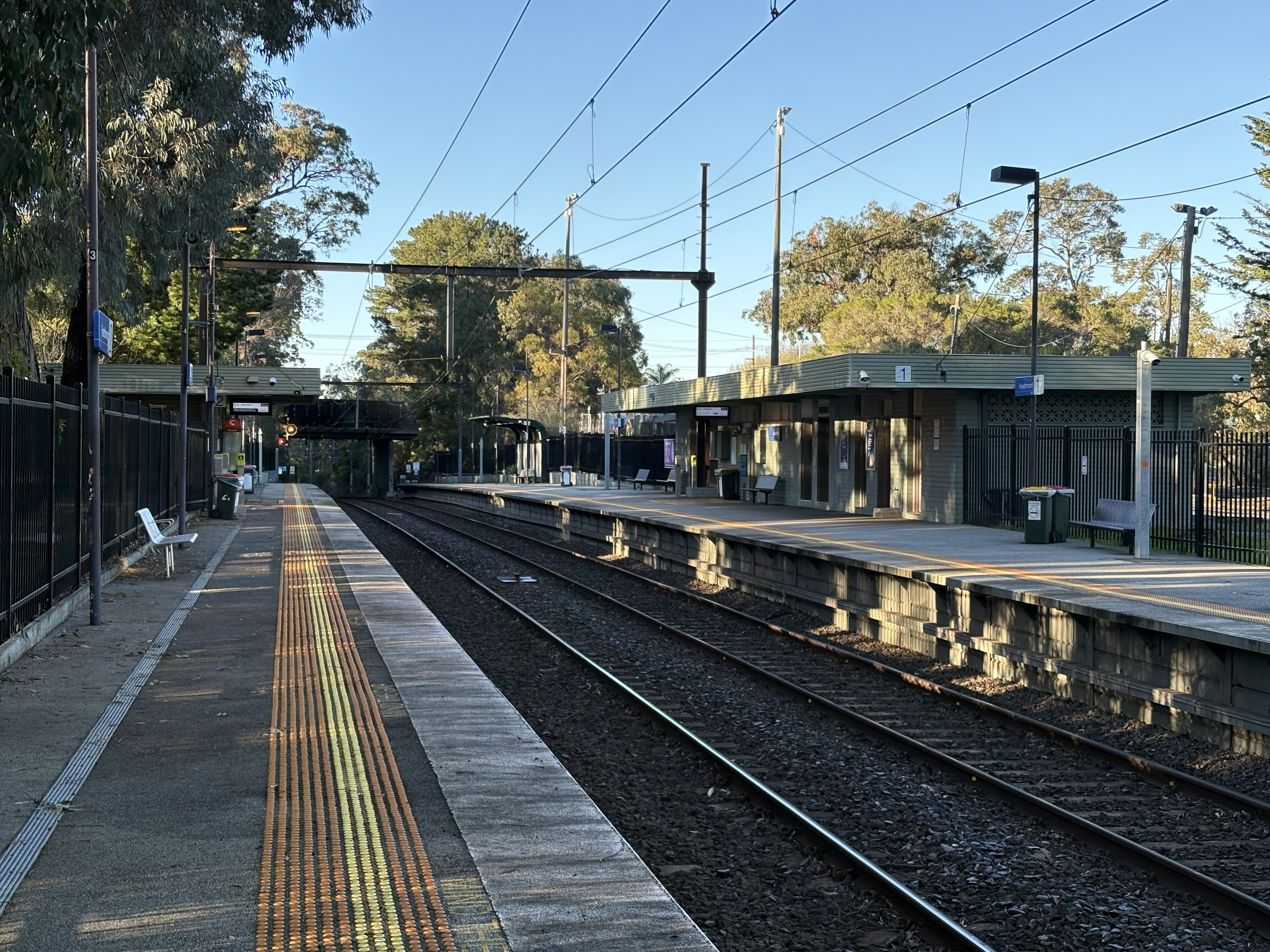
- Eastbound view from Platform 2, August 2026

General information
- Location: Heathmont Road, Heathmont, Victoria 3135; City of Maroondah; Australia
- Coordinates: 37°49′42″S 145°14′40″E
- System: PTV commuter rail station
- Owner: VicTrack
- Operator: Metro Trains
- Line: Belgrave
- Distance: 28.12 kilometres from Southern Cross
- Platforms: 2 side
- Tracks: 2
- Connections: Bus

Construction
- Structure type: Ground
- Parking: 135
- Cycle facilities: Yes
- Accessible: Yes — step free access

Other information
- Status: Operational, unstaffed
- Station code: HMT
- Fare zone: Myki zone 2
- Website: Public Transport Victoria

History
- Opened: 1 May 1926; 100 years ago
- Rebuilt: 1977; 19 December 1982
- Electrified: October 1925 (1500 V DC overhead)

Passengers
- 2005–2006: 567,343
- 2006–2007: 517,688 ▼8.75%
- 2007–2008: 507,340 ▼1.99%
- 2008–2009: 515,247 ▲1.55%
- 2009–2010: 505,703 ▼1.85%
- 2010–2011: 536,326 ▲6.05%
- 2011–2012: 483,563 ▼9.83%
- 2012–2013: Not measured
- 2013–2014: 558,417 ▲15.48%
- 2014–2015: 547,027 ▼2.03%
- 2015–2016: 568,734 ▲3.96%
- 2016–2017: 459,067 ▼19.28%
- 2017–2018: 555,335 ▲20.97%
- 2018–2019: 605,883 ▲9.1%
- 2019–2020: 471,200 ▼22.22%
- 2020–2021: 185,950 ▼60.53%
- 2021–2022: 105,300 ▼43.37%
- 2022–2023: 137,150 ▲30.24%
- 2023–2024: 150,050 ▲9.41%
- 2024–2025: 199,600 ▲33.02%

Services
Preceding station	Metro Trains	Following station
Ringwood towards Flinders Street	Belgrave line	Bayswater towards Belgrave
Ringwood Terminus	Belgrave line Shuttle service	Bayswater towards Belgrave
Track layout
Location

Heathmont station is a commuter railway station serving the eastern Melbourne suburb of the same name in Victoria, Australia. It was opened on 1 May 1926, with the current station layout dating from 1982. It is served by the Belgrave line, a part of the Melbourne railway network.

== Description ==
Heathmont railway station is located in Heathmont, a suburb in the outer east of Melbourne, Australia. The station is beside Canterbury Road, nearby to Heathmont Shopping Centre. Heathmont also lies along the asphalt-paved Ringwood to Belgrave Rail Trail, allowing shared use access by pedestrians and cyclists. Heathmont station is owned by state government agency VicTrack and operated by Metro Trains. It lies between the Ringwood (towards Flinders Street) and Bayswater (towards Belgrave) stations on the Belgrave line. It is in Zone 2 of Melbourne's transport network.

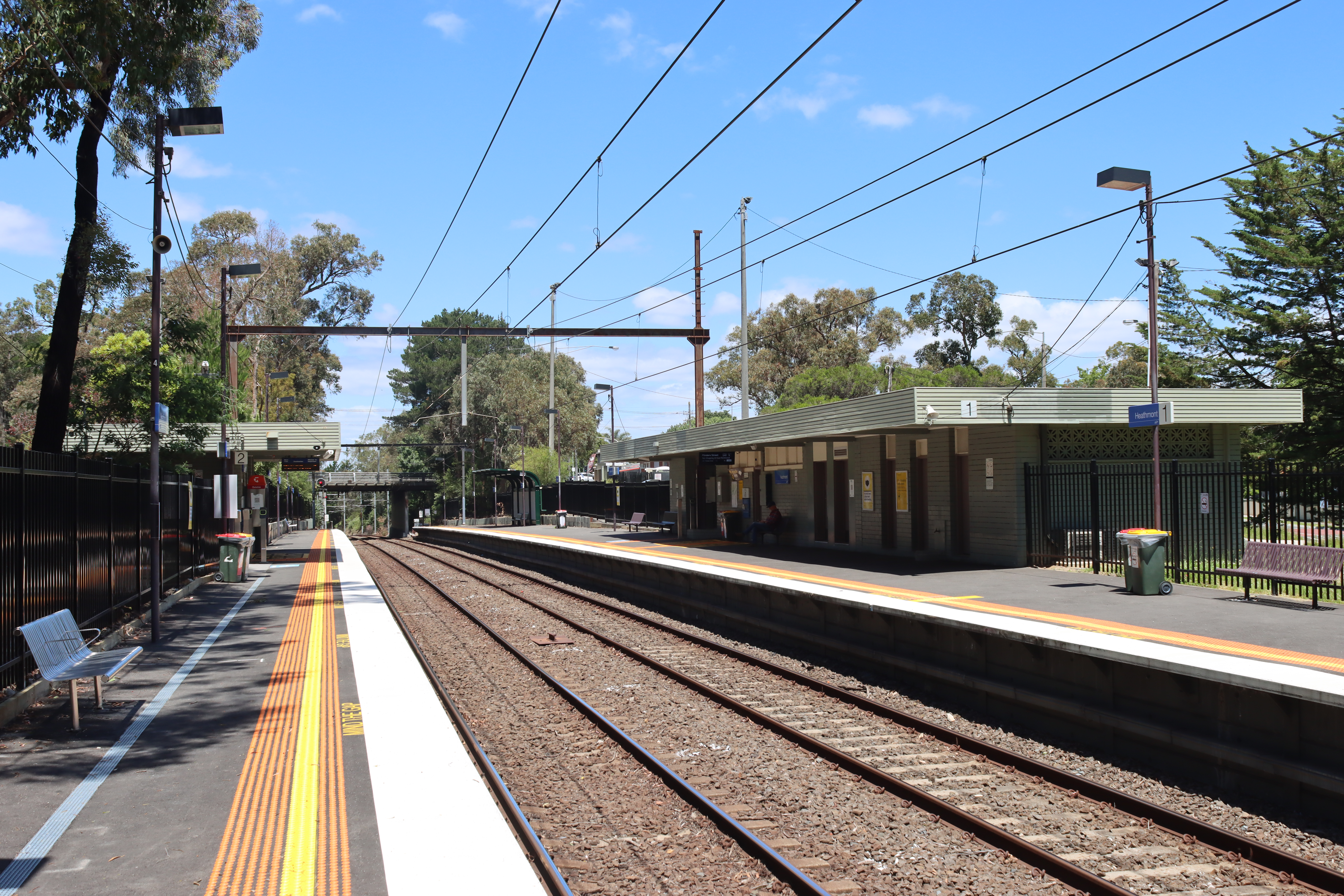
Southbound view from Heathmont platform 2; platform 1 station building visible

Heathmont features two side platforms. The station offers accessible parking, passenger information display screens, paths of minimum width 1200 mm, and accessible ramps but has no toilet facilities, dedicated pick-up/drop-off space, customer service staff, or accessible boarding arrangements.

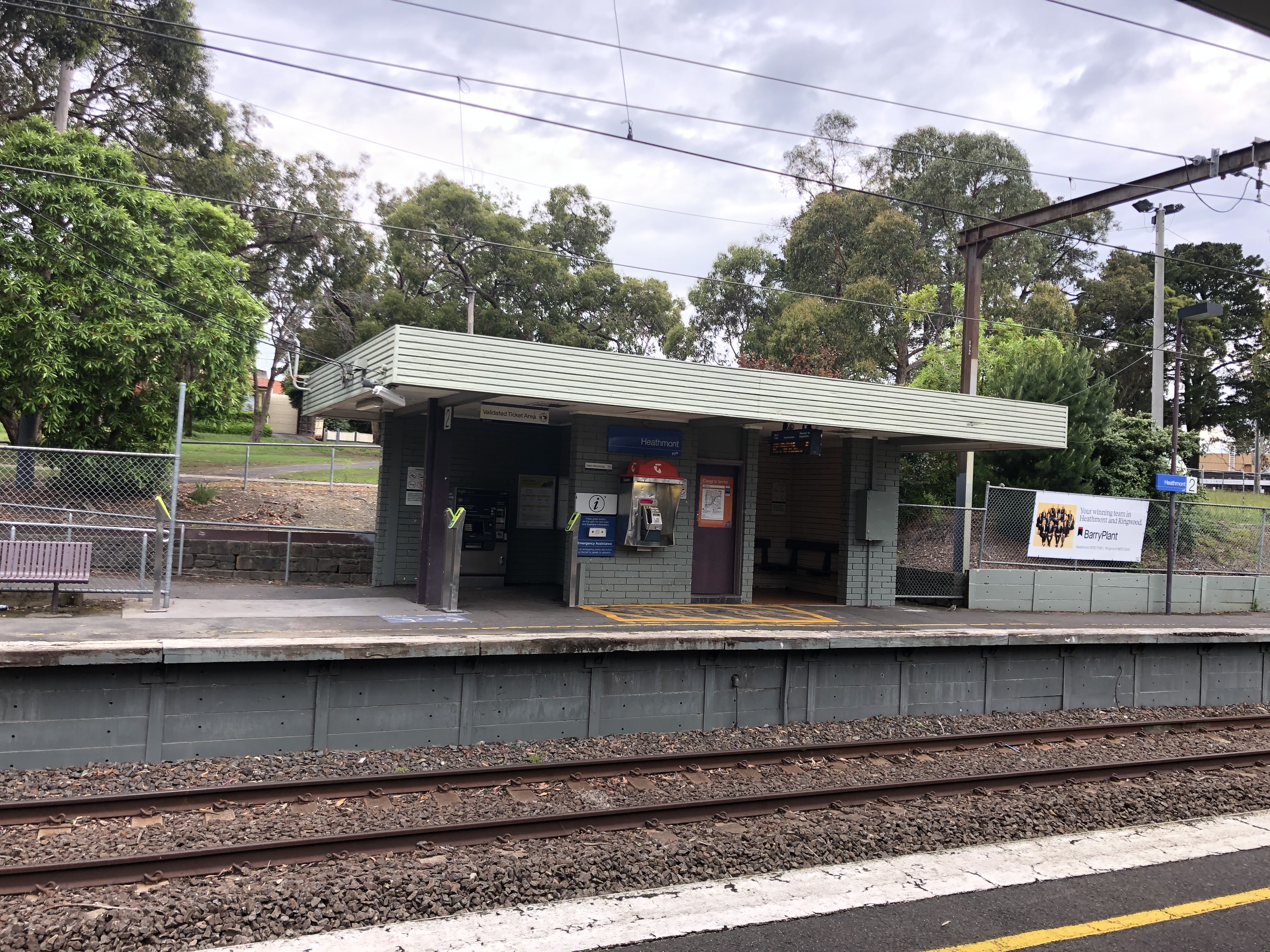
2019 photograph of Heathmont Station Platform 2 building

Both platforms include green-painted brick station buildings with limited sheltered and indoor waiting areas. The platform surfaces are asphalt with concrete at the edges. The platforms both include edge tactiles.

== History ==
The first section of the modern Belgrave line was built from Ringwood to Upper Ferntree Gully, passing through what would later become Heathmont without a station from 1889. Heathmont's first shop opened by 1923, and residents subsequently began campaigning for a station. The Belgrave line was electrified to Upper Ferntree Gully from 12 October, 1925. A station at the site began construction in early 1926 after residents raised ₤1000 for the project, before opening on 1 May that year. In 1929, this project was followed by the opening of a post office near the station.

After the Second World War, Heathmont began to urbanise rapidly with the influx of new migrants from Europe. Between 1953 and 1958, the population of Heathmont went from roughly 600 to around 3000.

In 1977, a station building was built on what is now the city-bound platform (Platform 1). On 19 December 1982, a second platform (Platform 2) was opened to facilitate the duplication of the line between Ringwood and Bayswater.

In 2007, upgrades saw motorised pedestrian gates commissioned at the up end of the platform and signalling improved around the station. In the same year, Melbourne's transit Zone 3 was abolished, and Heathmont recategorised into Zone 2. The new zone's lower fares saved Heathmont's passengers almost $3 on a daily ticket when the change was implemented.

The Heathmont History Group organised celebrations for the station's 100th anniversary in May 2026. Alongside a reenactment of the 1926 station opening, a concert was held with performers including a choir from a local school and Heathmont's Sing Australia choir.

== Platforms and services ==
Heathmont has two side platforms and is served by Belgrave line trains.

Heathmont platform arrangement
Platform	Line	Destination	Via	Service Type	Notes	Source
1	Belgrave line	Flinders Street, Ringwood	City Loop	All stations and limited express services	See City Loop for operating patterns	
1	Belgrave line	Ringwood		All stations	Mornings and late nights	
2	Belgrave line	Upper Ferntree Gully, Belgrave		All stations		

== Transport links ==
Ventura Bus Lines operates one route via Heathmont station, under contract to Public Transport Victoria:

- 679 : Chirnside Park Shopping Centre – Ringwood station

== Gallery ==
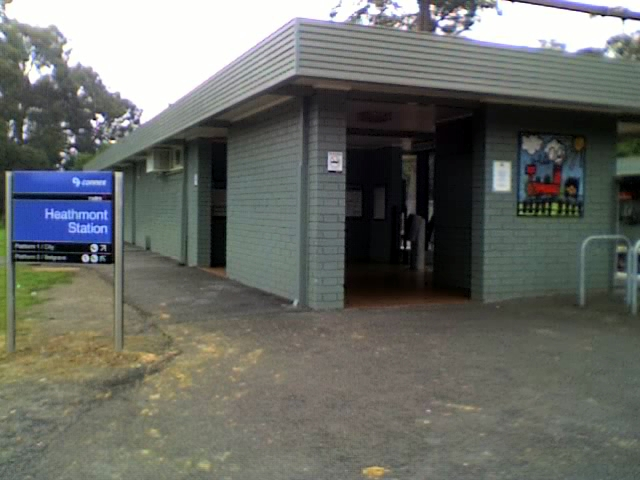
Station building and entrance, June 2006

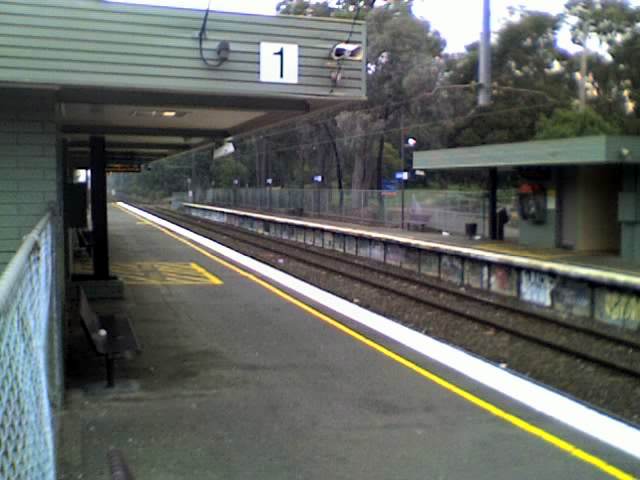
Northbound view from Platform 1, June 2006
