= Ferntree Gully railway station =

Railway station in Melbourne, Australia

Ferntree Gully
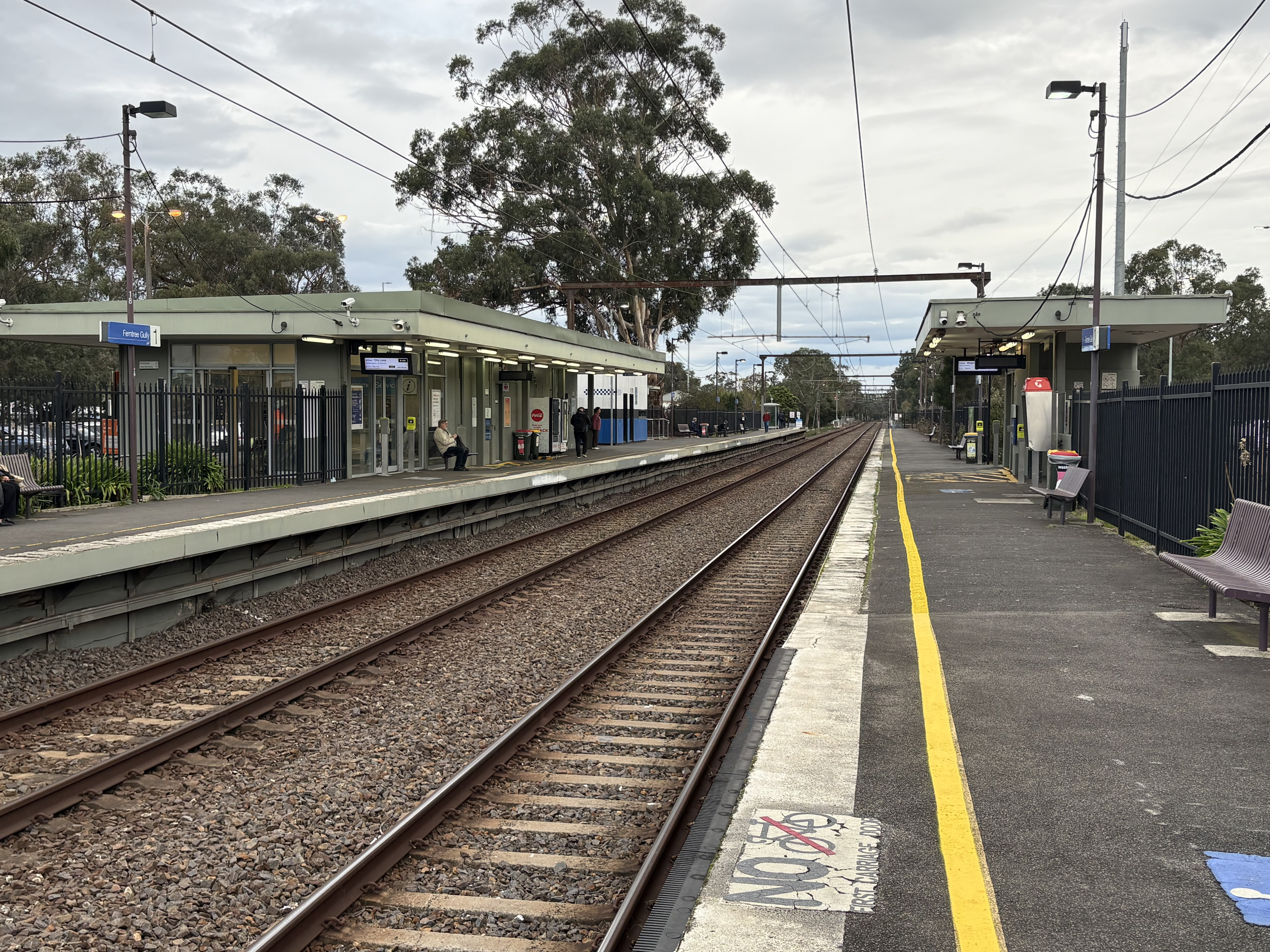
- Westbound view from Platform 2, June 2026

General information
- Location: Station Street, Ferntree Gully, Victoria 3156; City of Knox; Australia
- Coordinates: 37°52′54″S 145°17′43″E
- System: PTV commuter rail station
- Owner: VicTrack
- Operator: Metro Trains
- Line: Belgrave
- Distance: 35.89 kilometres from Southern Cross
- Platforms: 2 side
- Tracks: 2
- Connections: Bus

Construction
- Structure type: Ground
- Parking: 415
- Cycle facilities: 25
- Accessible: Yes — step free access

Other information
- Status: Operational, premium station
- Station code: FTG
- Fare zone: Myki zone 2
- Website: Public Transport Victoria

History
- Opened: 4 December 1889; 136 years ago
- Rebuilt: 1976
- Electrified: October 1925 (1500 V DC overhead)
- Former names: Lower Ferntree Gully (1889-1962); Ferntree Gully (1962-1972); Fern Tree Gully (1972-1977)

Passengers
- 2005–2006: 370,614
- 2006–2007: 413,707 ▲11.62%
- 2007–2008: 485,061 ▲17.24%
- 2008–2009: 467,512 ▼3.61%
- 2009–2010: 471,367 ▲0.82%
- 2010–2011: 518,688 ▲10.03%
- 2011–2012: 500,731 ▼3.46%
- 2012–2013: Not measured
- 2013–2014: 427,814 ▼14.56%
- 2014–2015: 420,094 ▼1.8%
- 2015–2016: 448,211 ▲6.69%
- 2016–2017: 353,933 ▼21.03%
- 2017–2018: 463,431 ▲30.93%
- 2018–2019: 491,141 ▲5.97%
- 2019–2020: 375,900 ▼23.46%
- 2020–2021: 162,600 ▼56.74%
- 2021–2022: 188,800 ▲16.11%
- 2022–2023: 246,500 ▲30.56%
- 2023–2024: 269,950 ▲9.51%
- 2024–2025: 337,700 ▲25.1%

Services
Preceding station	Metro Trains	Following station
Boronia towards Flinders Street	Belgrave line	Upper Ferntree Gully towards Belgrave
Boronia towards Ringwood	Belgrave line Shuttle service	Upper Ferntree Gully towards Belgrave
Track layout
Location

Ferntree Gully station is a railway station operated by Metro Trains Melbourne on the Belgrave line, part of the Melbourne rail network. It serves the eastern Melbourne suburb of Ferntree Gully in Victoria, Australia. Ferntree Gully is a ground level premium station, featuring two side platforms. It opened on 5 December 1889, with the current station provided in 1976.

Initially opened as Lower Ferntree Gully, the station was given the name Ferntree Gully on 1 October 1962, before it was renamed Fern Tree Gully on 29 February 1972 and finally reverted to its current name of Ferntree Gully in May 1977.

== History ==
Ferntree Gully station opened on 5 December 1889, when the railway line from Ringwood was extended to Upper Ferntree Gully. Like the suburb itself, the station was named after a fern tree gully that is located nearby in the Dandenong Ranges National Park.

In 1955, a goods siding at the station was abolished and, on 19 December 1959, the station was closed to all goods traffic. In 1963, flashing light signals were provided at the Alpine Street level crossing, located nearby in the down direction of the station.

In 1976, the current station buildings were provided, when the former signal panel was relocated into the new building. In 1977, the panel was abolished and, in that year, boom barriers were provided at the Alpine Street level crossing.

On 18 November 2008, it was announced that the station would be upgraded to a premium station. Work began in early 2009, and was completed by December of that year. On 31 July 2017, with a budget of $20 million, work began to add 215 new parking spaces at the station, which was completed by 1 December of that year.

South of the station, the double track railway becomes single track through to Belgrave.

== Platforms and services ==
Ferntree Gully has two side platforms. It is served by Belgrave line trains.

Ferntree Gully platform arrangement
Platform	Line	Destination	Via	Service Type	Notes	Source
1	Belgrave line	Ringwood, Flinders Street	City Loop	All stations and limited express services	See City Loop for operating patterns	
2	Belgrave line	Upper Ferntree Gully, Belgrave		All stations and limited express services		

== Transport links ==
Ventura Bus Lines operates five routes via Ferntree Gully station, under contract to Public Transport Victoria:

- 691 : Boronia station – Waverley Gardens Shopping Centre
- 693 : Belgrave station – Oakleigh station
- 755 : Bayswater station – Westfield Knox
- Night Bus 967 : Glen Waverley station – Croydon station (Saturday and Sunday mornings only)
- FlexiRide Rowville

== Gallery ==
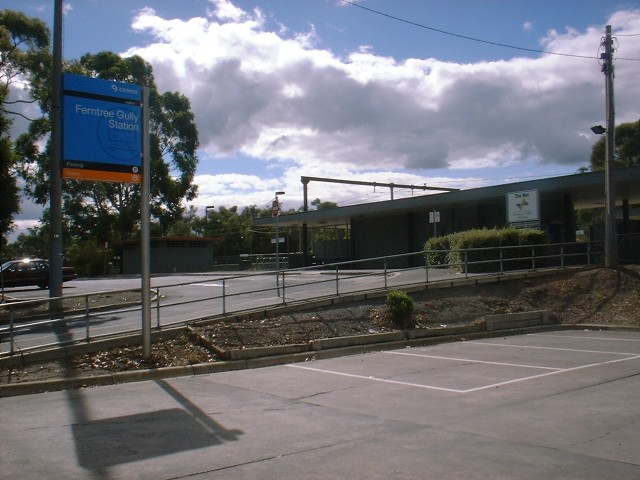
Station building and entrance to Platform 1,
April 2006

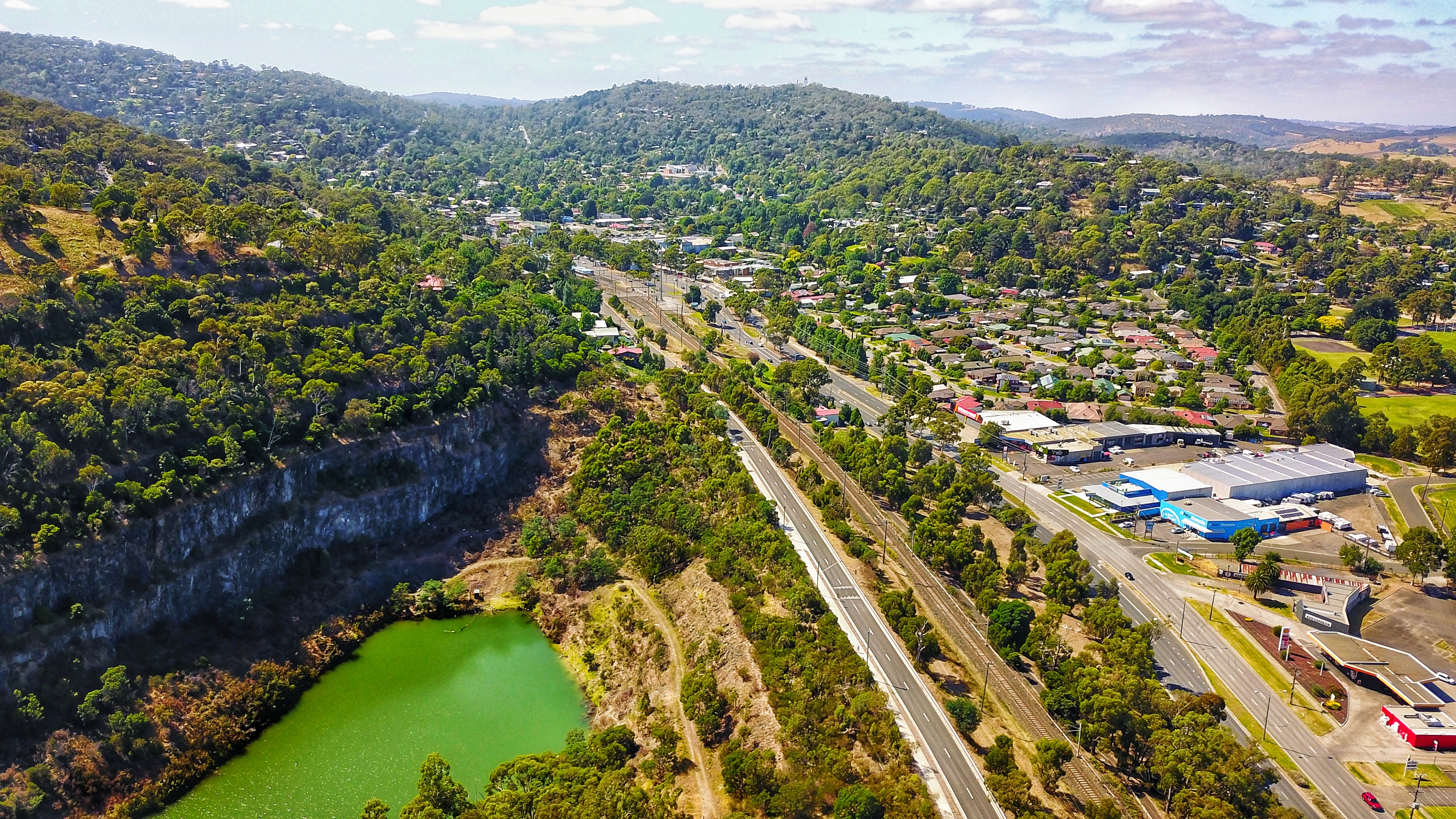
Aerial view of the Ferntree Gully Quarry Recreational Reserve, minutes away from the station, January 2019
