= Upper Ferntree Gully railway station =

Railway station in Melbourne, Australia

Upper Ferntree Gully
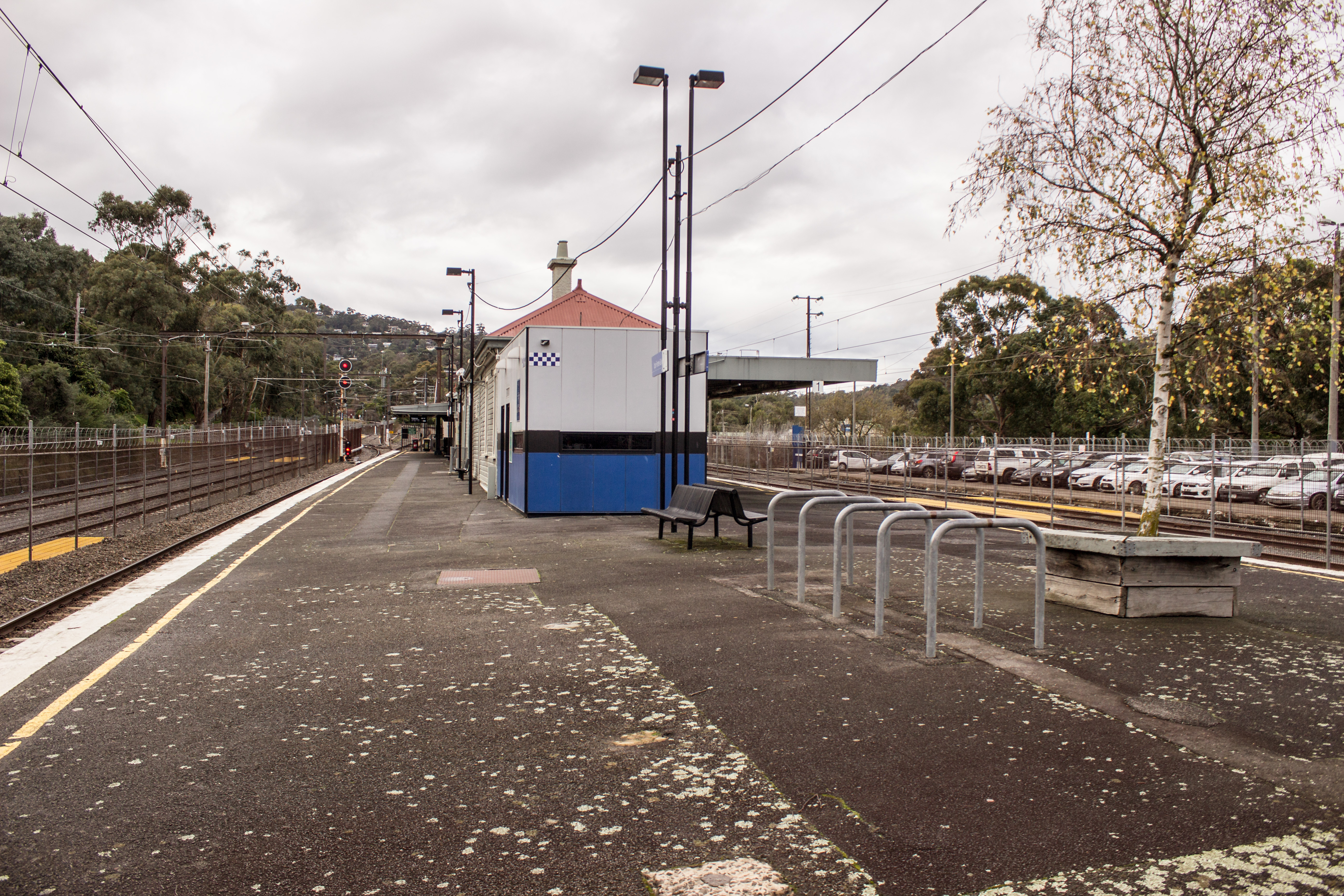
- Eastbound view from Platform 2, July 2021

General information
- Other names: Upper Fern Tree Gully
- Location: Burwood Highway, Upper Ferntree Gully, Victoria 3156; City of Knox; Australia
- Coordinates: 37°53′34″S 145°18′27″E
- System: PTV commuter rail station
- Owner: VicTrack
- Operator: Metro Trains
- Lines: Belgrave; Gembrook (former)
- Distance: 37.66 kilometres from Southern Cross
- Platforms: 2 (island)
- Tracks: 6
- Connections: Bus

Construction
- Structure type: Ground
- Parking: 170
- Cycle facilities: Yes
- Accessible: No—steep ramp

Other information
- Status: Operational, premium station
- Station code: UFG
- Fare zone: Myki zone 2
- Website: Public Transport Victoria

History
- Opened: 4 December 1889; 136 years ago
- Rebuilt: 21 November 1960; 19 February 1962
- Electrified: October 1925 (1500 V DC overhead)
- Former names: Upper Ferntree Gully (1889-1975)

Passengers
- 2005–2006: 258,755
- 2006–2007: 269,009 ▲3.96%
- 2007–2008: 310,278 ▲15.34%
- 2008–2009: 280,887 ▼9.47%
- 2009–2010: 272,580 ▼2.95%
- 2010–2011: 284,428 ▲4.34%
- 2011–2012: 277,734 ▼2.35%
- 2012–2013: Not measured
- 2013–2014: 246,301 ▼11.31%
- 2014–2015: 248,646 ▲0.95%
- 2015–2016: 274,809 ▲10.52%
- 2016–2017: 219,745 ▼20.03%
- 2017–2018: 265,508 ▲20.82%
- 2018–2019: 264,659 ▼0.31%
- 2019–2020: 210,850 ▼20.33%
- 2020–2021: 95,700 ▼54.61%
- 2021–2022: 103,250 ▲7.88%
- 2022–2023: 145,900 ▲41.3%
- 2023–2024: 155,150 ▲6.34%
- 2024–2025: 180,450 ▲16.31%

Services
Preceding station	Metro Trains	Following station
Ferntree Gully towards Flinders Street	Belgrave line	Upwey towards Belgrave
Ferntree Gully towards Ringwood	Belgrave line Shuttle service	Upwey towards Belgrave
Former services
Preceding station	VicRail	Following station
Ferntree Gully towards Flinders Street	Upper Ferntree Gully line	Terminus
Terminus	Gembrook line	Upwey towards Gembrook
List of closed railway stations in Melbourne
Track layout
Location

Upper Ferntree Gully station is a railway station operated by Metro Trains Melbourne on the Belgrave line, part of the Melbourne rail network. It serves the eastern Melbourne suburb of Upper Ferntree Gully in Victoria, Australia. Upper Ferntree Gully is a ground level premium station, featuring an island platform with two faces. It opened on 4 December 1889, with the current station provided between 1960 and 1962 respectively.

A number of services each day originate and terminate at Upper Ferntree Gully. The trains are stabled overnight in six of the seven sidings opposite the station.

== History ==
Upper Ferntree Gully station opened on 4 December 1889, when the railway line from Ringwood was extended. After December 1900, it became the break-of-gauge station between the broad gauge used in most of Victoria, and the narrow gauge Gembrook line (now the Puffing Billy Railway), one of the five narrow gauge lines of the Victorian Railways. In 1954, the narrow gauge line was closed. However, the line as far as Belgrave was rebuilt as a broad gauge electrified railway, which opened on 18 February 1962.

On 21 November 1960, the current island platform and the stabling sidings to the north of the station were provided. In 1964, a signal panel was installed at the station. It controls the single-track line between Ferntree Gully and Belgrave. The station also monitors, via closed-circuit television, all stations from Heathmont to Belgrave, and answers emergency calls from those stations.

On 4 August 1975, the name of the station was altered slightly to Upper Fern Tree Gully, although in more recent times most references have reverted to the original name. In 1978, a siding and a number of points and dwarf signals at the station were abolished.

In 1985, boom barriers were provided at the Hilltop Road level crossing, located nearby in the up direction of the station. On 2 July 1996, Upper Ferntree Gully was upgraded to a premium station.

== Platforms and services ==
Upper Ferntree Gully has one island platform with two faces. It is served by Belgrave line trains.

Upper Ferntree Gully platform arrangement
Platform	Line	Destination	Via	Service Type	Notes	Source
1	Belgrave line	Ringwood, Flinders Street	City Loop	All stations and limited express services	See City Loop for operating patterns.	
2	Belgrave line	Ringwood, Flinders Street	City Loop	Limited express services	Mornings only.	
2	Belgrave line	Belgrave		All stations and limited express services		

== Transport links ==
Ventura Bus Lines operates three routes via Upper Ferntree Gully station, under contract to Public Transport Victoria:

- 688 : to Croydon station
- 693 : Belgrave station – Oakleigh station
- 732 : to Box Hill station

== Gallery ==
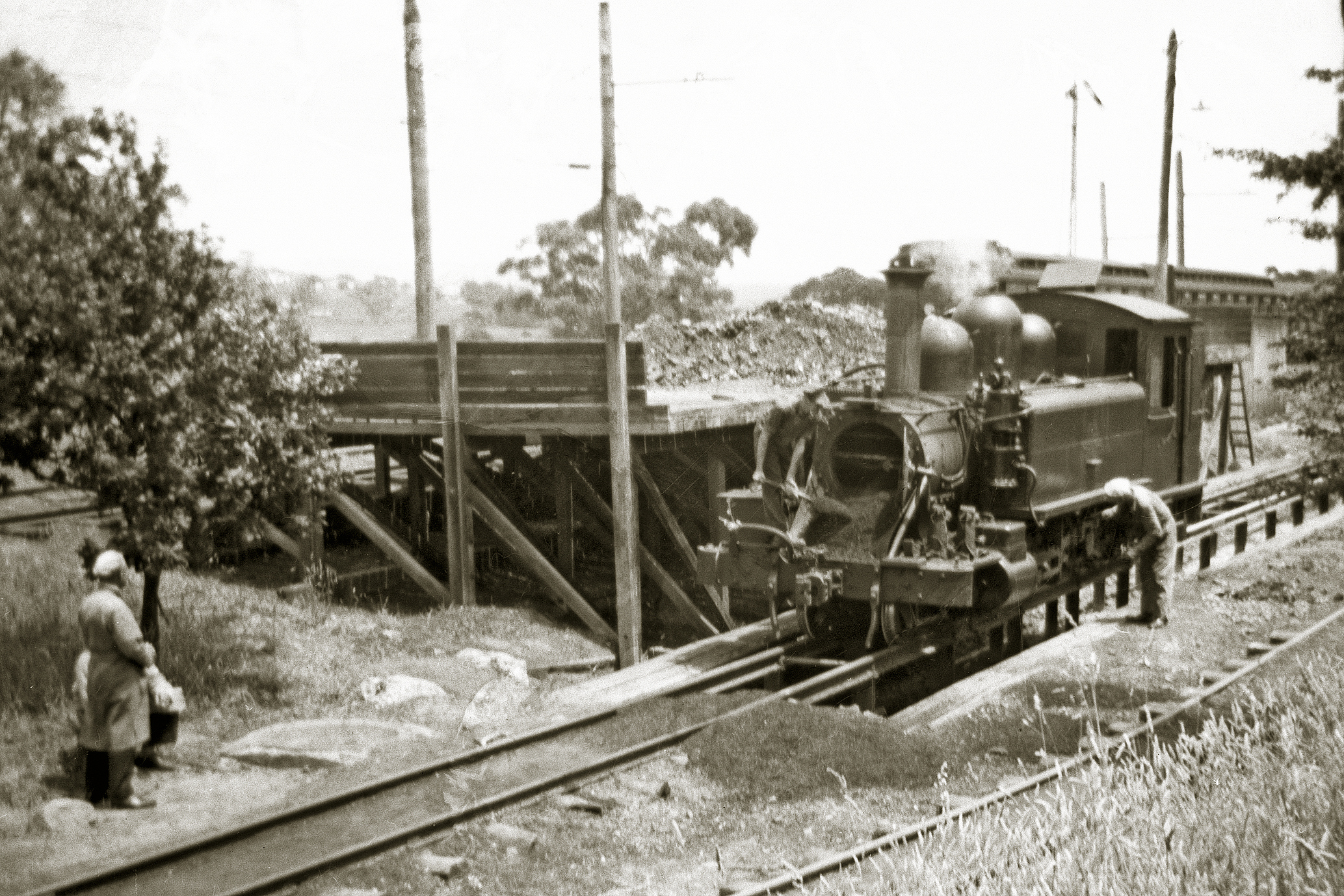
December 1954 - preparing for the "Young Sun" specials to Belgrave (Frank Stamford).

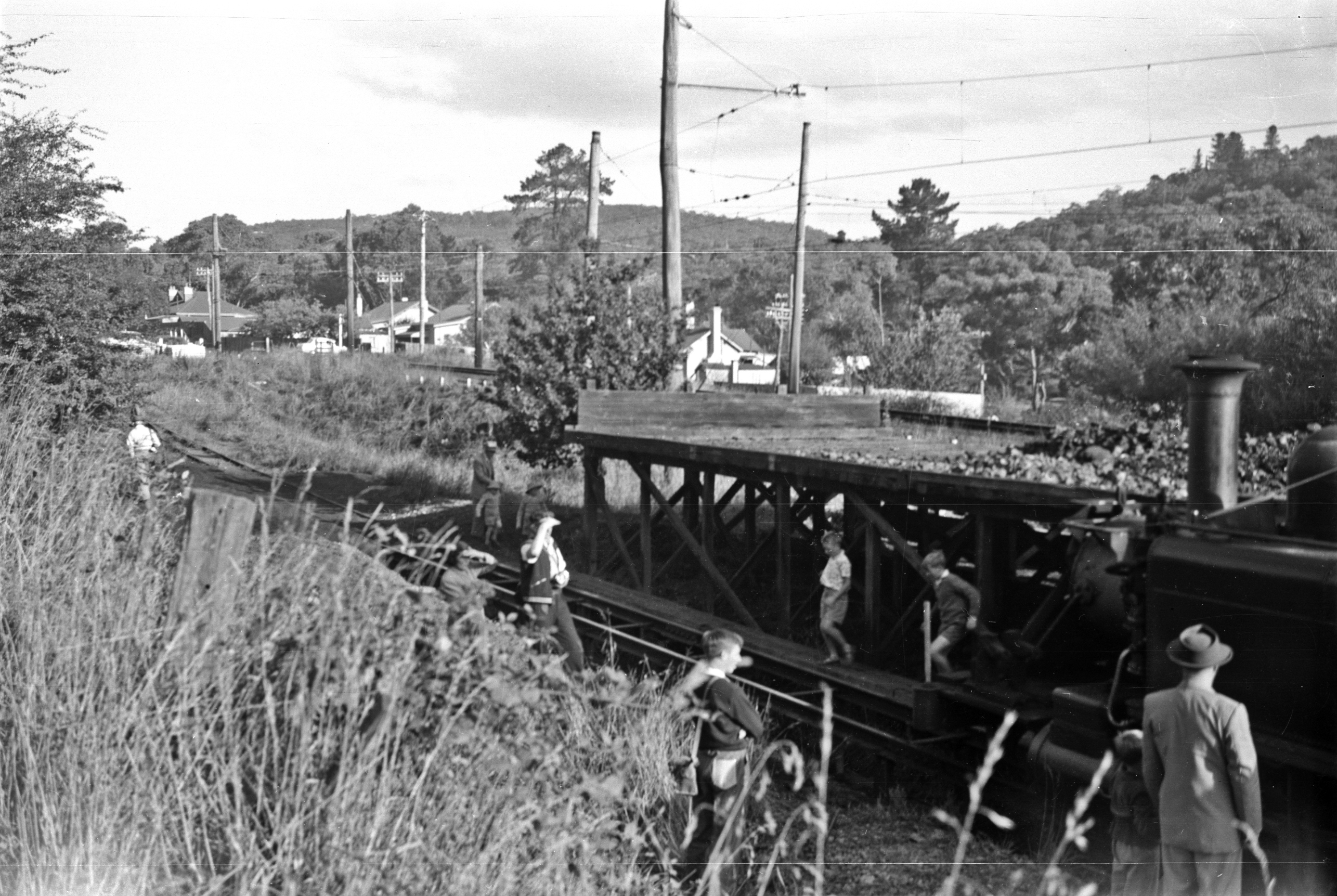
Puffing Billy, coal stage at Upper Ferntree Gully, c.1955 (Frank Stamford)

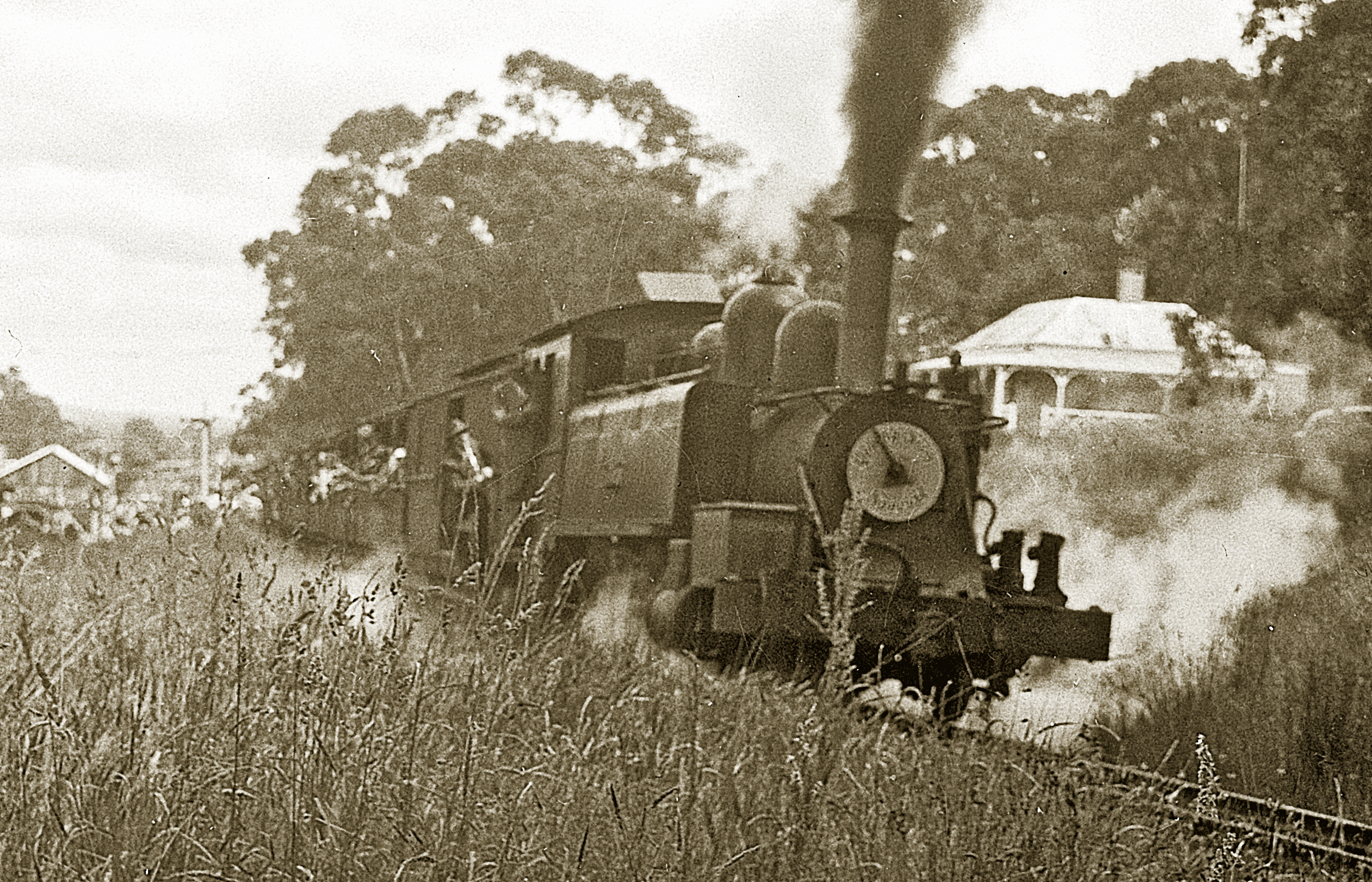
Puffing Billy departing Upper Ferntree Gully, December 1954. (Frank Stamford)

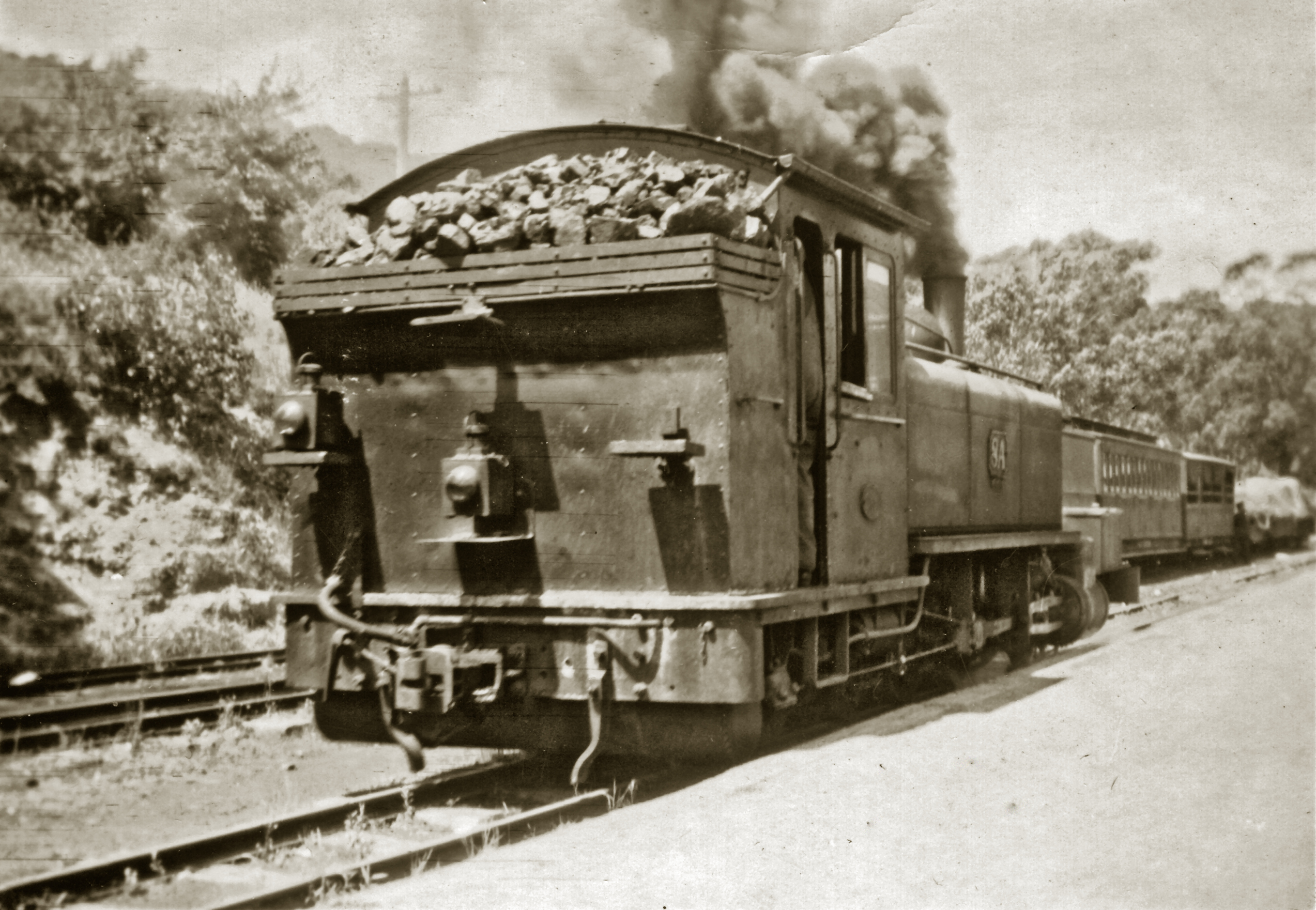
Puffing Billy railway. Locomotive 8A at Upper Ferntree Gully circa 1950. (Frank Stamford)

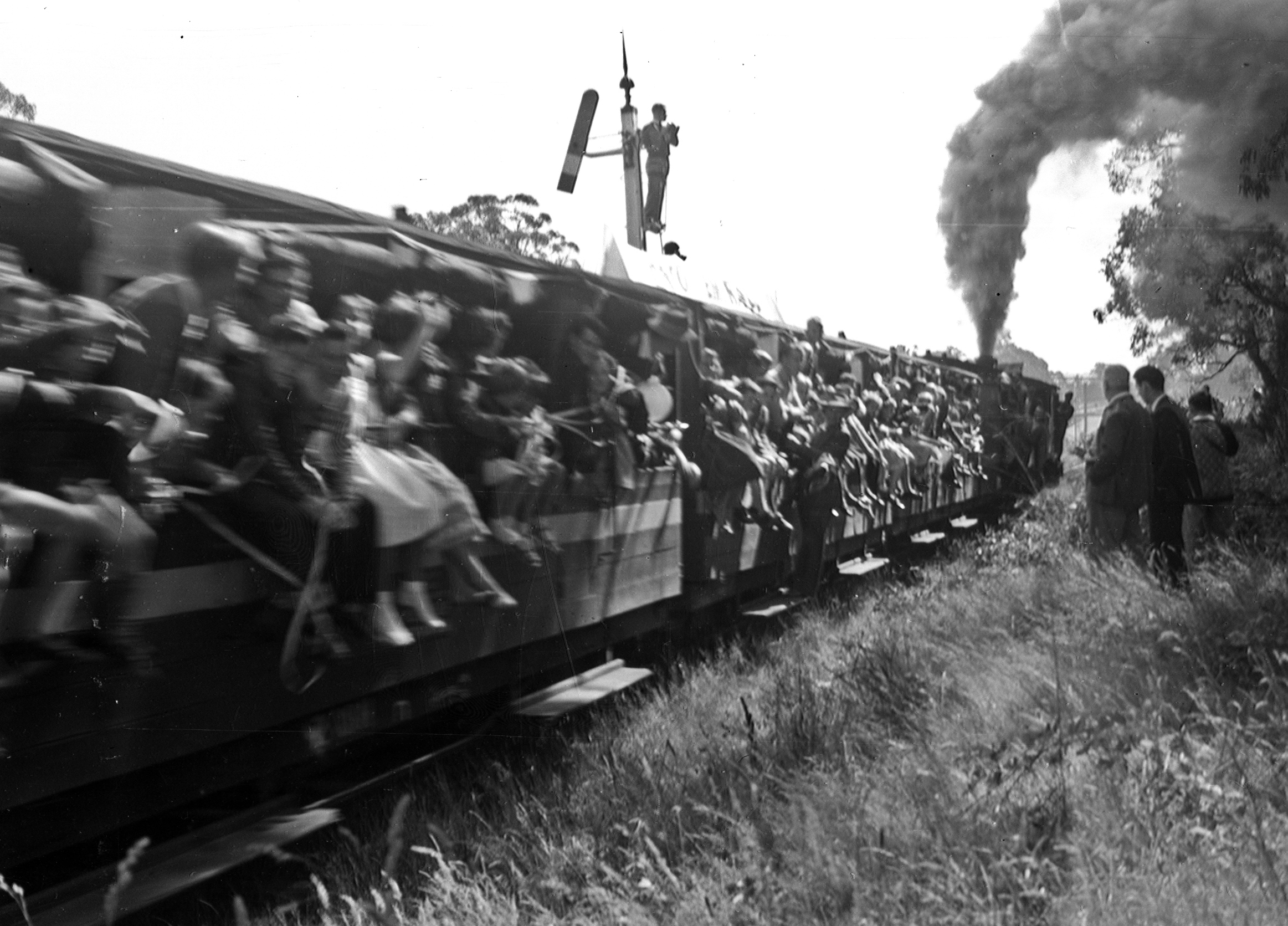
Puffing Billy at Upper Ferntree Gully, last day of narrow-gauge operation, February .1958. Train is being assisted up the steep grade with a locomotive pushing from the back.
