= Pic Nic railway station =

Former railway station in Victoria, Australia

Coordinates: 37°49′37″S 145°0′56″E

Pic Nic railway station, alternatively Pic-Nic, Pic-nic or Picnic, was a railway station in Melbourne, Australia. It was on the Hawthorn line (now the Belgrave and Lilydale line), on the Melbourne side of the Hawthorn Railway Bridge over the Yarra River, between Church Street (now East Richmond) and Hawthorn stations, and provided access to the adjacent Burnley Park.

The line to the station was opened by the Melbourne and Suburban Railway Company on 24 September 1860, and was extended to Hawthorn seven months later, following the completion of the Hawthorn Railway Bridge.

The station was included in the sale of the line to the Victorian Railways in 1878, and the duplication of the track to Hawthorn in 1882.

The station was the scene of a serious accident on 2 December 1882, when two trains collided head-on. One person was killed and 178 injured when a special train, returning from a land sale at Box Hill, collided with a scheduled train from Melbourne to Camberwell.

On 6 October 1895, Pic Nic was closed as a block point, and the station closed to all traffic on 18 July 1898. There is now an axle counter near the site, almost certainly a coincidence.

Today, there is still remnants of Pic Nic, with bluestone bricks used in the stations platform still visible today near the Glen Waverley lines crossover.

Preceding station	Disused railways	Following station
Burnley	Alamein, Belgrave and Lilydale line	Hawthorn
	List of closed railway stations in Melbourne	
