= RWE (disambiguation) =

RWE may refer to:

- RWE AG, German multinational energy company
- Ralph Waldo Emerson (1803-1882), American lecturer, philosopher, essayist, and poet
- FC Rot-Weiß Erfurt, German association football club
- Rot-Weiss Essen, German association football club
- Read write execute (RWE), basic permissions of a computer file
- Real world evidence (RWE), observational data obtained outside the context of randomized controlled trials (RCTs)
- Right-wing extremism, more commonly known as far-right politics
- Ringwood East railway station, Melbourne
- Radio Wolna Europa, Polish for Radio Free Europe
