= Chatham railway station, Melbourne =

Railway station in Melbourne, Australia

Chatham
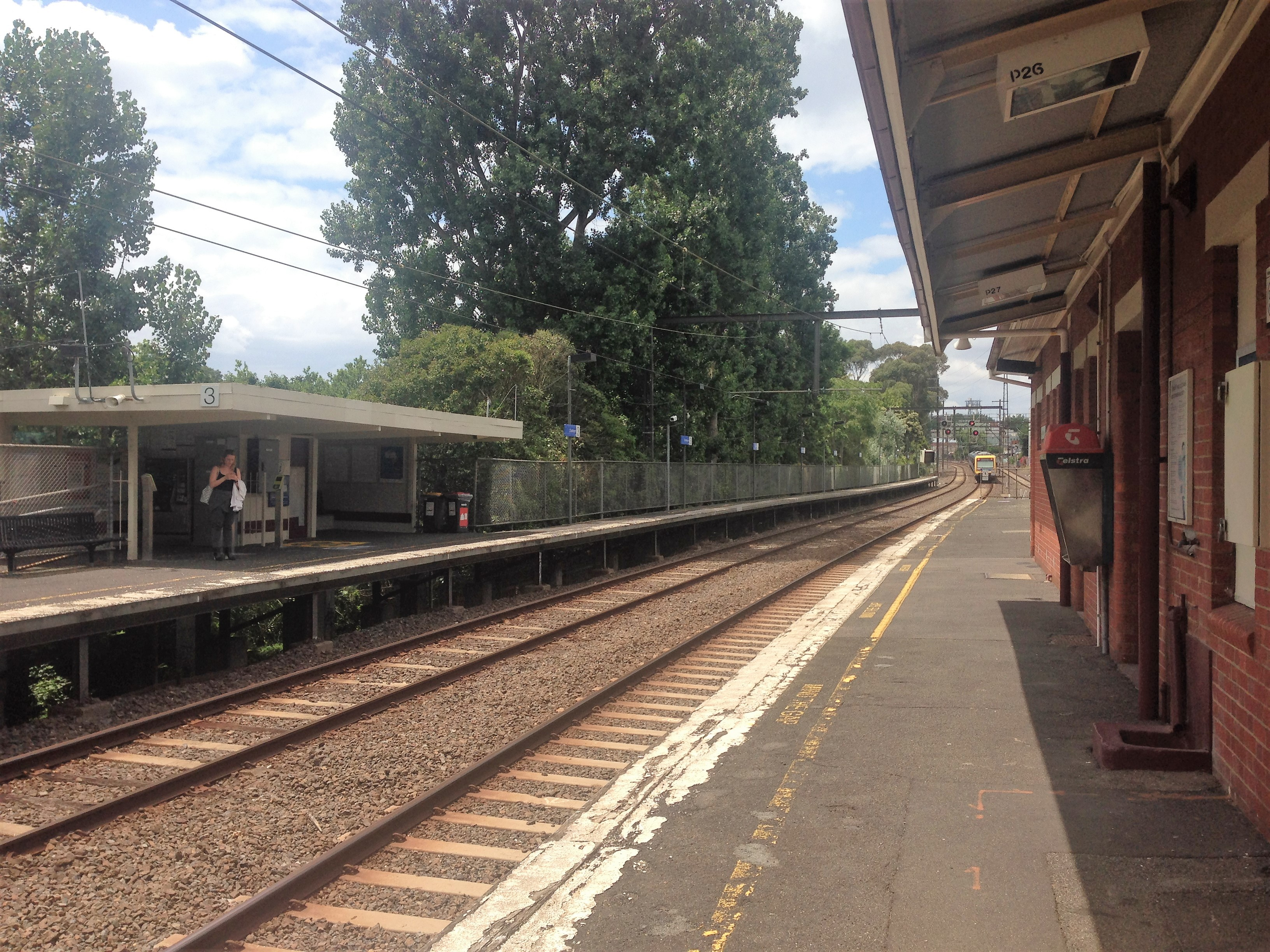
- Eastbound view from Platform 2, December 2018

General information
- Location: Stanley Terrace, Surrey Hills, Victoria 3127; City of Boroondara; Australia
- Coordinates: 37°49′27″S 145°05′19″E
- System: PTV commuter rail station
- Owner: VicTrack
- Operator: Metro Trains
- Lines: Lilydale; Belgrave
- Distance: 12.98 kilometres from Southern Cross
- Platforms: 3 (1 island, 1 side)
- Tracks: 3

Construction
- Structure type: Ground
- Parking: 10
- Cycle facilities: Yes
- Accessible: No—steep ramp

Other information
- Status: Operational, unstaffed
- Station code: CHM
- Fare zone: Myki zone 1/2
- Website: Public Transport Victoria

History
- Opened: 1 April 1927; 99 years ago
- Rebuilt: 19 December 1971
- Electrified: December 1922 (1500 V DC overhead)

Passengers
- 2005–2006: 176,321
- 2006–2007: 200,826 ▲13.89%
- 2007–2008: 233,167 ▲16.1%
- 2008–2009: 247,765 ▲6.26%
- 2009–2010: 239,410 ▼3.37%
- 2010–2011: 242,164 ▲1.15%
- 2011–2012: 220,773 ▼8.83%
- 2012–2013: Not measured
- 2013–2014: 236,690 ▲7.2%
- 2014–2015: 234,592 ▼0.88%
- 2015–2016: 250,161 ▲6.63%
- 2016–2017: 239,167 ▼4.39%
- 2017–2018: 239,338 ▲0.071%
- 2018–2019: 246,350 ▲2.92%
- 2019–2020: 196,950 ▼20.05%
- 2020–2021: 80,050 ▼59.35%
- 2021–2022: 95,650 ▲19.48%
- 2022–2023: 104,900 ▲9.67%
- 2023–2024: 175,600 ▲67.4%
- 2024–2025: 183,300 ▲4.38%

Services
Preceding station	Metro Trains	Following station
Canterbury towards Flinders Street	Lilydale line	Union towards Lilydale
Canterbury towards Flinders Street	Belgrave line	Union towards Belgrave
Former services
Preceding station	Disused railways	Following station
Line open	Lilydale line	Surrey Hills
Line open	Belgrave line	Surrey Hills
Track layout
Location

Chatham station is a railway station operated by Metro Trains Melbourne on the Belgrave and Lilydale lines, which are part of the Melbourne rail network. It serves the eastern suburb of Surrey Hills, in Melbourne, Victoria, Australia. Chatham station is a ground level unstaffed station, featuring three platforms, an island platform with two faces and one side platform. It opened on 1 April 1927, with the current station provided in 1971.

== History ==
Chatham station opened on 1 April 1927, and was named after nearby Chatham Road.

The station originally opened with the current island platform only. In December 1971, Platform 3 was provided when services on the third track from East Camberwell were extended through the station to Box Hill.

== Platforms and services ==
Chatham has one island platform with two faces and one side platform. Platforms 1 and 2 (island platform) has a large red brick building, while the non-aligned Platform 3 features a small weatherboard shelter. All three platforms are linked by an underpass.

It is serviced by Metro Trains' Lilydale and Belgrave line services.

Chatham platform arrangement
Platform	Line	Destination	Via	Service Type	Notes	Source
1	Belgrave line Lilydale line	Flinders Street	City Loop	All stations and limited express services	See City Loop for operating patterns	
2	Belgrave line Lilydale line	Lilydale, Belgrave		All stations	Weekends only.	
3	Belgrave line Lilydale line	Blackburn, Ringwood, Lilydale, Belgrave		All stations	Weekdays only.	
