= Surrey Hills railway station =

Former railway station in Melbourne, Australia

Surrey Hills
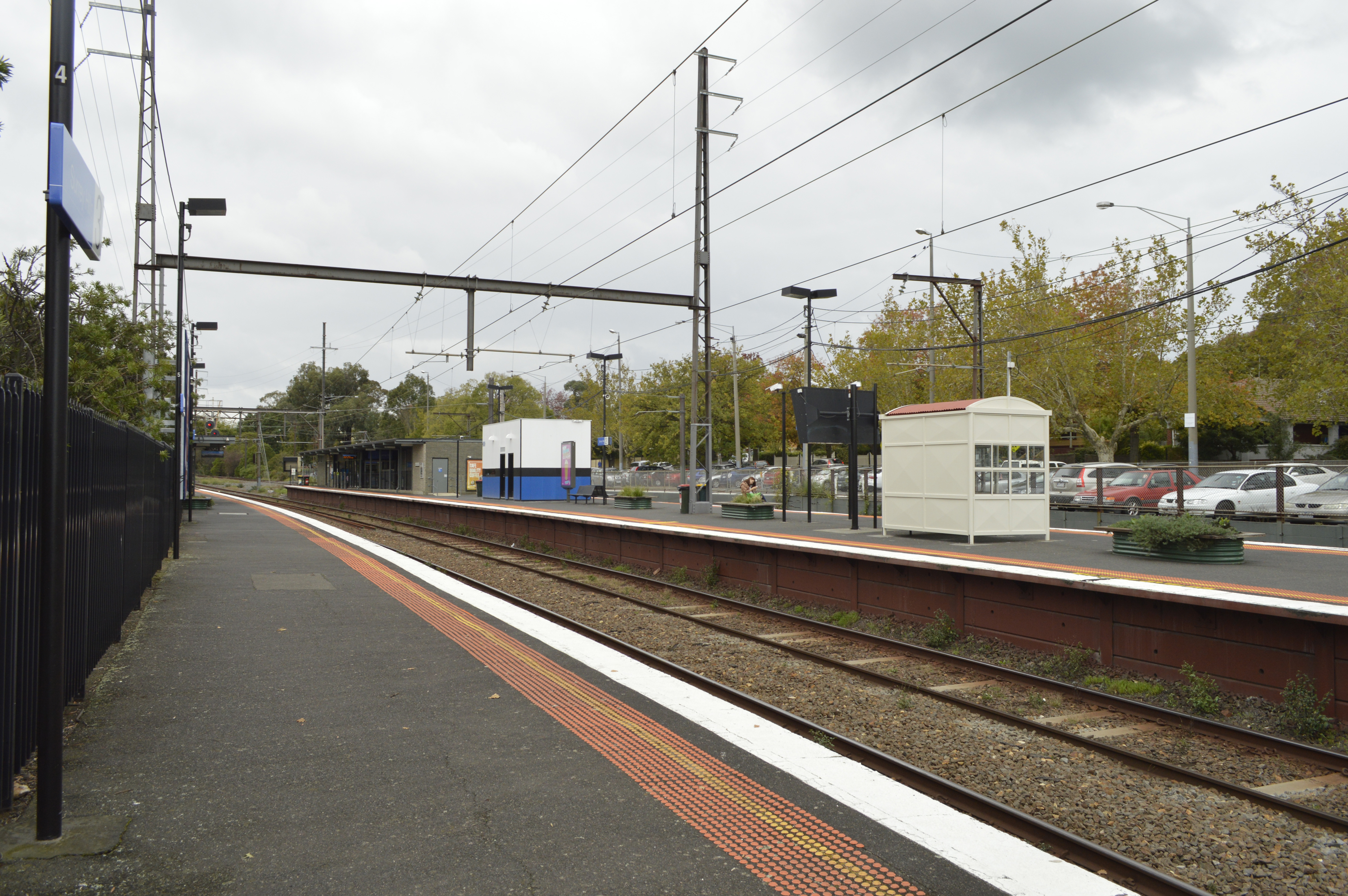
- Eastbound view from Platform 3 in May 2014

General information
- Location: Bedford Avenue, Surrey Hills, Victoria; Australia
- Coordinates: 37°49′26″S 145°05′56″E
- System: Closed PTV commuter rail station
- Owner: VicTrack
- Operator: Metro Trains
- Lines: Lilydale; Belgrave
- Distance: 13.84 kilometres from Southern Cross
- Platforms: 3 (1 island, 1 side)
- Tracks: 3
- Connections: Bus

Construction
- Structure type: Ground
- Parking: 350
- Cycle facilities: Yes
- Accessible: Yes

Other information
- Status: Demolished, premium station
- Station code: SHL
- Fare zone: Myki zone 1/2
- Website: Public Transport Victoria

History
- Opened: 13 August 1883
- Closed: 17 February 2023
- Rebuilt: 1966; 19 December 1971
- Electrified: December 1922 (1500 V DC overhead)

Passengers
- 2005–2006: 584,899
- 2006–2007: 624,194 ▲6.71%
- 2007–2008: 680,472 ▲9.01%
- 2008–2009: 725,658 ▲6.64%
- 2009–2010: 771,549 ▲6.32%
- 2010–2011: 764,161 ▼0.95%
- 2011–2012: 690,201 ▼9.67%
- 2012–2013: Not measured
- 2013–2014: 822,824 ▲19.21%
- 2014–2015: 779,991 ▼5.2%
- 2015–2016: 762,911 ▼2.18%
- 2016–2017: 753,815 ▼1.19%
- 2017–2018: 733,618 ▼2.67%
- 2018–2019: 725,221 ▼1.14%
- 2019–2020: 568,250 ▼21.64%
- 2020–2021: 245,900 ▼56.72%
- 2021–2022: 241,750 ▼1.68%
- 2022–2023: 175,650 ▼27.34%

Former services
Preceding station	Metro Trains	Following station
Chatham towards Flinders Street	Lilydale line	Mont Albert towards Lilydale or Belgrave
Chatham towards Flinders Street	Belgrave line	Mont Albert towards Lilydale or Belgrave
List of closed railway stations in Melbourne
Track layout
- Before station closure (February 2023)
Location

Surrey Hills railway station was a commuter railway station on the Lilydale and Belgrave lines, part of the Melbourne railway network. It served the eastern Melbourne suburb of Surrey Hills in Victoria, Australia. Surrey Hills was a ground level premium station, featuring three platforms, an island platform with two faces and one side platform. It was located between Chatham and Mont Albert and it opened on 13 August 1883 and closed on 17 February 2023, due to the works associated with the Level Crossing Removal Project.

== History ==
Initially, two trains ran to Lilydale each day and five only to Box Hill. At the time, engineers were unwilling to allow trains to stop at Surrey Hills, claiming potential difficulties with re-starting the gradient, and also that there was not enough traffic to warrant the stop.

In April 1883, a deputation asked for Surrey Hills to be a flag station, so that passengers wishing to alight could inform the guard of that at the previous station, while those wishing to join the train could show a red flag, or a red lamp at night. By August of that year, trains would stop on request. On 1 September of that year, Surrey Hills was brought into regular service. The station first appeared in the Victorian Railways working timetable on 15 October of that year.

On 9 December 1888, a second track opened, combined with a new platform on the north side of the line. By the 1930s, a small goods yard had been provided to the south of the station, in what later became a car-park. The connection to the mainline was at the Box Hill (down) end of the station.

In 1962, boom barriers replaced interlocked gates at the former Union Road level crossing, which was located at the up end of the station. In 1966, the goods yard, a signal box, a number of sidings and a crossover were removed to allow work on a third track to be carried out. At that time, the current station buildings were provided, and the former city-bound platform was converted to an island platform. In December 1971, services on the third track from East Camberwell were extended though the station to Box Hill.

In June 2001, Surrey Hills was upgraded to a premium station.

On 14 September 2016, two people were killed when a motor vehicle and an express X'Trapolis train set collided at the Union Road level crossing. Severe damage resulted to the train, and the vehicle was dragged 150 metres (490 ft) before coming to a mangled rest between the station platform and train. The station underpass was also damaged.

In 2020, it was announced by the Level Crossing Removal Project that as part of removing level crossings at Union and Mont Albert roads, the Surrey Hills and nearby Mont Albert stations were to be closed by 2023 and replaced with a single new railway station at Union, between the two former stations. Plans for the grade separation of the Union Road level crossing with a road overpass had dated as far back as the late 1970s before this project was ultimately executed. On 17 February 2023, the station was permanently closed for demolition, alongside Mont Albert. The replacement new station, Union, opened on 22 May of that year.

== Platforms and services ==
Surrey Hills had one island platform (Platforms 1 and 2) and a side platform (Platform 3), linked by an underpass. The island platform featured a large brick building with a customer service window, an enclosed waiting room and toilets. There was a small brick building on Platform 3.

It was serviced by Metro Trains' Lilydale and Belgrave line services.

Surrey Hills platform arrangement
Platform	Line	Destination	Via	Service Type
1	Belgrave line Lilydale line	Flinders Street	City Loop	All stations and limited express services
2	Belgrave line Lilydale line	Lilydale, Belgrave		All stations and limited express services
3	Belgrave line Lilydale line	Blackburn, Ringwood, Lilydale, Belgrave		All stations

== Transport links ==
At the time of closure, two bus routes serviced Surrey Hills, both under contract to Public Transport Victoria:

- 612 : Box Hill station – Chadstone Shopping Centre (operated by CDC Melbourne)
- 766 : Box Hill station - Burwood (operated by Ventura Bus Lines)

== Gallery ==
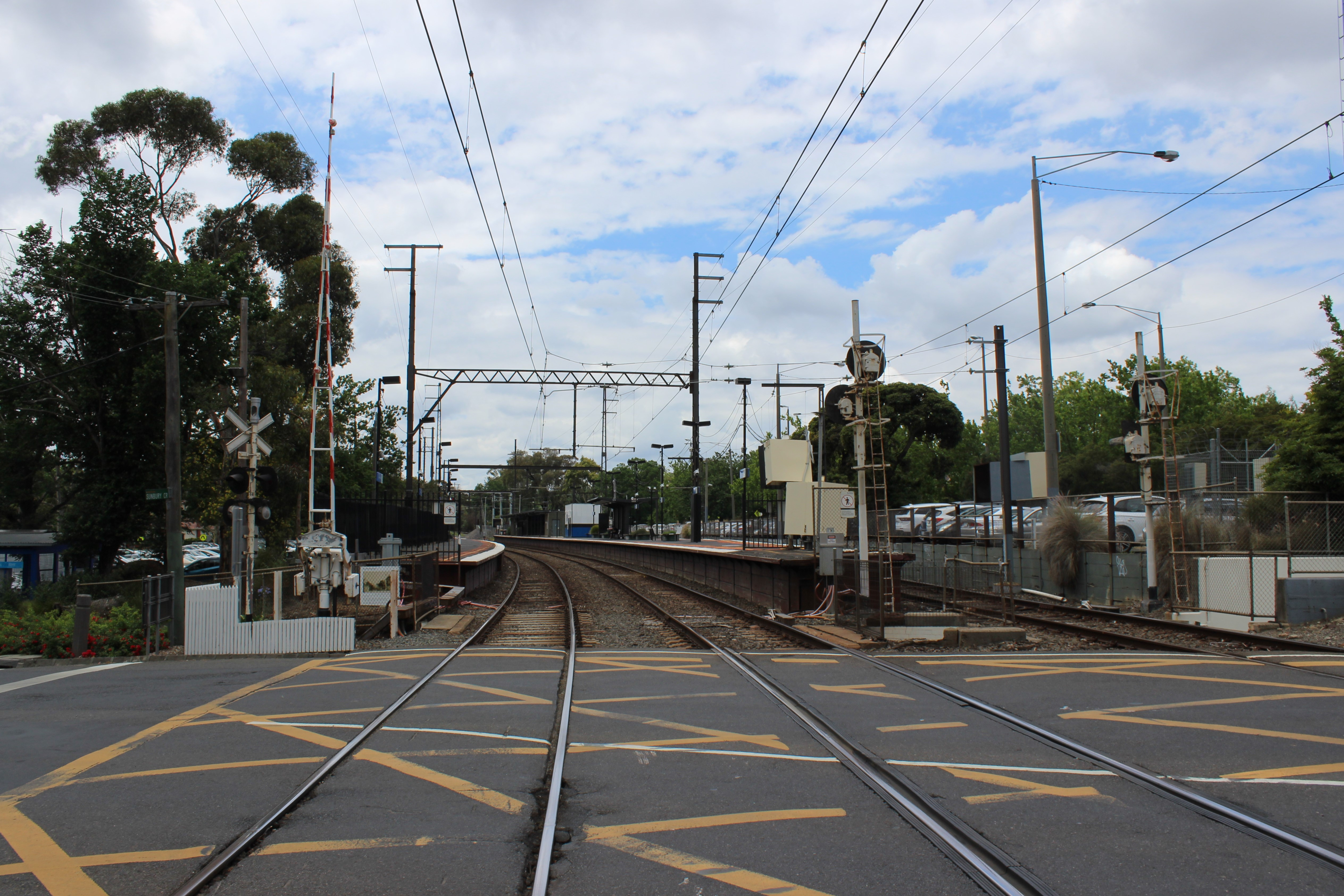
Looking east towards the Station from the Union Road level crossing, now demolished.

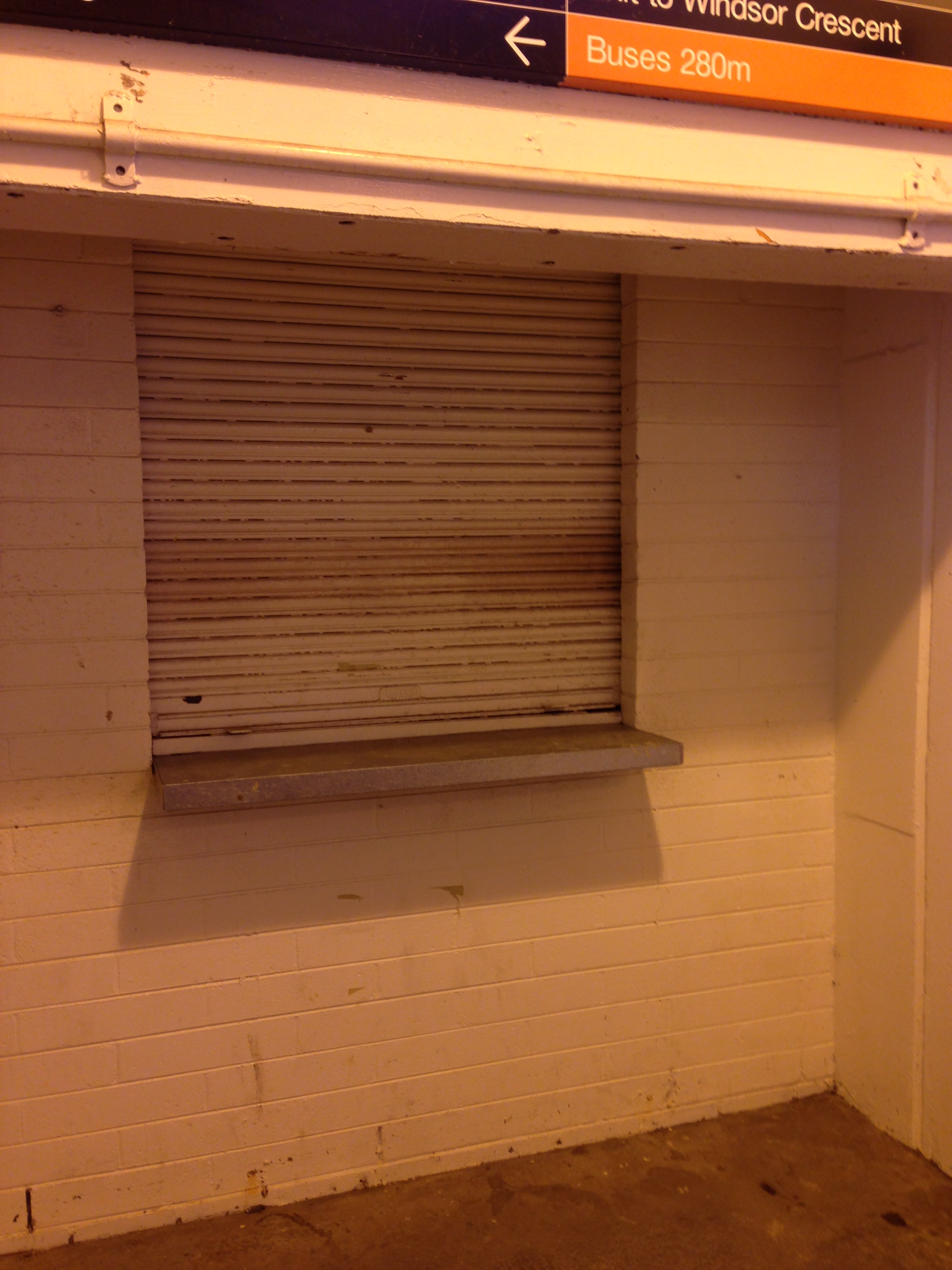
Former ticket office window in the former pedestrian underpass.

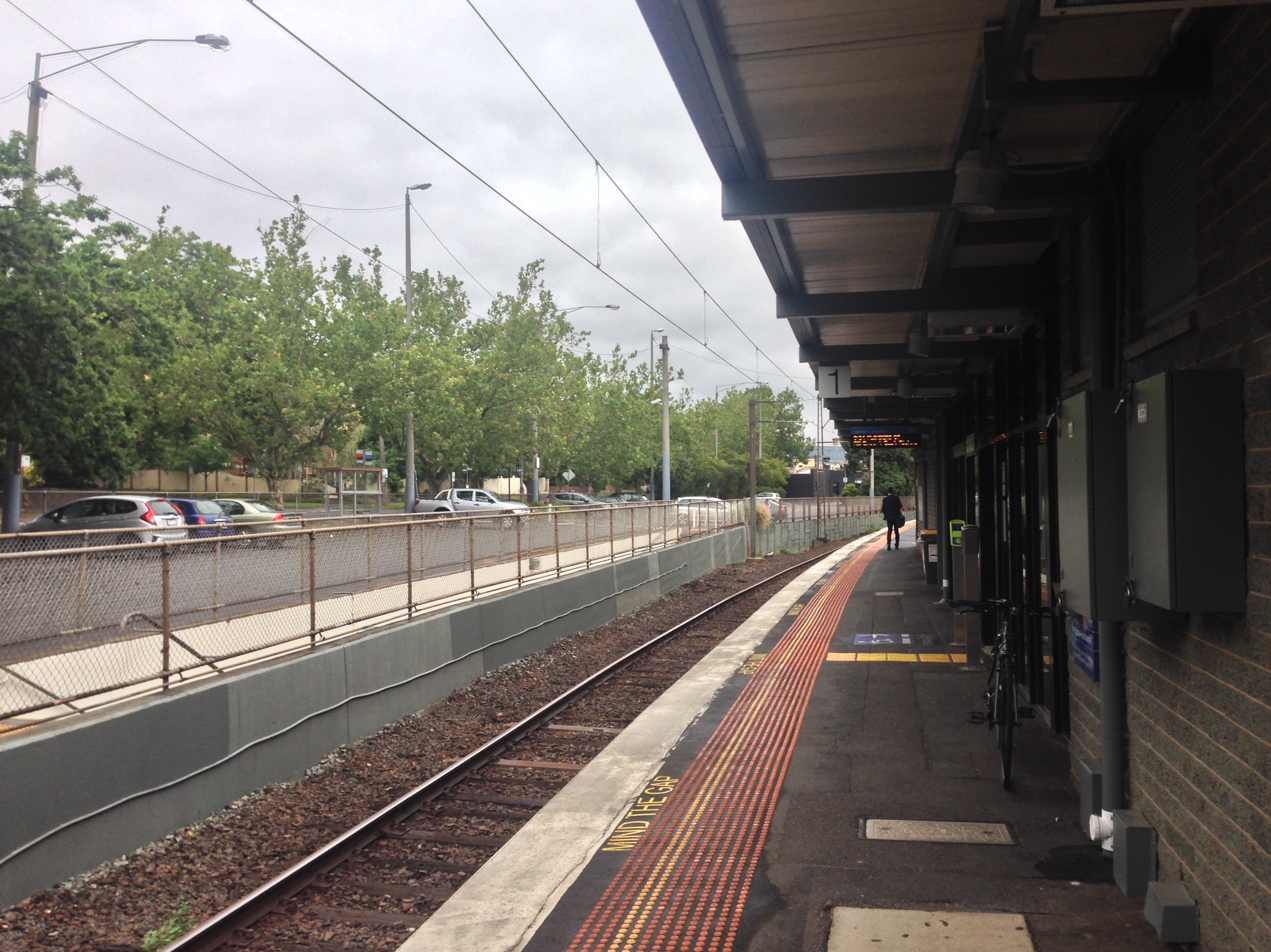
View looking west along Platform 1 on the south side of the station.
