= Union railway station, Melbourne =

Railway station in Melbourne, Australia

Union
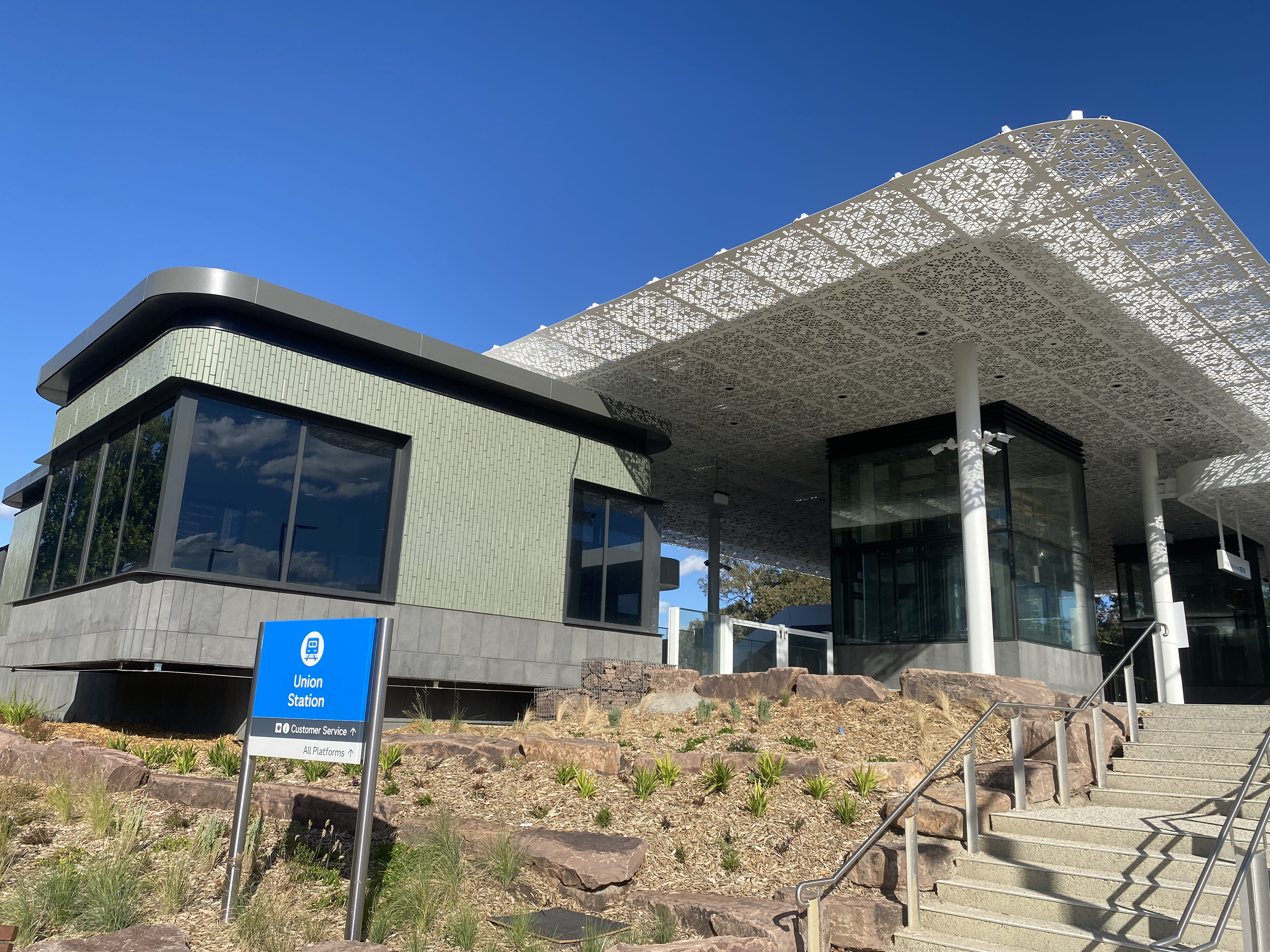
- Station building and entrance, December 2023

General information
- Location: Beresford Street; Mont Albert, Victoria 3127; City of Whitehorse; Australia
- Coordinates: 37°49′23″S 145°06′02″E
- System: PTV commuter rail station
- Owner: VicTrack
- Operator: Metro Trains
- Lines: Lilydale; Belgrave
- Distance: 14.14 kilometres from Southern Cross
- Platforms: 3 (1 island, 1 side)
- Tracks: 3
- Connections: Bus

Construction
- Structure type: Below ground
- Parking: 290
- Cycle facilities: 26
- Accessible: Yes—step free access

Other information
- Status: Operational, premium station
- Station code: UNN
- Fare zone: Myki zone 1/2
- Website: Public Transport Victoria

History
- Opened: 22 May 2023; 3 years ago
- Electrified: 1500 V DC overhead

Passengers
- 2022–2023: 50,850
- 2023–2024: 512,800 ▲908.46%
- 2024–2025: 593,100 ▲15.66%

Services
Preceding station	Metro Trains	Following station
Chatham towards Flinders Street	Lilydale line	Box Hill towards Lilydale
Chatham towards Flinders Street	Belgrave line	Box Hill towards Belgrave
Track layout
Location

Union station is a railway station operated by Metro Trains Melbourne on the Belgrave and Lilydale lines, both part of the Melbourne rail network. It serves the eastern Melbourne suburb of Mont Albert in Victoria, Australia. Union is a below ground premium station, featuring three platforms, an island platform with two faces and one side platform. It opened on 22 May 2023 after the closure of Mont Albert and Surrey Hills stations. It was built as part of the Level Crossing Removal Project.

== History ==
In December 2020, it was announced that Mont Albert and Surrey Hills stations (approximately 750 m (2,460 ft) apart) would be closed, and replaced with a station in between them. This was due to the fact that level crossing removal works on Union Road and Mont Albert Road required a rebuild of the stations, which would have violated rail safety standards as they were located on curved tracks. Moving the stations to straighter track would necessitate moving them closer together, hence the decision to only build one station with the western entry in Surrey Hills and an eastern entry in Mont Albert.

The name of the new station was announced as Union on 23 March 2022, selected both to represent the unity of the two stations and for the nearby Union Road shopping village.

== Platforms and services ==
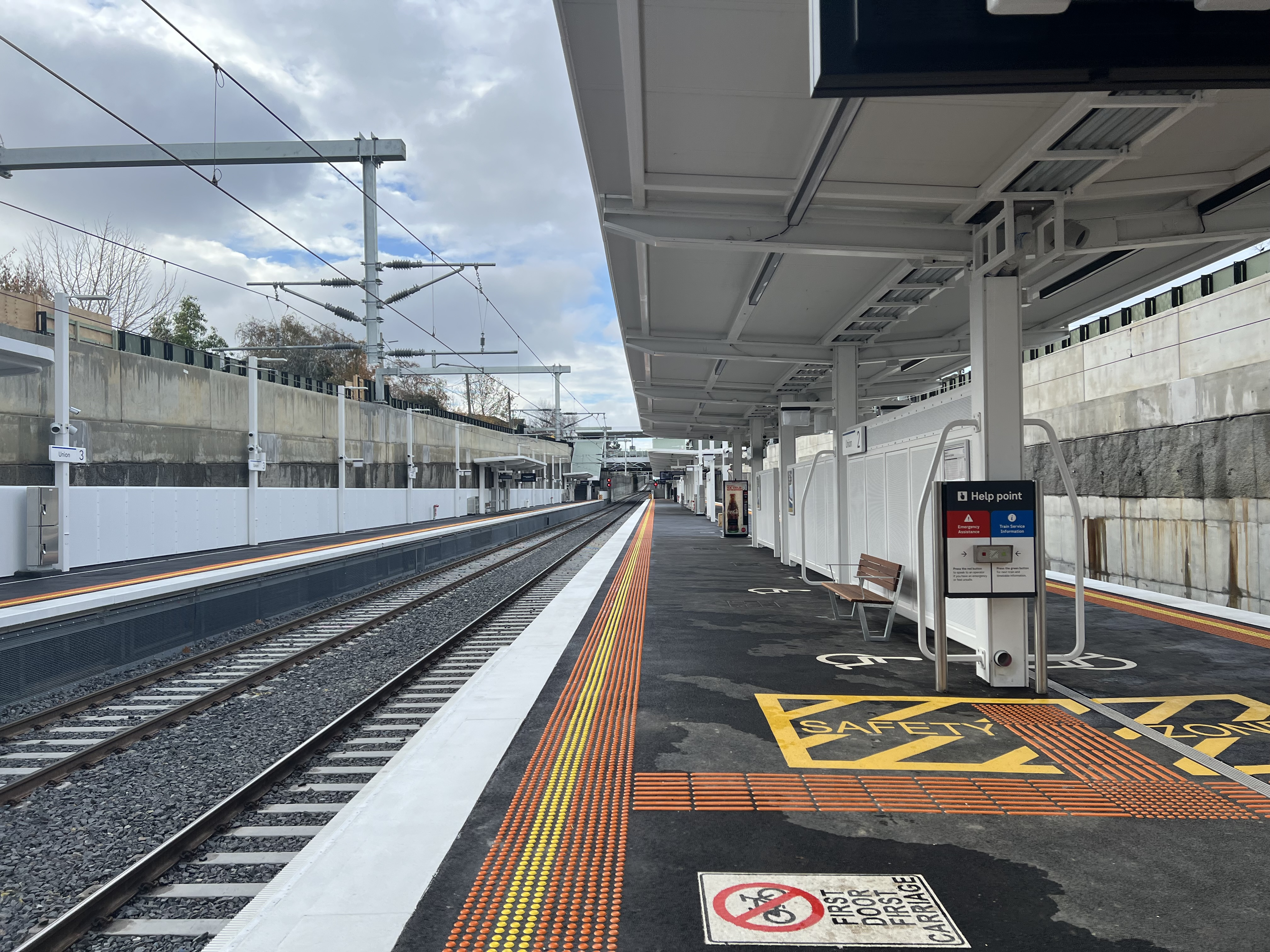
Eastbound view from Platform 2, June 2023

Union has one island platform with two faces and one side platform. It is served by Lilydale and Belgrave line trains.

Union platform arrangement
Platform	Line	Destination	Via	Service Type	Notes	Source
1	Belgrave line Lilydale line	Flinders Street	City Loop	All stations and limited express services	See City Loop for operating patterns. Weekday mornings only for Platform 2.	
2	Belgrave line Lilydale line	Flinders Street	City Loop	All stations and limited express services	See City Loop for operating patterns. Weekday mornings only for Platform 2.	
2	Belgrave line Lilydale line	Ringwood or Lilydale		All stations	Weekday evenings only.	
2	Belgrave line Lilydale line	Lilydale or Belgrave		All stations	Weekends only.	
3	Belgrave line Lilydale line	Blackburn, Ringwood, Lilydale or Belgrave		All stations	Weekdays only.	

== Transport links ==
CDC Melbourne operates one bus route via Union station, under contract to Public Transport Victoria:

- 612 : Box Hill station – Chadstone Shopping Centre

Ventura Bus Lines operates one bus route via Union station, under contract to Public Transport Victoria:

- 766 : Box Hill station – Burwood

== Gallery ==
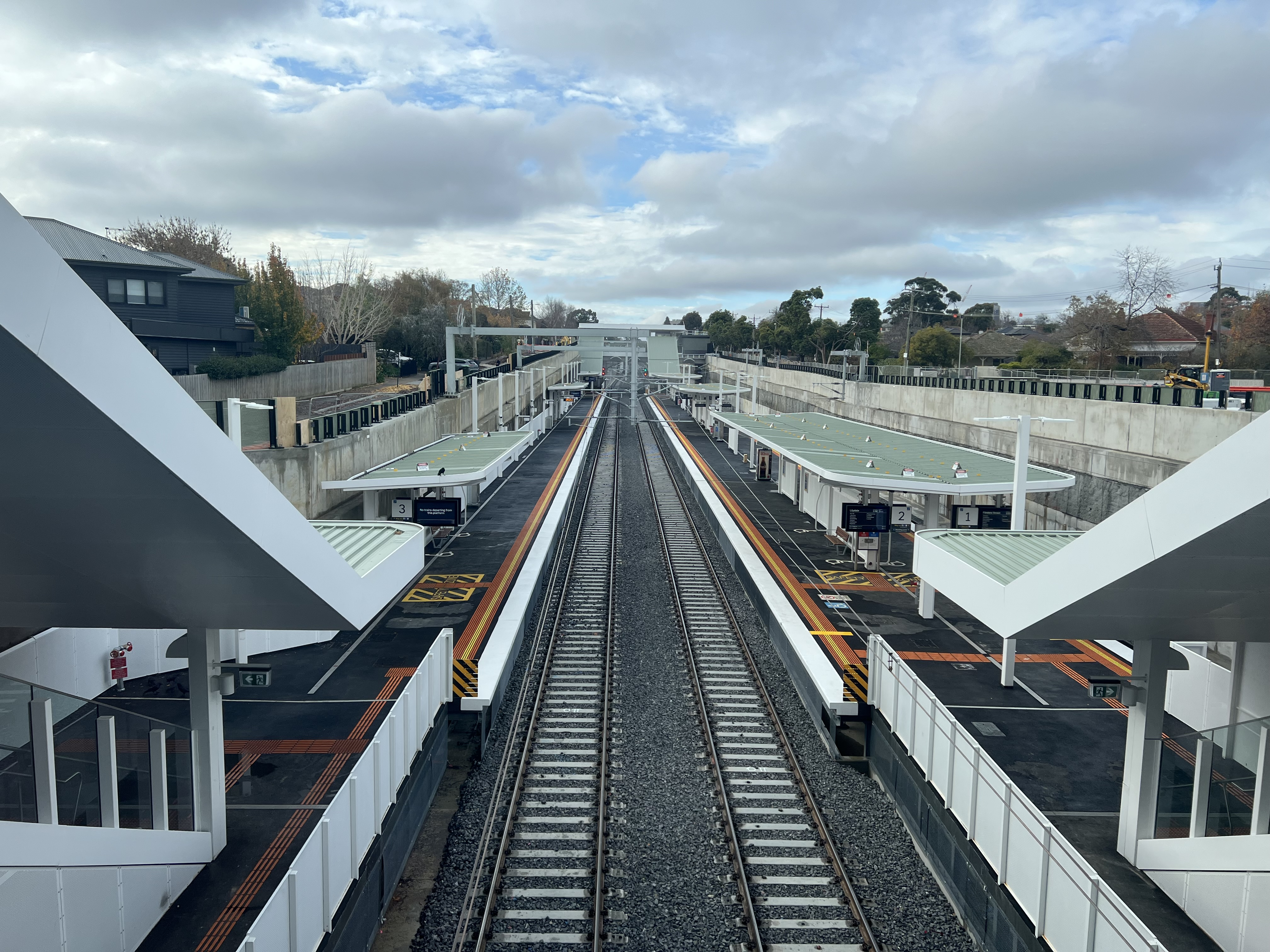
Eastbound view of Platforms 2 and 3 from western end concourse, June 2023

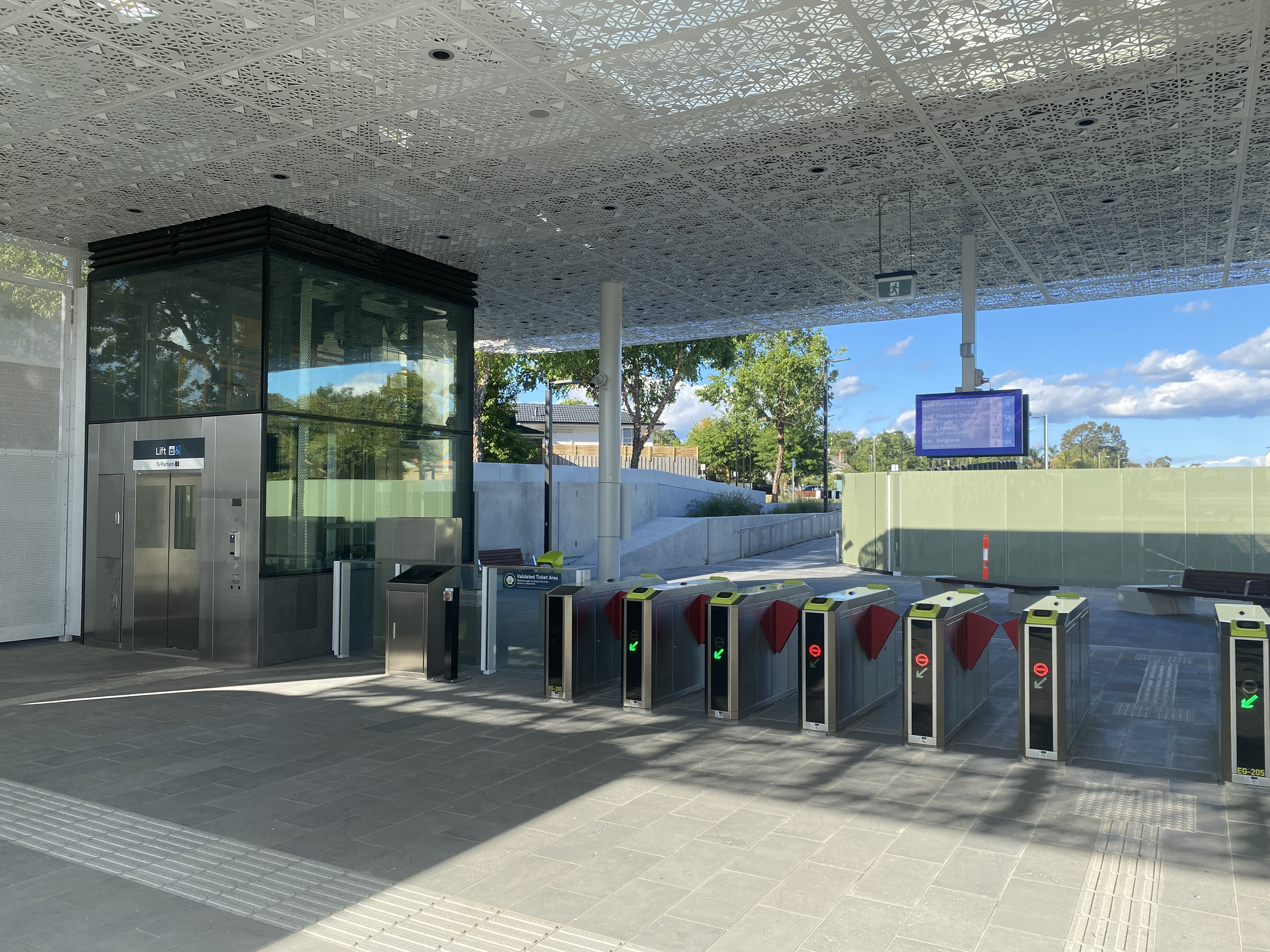
Station ticketing entrance, December 2023

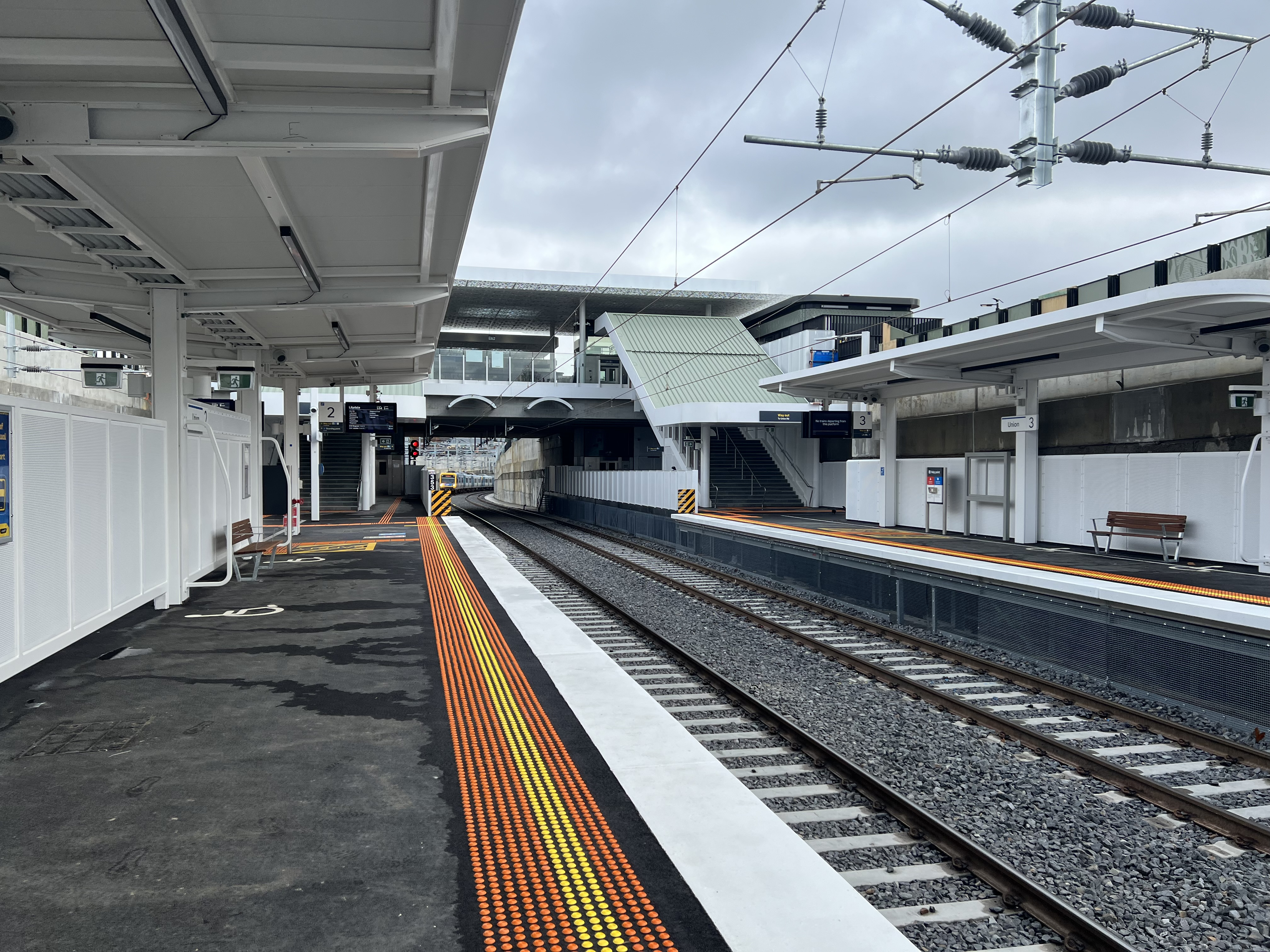
Westbound view from Platform 2 viewing station concourse, June 2023

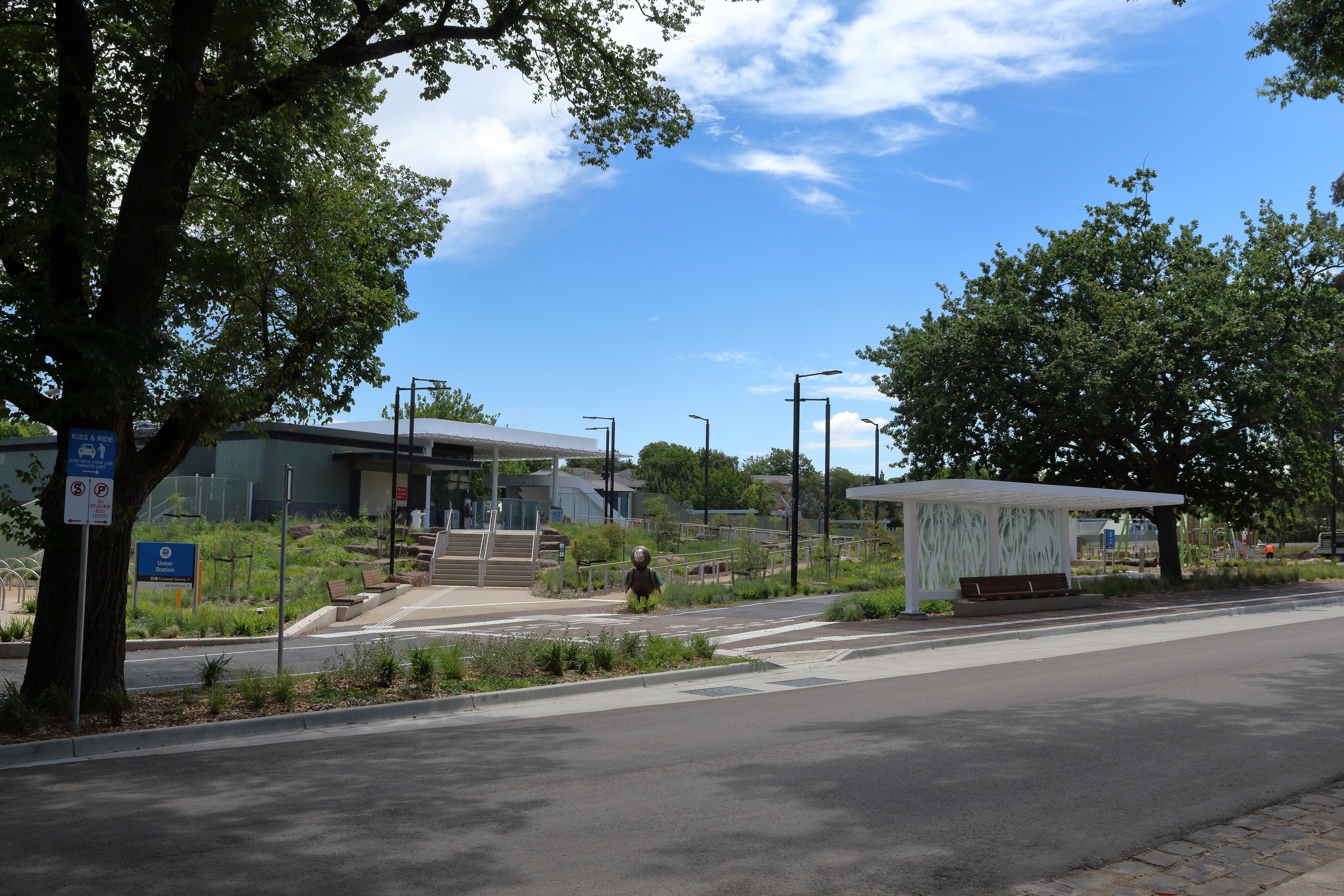
The completed landscaping at Union station from Windsor Crescent, January 2024

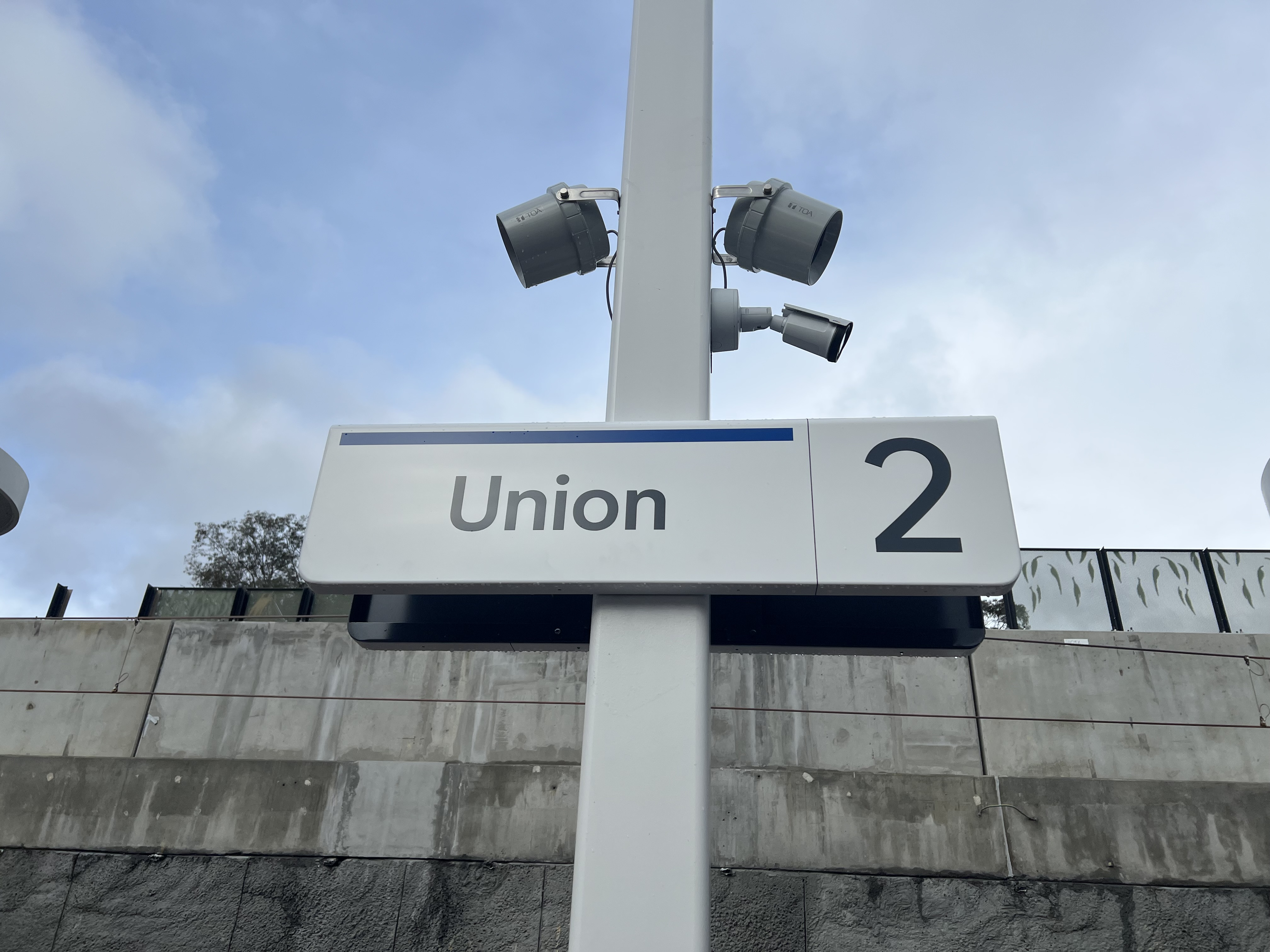
Platform 2 signage at Union station, June 2023

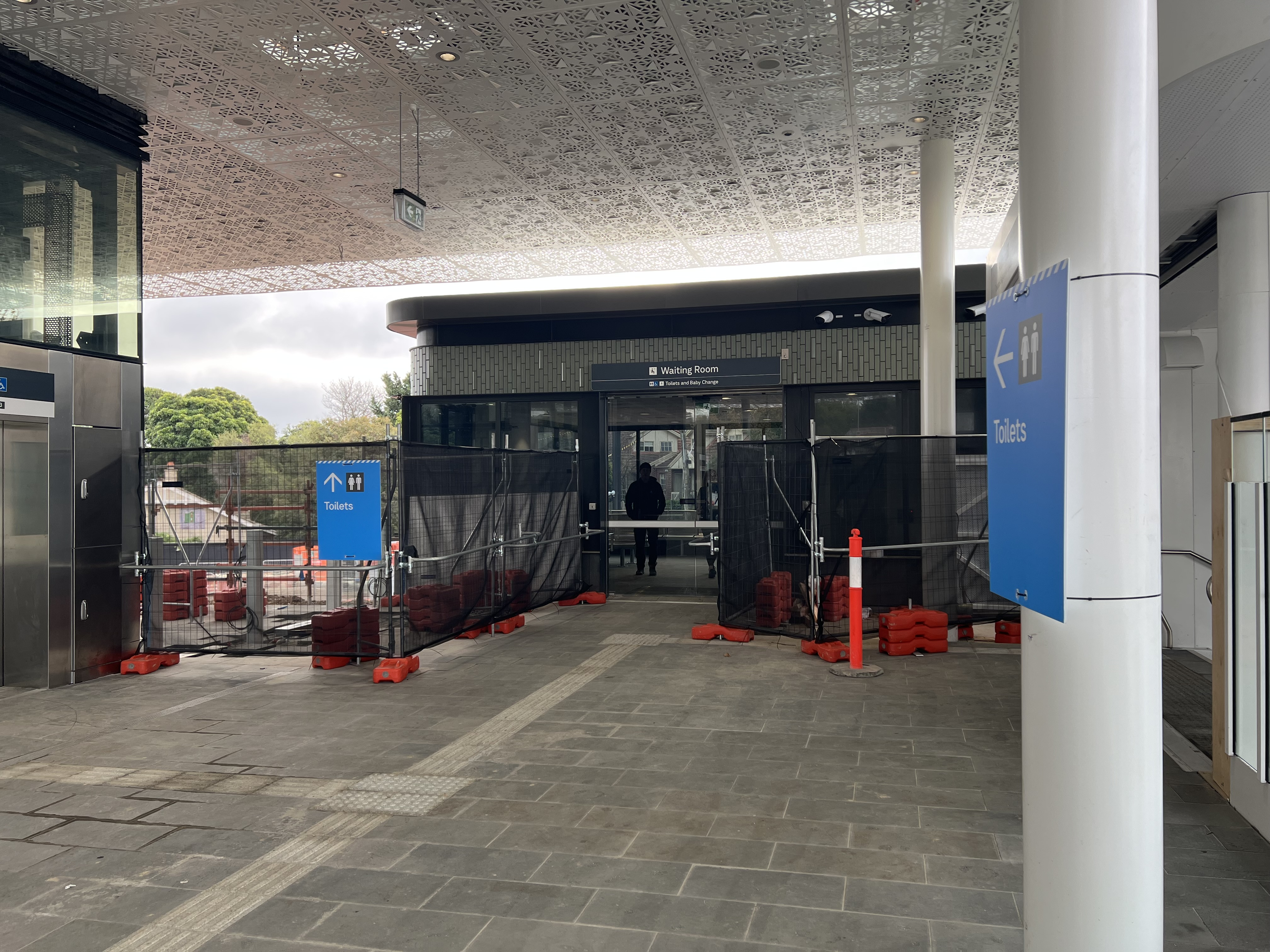
Station waiting area building from western end concourse, June 2023

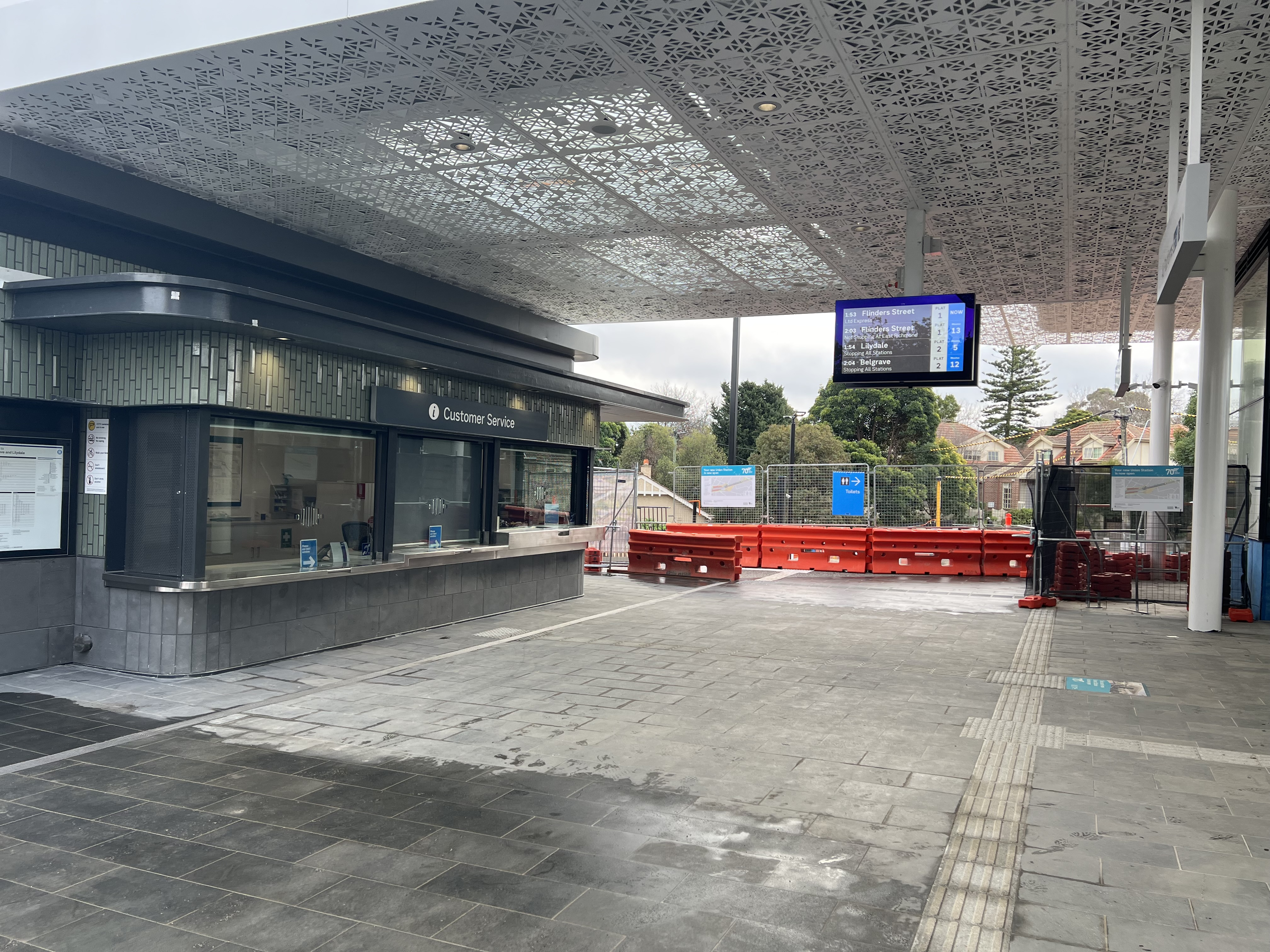
Station Customer Service building and western end concourse, June 2023

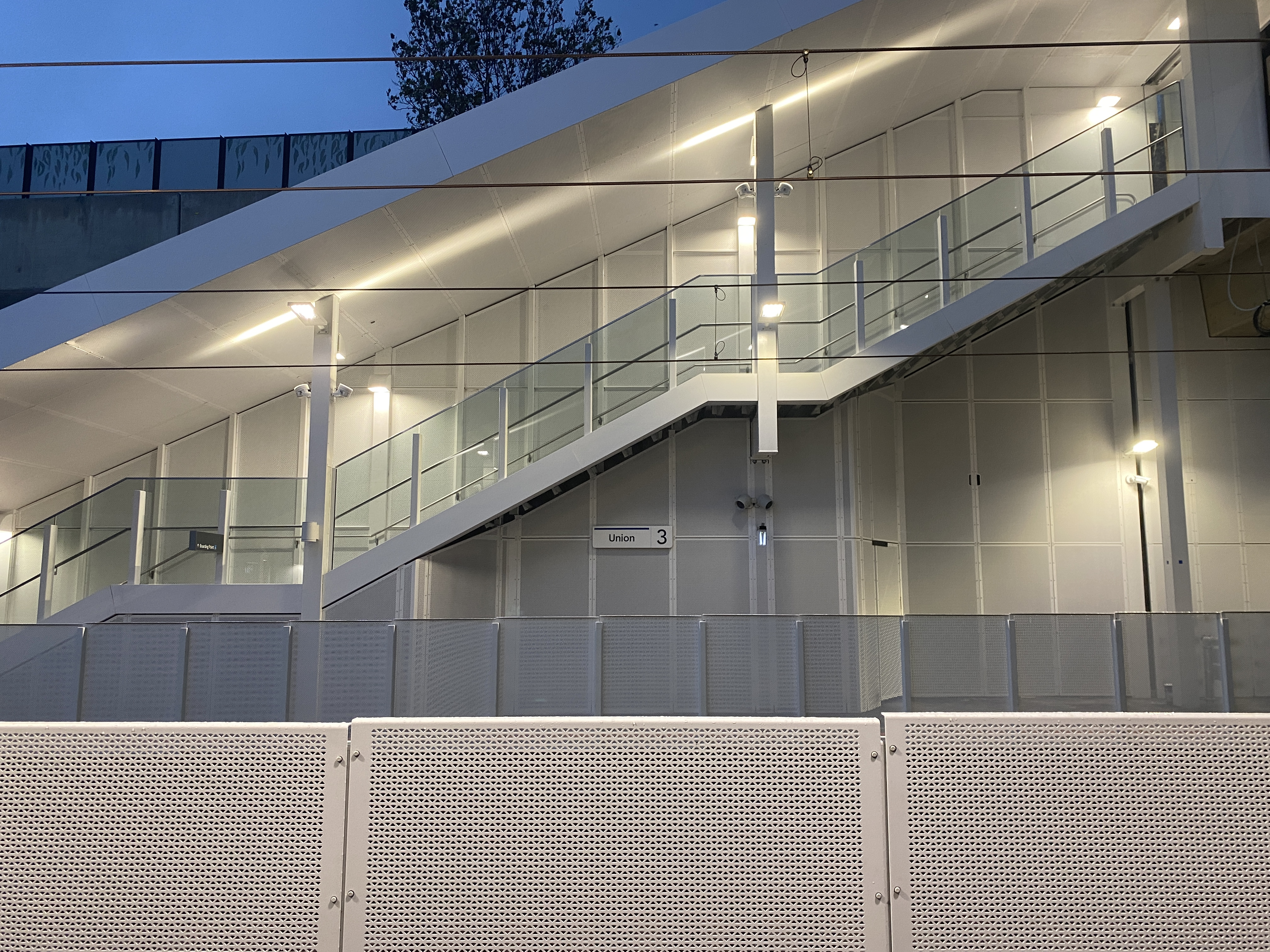
Platform 3 stairs to concourse viewed from platform 2, May 2023

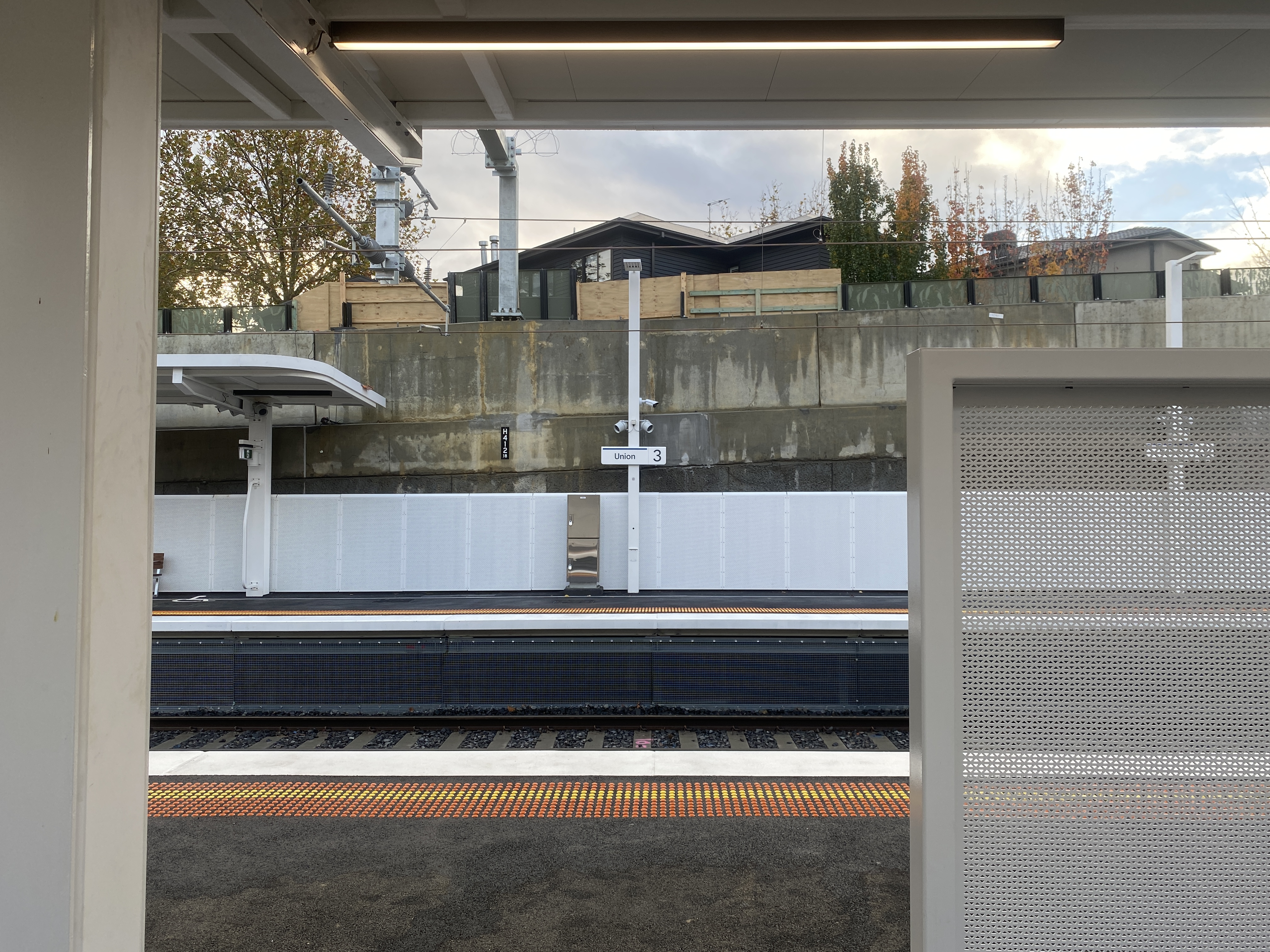
Platform 3 station signage and shelter viewed from Platform 1, May 2023

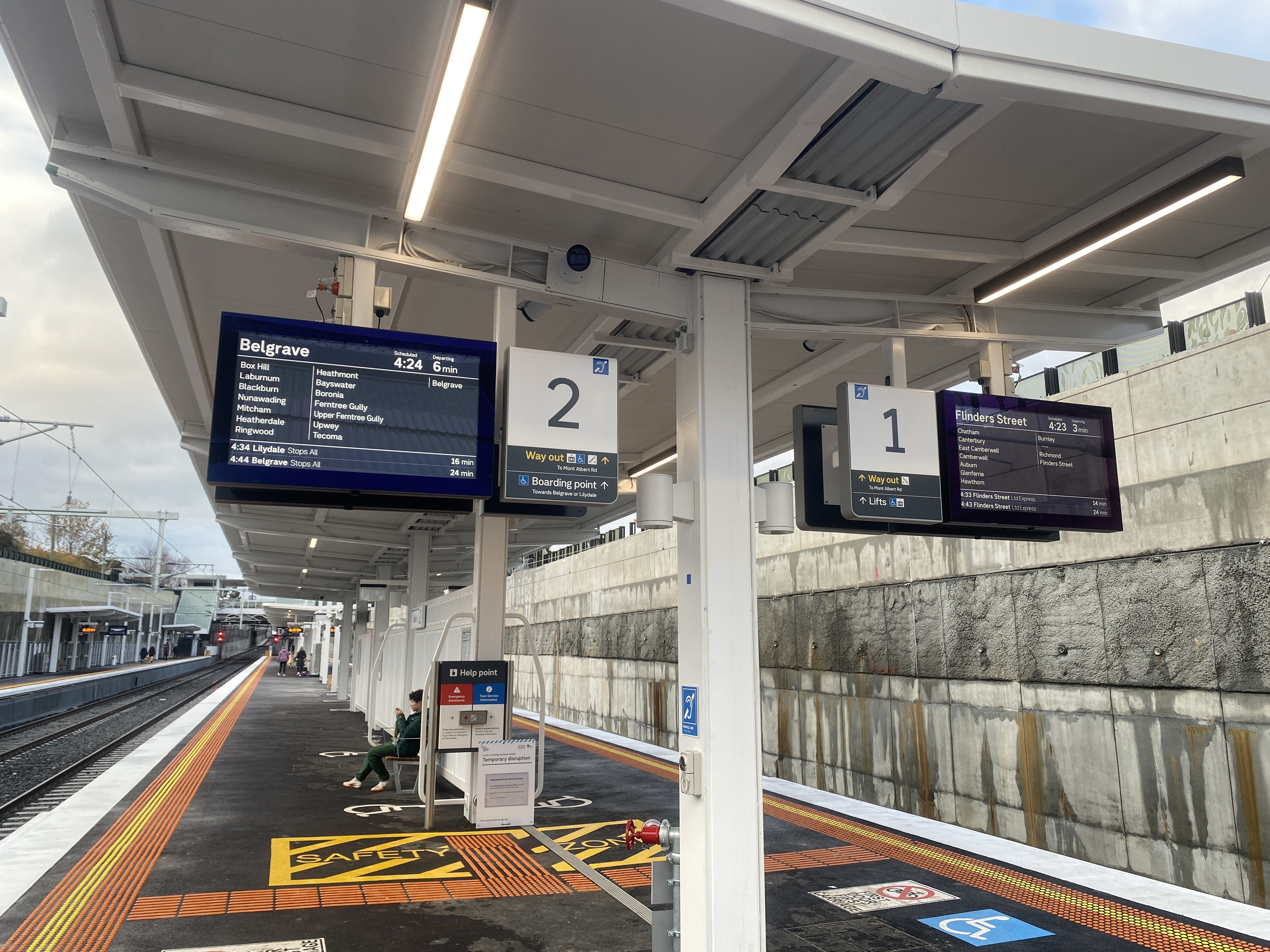
Platforms 1 and 2 station shelters, seating, Next Train Information and PIDS viewing Eastbound, May 2023
