= Lilydale line =

Passenger rail service in metropolitan Melbourne, Victoria, Australia

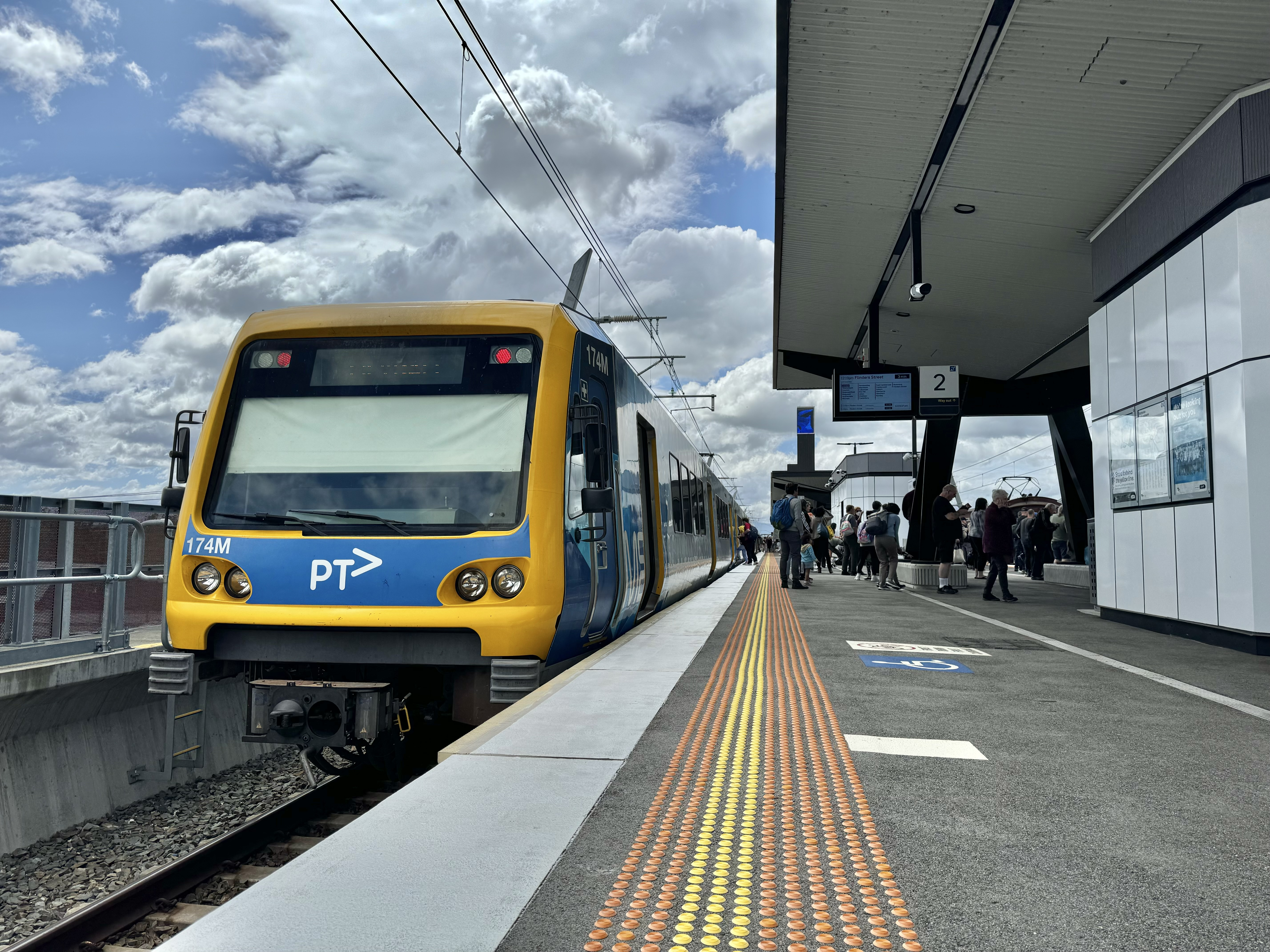
- An X'Trapolis train at Platform 2 at Lilydale railway station, the terminus of the Lilydale line, October 2024

Overview
- Service type: Commuter rail
- System: Melbourne railway network
- Status: Operational
- Locale: Melbourne, Victoria, Australia
- First service: 1 December 1882; 143 years ago
- Current operator: Metro Trains
- Former operators: Victorian Railways (VR) (1882–1974); VR as VicRail (1974–1983); MTA (The Met) (1983–1989); PTC (The Met) (1989–1998); Hillside Trains (1998–2000); Connex Melbourne (2000–2009)
- Website: Official website

Route
- Termini: Flinders Street; Lilydale
- Stops: 27 (including City Loop stations)
- Distance travelled: 38.8 km (24.1 mi)
- Average journey time: 59 minutes (not via City Loop)
- Service frequency: 6–20 minutes weekdays peak; 30 minutes weekdays off-peak; 20 minutes weekend daytime; 30 minutes nights; 60 minutes early weekend mornings; Double frequency between Flinders Street and Ringwood in combination with Belgrave line; Extra services run between Flinders Street and either Blackburn or Ringwood on weekdays

Technical
- Rolling stock: X'Trapolis 100
- Track gauge: 1,600 mm (5 ft 3 in)
- Electrification: 1500 V DC overhead
- Track owner: VicTrack

The Lilydale line is a commuter railway line on the Melbourne metropolitan railway network serving the city of Melbourne in Victoria, Australia. Operated by Metro Trains Melbourne, the line is coloured dark blue and is one of the four lines that constitute the Burnley group. It is the city's sixth-longest metropolitan railway line at 38.8 kilometres (24.1 mi). The line runs from Flinders Street station in central Melbourne to Lilydale station in the city's east, serving 27 stations via Burnley, Box Hill, Ringwood, and Croydon.

The line operates for approximately 19 hours a day (from approximately 5:00 am to around 12:00 am) with 24 hour service available on Friday and Saturday nights. During peak hours, headways of up to 15 minutes are operated, with services every 20–30 minutes during off-peak hours. Trains on the Lilydale line run in two three-car formations of X'Trapolis 100 trainsets.

Sections of the Lilydale line opened as early as 1859, with the line fully extended to Lilydale by 1882. The line was built to connect Melbourne and Ringwood with the rural towns of Croydon, Mooroolbark, and Lilydale, among others.

Since the 2010s, due to the heavily utilised infrastructure of the Lilydale line, significant improvements and upgrades have been made. Different packages of work have upgraded the corridor to replace sleepers, upgrade signalling technology, introduce new rolling stock, and remove remaining level crossings.

== History ==
=== 19th century ===
The line from Richmond to Hawthorn was opened initially to a temporary terminus at Pic Nic, just short of the Yarra River, in September 1860, and to Hawthorn in April 1861. It was extended to Camberwell in April 1882, then to Lilydale in early December of that same year. Duplication from East Richmond to Hawthorn occurred less than a month after the Lilydale extension opened. Soon after, the same section was converted to double-line telegraph safeworking, with the section from Hawthorn to Camberwell being converted to Staff and Ticket working.

In May 1885, Hawthorn to Camberwell was duplicated. Duplication was extended to Box Hill in December 1888.

=== 20th century ===
Automatic signalling was introduced in December 1907 with the conversion of the section from East Richmond to Hawthorn to semi-automatic signalling, followed by Richmond to East Richmond being converted to automatic signalling in August 1919. East Richmond to Camberwell was converted in two stages, both in October 1922, and Camberwell to Canterbury the following month. Electrification occurred between Flinders Street and Box Hill in December 1922 and extended to Ringwood the following month, then to Croydon in November 1925, and to Lilydale in October 1925. Conversion to automatic signalling resumed in April 1927 with the conversion of Canterbury to Surrey Hills, followed by Surrey Hills to Box Hill in October 1929.

The section from Croydon to Mooroolbark was duplicated in 1957, creating a long passing loop on this otherwise single-line section beyond Ringwood. The section from Mooroolbark to Lilydale remains a single track. Automatic signalling conversions resumed in July 1958 with the section from Box Hill to Blackburn, followed by Mitcham to Ringwood in September of that year, and Blackburn to Mitcham in November 1960. Hawthorn to Camberwell was triplicated in December 1963, and the triplication was extended to East Camberwell in November 1964. Richmond to Burnley was quadruplicated in 1966–67, and triplication was extended to Box Hill in December 1971, followed by Burnley to Hawthorn in August 1972. This left a short section of double track on the upside of Richmond, but this was quadruplicated with the construction of a flyover in 1973.

Ringwood to Croydon was converted to automatic signalling in November 1973 and duplicated in June 1984. Mooroolbark to Lilydale was converted to automatic signalling in June 1985.

The new Comeng trains were introduced to the Melbourne railway system in 1981. Initially, along with the Lilydale line, they were only allowed to operate on the Alamein, Belgrave, Dandenong and Glen Waverley lines, due to the width of the trains (3.05 metres (10 ft 0 in)). The Comeng trains were introduced with the intention of replacing the last of the Tait sets and the majority of the Harris sets.

=== 21st century ===
A 2007 restructure of train ticketing in Melbourne involved the removal of Zone 3, with Zone 3 stations being re-classified to Zone 2. This brought the cost of train fares down, improving system accessibility to the public.

== Future ==
=== Level Crossing Removals ===
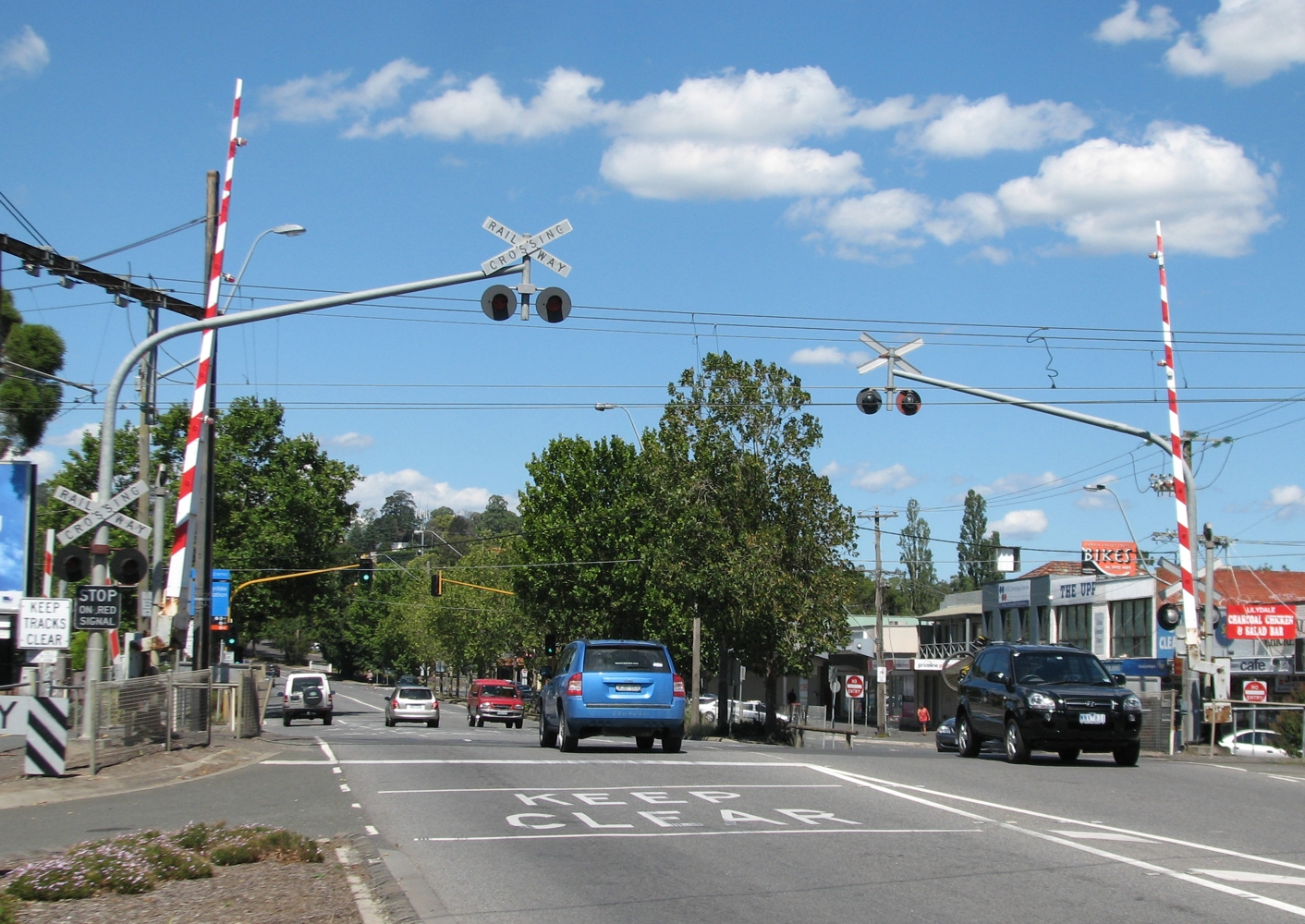
The level crossing at Maroondah Highway, Lilydale, prior to its 2021 removal.

The Level Crossing Removal Project has removed all seven of the remaining level crossings on the Lilydale line, with works completed in stages from 2017 to 2024, making it the first railway line to be entirely level crossing-free in Melbourne. Two crossings were removed at Blackburn Road, Blackburn, and Heatherdale Road, Ringwood in 2017, by lowering the rail line under the roads; Heatherdale station was rebuilt. In 2021, two level crossings were removed at Manchester Rd, Mooroolbark, and Maroondah Highway, Lilydale, by building new elevated stations at Mooroolbark and Lilydale which opened on 19 November 2021. In 2023, the level crossings at Union Road and Mont Albert Road were removed by lowering the rail line; Mont Albert and Surrey Hills stations were demolished and permanently closed on 17 February 2023 and a new station built in between, named Union, which opened on 22 May 2023. The last two crossings removed with grade separation involved lowering the rail line below Dublin Road in Ringwood East and elevating it onto a rail bridge above Coolstore Road in Croydon; both Ringwood East station and Croydon station were rebuilt, with Ringwood East station opening on 8 July 2024 while Croydon station opened on 12 August 2024. The final level crossing on the line, Cave Hill Road in Lilydale, was simply closed to car traffic, with an underpass being built for foot traffic, set to open in "spring 2024". There are also plans to add a new station between Lilydale and Mooroolbark stations in the Kinley Estate.

=== Duplication ===
The Network Development Plan – Metropolitan Rail, released in 2012, highlighted future upgrades for the rail corridor between Mooroolbark and Lilydale. The development plan highlighted the need for the track to be duplicated between Moroolbark and Lilydale as well as the construction of a new train maintenance facility in the Lilydale area within the next 20 years (by 2032). However, this project has not remained on the planning agenda, despite the significant work conducted by the Level Crossing Removal Project in the area, which has previously undertaken duplication works.

== Network and operations ==
=== Services ===
Services on the Lilydale line operate from approximately 5:00 am to around 12:00 daily. In general, during peak hours, train frequency is ~7 minutes on the Ringwood corridor (combined with the Belgrave line) and 10–20 minutes in the AM peak on the Lilydale line, while during non-peak hours, the frequency is reduced to 20–30 minutes throughout the entire route. On Friday nights and weekends, services run 24 hours a day, with 60 minute frequencies available outside of normal operating hours.

Train services on the Lilydale line are also subjected to maintenance and renewal work, usually on selected Fridays and Saturdays. Shuttle bus services are provided throughout the duration of work for affected commuters.

==== Stopping patterns ====
Legend: Station status

- ◼ Premium Station: Station staffed from first to last train
- ◻ Host Station: Usually staffed during the morning peak, however, this can vary for different stations on the network.

Legend: Stopping patterns
Some services do not operate via the City Loop

- ●: All trains stop
- ◐: Some services do not stop
- ▼ – Only outbound trains stop
- ▲ – Only inbound trains stop
- |: Trains pass and do not stop

Lilydale Services
Station	Zone	Local	Ltd Express	Camberwell	Blackburn	Ringwood	Mooroolbark	Shuttle
◼ Flinders Street	1	●	●	▲	●	●	●	
◼ Southern Cross	1	◐	◐		◐	◐	◐	
◼ Flagstaff	1	◐	◐		◐	◐	◐	
◼ Melbourne Central	1	◐	◐		◐	◐	◐	
◼ Parliament	1	◐	◐		◐	◐	◐	
◼ Richmond	1	●	●	▲	●	●	●	
East Richmond	1	▼	|	▲	◐	◐	|	
◼ Burnley	1	●	|	▲	◐	◐	|	
Hawthorn	1	●	|	▲	◐	◐	|	
◼ Glenferrie	1	●	◐	▲	●	●	◐	
◻ Auburn	1	●	|	▲	◐	◐	|	
◼ Camberwell	1	●	◐	▲	●	●	◐	
East Camberwell	1	●	◐		●	◐	|	
Canterbury	1/2	●	◐		●	◐	|	
Chatham	1/2	●	◐		●	◐	|	
◼ Union	1/2	●	◐		●	◐	◐	
◼ Box Hill	2	●	●		●	●	●	
Laburnum	2	●	◐		◐	◐	◐	
◼ Blackburn	2	●	●		●	◐	●	
◼ Nunawading	2	●	◐			◐	●	
◼ Mitcham	2	●	●			◐	●	
◻ Heatherdale	2	●	◐			◐	●	
◼ Ringwood	2	●	●			●	●	●
Ringwood East	2	●	●				●	●
◼ Croydon	2	●	●				●	●
◼ Mooroolbark	2	●	●				●	●
◼ Lilydale	2	●	●					◐

=== Operators ===
The Lilydale line has had a total of six operators since its opening in 1882. The majority of operations throughout its history have been government run: from its first service in 1882 until the 1999 privatisation of Melbourne's rail network, four different government operators have run the line. These operators, Victorian Railways, the Metropolitan Transit Authority, the Public Transport Corporation and Hillside Trains, have a combined operational length of 117 years. Hillside Trains was privatised in August 1999 and later rebranded as Connex Melbourne. Metro Trains Melbourne, the current private operator, then took over the operations in 2009. Both private operators have had a combined operational period of 27 years.

Past and present operators of the Lilydale line:
Operator	Assumed operations	Ceased operations	Length of operations
Victorian Railways	1882	1983	101 years
Metropolitan Transit Authority	1983	1989	6 years
Public Transport Corporation	1989	1998	9 years
Hillside Trains (government operator)	1998	1999	1 years
Connex Melbourne	1999	2009	10 years
Metro Trains Melbourne	2009	incumbent	16 years (ongoing)

=== Route ===
Interactive map of the Lilydale line in eastern Melbourne.

Lilydale (physical track)

Overview
- Status: Operational with passenger services from Flinders Street to Lilydale
- Owner: Victorian Railways (VR) (1882–1974); VR as VicRail (1974–1983); MTA (The Met) (1983–1989); PTC (The Met) (1989–1997); VicTrack (1997–Current)
- Locale: Melbourne, Victoria, Australia
- Termini: Flinders Street; Lilydale
- Continues as: Healesville; Warburton
- Connecting lines: All metropolitan, regional, and interstate
- Former connections: Healesville; Kew; Outer Circle; Warburton
- Stations: 27 current stations; 5 former stations; 1 former siding

Service
- Services: Lilydale

History
- Work began: 1 December 1882
- Opened: Princes Bridge to Richmond on 8 February 1859; To Pic-nic on 24 September 1860; To Hawthorn on 13 April 1861; Flinders Street to Princes Bridge on 18 December 1865; To Camberwell on 3 April 1882; To Lilydale on 1 December 1882
- Completed: 1 December 1882
- Electrified: Flinders Street to Box Hill on 19 December 1922; To Ringwood on 30 January 1923; To Croydon on 28 November 1924; To Lilydale on 30 November 1925

Technical
- Line length: 38.8 km (24.11 mi)
- Num of tracks: Twelve tracks: Flinders Street to Richmond; Four tracks: Richmond to Burnley; Triple track: Burnley to Box Hill; Double track: Box Hill to Mooroolbark; Single track: Mooroolbark to Lilydale
- Track gauge: 1,600 mm (5 ft 3 in)
- Electrification: 1500 V DC overhead
- Operating speed: 80 km/h (50 mph) – Electric
- Signalling: Automatic block signalling
- Maximum incline: 1 in 40 (2.5%)

The Lilydale line forms a curved route from the Melbourne central business district to its terminus in Lilydale. The route is 38.8 kilometres (24.1 mi) long and predominantly double-tracked, however, between Flinders Street station and Richmond, the track widens to 12 tracks, narrowing to four tracks between Richmond and Burnley before narrowing to 3 tracks between Burnley and Box Hill. Finally, the line narrows to two tracks between Box Hill and Mooroolbark before narrowing to a single track to its terminus. After Mooroolbark, passing loops and island platforms are present throughout the remaining track to allow trains to pass. Sections of the line have been elevated or lowered into a cutting to eliminate level crossings.

The line follows the same alignment as the Alamein, Belgrave, and Glen Waverley lines, with the four services splitting onto different routes at Burnley. The Alamein, Belgrave, and Lilydale services continue till the Alamein line splits off at Camberwell, with the two services continuing together till Ringwood. After departing Ringwood station, the Lilydale line heads north, with the Belgrave line heading in an eastern direction. Almost all of the rail line goes through built-up suburbs, however, the rail line becomes peri-urban towards its terminus in Lilydale.

=== Stations ===
The line serves 27 stations across 38.8 kilometres (24.1 mi) of track. The stations are a mix of elevated, lowered, underground, and ground level designs. Underground stations are present only in the City Loop and in Box Hill, with the majority of elevated and lowered stations being constructed as part of level crossing removals. From 2025, Ringwood East station will be lowered and Croydon station elevated as part of level crossing removal works.

Station	Accessibility	Opened	Terrain	Train connections	Other connections
Flinders Street	Yes—step free access	1854	Lowered	13 connections: * Alamein line; Belgrave line; Craigieburn line; Flemington Racecourse line; Frankston line; Gippsland line; Glen Waverley line; Hurstbridge line; Mernda line; Sandringham line; Upfield line; Werribee line; Williamstown line	Trams Buses
Southern Cross	Yes—step free access	1859	Ground level	25 connections: * Alamein line; Albury line; Ararat line; Ballarat line; Belgrave line; Bendigo line; Craigieburn line; Echuca line; Flemington Racecourse line; Frankston line; Geelong line; Gippsland line; Glen Waverley line; Hurstbridge line; Maryborough line; Mernda line; NSW TrainLink Southern; Seymour line; Shepparton line; Swan Hill line; The Overland; Upfield line; Warrnambool line; Werribee line; Williamstown line	Trams Buses Coaches SkyBus
Flagstaff	Yes—step free access	1985	Underground	8 connections: * Alamein line; Belgrave line; Craigieburn line; Frankston line; Glen Waverley line; Hurstbridge line; Mernda line; Upfield line	Trams
Melbourne Central	Yes—step free access	1981	Underground	8 connections: * Alamein line; Belgrave line; Craigieburn line; Frankston line; Glen Waverley line; Hurstbridge line; Mernda line; Upfield line	Trams Buses
Parliament	Yes—step free access	1983	Underground	8 connections: * Alamein line; Belgrave line; Craigieburn line; Frankston line; Glen Waverley line; Hurstbridge line; Mernda line; Upfield line	Trams
Richmond	No—steep ramp	1859	Elevated	6 connections: * Alamein line; Belgrave line; Frankston line; Gippsland line; Glen Waverley line; Sandringham line	Trams Buses
East Richmond	Yes—step free access	1860	Ground level	3 connections: Alamein line; Belgrave line; Glen Waverley line	Trams
Burnley	No—steep ramp	1880	Ground level	3 connections: Alamein line; Belgrave line; Glen Waverley line	Trams
Hawthorn	No—steep ramp	1881	Lowered	2 connections: Alamein line; Belgrave line	Trams Buses
Glenferrie	No—steep ramp	1882	Elevated	2 connections: Alamein line; Belgrave line	Trams
Auburn	No—steep ramp	1882	Ground level	2 connections: Alamein line; Belgrave line	Buses
Camberwell	No—steep ramp	1882	Lowered	2 connections: Alamein line; Belgrave line	Trams Buses
East Camberwell	No—steep ramp	1900	Ground level	1 connection: Belgrave line	
Canterbury	No—steep ramp	1882	Elevated	1 connection: Belgrave line	Buses
Chatham	No—steep ramp	1927	Ground level	1 connection: Belgrave line	
Union	Yes—step free access	2023	Lowered	1 connection: Belgrave line	Buses
Box Hill	Yes—step free access	1882	Underground	1 connection: Belgrave line	Trams Buses Coaches
Laburnum	Yes—step free access	1958	Elevated	1 connection: Belgrave line	Buses
Blackburn	Yes—step free access	1882	Ground level	1 connection: Belgrave line	Buses
Nunawading	Yes—step free access	1888	Lowered	1 connection: Belgrave line	Buses Coaches
Mitcham	Yes—step free access	1882	Lowered	1 connection: Belgrave line	Buses
Heatherdale	Yes—step free access	1958	Lowered	1 connection: Belgrave line	Buses
Ringwood	Yes—step free access	1882	Ground level	1 connection: Belgrave line	Buses Coaches
Ringwood East	Yes—step free access	1925	Lowered		Buses
Croydon	Yes—step free access	1882	Elevated		Buses Coaches
Mooroolbark	Yes—step free access	1887	Elevated		Buses
Lilydale	Yes—step free access	1882	Elevated		Buses Coaches

Station histories
Station	Opened	Closed	Age	Notes
Parliament	22 January 1983		43 years	
Melbourne Central	26 January 1981		45 years	Formerly Museum
Flagstaff	27 May 1985		41 years	
Southern Cross	17 January 1859		167 years	Formerly Batman's Hill; Formerly Spencer Street
Flinders Street	12 September 1854		172 years	Formerly Melbourne Terminus
Princes Bridge	8 February 1859	1 October 1866	7 years	
Princes Bridge	2 April 1879	30 June 1980	101 years	
Botanic Gardens	2 March 1859	c. April 1862	Approx. 3 years	
Punt Road	8 February 1859	12 December 1859	10 months	Replaced by Swan Street (200m further along line)
Richmond	12 December 1859		166 years	Formerly Swan Street
East Richmond	24 September 1860		166 years	Formerly Church Street
Burnley	1 May 1880		146 years	Formerly Burnley Street
Pic Nic	24 September 1860	6 October 1895	35 years	
Hawthorn	13 April 1861		165 years	
Glenferrie	3 April 1882		144 years	Formerly Glenferrie Road
Auburn	3 April 1882		144 years	Formerly Auburn Road
Camberwell	3 April 1882		144 years	
East Camberwell	14 May 1900		126 years	
Canterbury	1 December 1882		143 years	
Chatham	1 April 1927		99 years	
Surrey Hills	13 August 1883	17 February 2023	139 years	
Union	22 May 2023		3 years	
Mont Albert	11 August 1890	17 February 2023	132 years	
Box Hill	1 December 1882		143 years	
Laburnum	13 July 1958		68 years	
Blackburn	25 December 1882		143 years	
Nunawading	4 June 1888		138 years	Formerly Turnstall
Mitcham	25 December 1882		143 years	
Heatherdale	7 September 1958		68 years	
Ringwood	1 December 1882		143 years	
Ringwood East	18 May 1925		101 years	
Croydon	1 December 1882		143 years	Formerly Warrandyte
Mooroolbark	10 October 1887		139 years	
Cave Hill	?	?		
Lilydale	1 December 1882		143 years	

== Infrastructure ==
=== Rolling stock ===
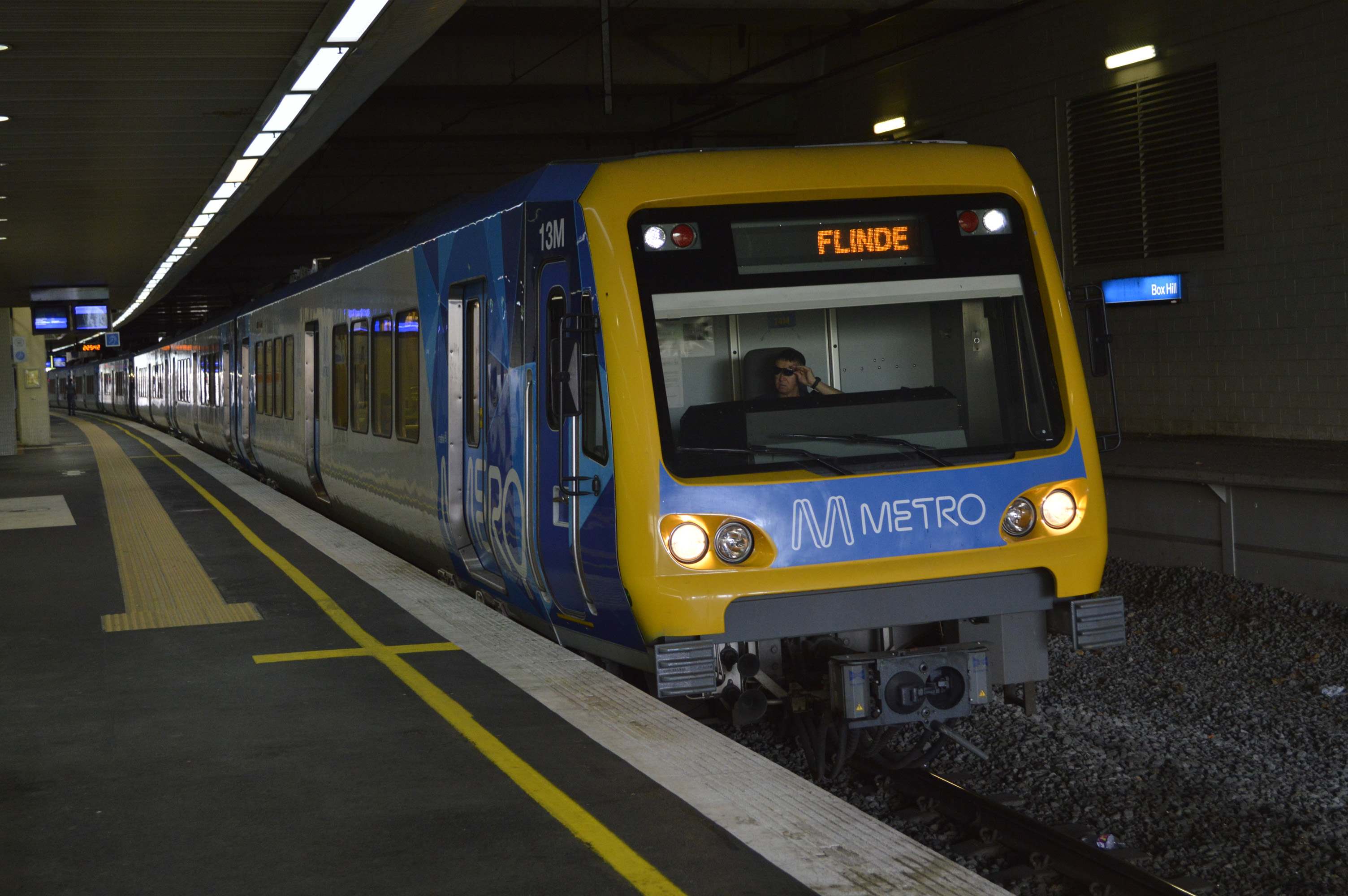
An X'Trapolis 100 train preparing to departing from Platform 2 at Box Hill station.

The Lilydale line uses X'Trapolis 100 electric multiple unit (EMU) trains operating in a two three-car configuration, with three doors per side on each carriage and can accommodate up to 432 seated passengers in each six car configuration. The trains were originally built between 2002 and 2004, as well as between 2009 and 2020 with a total of 212 three-car sets constructed. The trains are shared with seven other metropolitan train lines and have been in service since 2003.

Alongside the passenger trains, Lilydale line tracks and equipment are maintained by a fleet of engineering trains. The four types of engineering trains are: the shunting train; designed for moving trains along non-electrified corridors and for transporting other maintenance locomotives, for track evaluation; designed for evaluating track and its condition, the overhead inspection train; designed for overhead wiring inspection, and the infrastructure evaluation carriage designed for general infrastructure evaluation. Most of these trains are repurposed locomotives previously used by V/Line, Metro Trains, and the Southern Shorthaul Railroad.

=== Accessibility ===
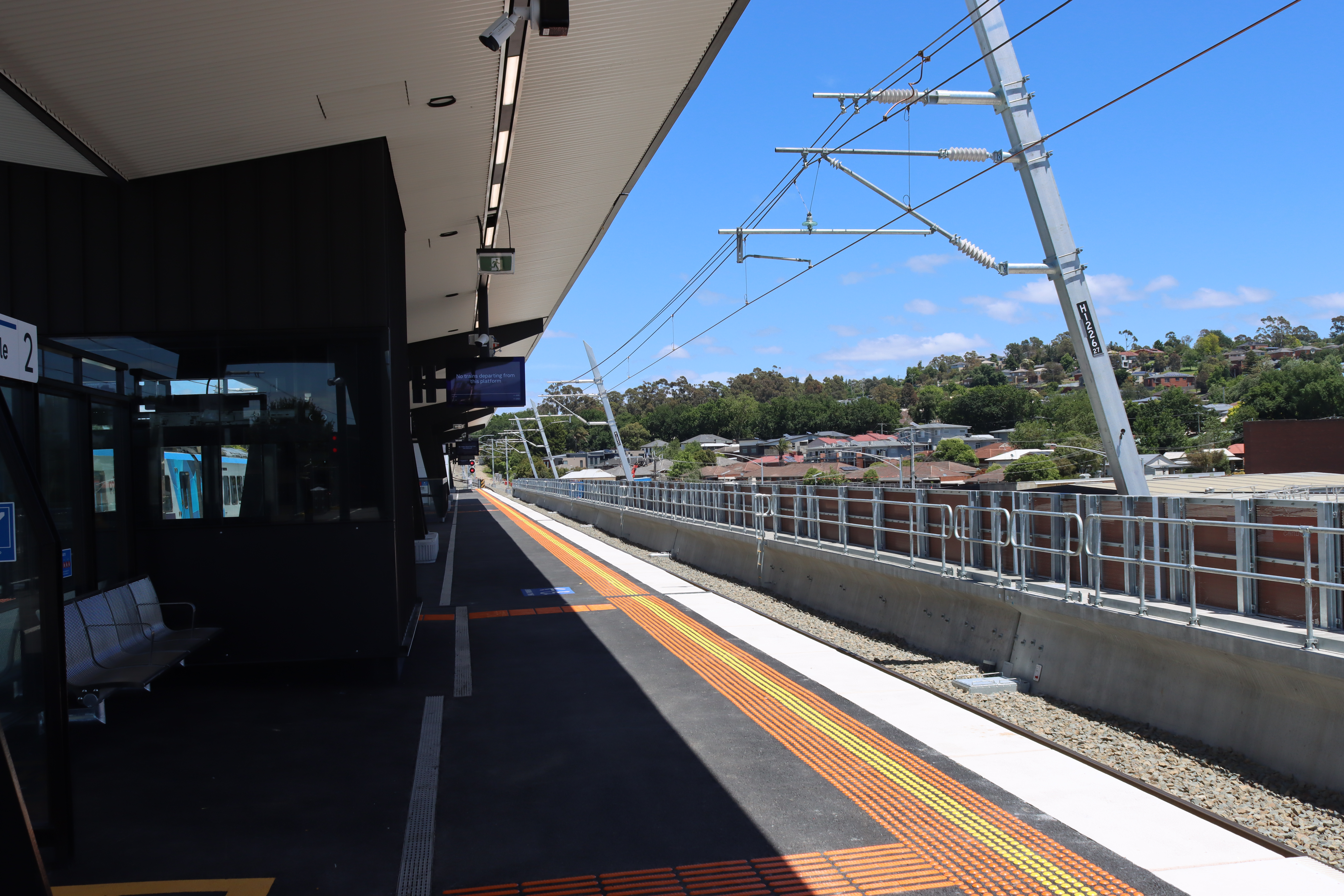
The rebuilt Lilydale station features tactile boarding indicators and elevators

All stations that are new or rebuilt are fully accessible. Projects improving station accessibility have included the Level Crossing Removal Project, which involves station rebuilds and upgrades, and individual station upgrade projects. These works have made significant strides in improving network accessibility, with more than 59% of Lilydale line stations classified as fully accessible.

=== Signalling ===
The Lilydale line employs a combination of three-position signalling alongside automatic block signalling (ABS) and automatic track control (ATC) safeworking systems, wherein the former involves different signal 'blocks', while the latter encompass a variety of mechanisms for enhancing safety and control on the track. Three-position signalling was first introduced on the line in 1919, with the final section of the line converted to the new type of signalling by 1985. Automatic and track controls are used with the centre line between Burnley and Box Hill, and between Mooroolbark and the line's terminus in Lilydale.
