= Ringwood East railway station =

Railway station in Melbourne, Australia

Ringwood East
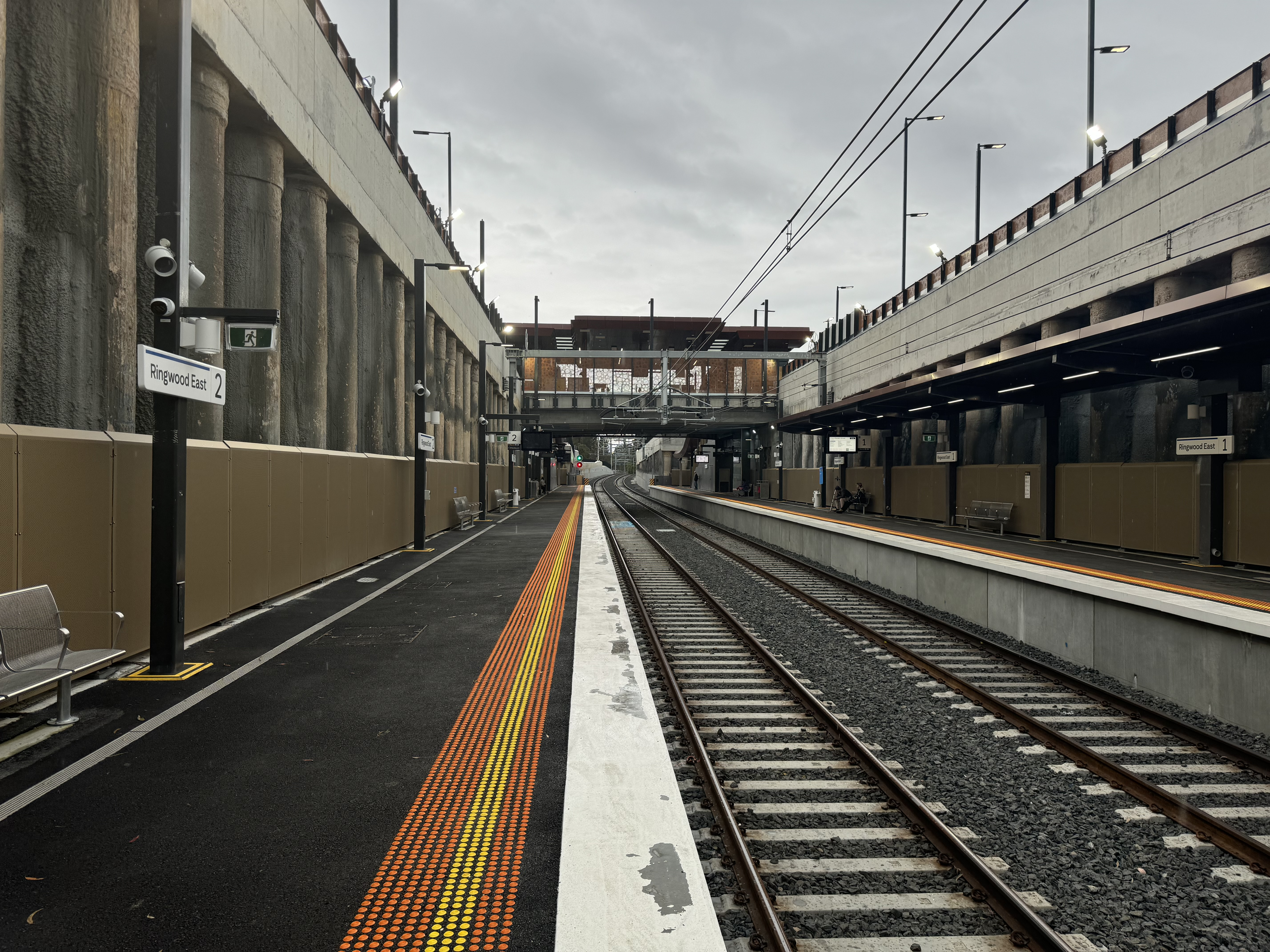
- Eastbound view from Platform 2, October 2024

General information
- Location: Railway Avenue, Ringwood East, Victoria 3135; City of Maroondah; Australia
- Coordinates: 37°48′43″S 145°14′59″E
- System: PTV commuter rail station
- Owner: VicTrack
- Operator: Metro Trains
- Line: Lilydale
- Distance: 27.76 kilometres from Southern Cross
- Platforms: 2 side
- Tracks: 2
- Connections: Bus

Construction
- Structure type: Below ground
- Parking: 460
- Cycle facilities: Yes
- Accessible: Yes — step free access

Other information
- Status: Operational, unstaffed
- Station code: RWE
- Fare zone: Myki zone 2
- Website: Public Transport Victoria

History
- Opened: 18 May 1925; 101 years ago
- Rebuilt: 1975; 30 June 1984; 8 July 2024 (LXRP)
- Electrified: November 1924 (1500 V DC overhead)

Passengers
- 2005–2006: 324,863
- 2006–2007: 352,063 ▲8.37%
- 2007–2008: 425,013 ▲20.72%
- 2008–2009: 385,880 ▼9.2%
- 2009–2010: 385,573 ▼0.07%
- 2010–2011: 418,303 ▲8.48%
- 2011–2012: 387,010 ▼7.48%
- 2012–2013: Not measured
- 2013–2014: 402,636 ▲4.03%
- 2014–2015: 407,041 ▲1.09%
- 2015–2016: 457,004 ▲12.27%
- 2016–2017: 416,834 ▼8.78%
- 2017–2018: 443,363 ▲6.36%
- 2018–2019: 460,250 ▲3.8%
- 2019–2020: 369,900 ▼19.63%
- 2020–2021: 140,600 ▼61.99%
- 2021–2022: 133,050 ▼5.36%
- 2022–2023: 206,700 ▲55.35%
- 2023–2024: 213,500 ▲3.29%
- 2024–2025: 268,800 ▲25.9%

Services
Preceding station	Metro Trains	Following station
Ringwood towards Flinders Street	Lilydale line	Croydon towards Lilydale
Ringwood Terminus	Lilydale line Shuttle service	Croydon towards Lilydale
Track layout
Location

Ringwood East station is a railway station operated by Metro Trains Melbourne on the Lilydale line, part of the Melbourne rail network. It serves the eastern Melbourne suburb of Ringwood East in Victoria, Australia. It was opened on 18 May 1925, and the current station was opened in July 2024 as part of the Level Crossing Removal Project.

== History ==
In 1975, new ground-level station buildings were provided.

On 30 June 1984, an island platform was opened, as part of the duplication of the line between Ringwood and Croydon. In that same year, boom barriers were provided at the former Dublin Road level crossing, which was located in the up direction from the station.

Under the Level Crossing Removal Project, the Dublin Road level crossing was grade separated, with the railway being lowered into in a cutting under the road, and the construction of a new station. Work began in May 2023. The Dublin Road level crossing and old ground-level Ringwood East station were closed on 24 May 2024, and the new station opened to passengers on 8 July 2024.

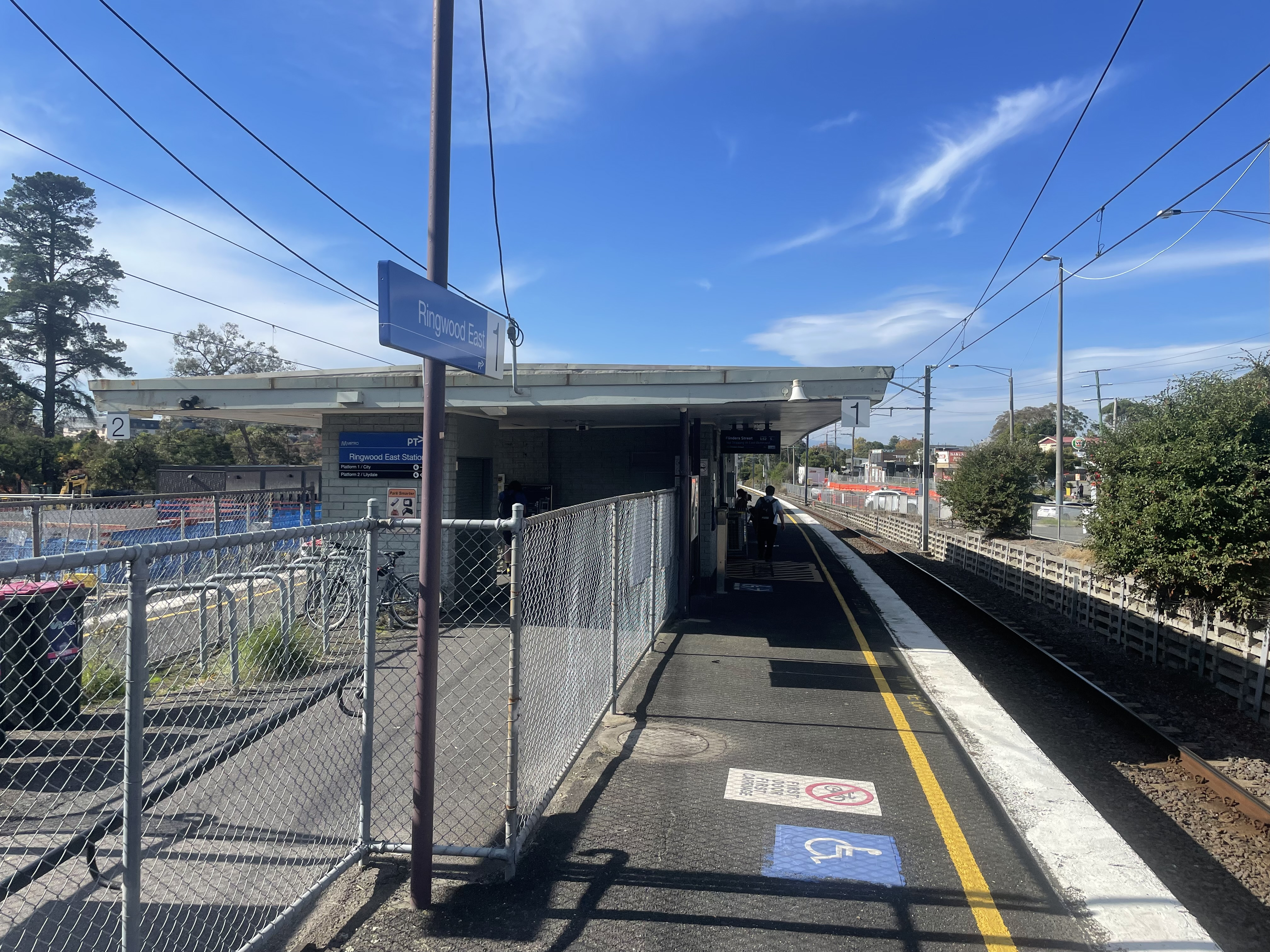
The 1984 built island platform, seen months before demolition in April 2024.

== Platforms and services ==
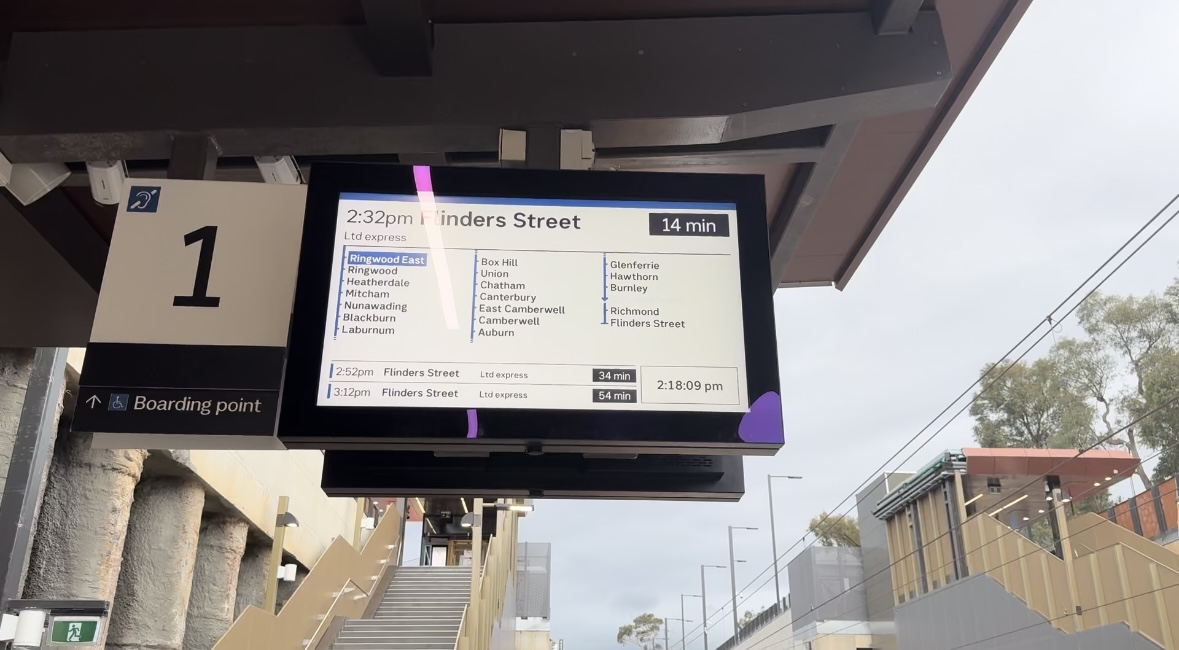
A PID on Platform 1 displaying a Flinders Street-bound service, October 2024

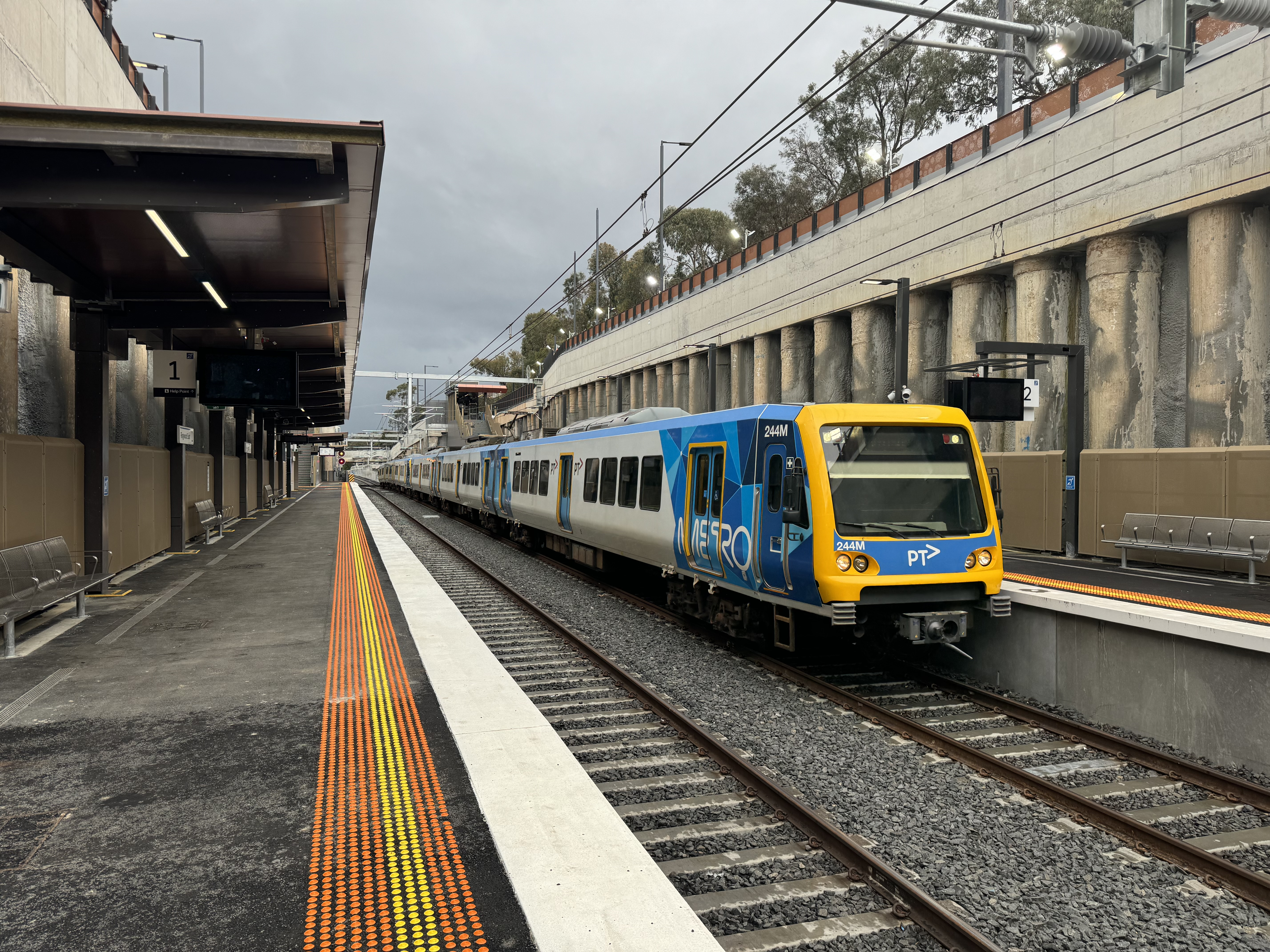
An X'Trapolis train on a Lilydale-bound service arriving at Platform 2, October 2024

Ringwood East has two side platforms and is served by Lilydale line trains. It is in Myki ticketing Zone 2. There are 330 car parking spaces.

Ringwood East platform arrangement
Platform	Line	Destination	Via	Service Type	Notes	Source
1	Lilydale line	Ringwood, Flinders Street	City Loop	All stations and limited express services	See City Loop for operating patterns	
2	Lilydale line	Mooroolbark, Lilydale		All stations		

== Transport links ==
Kinetic Melbourne operates one bus route via Ringwood East station, under contract to Public Transport Victoria:

- 669 : Ringwood – Croydon. Stops include Ringwood and Croydon stations.
