= East Richmond railway station, Melbourne =

Railway station in Melbourne, Australia

East Richmond
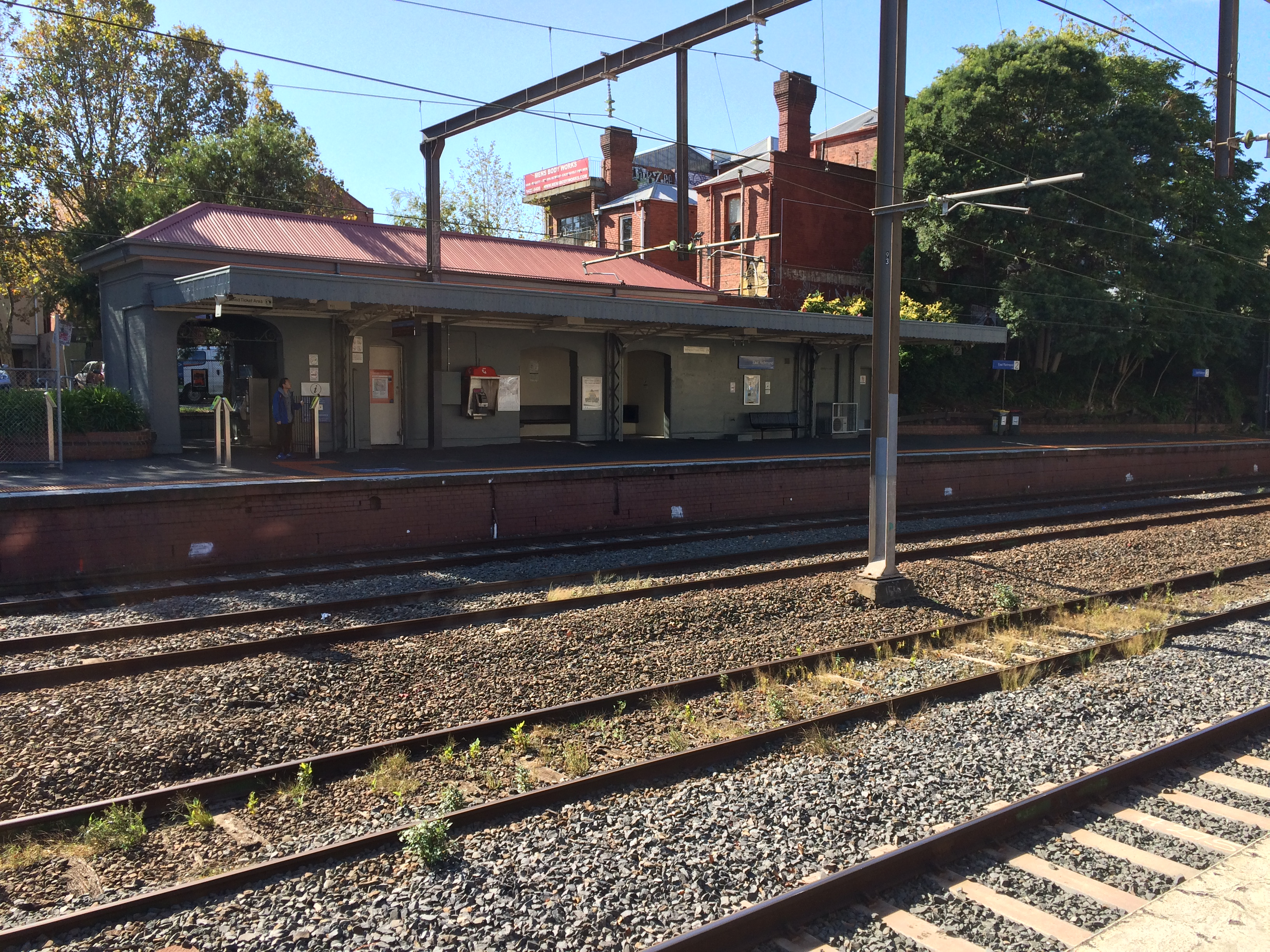
- Station building on Platform 2, May 2017

General information
- Location: Church Street, Richmond, Victoria 3121; City of Yarra; Australia
- Coordinates: 37°49′35″S 144°59′47″E
- System: PTV commuter rail station
- Owner: VicTrack
- Operator: Metro Trains
- Lines: Lilydale (Note: to Lilydale only) Belgrave (Note: to Flinders Street only) Alamein (Note: Peak only); Glen Waverley
- Distance: 4.37 kilometres from Southern Cross
- Platforms: 2 side
- Tracks: 4
- Connections: Tram

Construction
- Structure type: Ground
- Parking: Yes
- Accessible: Yes—step free access

Other information
- Status: Operational, unstaffed
- Station code: ERM
- Fare zone: Myki zone 1
- Website: Public Transport Victoria

History
- Opened: 24 September 1860; 166 years ago
- Rebuilt: 9 January 1967
- Electrified: December 1922 (1500 V DC overhead)
- Former names: Church Street (1860–1866)

Passengers
- 2005–2006: 533,461
- 2006–2007: 580,091 ▲8.74%
- 2007–2008: 593,135 ▲2.24%
- 2008–2009: 535,903 ▼9.64%
- 2009–2010: 536,007 ▲0.01%
- 2010–2011: 662,361 ▲23.57%
- 2011–2012: 749,044 ▲13.08%
- 2012–2013: Not measured
- 2013–2014: 525,359 ▼29.86%
- 2014–2015: 552,350 ▲5.13%
- 2015–2016: 558,084 ▲1.03%
- 2016–2017: 612,505 ▲9.75%
- 2017–2018: 642,414 ▲4.88%
- 2018–2019: 666,900 ▲3.81%
- 2019–2020: 506,300 ▼24.08%
- 2020–2021: 198,600 ▼60.77%
- 2021–2022: 251,800 ▲26.78%
- 2022–2023: 457,450 ▲81.67%
- 2023–2024: 537,300 ▲17.46%
- 2024–2025: 575,900 ▲7.06%

Services
| Preceding station | Metro Trains | Following station |
|---|---|---|
| Richmond towards Flinders Street | Lilydale line | Burnley towards Blackburn or Ringwood |
| Richmond towards Flinders Street | Alamein line Peak only | Burnley towards Alamein |
| Richmond towards Flinders Street | Glen Waverley line | Burnley towards Glen Waverley |
Limited services
| Richmond towards Flinders Street | Lilydale line | Burnley towards Lilydale |
| Richmond towards Flinders Street | Belgrave line | Burnley towards Belgrave |
Track layout
Location

East Richmond station is a railway station operated by Metro Trains Melbourne on the Alamein, Belgrave, Glen Waverley and Lilydale lines, part of the Melbourne rail network. It serves the inner eastern Melbourne suburbs of Richmond and Cremorne. The station was opened on 24 September 1860, and the current station layout dates from 1967.

Opened as Church Street, the station was given its current name on 1 January 1867.

== History ==
East Richmond station was opened by the Melbourne & Suburban Railway Company, when its service to Hawthorn began. A level crossing was formerly located at Green Street, near the up end of the station, which was removed on 12 March 1965, along with the associated signal box, and replaced with a pedestrian subway.

In the 1960s, the line through the station was quadrupled, the track was lowered by 1.2 metres, and a new Platform 1 was built. The first of the two new tracks was commissioned on 1 August 1966, and the second on 9 January 1967, along with the new platform. In 1980, crossovers were provided at the up end of the station.

The 2010/2011 state budget allocated $83.7 million to upgrade East Richmond to a premium station, along with nineteen others. However, the incoming Baillieu government cancelled those plans in 2011.

== Platforms and services ==
East Richmond station has two side platforms, and a total of four tracks operating through it. Its location in close proximity to the CBD means that, although a large number of services pass through the station, only a limited number stop there, largely because Richmond is only a few hundred metres away in Swan Street.

Services to and from Lilydale and Belgrave never stop at East Richmond, with the exception of the weekdays 05:12 service from Belgrave to Flinders Street, and the weekdays 07:29 service from Flinders Street to Lilydale. All Glen Waverley services stop here, except for some Glen Waverley-bound services in the morning and afternoon peak. Most services to and from Alamein, Blackburn and Ringwood stop here.

It is served by Lilydale, Belgrave, Alamein and Glen Waverley line trains.

East Richmond platform arrangement
| Platform | Line | Destination | Via | Service Type | Notes | Source |
|---|---|---|---|---|---|---|
| 1 | Alamein line Belgrave line Glen Waverley line | Flinders Street | City Loop | All stations | Single morning service runs via the City Loop. | |
| 1 | Belgrave line Lilydale line | Flinders Street | | All stations | Night network only. | |
| 2 | Alamein line Glen Waverley line Lilydale line | Glen Waverley, Alamein, Blackburn, Ringwood or Lilydale | | All stations | Single Lilydale service per weekday. | |
| 2 | Belgrave line Lilydale line | Lilydale or Belgrave | | All stations | Night network only. | |

== Transport links ==
Yarra Trams operates two routes via East Richmond station:

- : Waterfront City Docklands – Wattle Park
- : North Richmond – Balaclava
