= Burnley railway station =

Railway station in Melbourne, Australia

Burnley
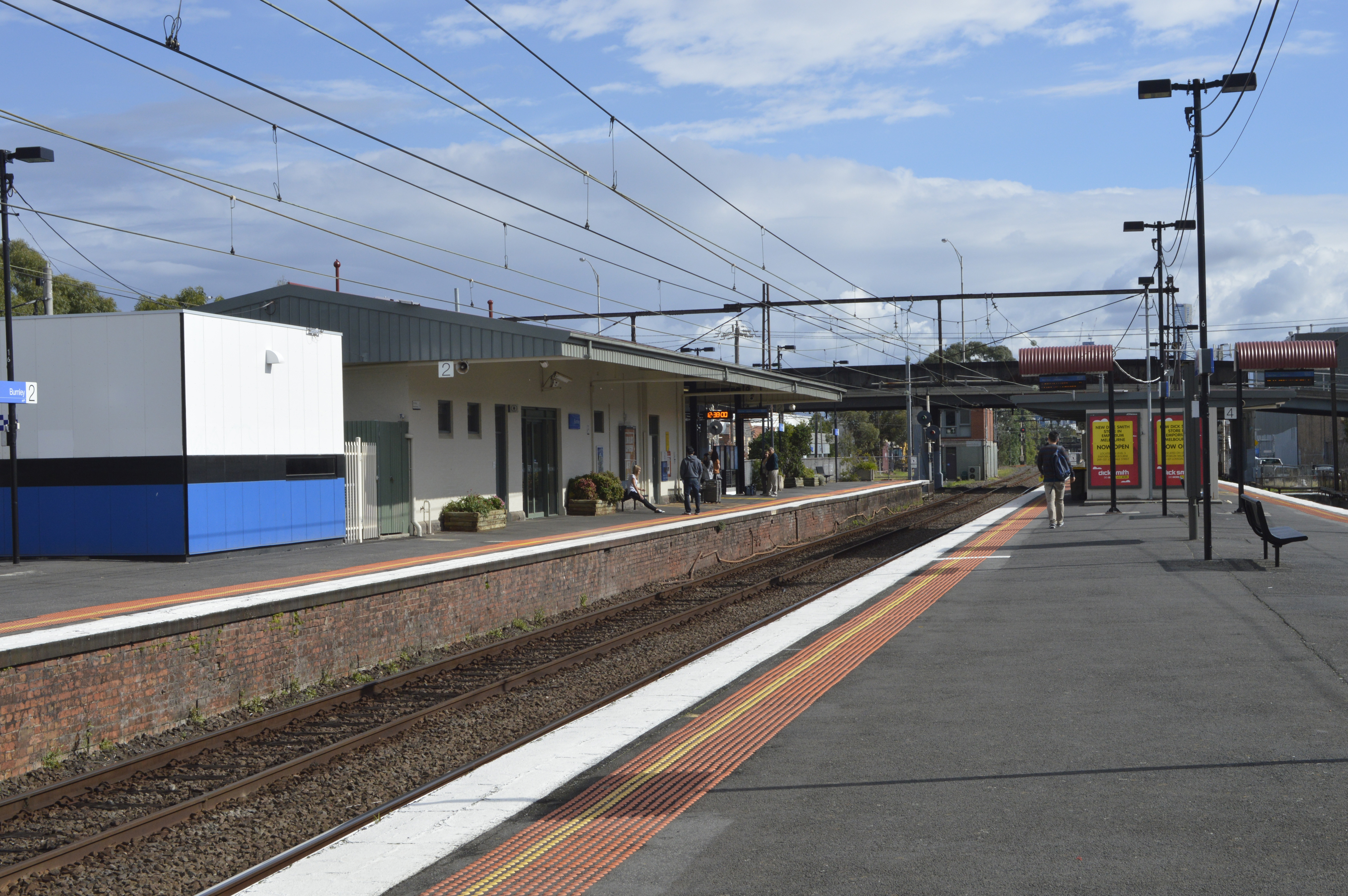
- Westbound view from Platform 3, May 2014

General information
- Location: Burnley Street, Burnley, Victoria 3121; City of Yarra; Australia
- Coordinates: 37°49′39″S 145°00′24″E
- System: PTV commuter rail station
- Owner: VicTrack
- Operator: Metro Trains
- Lines: Lilydale Belgrave Alamein (Note: Peak only); Glen Waverley
- Distance: 5.33 kilometres from Southern Cross
- Platforms: 4 (2 island)
- Tracks: 4
- Connections: Tram

Construction
- Structure type: Ground
- Parking: Yes
- Accessible: No—steep ramp

Other information
- Status: Operational, premium station
- Station code: BLY
- Fare zone: Myki zone 1
- Website: Public Transport Victoria

History
- Opened: 1 May 1880; 146 years ago
- Electrified: December 1922 (1500 V DC overhead)
- Former names: Burnley Street (1880–1882)

Passengers
- 2005–2006: 660,765
- 2006–2007: 716,396 ▲8.41%
- 2007–2008: 790,319 ▲10.31%
- 2008–2009: 835,919 ▲5.76%
- 2009–2010: 872,310 ▲4.35%
- 2010–2011: 927,393 ▲6.31%
- 2011–2012: 841,847 ▼9.22%
- 2012–2013: Not measured
- 2013–2014: 722,791 ▼14.14%
- 2014–2015: 712,753 ▼1.38%
- 2015–2016: 732,967 ▲2.83%
- 2016–2017: 791,201 ▲7.94%
- 2017–2018: 784,937 ▼0.79%
- 2018–2019: 865,300 ▲10.24%
- 2019–2020: 633,700 ▼26.76%
- 2020–2021: 303,500 ▼52.1%
- 2021–2022: 455,750 ▲50.16%
- 2022–2023: 709,000 ▲55.57%
- 2023–2024: 730,000 ▲2.96%
- 2024–2025: 881,250 ▲20.72%

Services
Preceding station	Metro Trains	Following station
East Richmond towards Flinders Street	Lilydale line	Hawthorn towards Alamein, Belgrave or Lilydale
East Richmond towards Flinders Street	Belgrave line	Hawthorn towards Alamein, Belgrave or Lilydale
East Richmond towards Flinders Street	Alamein line Peak only	Hawthorn towards Alamein, Belgrave or Lilydale
East Richmond towards Flinders Street	Glen Waverley line	Heyington towards Glen Waverley
Track layout
Location

Burnley station is a railway station operated by Metro Trains Melbourne on the Lilydale, Belgrave, Alamein and Glen Waverley lines, which are part of the Melbourne rail network. It serves the inner-eastern Melbourne suburb of the same name in Victoria, Australia, and opened on 1 May 1880.

Initially named Burnley Street, the station was given its current name on 1 September 1882. Train stabling facilities are located at the eastern (down) end of the station, adjacent to the Glen Waverley line, while an additional, track machine siding is located at the western (Up) end.

== History ==
Burnley is named after the former local landowner, William Burnley, a member of the Victorian Legislative Council for the district of North Bourke between 1853 and 1856.

In August 1943, as part of the Ashworth Improvement Plan, a flyover was constructed to the east of the station, to allow Glen Waverley line services to cross over the Hawthorn-bound line.

In 1963, the Madden Grove level crossing, located nearby in the down direction on the Glen Waverley line, was provided, replacing an earlier level crossing. In 1966, the signal box was rebuilt, the Burnley Street level crossing was grade-separated and the line towards Richmond expanded to quadruple track. In 1972, the third track to Hawthorn was commissioned. On 24 October 1997, the stabling facility was provided, as part of the closure and replacement of Jolimont Yard. As part of this facility, a crossover was provided at the up end of the level crossing.

On 19 December 2008, Burnley was upgraded to a premium station. On 30 November 2017, the signal box was abolished, with train control transferred to Metrol.

== Platforms, facilities and services ==
Burnley has two island platforms, connected by an accessible subway. The southern island platform (Platforms 1 and 2) includes a large building, which houses a customer service office, an enclosed waiting room, and toilets.

The station is served by Lilydale, Belgrave, Alamein and Glen Waverley line trains.

On weekdays, the majority of services on the Lilydale and Belgrave lines do not stop at Burnley, because they operate express to outer stations. Most services from Burnley only run as far as Blackburn or Ringwood.

Burnley platform arrangement
Platform	Line	Destination	Via	Service Type	Notes	Source
1	Glen Waverley line Lilydale line	Flinders Street		All stations		
2	Alamein line Belgrave line Lilydale line	Flinders Street	City Loop	All stations and limited express services	See City Loop for operating patterns	
3	Belgrave line Glen Waverley line Lilydale line	Glen Waverley, Lilydale or Belgrave		All stations	Services to Glen Waverley only operate from this platform during weekday peaks. Services to Belgrave and Lilydale only depart this platform on weekends.	
4	Alamein line Belgrave line Glen Waverley line Lilydale line	Glen Waverley, Alamein, Blackburn, Ringwood, Lilydale or Belgrave		All stations		

== Transport links ==
Yarra Trams operates one route via Burnley station:

- : Waterfront City Docklands – Wattle Park

Kinetic Melbourne operates one route via Burnley station, under contract to Public Transport Victoria:

- 603 : to Brighton Beach Station
