= Croydon railway station, Melbourne =

Railway station in Melbourne, Australia

Croydon
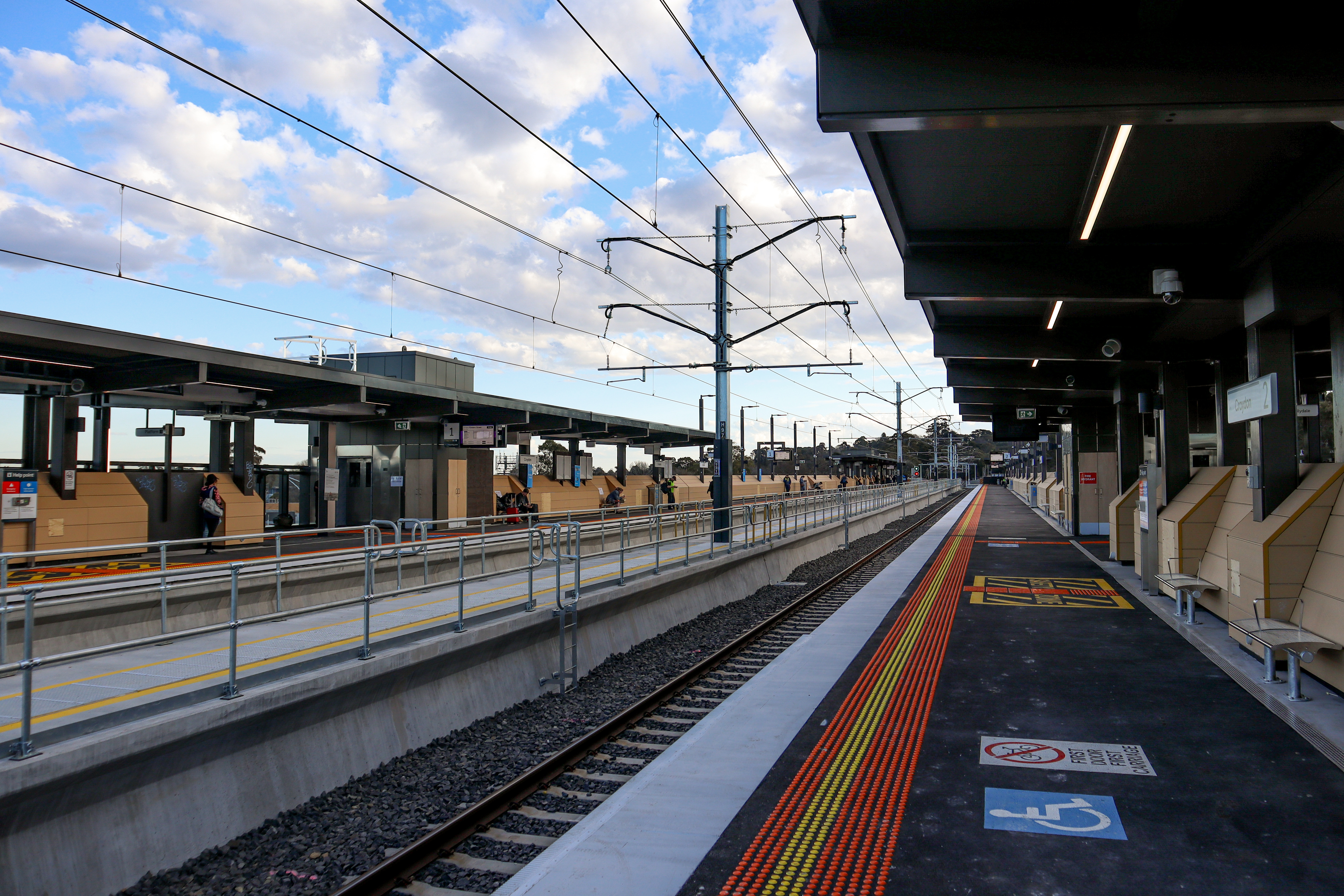
- North-east bound view from Platform 1, August 2024

General information
- Location: Wicklow Avenue, Croydon, Victoria 3136; City of Maroondah; Australia
- Coordinates: 37°47′43″S 145°16′50″E
- System: PTV commuter rail station
- Owner: VicTrack
- Operator: Metro Trains
- Line: Lilydale
- Distance: 31.03 kilometres from Southern Cross
- Platforms: 2 side
- Tracks: 2
- Connections: Bus

Construction
- Structure type: Elevated
- Parking: 578 (294 multi-level, 284 surface)
- Cycle facilities: 8
- Accessible: Yes, Lifts to both platforms

Other information
- Status: Operational, premium station
- Station code: CDN
- Fare zone: Myki zone 2
- Website: Public Transport Victoria

History
- Opened: 1 December 1882; 143 years ago
- Rebuilt: 30 June 1984; 12 August 2024 (LXRP)
- Electrified: November 1924 (1500 V DC overhead)
- Former names: Warrandyte (1882–1884)

Passengers
- 2005–2006: 694,405
- 2006–2007: 743,443 ▲7.06%
- 2007–2008: 851,017 ▲14.47%
- 2008–2009: 885,978 ▲4.1%
- 2009–2010: 880,996 ▼0.56%
- 2010–2011: 932,083 ▲5.79%
- 2011–2012: 885,015 ▼5.04%
- 2012–2013: Not measured
- 2013–2014: 821,534 ▼7.17%
- 2014–2015: 825,557 ▲0.48%
- 2015–2016: 901,997 ▲9.25%
- 2016–2017: 834,840 ▼7.44%
- 2017–2018: 899,751 ▲7.77%
- 2018–2019: 916,319 ▲1.84%
- 2019–2020: 726,050 ▼20.76%
- 2020–2021: 311,100 ▼57.15%
- 2021–2022: 327,150 ▲5.15%
- 2022–2023: 492,650 ▲50.58%
- 2023–2024: 288,100 ▼41.52%
- 2024–2025: 447,350 ▲55.28%

Services
Preceding station	Metro Trains	Following station
Ringwood East towards Flinders Street	Lilydale line	Mooroolbark towards Lilydale
Ringwood East towards Ringwood	Lilydale line Shuttle service	Mooroolbark towards Lilydale
Track layout
Location

Croydon station is a railway station operated by Metro Trains Melbourne on the Lilydale line, part of the Melbourne rail network. It serves the eastern Melbourne suburb of Croydon in Victoria, Australia. Croydon is an elevated premium station, featuring two side platforms. It opened on 1 December 1882, with the current station provided in August 2024.

Initially opened as Warrandyte, the station was given its current name of Croydon on 1 August 1884.

== History ==
Croydon station opened on 1 December 1882 as Warrandyte, when the railway line from Camberwell was extended to Lilydale. It was renamed Croydon on 1 August 1884, like the suburb itself, the station was named after Croydon in Surrey, England. The name was suggested by local landowner Gregory Lacey, whose wife was originally from Croydon. The station was built on parts of land owned by Lacey.

Electrification was completed from Ringwood to Croydon by November 1924, and from Croydon to Lilydale by November 1925. A since-removed level crossing in the down direction of the station was provided at Main Street, with automated wig-wag signals installed in June 1928.

In 1957, the line between Croydon and Mooroolbark was duplicated, with a number of sidings provided at the same time. In 1978, the goods yard was closed and, in that same year, a number of sidings were abolished.

In May 1979, the Main Street level crossing was closed to traffic and replaced with a since-removed level crossing at Coolstore Road, located in the down direction of the station and protected with automated boom gate barriers and flashing signals.

On 30 June 1984, the former ground level Platform 1 opened, as part of the duplication of the line between Croydon and Ringwood. The remaining sidings were also abolished during this time. On 31 July 1996, Croydon was upgraded to a premium station.

On 7 February 2019, Michael Sukkar announced on behalf of the Federal Government that $15 million would be spent to provide multistorey commuter car parking facilities at Croydon, as part of the controversial Urban Congestion Fund. Construction of the now-$20 million project located at Devon St was undertaken by Kane Constructions on behalf of Maroondah City Council. The building is designed to enable future conversion into transit-oriented development, and incorporates environmentally sustainable design initiatives including solar PV power generation and rainwater harvesting and re-use, achieving a 5-star NABERS rating. A total of 402 parking spaces opened on 15 December 2021. The ground floor of the facility provides 83 spaces of general 3-hour time-limited parking, 6 accessible parking spaces, 4 all-day motorcycle parking spaces, bicycle parking (4 outdoor hoops and an indoor cage), 4 electric vehicle charging spaces, and a 1,400 m^{2} (15,000 sq ft) single-storey commercial office space currently occupied by The Orange Door family and domestic violence support service. Level 1 and 2 of the facility provides a total of 294 all-day general car parking for commuters. This is in addition to surface commuter parking for 284 vehicles and 10 motorcycles in the station precinct, for a total of 578 commuter car parking spaces.

On 29 July 2021, the Level Crossing Removal Project announced that the Coolstore Road level crossing will be grade separated by 2025, with a 687 metre long rail bridge to be built over the road. The level crossing removal will also involve the construction of a new station. On 6 August 2022, early concept designs were released. In March 2023, construction on the project began.

On 30 January 2024, Croydon station closed temporarily to allow construction to take place, with the station buildings and Platform 2 demolished in the following days.

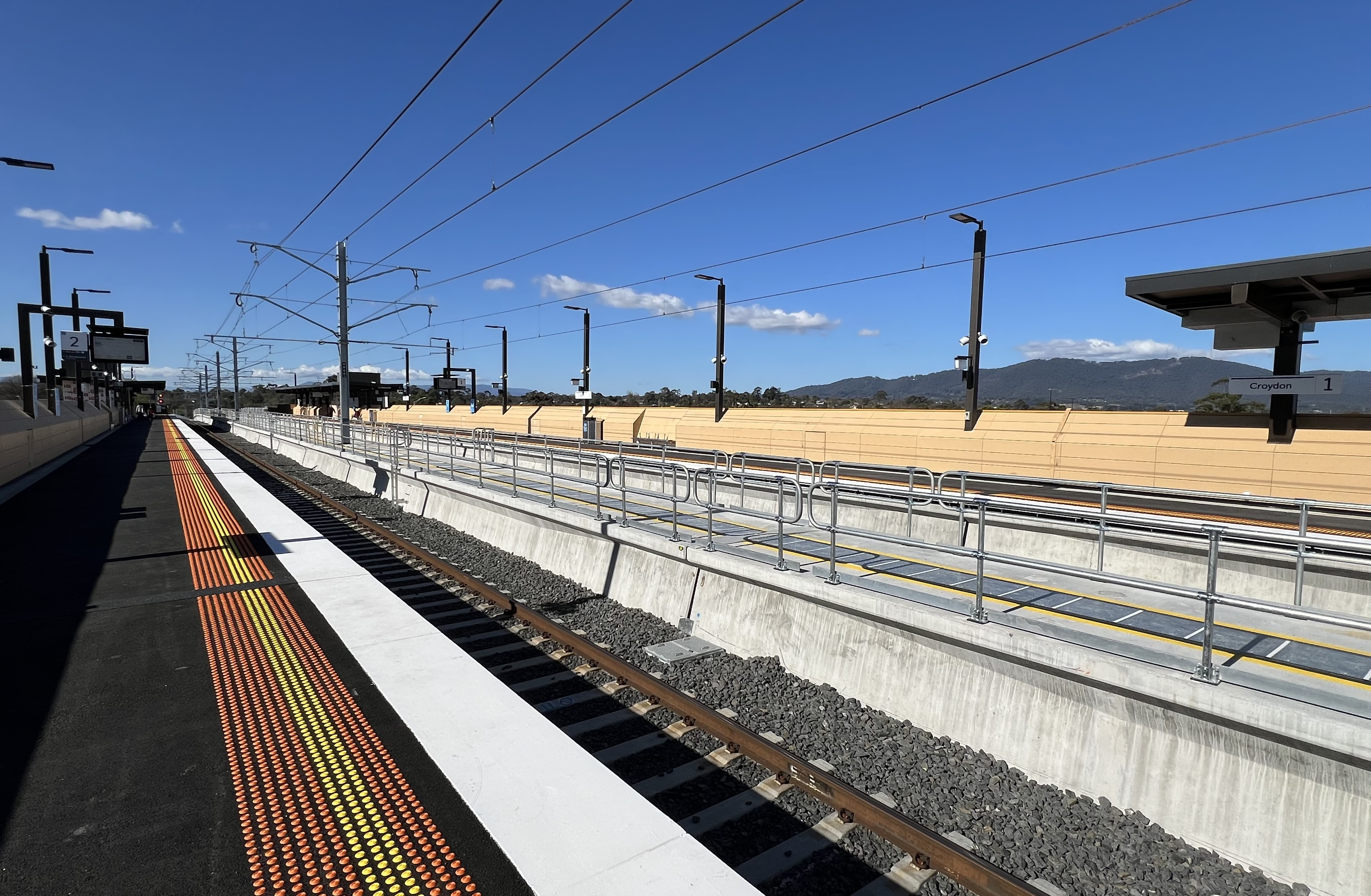
Overview of Croydon station, showing the Dandenong Ranges, August 2024

On 7 May 2024, Coolstore Road level crossing and equipment was eliminated, with a new Croydon station opening to passengers on 12 August 2024. The new station provides entrances at both the western and eastern ends, 4 lifts, stairs, public toilets, a waiting room, and 2 elevated side platforms. A total of 92 bicycle parking spaces are provided at the new station, including 33 open-air bicycle parking hoops and a Parkiteer bicycle parking cage. A new 14-bay bus interchange opened on 11 November 2024.

== Platforms and services ==
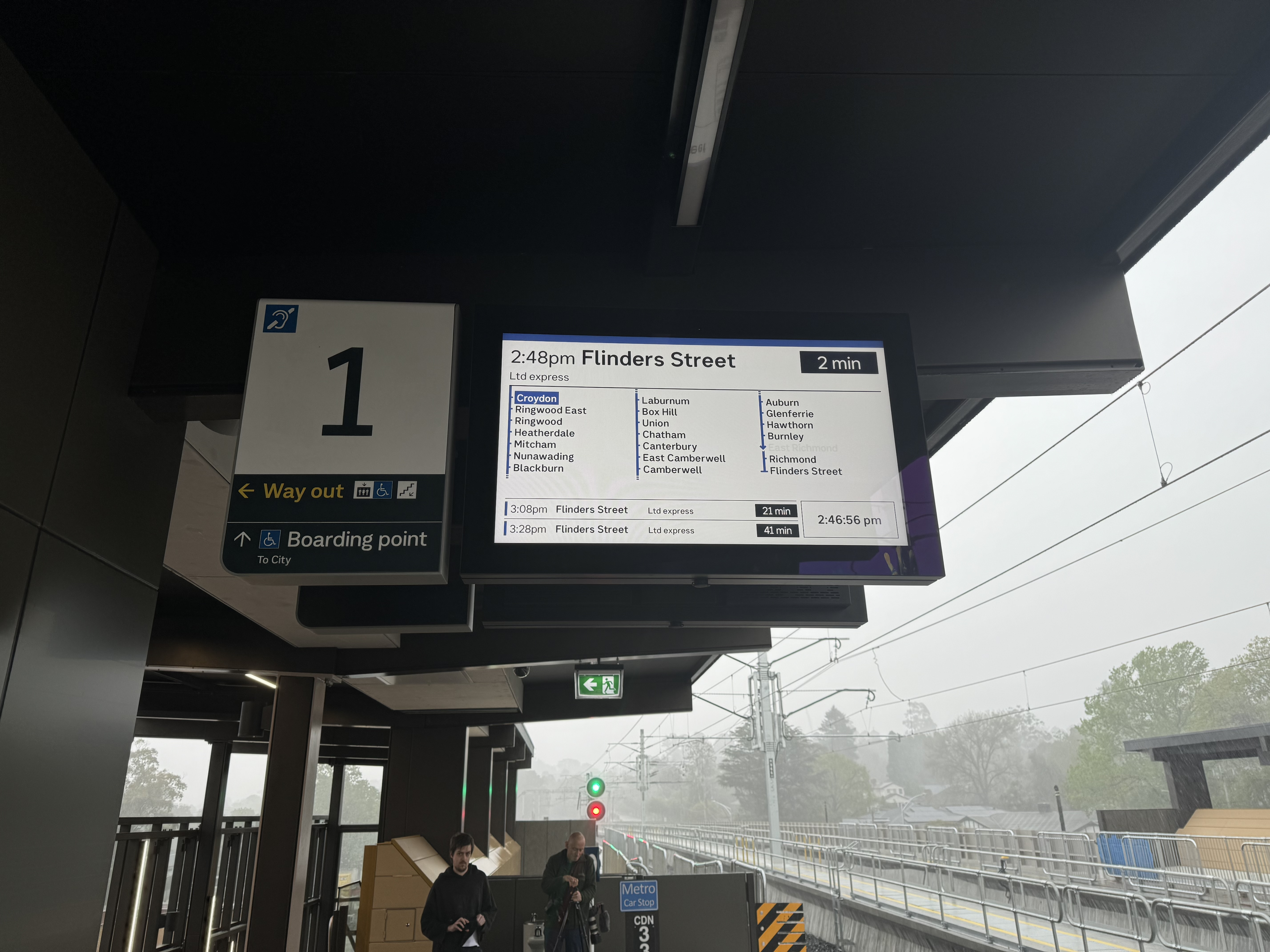
A PID on Platform 1 displaying a Flinders Street-bound service, October 2024

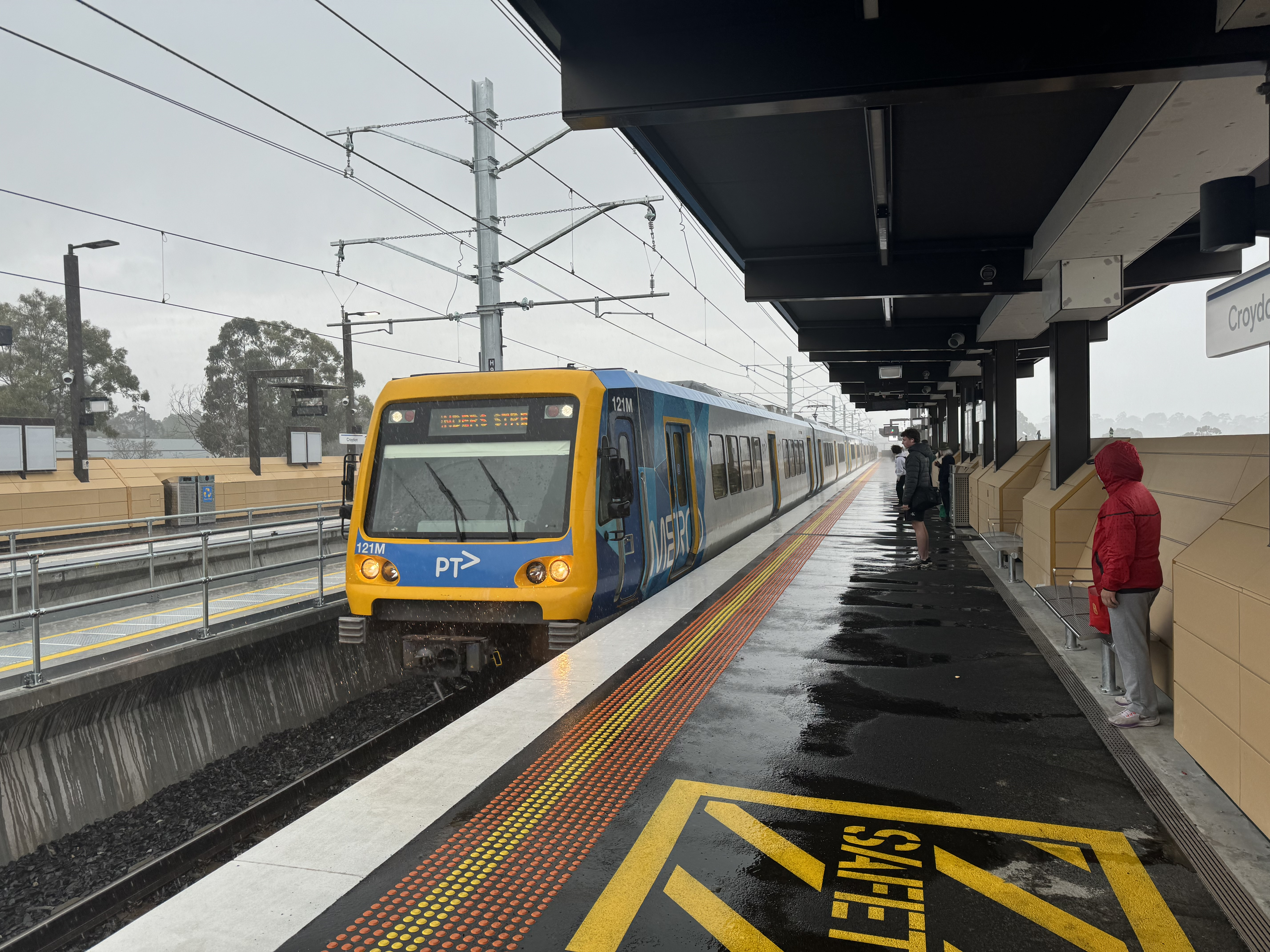
An X'Trapolis train on a Flinders Street-bound service arrives at Platform 1, October 2024

Croydon has two side platforms. It is serviced by Metro Trains' Lilydale line services.

Croydon platform arrangement
Platform	Line	Destination	Via	Service Type	Notes	Source
1	Lilydale line	Ringwood, Flinders Street	City Loop	All stations and limited express services	See City Loop for operating patterns	
2	Lilydale line	Mooroolbark, Lilydale		All stations		

== Transport links ==
Kinetic Melbourne operates Two bus route via Croydon station, under contract to Public Transport Victoria:

- 668 : to Ringwood station via Ringwood East Station
- 669 : to Ringwood station via Burnt Bridge Shopping Centre

Ventura Bus Lines operates ten routes via Croydon station, under contract to Public Transport Victoria:

- 664 : Chirnside Park Shopping Centre – Westfield Knox
- 670 : Ringwood station – Box Hill Institute Lilydale Lakeside Campus
- 671 : to Chirnside Park Shopping Centre
- 672 : to Chirnside Park Shopping Centre
- 688 : to Upper Ferntree Gully station
- 689 : to Montrose
- 690 : to Boronia station
- 737 : to Monash University Clayton Campus
- Night Bus 967 : to Glen Waverley station (Saturday and Sunday mornings only)
- FlexiRide Croydon

== Gallery ==
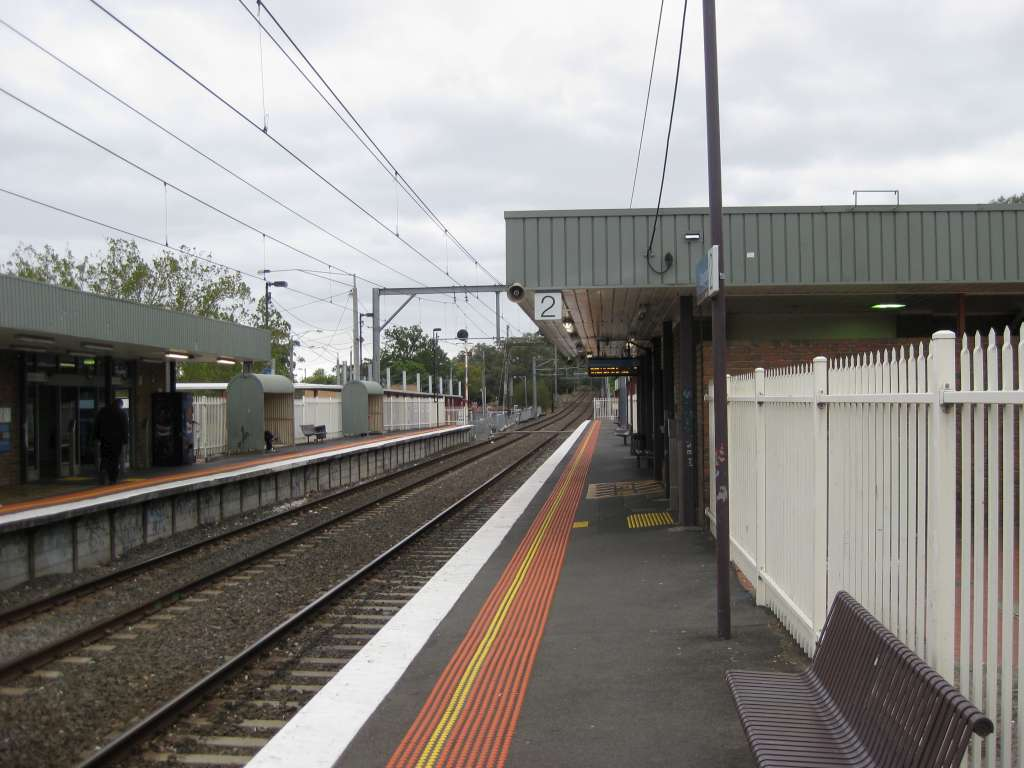
South-west bound view from the former ground level Platform 2, March 2009

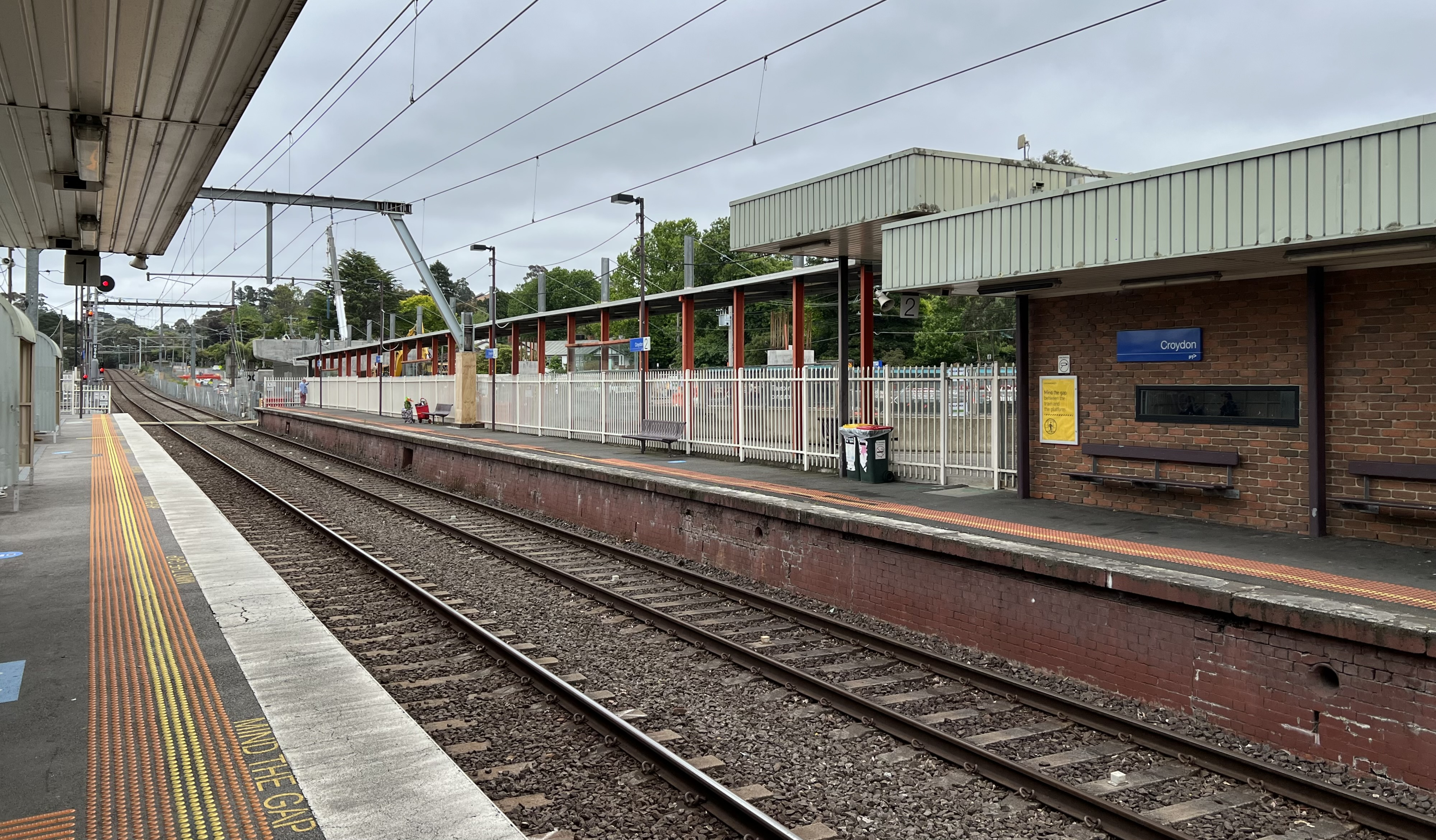
South-west bound view from the former ground level Platform 1, November 2023

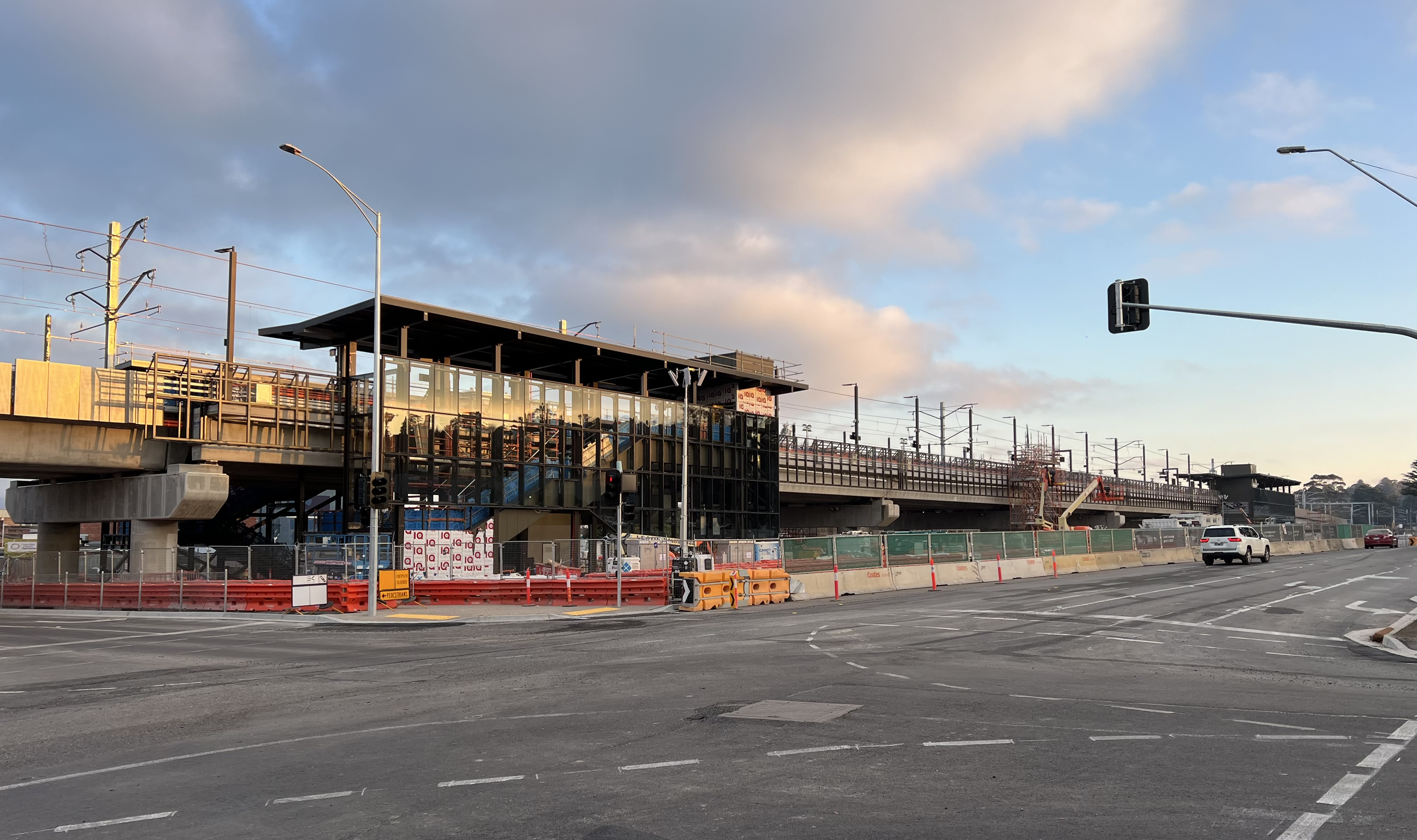
Elevated station under construction, July 2024

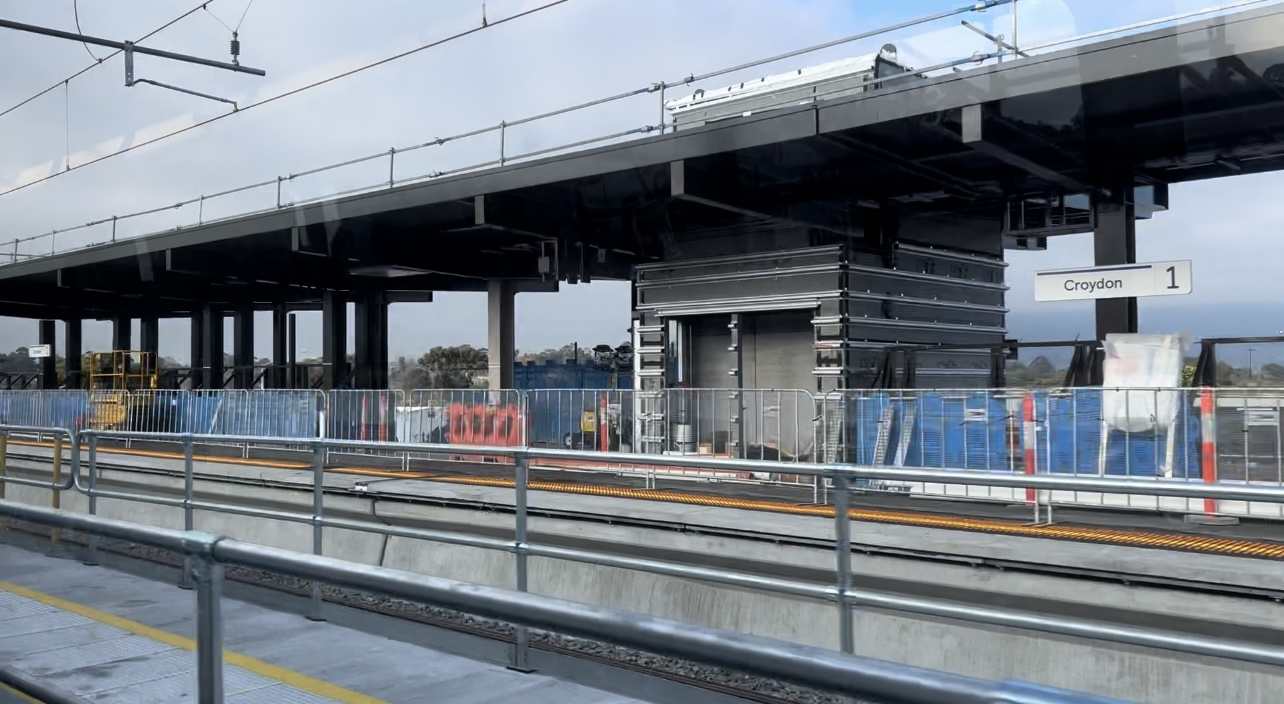
North-east view of Platform 1 under construction, July 2024

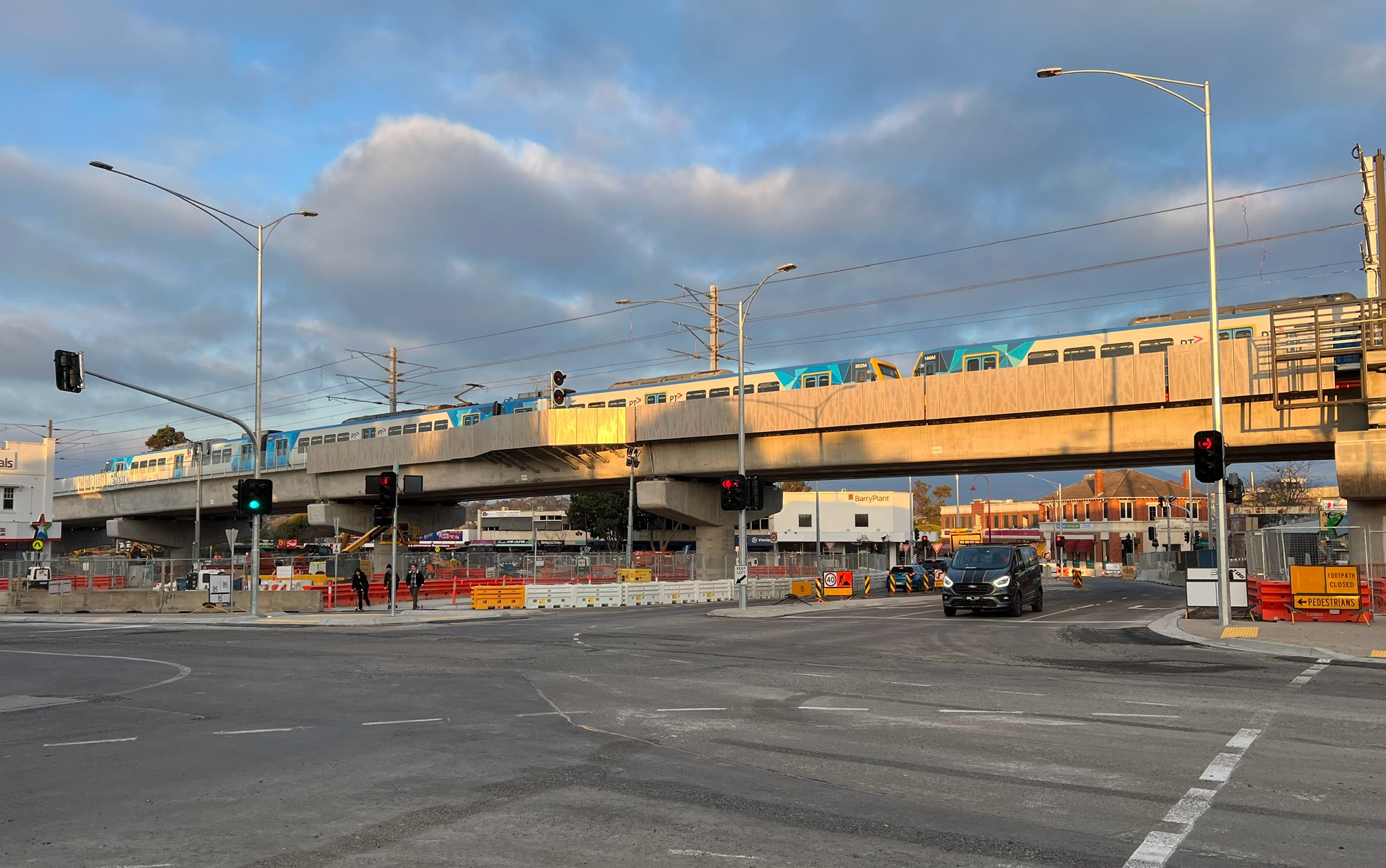
Coolstore Road after grade separation—North-east bound train over the Coolstore Road rail bridge, Croydon station, July 2024

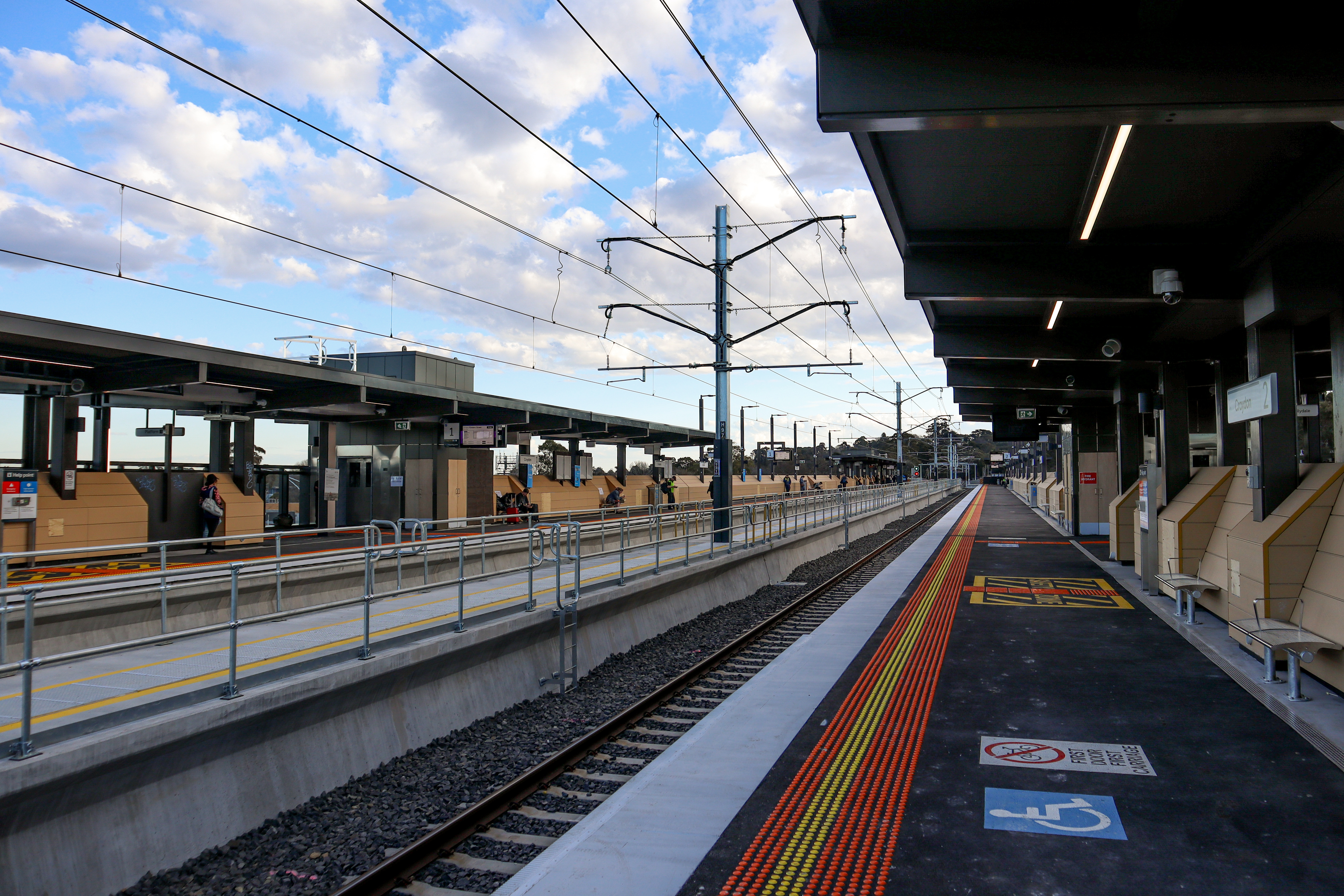
North-east bound view from Platform 1, August 2024

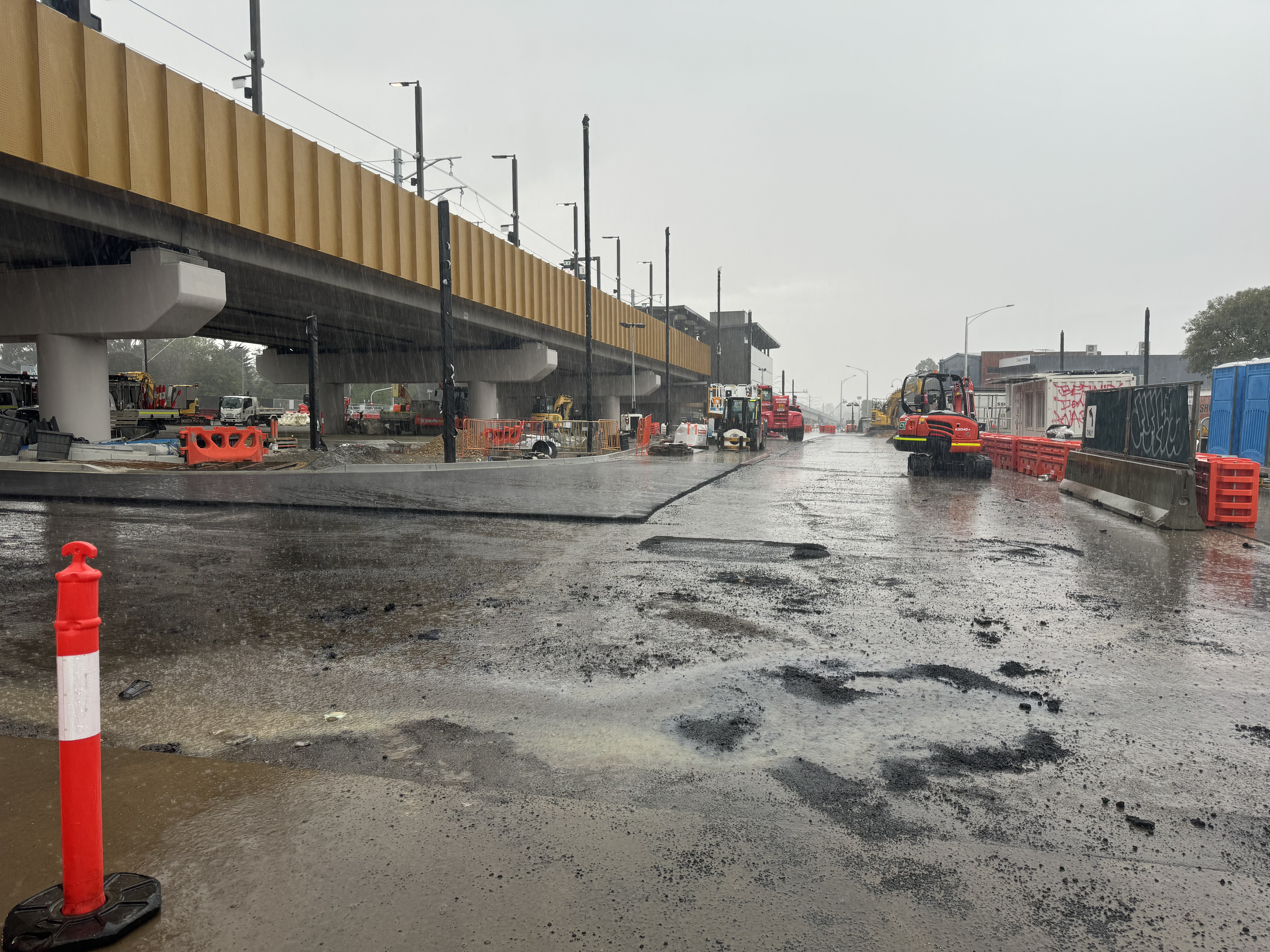
Eastbound view of the rail bridge on the south side, October 2024

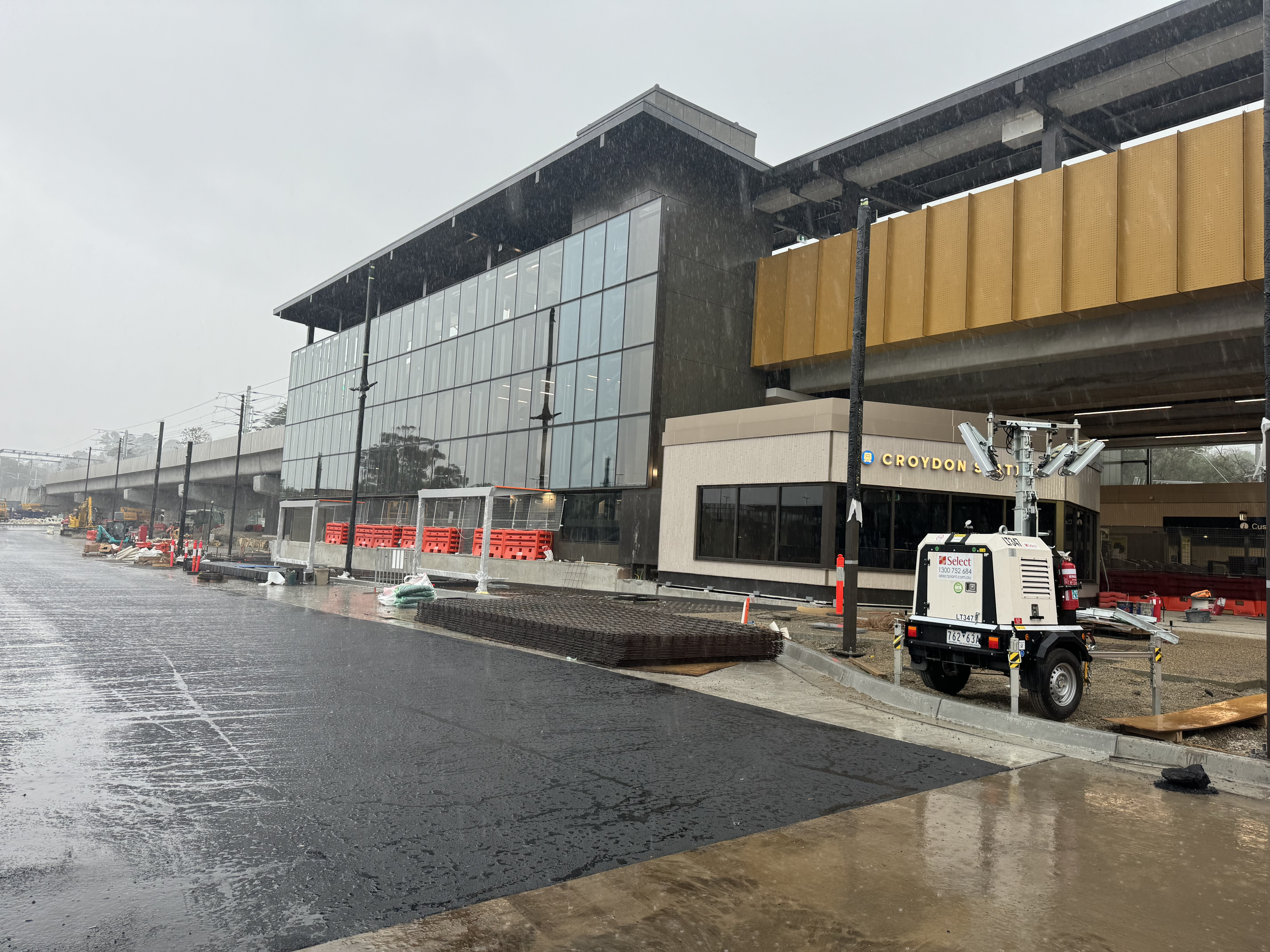
The western end station building, October 2024

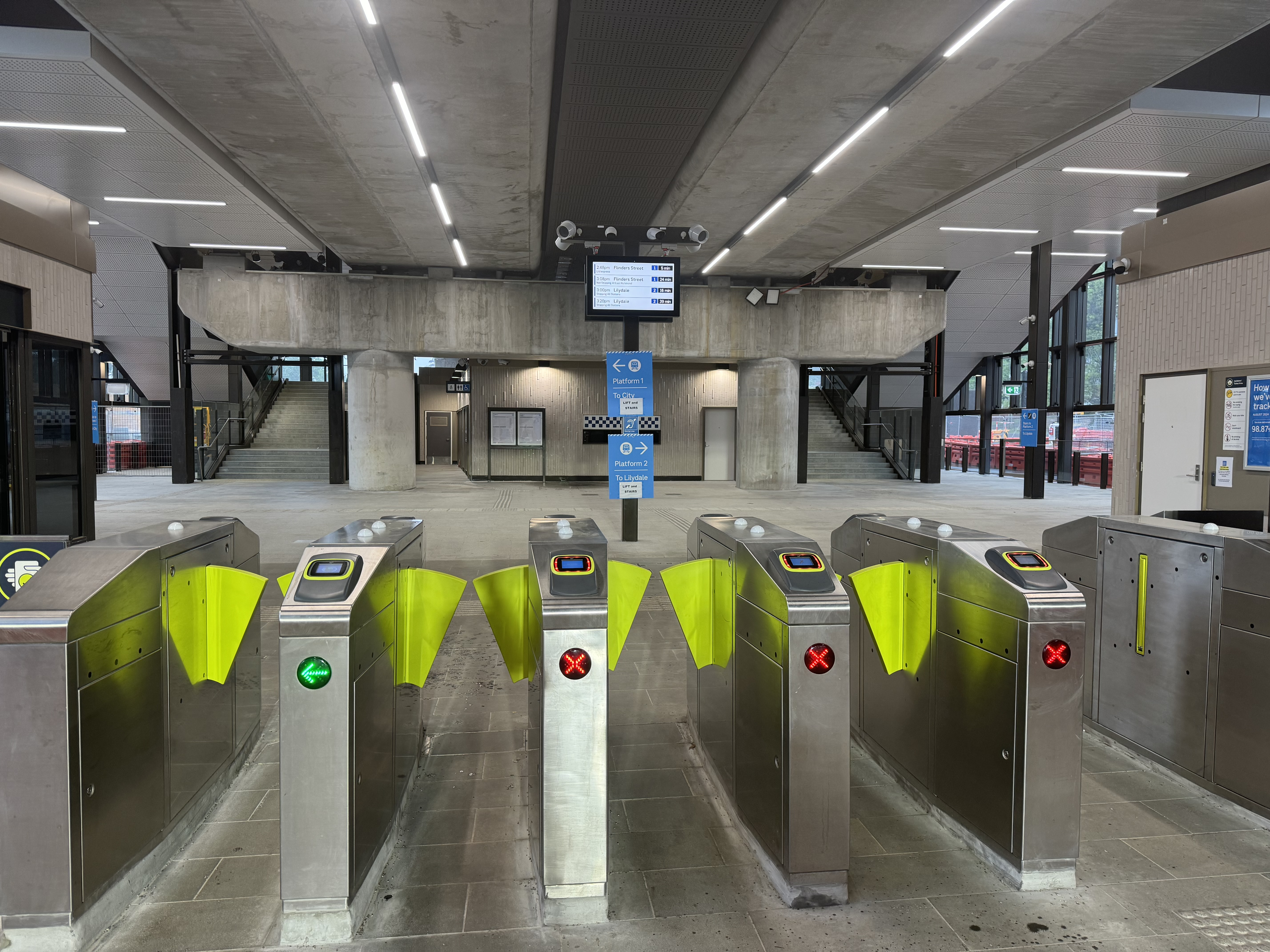
The western end concourse and Myki barriers, October 2024

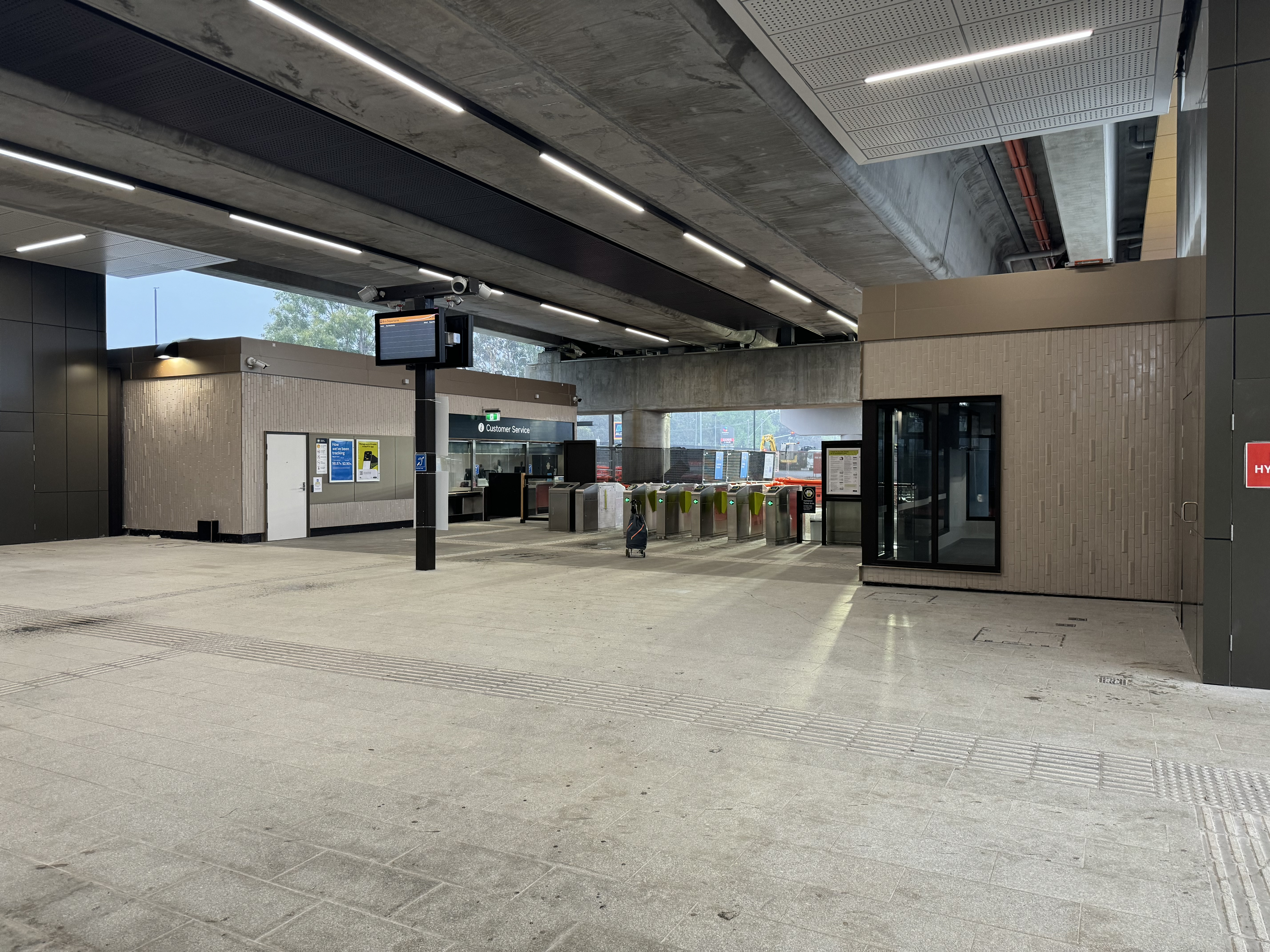
The western end station concourse, showing the station's waiting room and customer service, October 2024

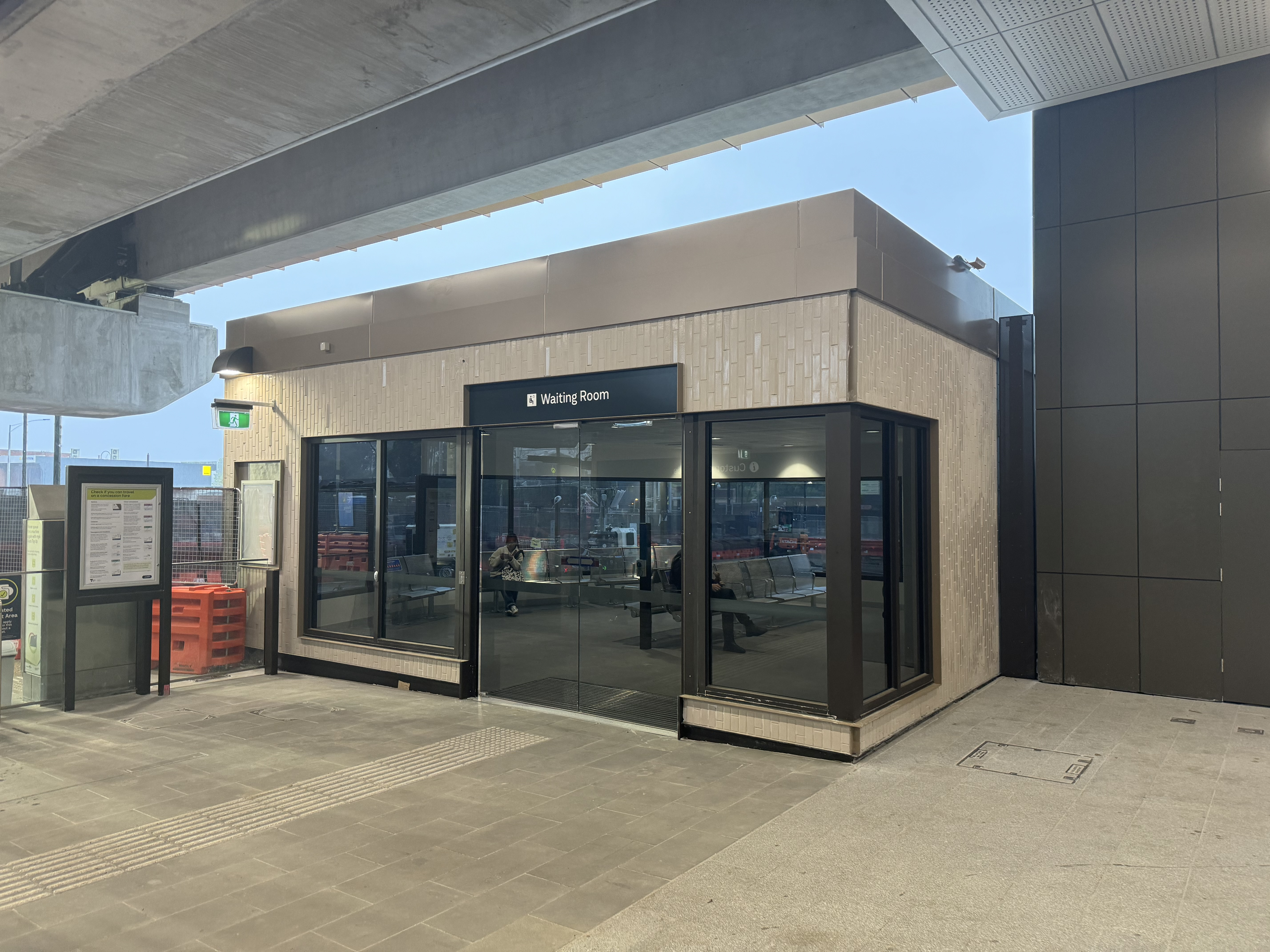
The station's waiting room at the western end concourse, October 2024

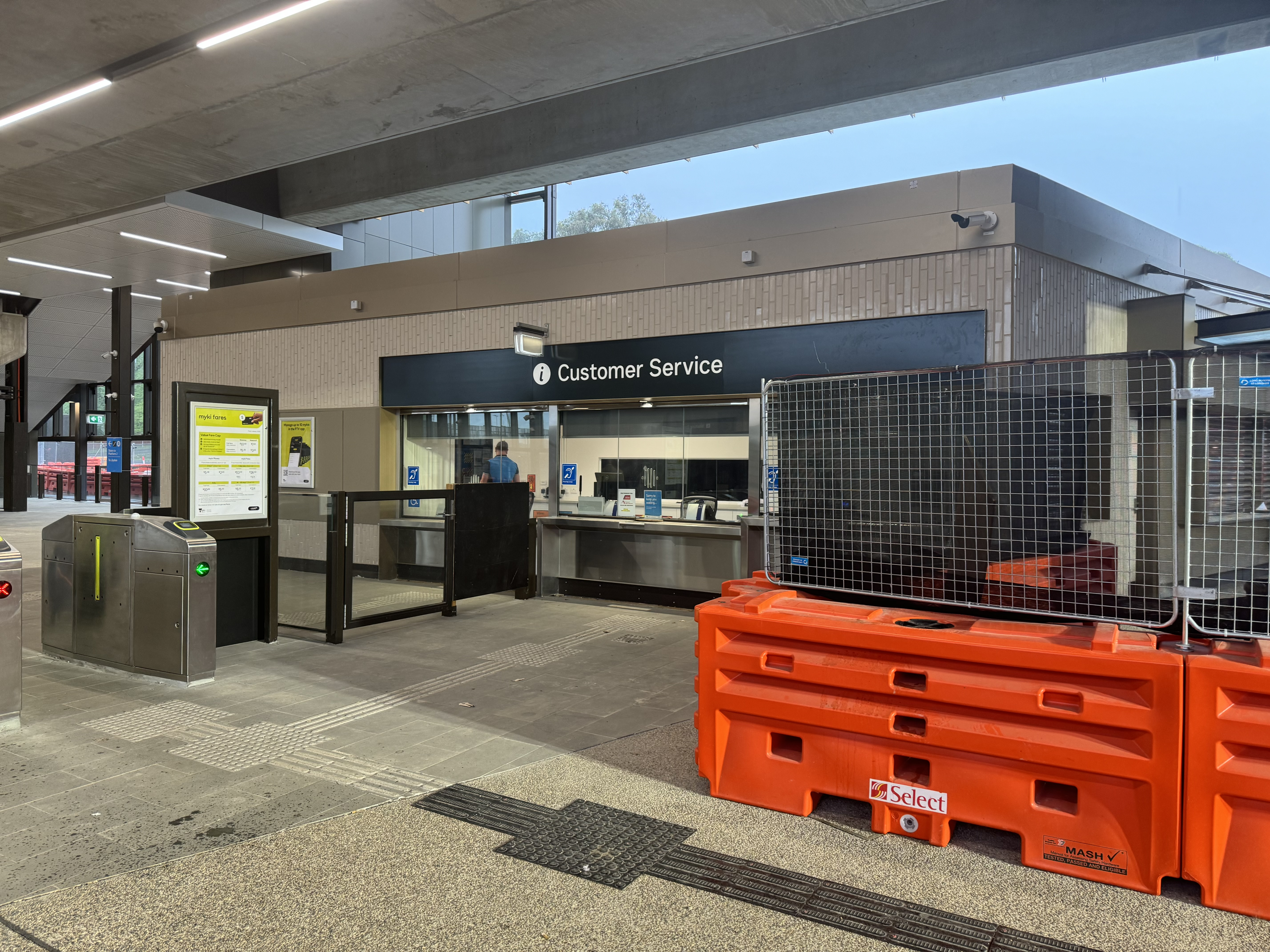
The station's customer service at the western end concourse, October 2024

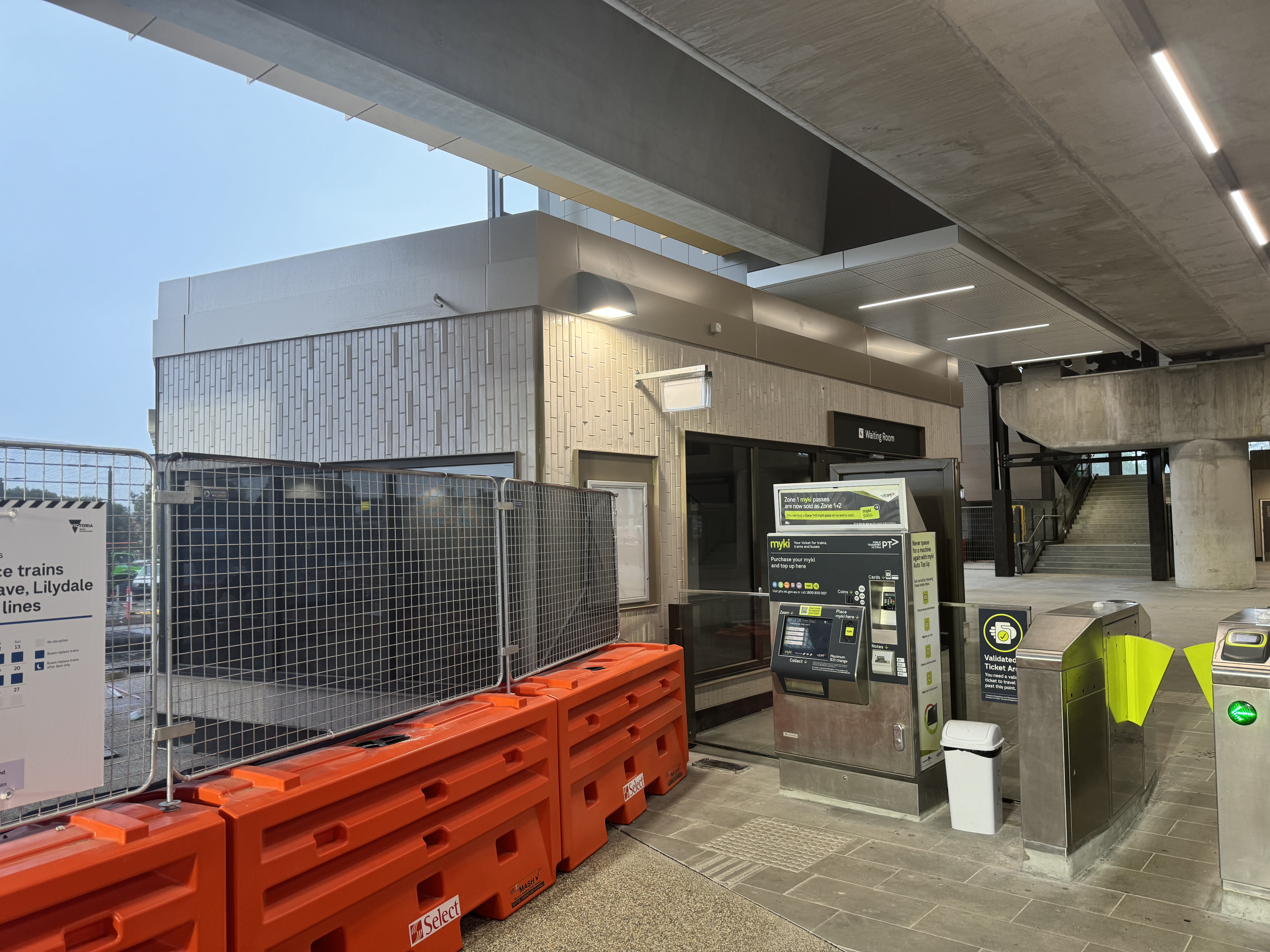
The western end waiting room and Myki barriers from the concourse, October 2024

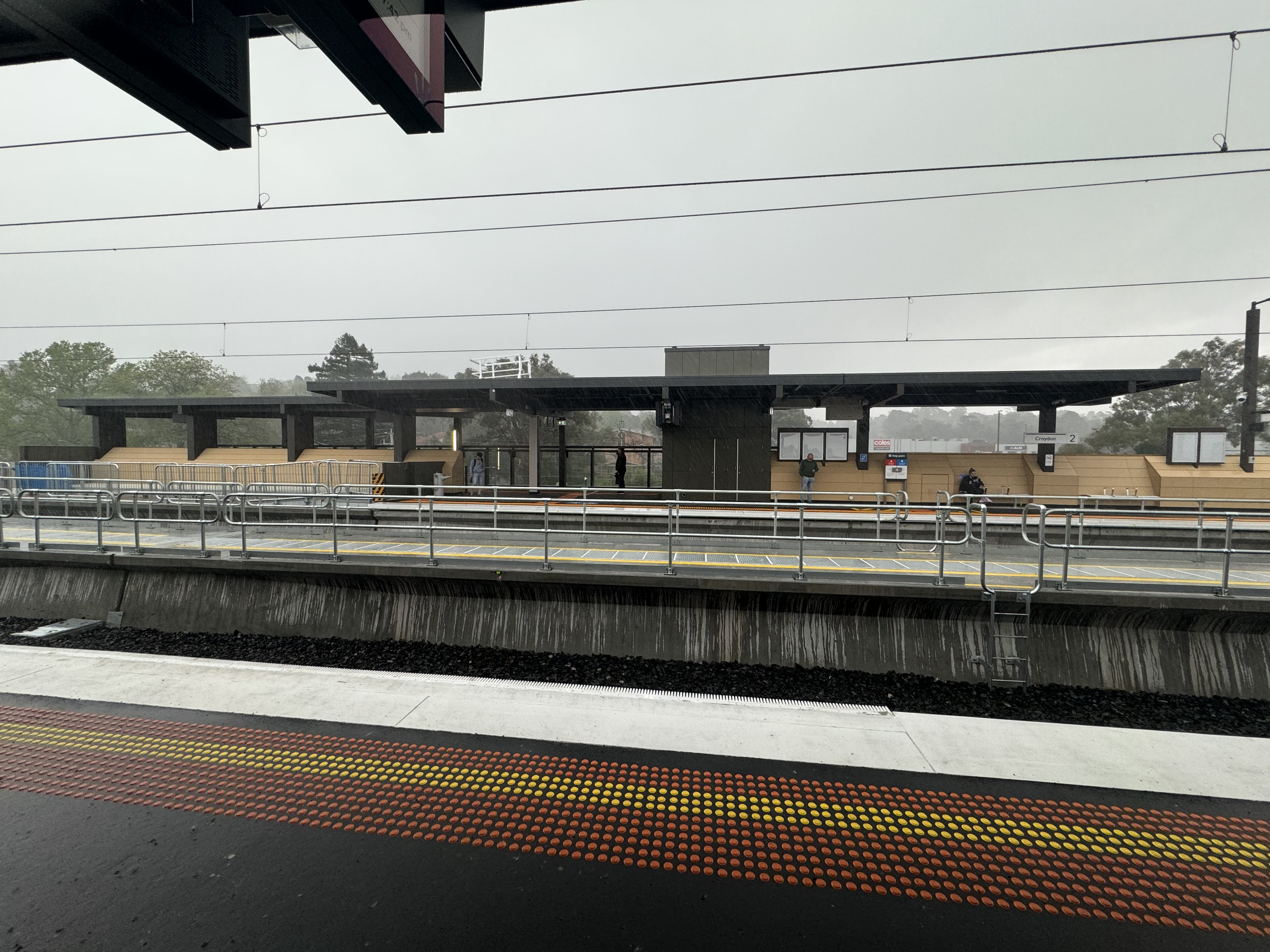
Western end shelter on Platform 2, October 2024

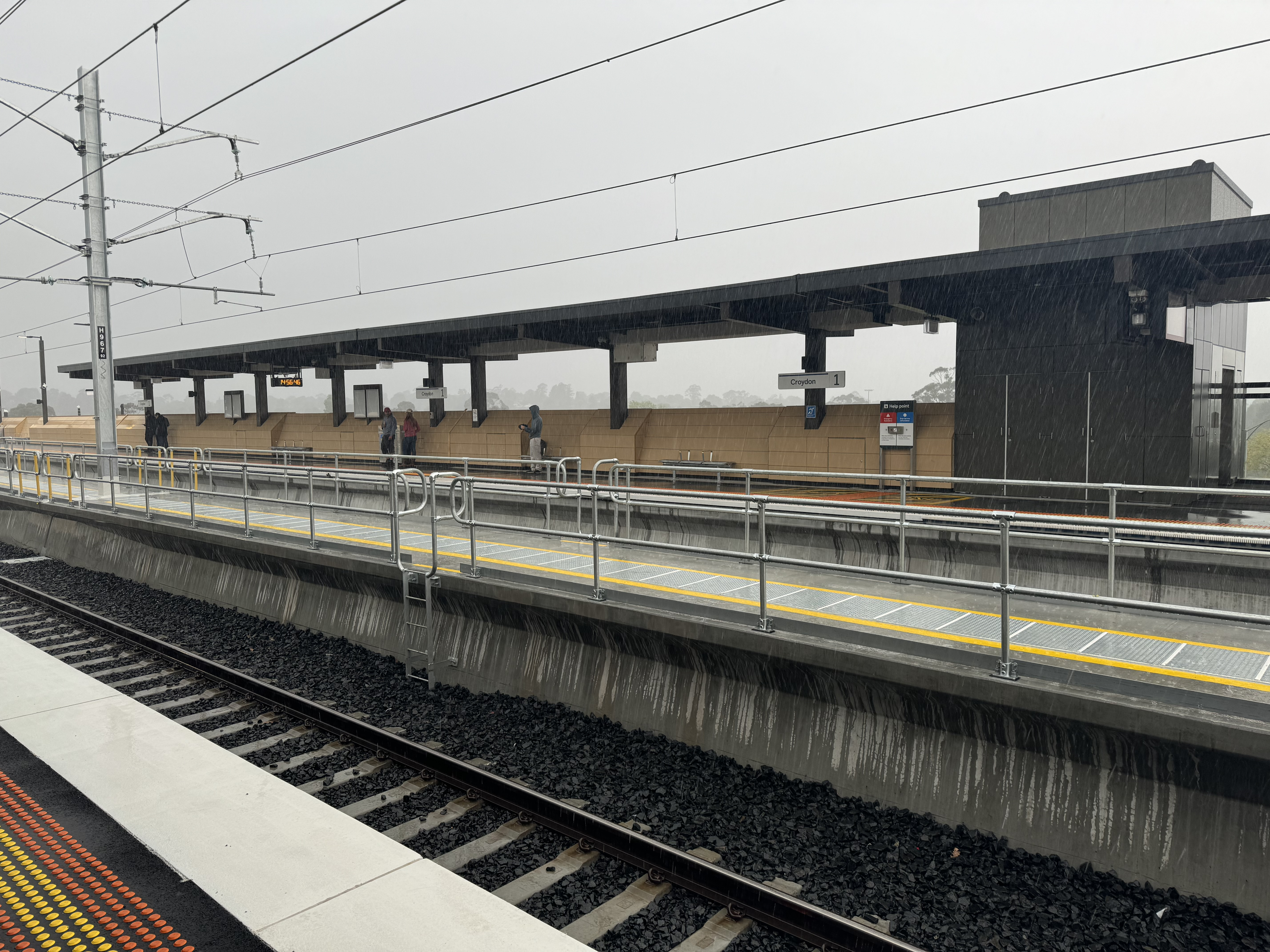
Western end shelter on Platform 1, October 2024

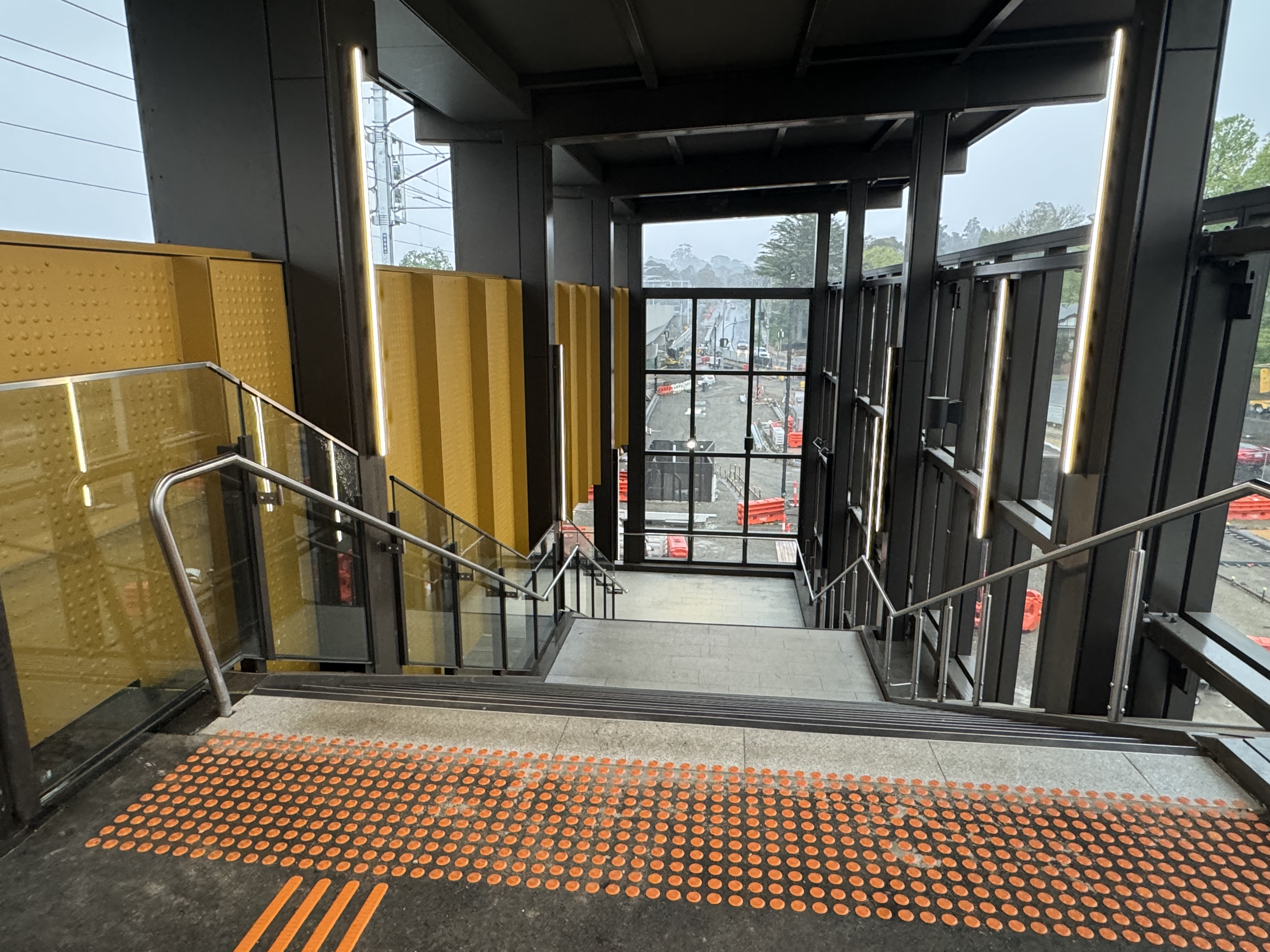
The stairs leading down to the western end concourse from Platform 2, October 2024

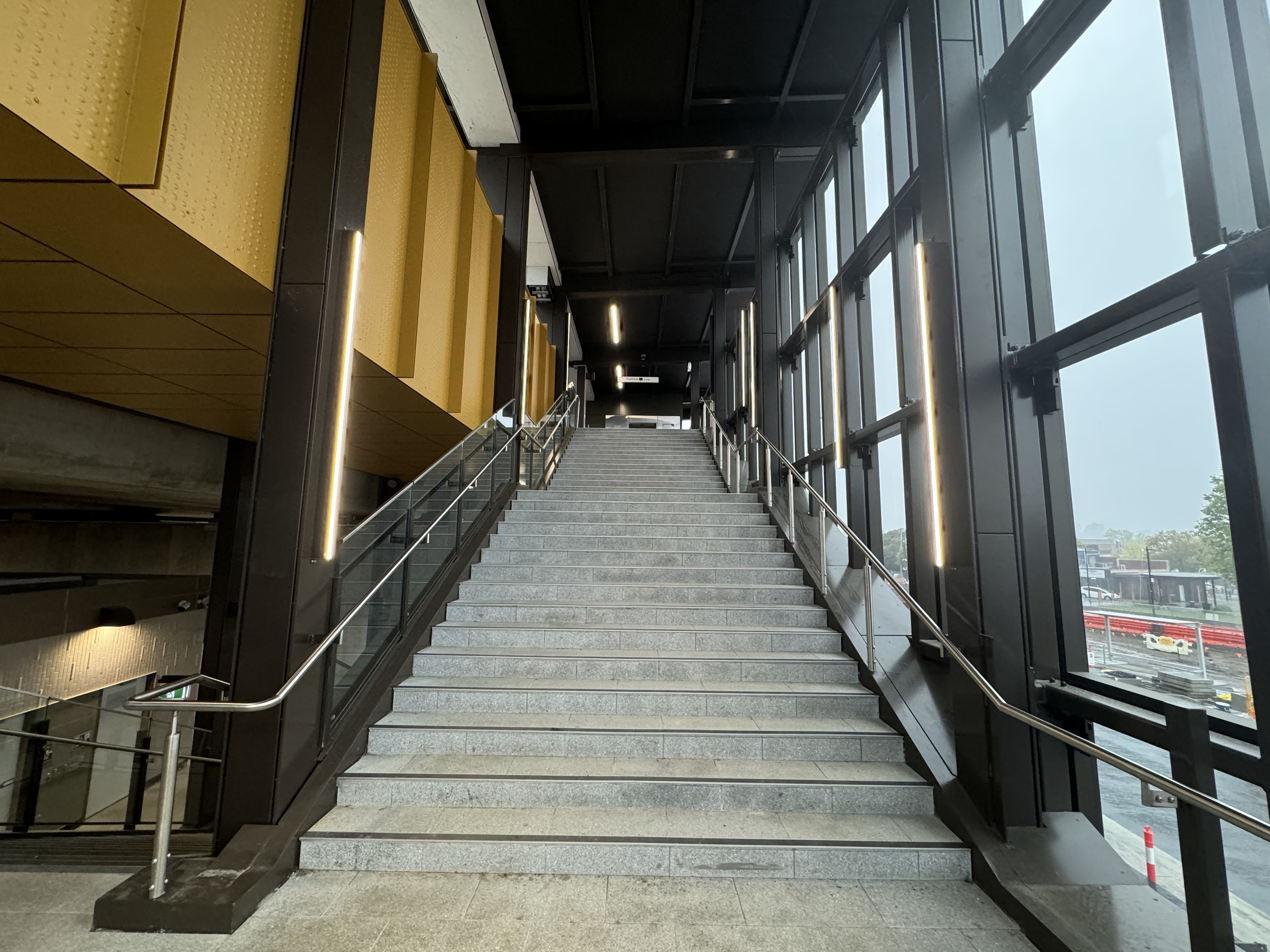
The stairs leading up to Platform 1 from the western end concourse, October 2024

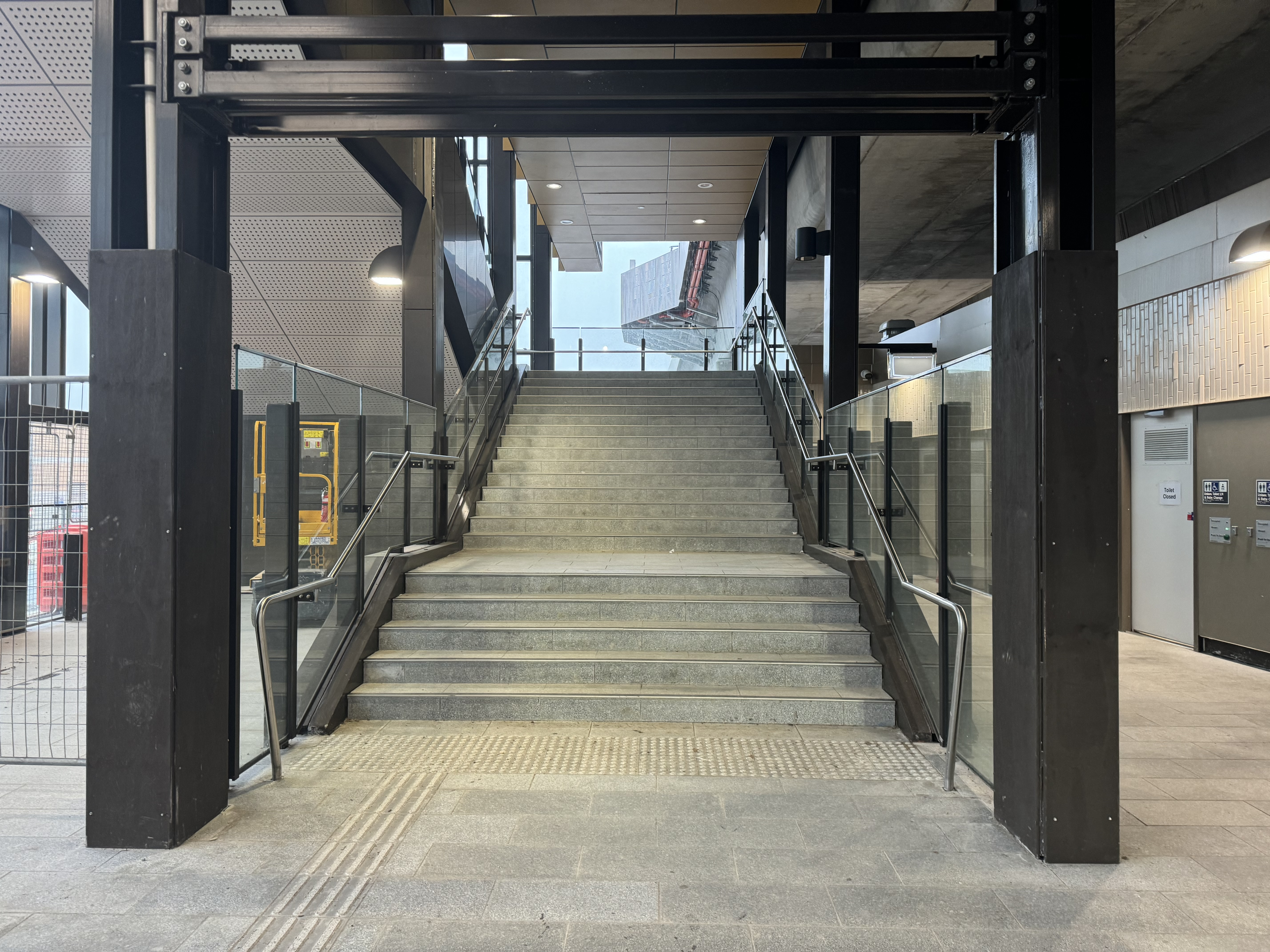
The stairs leading up to Platform 1 to mid level from the western end concourse, October 2024

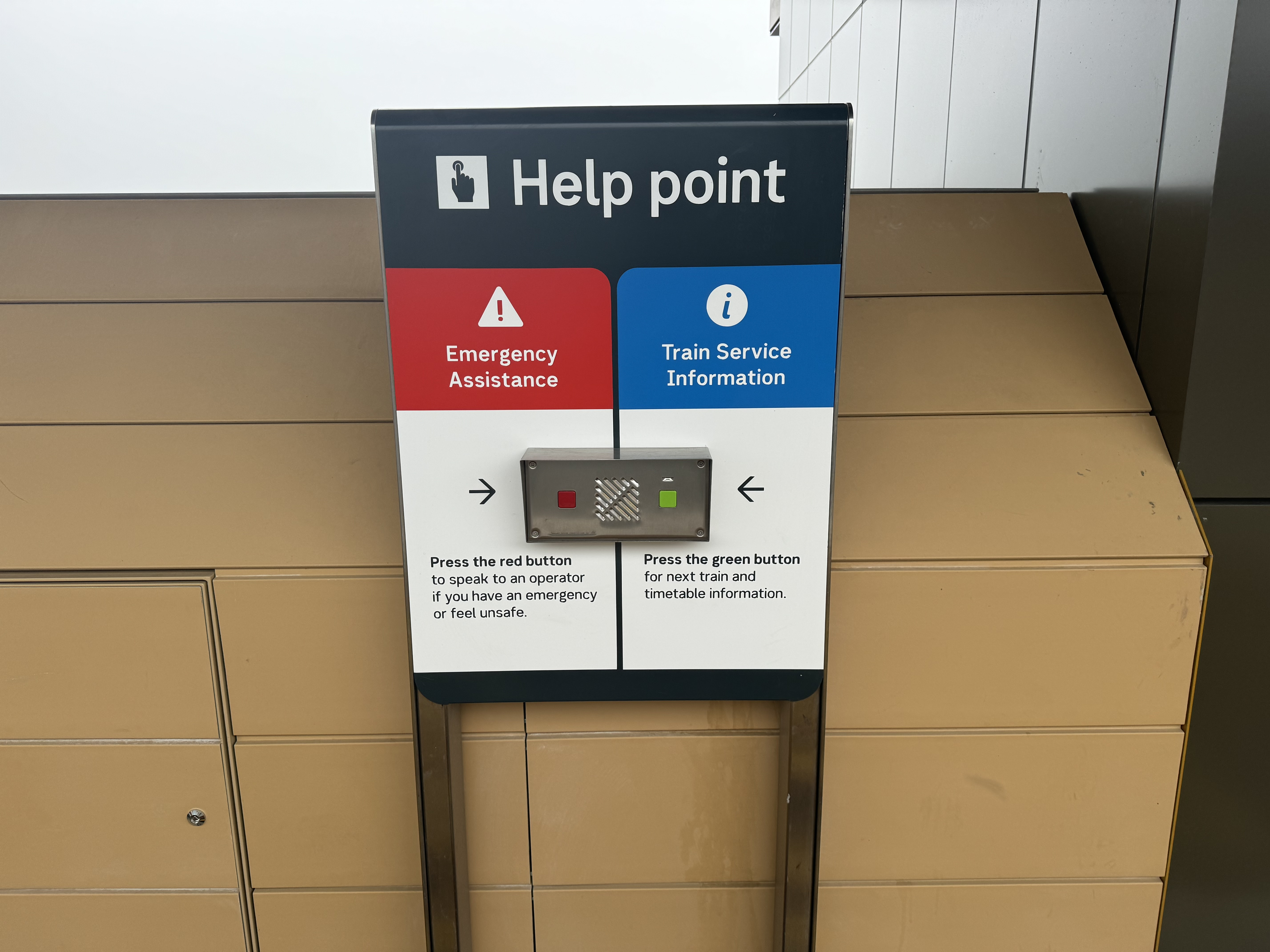
The help point on Platform 1, October 2024
