= Flexi =

Flexi may refer to:

- The flexi disc, a type of vinyl phonograph record
- The "Flexi truck", a type of Forklift truck
- Flexible-fuel vehicles
- FlexiRide, an on-demand bus service in Victoria, Australia
- Flexitarianism, a semi-vegetarian diet
- Flextime plans, a working arrangement with variable schedules
- Flexi was going to be the preliminary name of Tentro, a character from the Mixels franchise.
