= Mooroolbark railway station =

Railway station in Melbourne, Australia

Mooroolbark
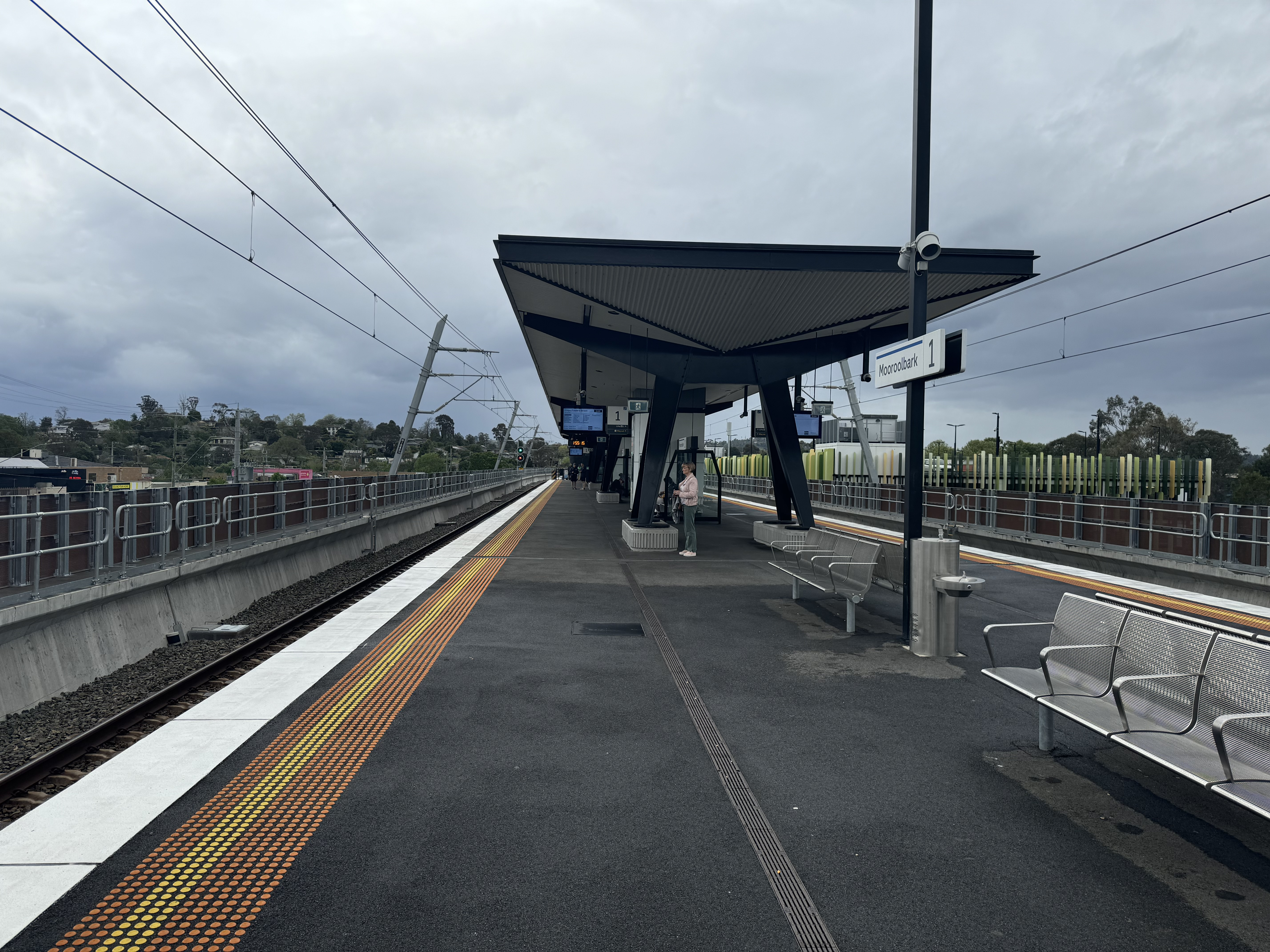
- Westbound view from Platform 1, October 2024

General information
- Location: Brice Avenue, Mooroolbark, Victoria 3138; Shire of Yarra Ranges; Australia
- Coordinates: 37°47′05″S 145°18′45″E
- System: PTV commuter rail station
- Owner: VicTrack
- Operator: Metro Trains
- Line: Lilydale
- Distance: 34.38 kilometres from Southern Cross
- Platforms: 2 (1 island)
- Tracks: 2
- Connections: Bus

Construction
- Structure type: Elevated
- Parking: 900 (20 accessible bays)
- Cycle facilities: 8
- Accessible: Yes — step free access

Other information
- Status: Operational, premium station
- Station code: MLK
- Fare zone: Myki zone 2
- Website: Public Transport Victoria

History
- Opened: 10 October 1887; 138 years ago
- Rebuilt: 1985; 19 November 2021 (LXRP)
- Electrified: November 1925 (1500 V DC overhead)

Passengers
- 2005–2006: 554,752
- 2006–2007: 591,674 ▲6.65%
- 2007–2008: 669,163 ▲13.09%
- 2008–2009: 793,851 ▲18.63%
- 2009–2010: 794,160 ▲0.03%
- 2010–2011: 797,232 ▲0.38%
- 2011–2012: 733,013 ▼8.05%
- 2012–2013: Not measured
- 2013–2014: 644,788 ▼12.03%
- 2014–2015: 639,963 ▼0.74%
- 2015–2016: 688,811 ▲7.63%
- 2016–2017: 652,036 ▼5.33%
- 2017–2018: 707,345 ▲8.48%
- 2018–2019: 722,154 ▲2.09%
- 2019–2020: 568,300 ▼21.3%
- 2020–2021: 197,000 ▼65.33%
- 2021–2022: 213,050 ▲8.14%
- 2022–2023: 405,950 ▲90.54%
- 2023–2024: 465,850 ▲14.76%
- 2024–2025: 569,250 ▲22.2%

Services
Preceding station	Metro Trains	Following station
Croydon towards Flinders Street	Lilydale line	Lilydale Terminus
Croydon towards Ringwood	Lilydale line Shuttle service	Lilydale Terminus
Track layout
Location

Mooroolbark station is a railway station operated by Metro Trains Melbourne on the Lilydale line, part of the Melbourne rail network. It serves the eastern Melbourne suburb of Mooroolbark in Victoria, Australia. Mooroolbark is an elevated premium station, featuring an island platform with two faces. It opened on 10 October 1887 with the current station provided in November 2021.

The current rail-over-road Mooroolbark station structure was opened on 19 November 2021, as part of railway redevelopment works, including the Level Crossing Removal Project. A crossover is located at the up end of the station, which allows services to terminate and return. Mooroolbark also marks the end of the double track on the Lilydale line.

== History ==
Mooroolbark station opened on 10 October 1887 and, like the suburb itself, is named after an Indigenous word meaning 'red earth'. The name came from a cattle run that was leased to John Gardiner, with the land stretching from Brushy Creek to Olinda.

In 1949, flashing light signals were provided at the former Manchester Road level crossing, which was located at the up end of the station.

In 1981, a number of sidings at the station were abolished. In 1983, boom barriers were provided at the level crossing. In 1985, the former ground-level Platform 2 was provided, along with new track which allowed down trains to enter the platform. This was in conjunction with the provision of automatic signalling between Mooroolbark and Lilydale.

In June 2001, Mooroolbark was upgraded to a premium station.

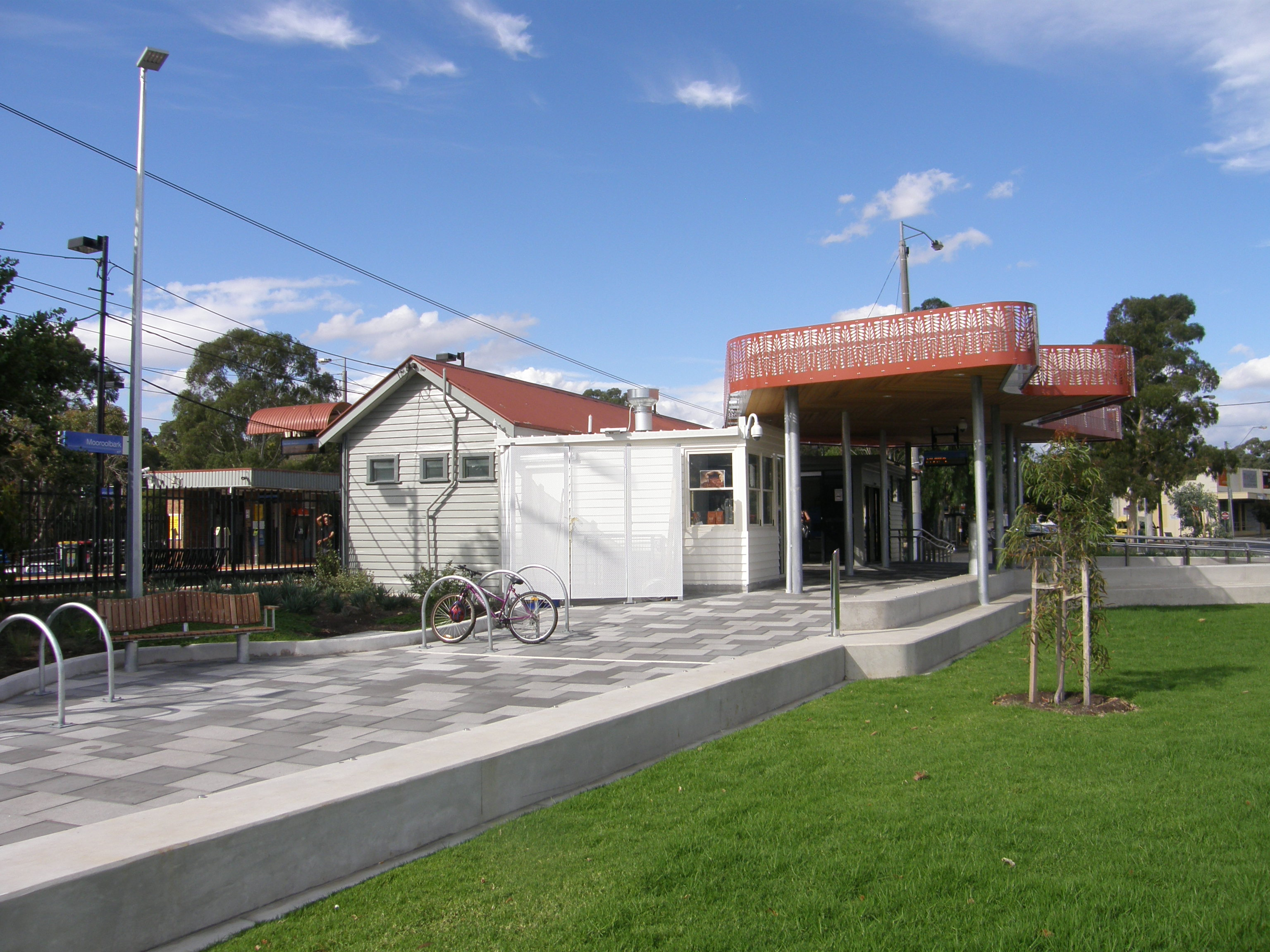
Former ground level station forecourt, following a 2014 upgrade, building and Platform 1 entrance, March 2015

In October 2013, three small shelters were provided at the ends of both former ground level platforms. Platform 1 had shelters at each end, while Platform 2 had one at the down (Lilydale) end. Both platforms also had a raised section installed, reducing the need for a wheelchair ramp to be used.

In 2015, the Level Crossing Removal Project announced the removal of the Manchester Road level crossing. In 2020, work commenced on the project, with a rail-over-road configuration. The project was scheduled to be completed by 2022, however, on 19 November 2021, the rebuilt station opened to passengers.

The original 1887 station building, removed as part of the level crossing removal works, was relocated to the Lilydale campus of Box Hill Institute for restoration. It is scheduled to be moved to Tarrawarra, on the Yarra Valley Railway.

== Platforms and services ==
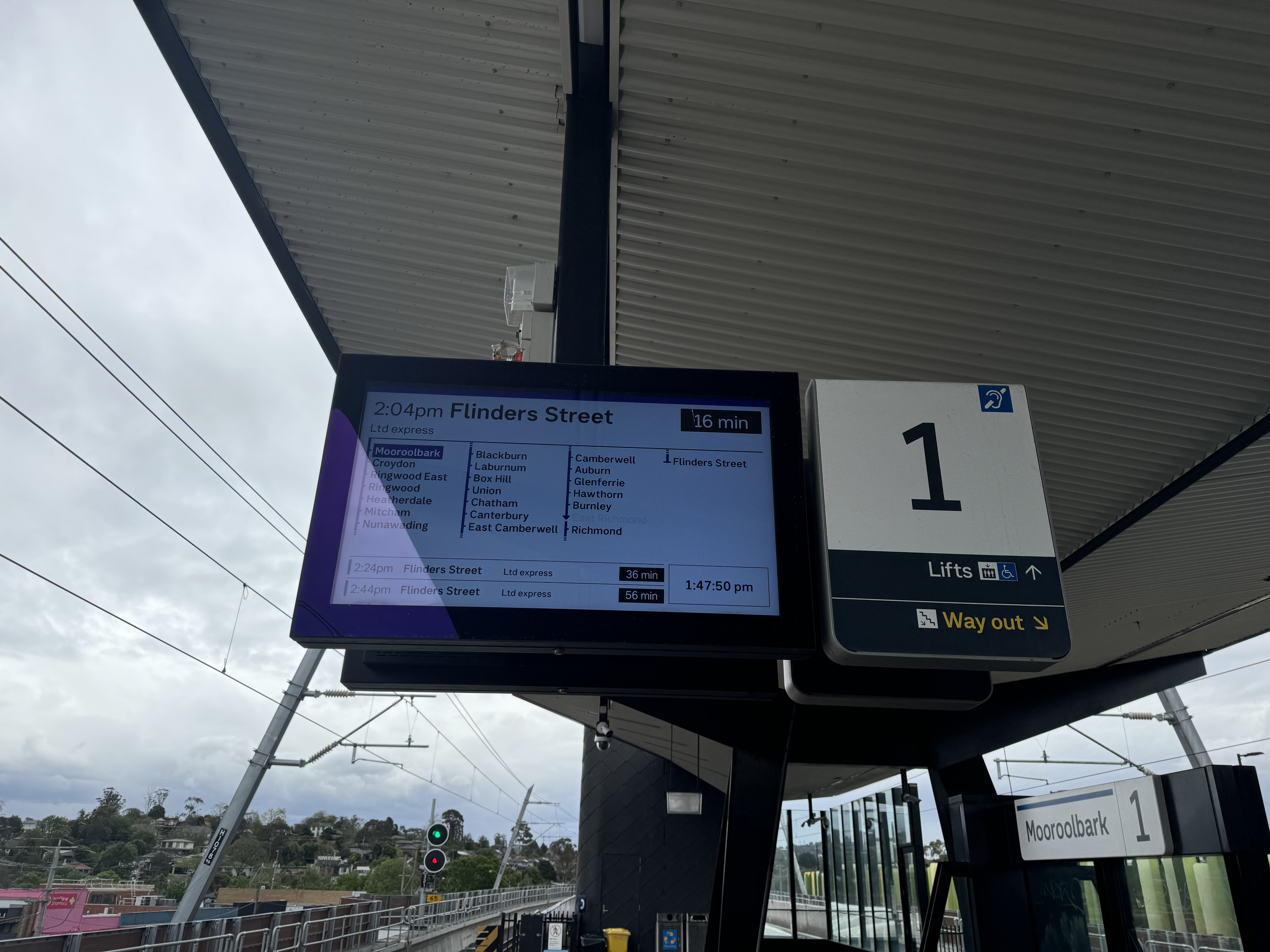
A PID on Platform 1 displaying a Flinders Street-bound service, October 2024

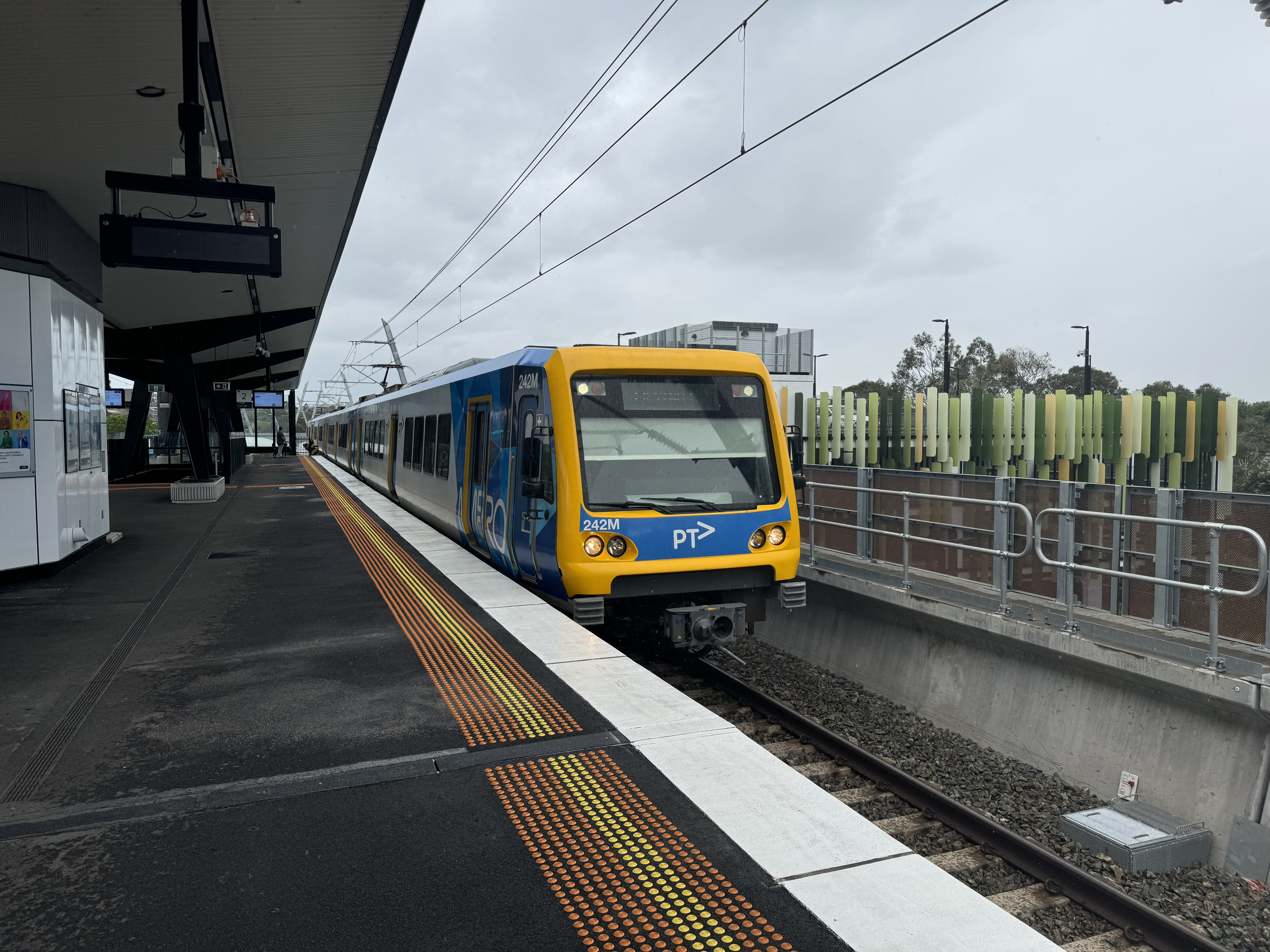
An X'Trapolis train on a Lilydale-bound service arrives at Platform 2, October 2024

Mooroolbark has one island platform with two faces. It is served by Lilydale line trains.

Mooroolbark platform arrangement
Platform	Line	Destination	Via	Service Type	Notes	Source
1	Lilydale line	Ringwood, Flinders Street	City Loop	All stations and limited express services	See City Loop for operating patterns	
2	Lilydale line	Lilydale		All stations		

== Transport links ==
Ventura Bus Lines operates four routes via Mooroolbark station, under contract to Public Transport Victoria:

- 675 : to Chirnside Park Shopping Centre
- 680 : to Lilydale station
- FlexiRide Croydon
- FlexiRide Mooroolbark
