= Telebus =

Demand-responsive bus service

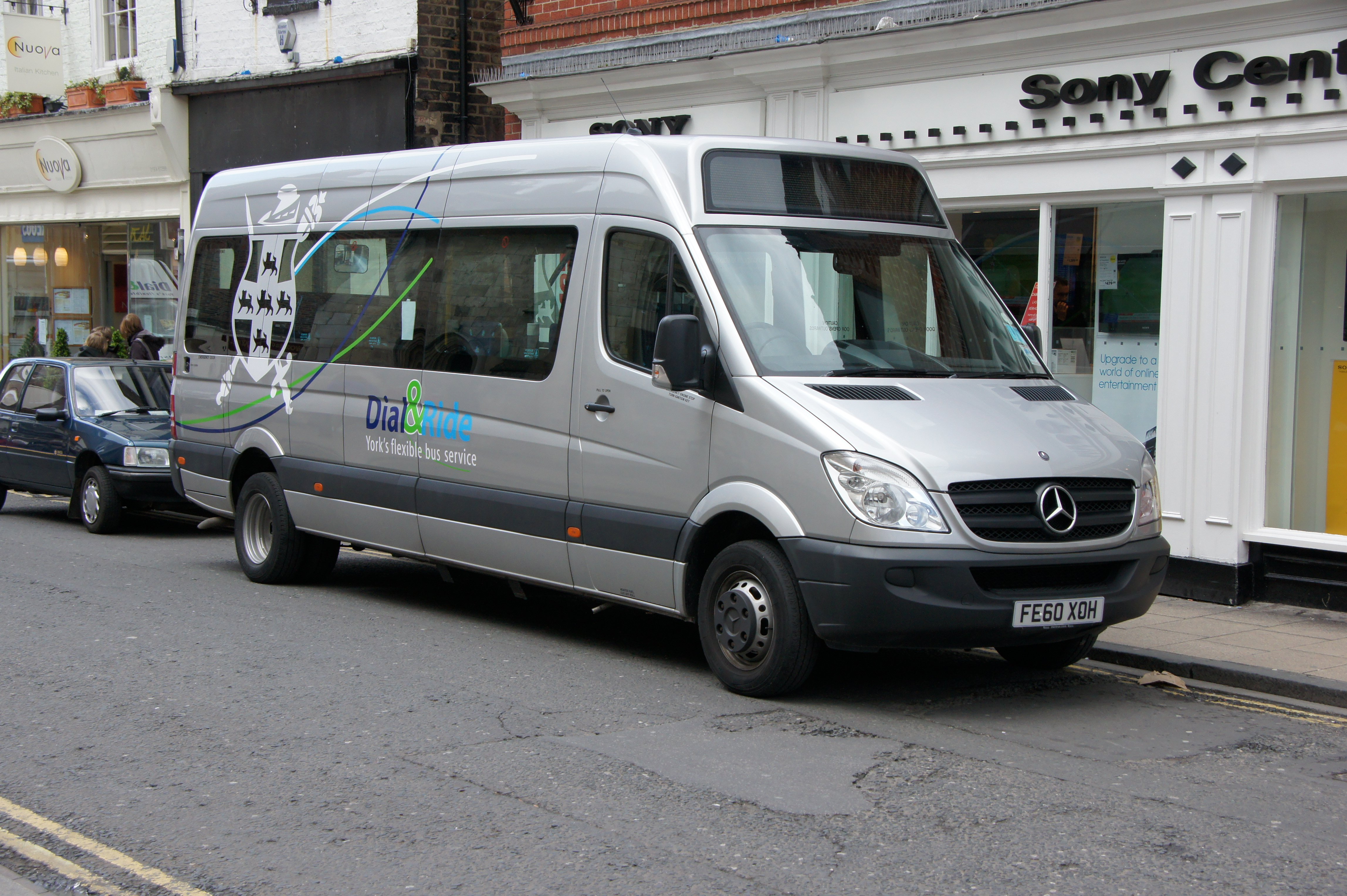
A Telebus service in York

A Telebus, Dial-a-bus, or Dial-a-ride service is a bus service that operates in a mode partway between a normal scheduled bus service and a taxi; it is a form of demand responsive transport. Telebuses typically have a scheduled route, but passengers can ring and book a pick-up within an area served by the route, and the bus route is modified to make the pick-up. Drop offs anywhere within the area can also be accommodated. The aim is to extend public transport services to the front door of all residences, or from any place to any place. Some services operate exclusively for disabled or elderly passengers; other services are open to the general public.

The term Paratransit has been used as a term for Telebus service. But possibly because paratransit sounds to the uninitiated like a service for the disabled, other terms such as Telebus have become more popular, particularly for services not primarily intended to service disabled passengers. Often paratransit is used to mean Demand responsive transport that is limited to disabled passengers.

== Examples ==
The city of Regina in Canada was one of the early pioneers of Telebus services. Their service operated from the early 1970s until the early 1980s. Other cities have since initiated services.

A number of public Telebus services formerly operated in the outer suburbs of Melbourne, Australia, however these services were replaced by FlexiRide, which is similar to the former but lacks a fixed route. Melbourne's TeleBus was a hybrid between a series of regular bus routes, complete with bus stops, and a demand-responsive bus which could perform minor deviations in order to pick up or set down passengers who had booked the service. By contrast, FlexiRide is purely an on-demand service, there are no FlexiRide-specific bus stops and the bus does not run if there are no bookings.

== See also ==
- Bus
- Paratransit
- Share taxi
