= FlexiRide =

Australian on-demand bus service

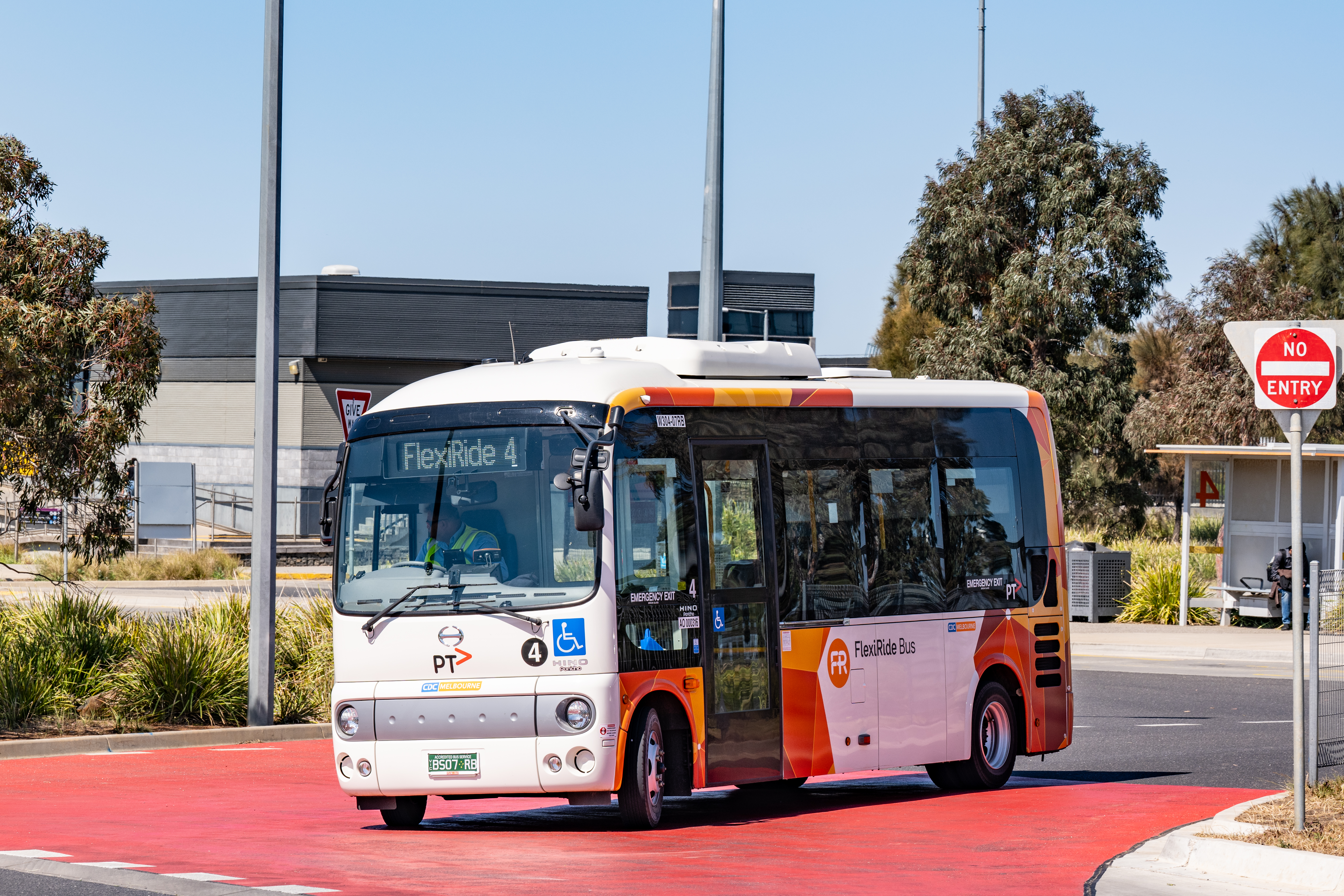
- FlexiRide bus operating at Tarneit station

Overview
- Owner: Public Transport Victoria
- Area served: Croydon; Lilydale; Melton South; Mooroolbark; Mulwala; Rosebud; Rowville; Tarneit North; Woodend; Yarrawonga
- Locale: Victoria; Australia
- Transit type: Demand-responsive transport
- Number of lines: 9 service areas

Operation
- Began operation: 25 November 2013; 12 years ago
- Operators: CDC Melbourne; Dysons; Transit Systems Victoria; Ventura Bus Lines; Yarrawonga Mulwala Taxis

FlexiRide is an on-demand bus service operating in Victoria, Australia, which is overseen by Public Transport Victoria. FlexiRide is the successor to the previous on-demand service in Victoria, Telebus, which operated in Chirnside Park, Croydon Hills, Lilydale, Mooroolbark, and Rowville.

FlexiRide services operate within a fixed service area, and passengers can book trips anywhere within that service area to or from designated FlexiRide bus hubs. The services have no fixed route, operating only when passengers book a trip using a mobile app. FlexiRide services are often introduced to replace bus routes that get low patronage rates.

FlexiRide has nine service areas that serve ten suburbs and towns. Each service area has its own bus operator and separate list of bus hubs.

== Description ==
FlexiRide services have varying hours of operation. For example, the Rowville service runs from 6:00 am to 8:00 pm on weekdays, while the Melton South service runs from 6:00 am to 9:30 pm on weekdays.

Passengers book FlexiRide services from the FlexiRide mobile app and sometimes from a phone number. A passenger may book from any bus stop or physical location in the designated service area to or from a FlexiRide bus hub. FlexiRide bus hubs can be major locations such as railway stations, schools, or shopping centres.

Bookings may be completed in advance. A booking may also be cancelled prematurely. Accessible services are available, where a passenger may be picked up from their house or an agreed accessible location.

As FlexiRide is a cashless service, Myki is used to pay for travel. Normal Myki fares are charged to passengers.

== History ==
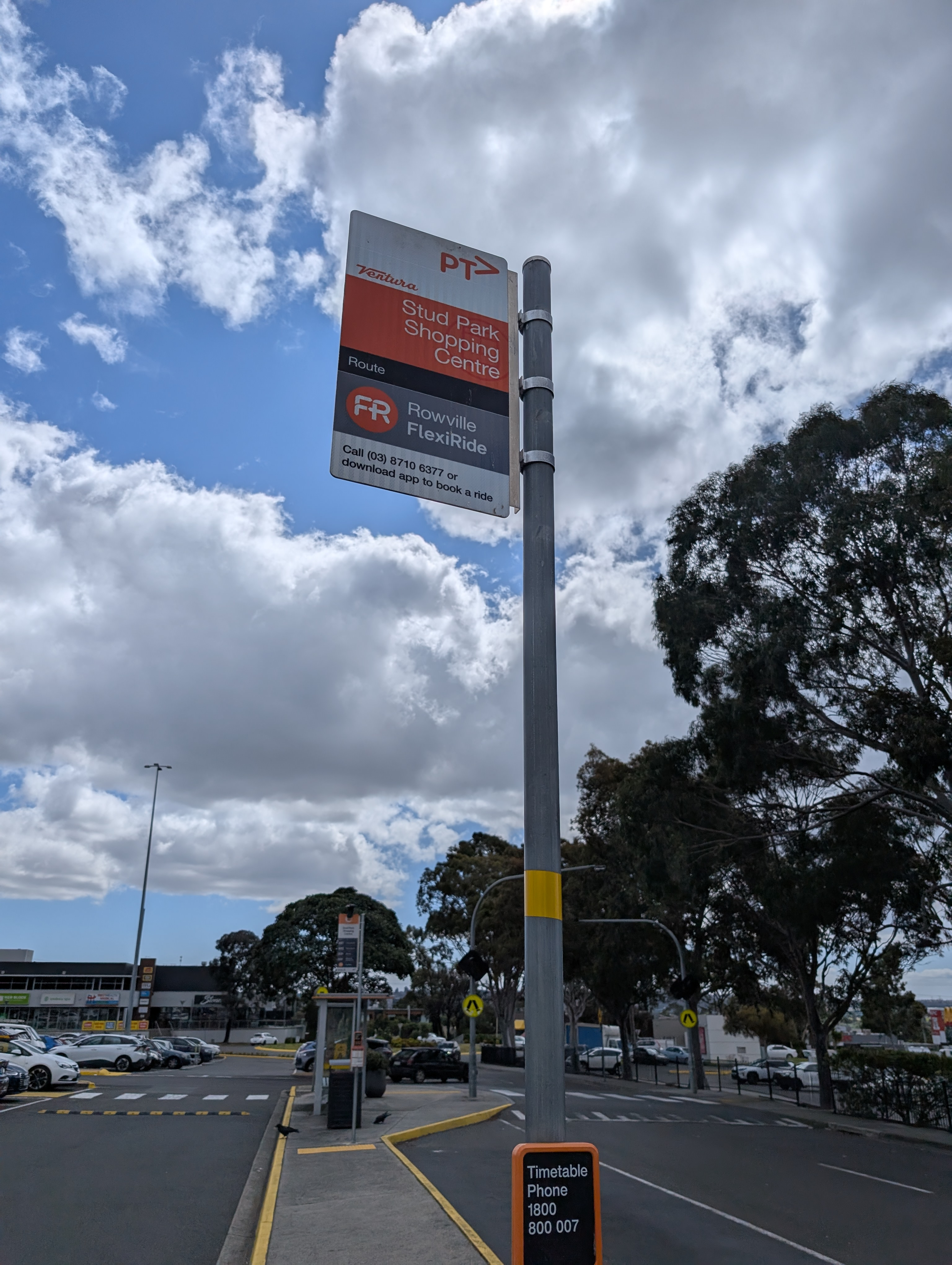
Rowville Flexiride bus stop at Stud Park Shopping Centre in Rowville, Melbourne

The first bus service under the name "FlexiRide" was the FlexiRide service in Yarrawonga and Mulwala, which commenced on 25 November 2013. More than 24 stops were placed around both towns, with taxis from Yarrawonga Mulwala Taxis used instead of buses. The service started operations as part of a 12-month trial that replaced the original bus network in the two towns. Three years later, in October 2016, FlexiRide services expanded to Woodend, becoming the first new bus service in the Shire of Macedon Ranges since the addition of new bus services in Gisborne in 2013. Later, on 31 October 2022, the FlexiRide service coverage area in Woodend expanded, as part of a 12-month trial. Under the trial, the service's hours of operation started earlier, and the coverage area expanded to Honeysuckle and Tweedle lanes.

The first Telebus routes were taken out of service on 14 December 2020, when routes 7, 8, and 9 were replaced by FlexiRide Rowville. The new service included the launch of a dedicated FlexiRide mobile app, utilising software powered by the transportation app Moovit. The Rowville FlexiRide service won the Design award at the 2021 UITP (International Association of Public Transport) Awards, which recognised FlexiRide's "convenience, flexibility, popularity and the ease in which passengers can order the service and get where they need to go." On 4 October 2021, FlexiRide services were expanded to Lilydale, Mooroolbark, and Croydon as part of a 12-month trial that replaced bus route 676 and Telebus routes 1, 2, 3, and 4. The expansion of FlexiRide services to these areas marked the end of the Telebus service.

The first services in Melbourne's west started on 12 December 2021, when services expanded to Melton South. The area was targeted by Victoria's Bus Plan. FlexiRide services in Melton South operate under a different mobile app, utilising software from the Bridj platform. On 21 February 2022, services expanded to Rosebud on the Mornington Peninsula, as part of a 12-month trial which replaced bus route 787 between Safety Beach and Rosebud and bus route 886 entirely. On 23 October 2022, services expanded to Tarneit North. Between the service's commencement and 27 February 2023, an average of 210–220 rides per day was recorded.

Some FlexiRide services have also been proposed. Between 27 September and 23 October 2022, Public Transport Victoria held a community consultation survey for a potential FlexiRide service in Greensborough, which would involve terminating the existing bus routes 514 and 517 at Greensborough and the discontinuation of route 518. Due to concerns, a FlexiRide service was not introduced. On 24 October 2022, the Liberal Party of Victoria proposed a FlexiRide service for Sunbury.

== Service areas ==
FlexiRide operates in the following areas.

FlexiRide service areas
| FlexiRide Service | Operator | Bus hubs served |
|---|---|---|
| Croydon | Ventura Bus Lines | Croydon station; Mooroolbark station |
| Lilydale | Ventura Bus Lines | Lilydale station; Chirnside Park Shopping Centre; Lilydale shopping precinct |
| Melton South | Transit Systems Victoria | Melton station; Cobblebank station; Woodgrove Shopping Centre; Melton education precinct; Melton bus interchange |
| Mooroolbark | Ventura Bus Lines | Mooroolbark station; Chirnside Park Shopping Centre |
| Rosebud (Mornington Peninsula) | Ventura Bus Lines | Rosebud Village Shopping Centre; Dromana Hub Shopping Centre; Rosebud Hospital; Rosebud Plaza |
| Rowville | Ventura Bus Lines | Ferntree Gully station; Stud Park Shopping Centre |
| Tarneit North | CDC Melbourne | Tarneit station; Tarneit Central Shopping Centre; Tarneit P-9 College; Baden Powell P-9 College; Truganina P-9 College; Tarneit Senior College |
| Woodend | Dysons | Woodend station; Woodend Shopping Centre; St Ambrose Parish Primary School; Brooke Street Medical Centre; Woodend Community Centre; Woodend CFA (Country Fire Authority); Norma Richardson Hall |
| Yarrawonga and Mulwala | Yarrawonga Mulwala Taxis | Multiple |
