= Chirnside Park Shopping Centre =

- Location: 239-241 Maroondah Highway, Chirnside Park, Victoria, Australia
- Coordinates: 37°45′26″S 145°18′45″E
- Opened: June 1979
- Developer: Hooker Corporation
- Manager: GPT Group
- Owner: GPT Wholesale Shopping Centre Fund
- Num. of stores: 119
- Num. of anchor tenants: 7
- Floor area: 38,800 m^{2} (418,000 sq ft)
- Floors: 2
- Parking: 2,000+ spaces
- Website: www.chirnsidepark.com.au

Chirnside Park Shopping Centre is a major regional shopping centre located in Chirnside Park, a suburb of Melbourne, Australia. Situated 32 kilometres east-north-east of the Melbourne central business district, the centre operates as a primary commercial and civic hub for the Yarra Valley region. Owned by the GPT Wholesale Shopping Centre Fund and managed by GPT Group, the centre has a gross lettable area of approximately 38,800 square metres.

The centre features 119 retailers, anchored by major national chains including Coles, Woolworths, Aldi, Kmart, Target and an eight-screen Reading Cinemas complex. In 2022, it became the first shopping centre in Victoria to achieve Climate Active carbon-neutral certification.

== History ==
=== Origins (1979–1989) ===
Chirnside Park Shopping Centre officially opened in June 1979, originally marketed as the "Chirnside Park Shopping Centre & Market Place". Developed by the Hooker Corporation under the leadership of property developer George Herscu, it was initially designed as a convenience-oriented mini-mall to service the rapidly expanding residential corridors of Melbourne's eastern fringe. Upon opening, it featured over 100 specialty retailers and was anchored by a Safeway supermarket, a Coles New World, Kmart, and Magnet Discounts.

=== Expansion and redevelopment (1989–2006) ===
In 1989, the centre was sold by Herscu's company to Growth Equities Mutual. The centre underwent significant expansion during the late 1990s, which included the addition of a Target discount department store.

Lendlease subsequently acquired the property, owning it from 2000 to 2006. During Lendlease's tenure, the centre underwent further transformative expansion that shifted its focus from purely transactional grocery shopping to a broader regional destination. This phase included the construction of new specialty retail wings and the introduction of an eight-screen Reading Cinemas complex, which successfully extended the centre's trading hours and captured the evening entertainment market.

=== GPT Group era (2007–present) ===
The GPT Group assumed management and ownership of the facility in 2007 via the GPT Wholesale Shopping Centre Fund. Under GPT's stewardship, the centre has undergone strategic tenancy remixing to focus on non-discretionary retail, experiential services, and an extensive fresh food precinct.

Between 2024 and 2025, GPT executed a $10 million internal architectural refresh. This project improved natural light penetration through refurbished skylights, upgraded the Market Hall and Food Court, introduced a new children's playground, and revitalised the North Fresh Food Entry to improve pedestrian permeability between the car parks and the retail concourse.

== Sustainability ==
In late 2022, Chirnside Park became the first shopping centre in Victoria to be certified as a carbon-neutral retail asset by Climate Active. This was achieved through the implementation of a 'Smart Energy Hub', developed in partnership with Shell Energy Australia and supported by a $500,000 grant from the Victorian Government.

The system includes a 2 megawatt-hour (MWh) centralized battery storage system and a 650-kilowatt (kW) rooftop solar array. Using predictive demand-response software, the centre can reduce its peak electricity demand by up to 70% during extreme grid-stress events, providing stabilization to the broader Victorian electricity grid. Residual carbon emissions are offset through a partnership with Greenfleet, a not-for-profit environmental organisation.

== Transport and accessibility ==
The centre acts as a formalised public transport interchange for the Yarra Ranges region. The dedicated bus interchange services numerous Public Transport Victoria (PTV) routes, providing critical feeder connections to the nearby Lilydale, Mooroolbark, Croydon, and Ringwood railway stations.

For private vehicles, the centre provides over 2,000 free parking spaces, divided between open-air car parks and significant basement car parking located below Kmart and Aldi. The strategic parking zones are designed to manage dwell times for both convenience shopping and entertainment.

== Adjacent developments ==
Located nearby at 266 Maroondah Highway is the Chirnside Lifestyle Centre. Developed in 2022 by MaxCap Group and Troon Group on a 3.5-hectare site previously earmarked for Masters Home Improvement and Kaufland, this 11,100 square metre large format retail centre houses major bulky goods brands like Baby Bunting and Super Cheap Auto. The fully leased centre was acquired by IOOF Investment Services in 2023 for over $50 million. It operates in commercial synergy with the main shopping centre, effectively clustering retail density within the Chirnside Park precinct.
