= HTD =

HTD may refer to:

- Heatherdale railway station, Victoria, Australia, station code
- Hospital for Tropical Diseases, in London, England
