= Nunawading railway station =

Railway station in Melbourne, Australia

Nunawading
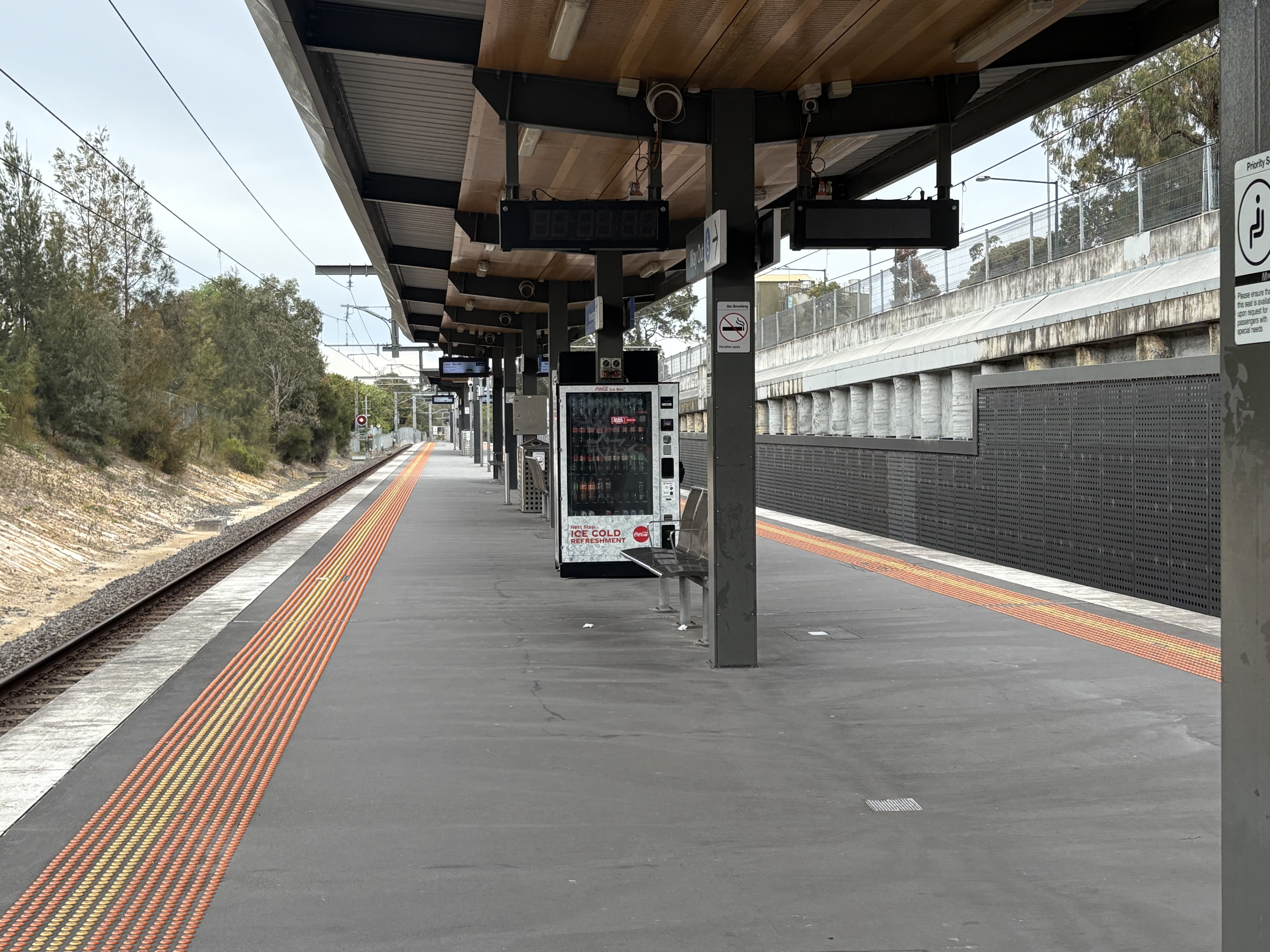
- Westbound view from Platform 1, October 2025

General information
- Location: Springvale Road, Nunawading, Victoria 3131; City of Whitehorse; Australia
- Coordinates: 37°49′13″S 145°10′38″E
- System: PTV commuter rail station
- Owner: VicTrack
- Operator: Metro Trains
- Lines: Lilydale; Belgrave
- Distance: 20.80 kilometres from Southern Cross
- Platforms: 2 (island)
- Tracks: 2
- Connections: Bus

Construction
- Structure type: Cutting
- Depth: 8 m (26 ft)
- Parking: Yes
- Cycle facilities: Yes
- Accessible: Yes

Other information
- Status: Operational, premium station
- Station code: NWG
- Fare zone: Myki zone 2
- Website: Public Transport Victoria

History
- Opened: 4 June 1888; 138 years ago
- Closed: 18 December 2009
- Rebuilt: 11 January 2010
- Electrified: January 1923 (1500 V DC overhead)
- Former names: Tunstall (1888–1945)

Passengers
- 2005–2006: 788,028
- 2006–2007: 838,503 ▲6.4%
- 2007–2008: 903,848 ▲7.8%
- 2008–2009: 925,532 ▲2.4%
- 2009–2010: 802,559 ▼13.3%
- 2010–2011: 813,962 ▲1.42%
- 2011–2012: 841,240 ▲3.35%
- 2012–2013: Not measured
- 2013–2014: 996,058 ▲18.4%
- 2014–2015: 1,026,669 ▲3.07%
- 2015–2016: 1,135,520 ▲10.6%
- 2016–2017: 949,336 ▼16.4%
- 2017–2018: 1,113,940 ▲17.34%
- 2018–2019: 1,148,007 ▲3.06%
- 2019–2020: 888,900 ▼22.57%
- 2020–2021: 390,550 ▼56.1%
- 2021–2022: 421,250 ▲7.86%
- 2022–2023: 526,300 ▲24.94%
- 2023–2024: 672,750 ▲27.83%
- 2024–2025: 758,050 ▲12.68%

Services
Preceding station	Metro Trains	Following station
Blackburn towards Flinders Street	Lilydale line	Mitcham towards Lilydale
Blackburn towards Flinders Street	Belgrave line	Mitcham towards Belgrave
Track layout
Location

Nunawading station is a railway station operated by Metro Trains Melbourne on the Belgrave and Lilydale lines, which are part of the Melbourne rail network. It serves the eastern suburb of the same name. It was opened on 4 June 1888, with the current station being provided in 2010.

Initially called Tunstall, the station was given its current name of Nunawading on 1 November 1945, which coincided with the creation of the City of Nunawading, formerly the Shire of Blackburn and Mitcham

== History ==
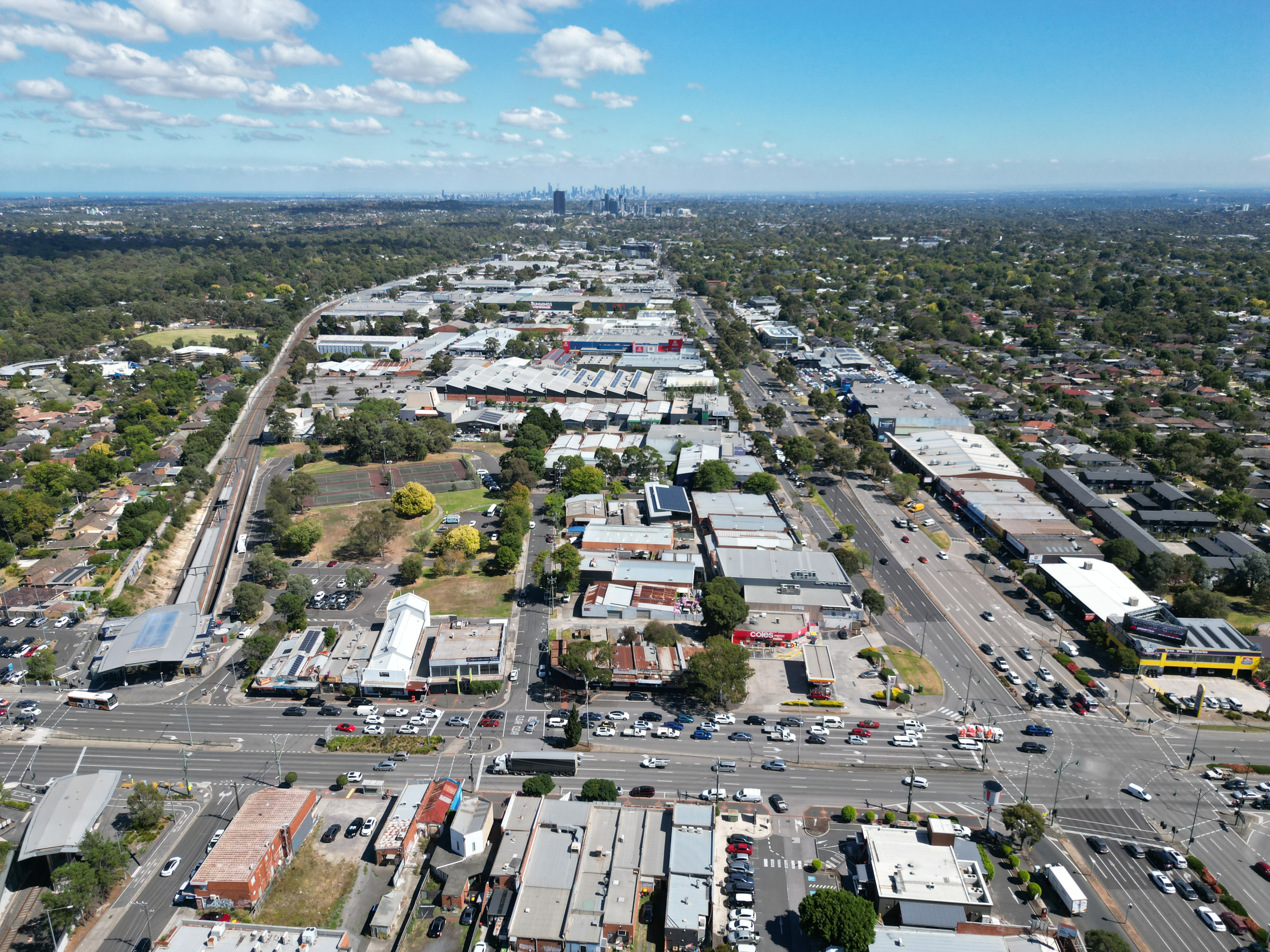
Nunawading station from above, looking towards Melbourne, March 2024

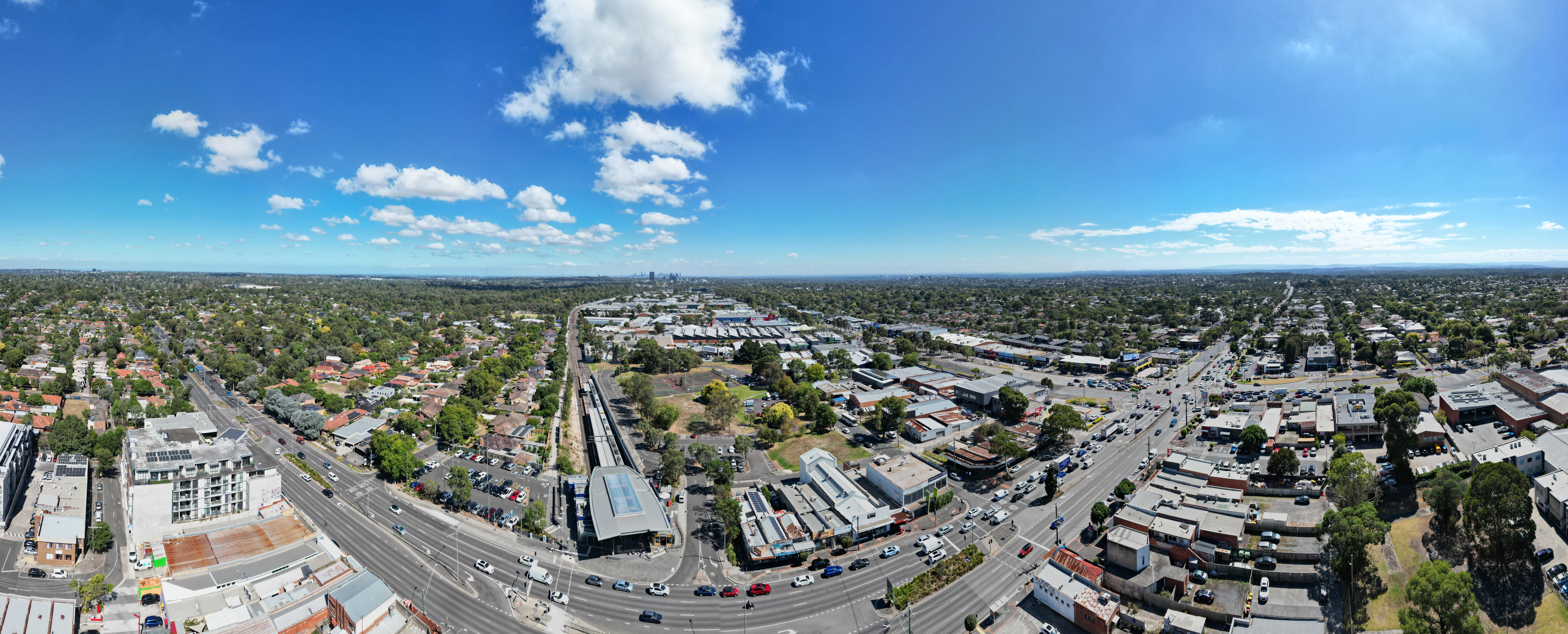
Aerial panorama of Nunawading, looking towards Melbourne, March 2024.

Nunawading station opened almost six years after the railway line from Camberwell was extended to Lilydale. Like the suburb itself, the name of the station derives from an Aboriginal word, numphawading, meaning ceremonial ground or battlefield. The settlement immediately adjacent to the station was originally named after Tunstall, England, famous for its potteries.

In 1956, boom barriers replaced hand-operated gates at the former Springvale Road level crossing, which was located at the up end of the station.

In 1979, under the Melbourne Bicycle Strategy, the station was one of three used as trial sites for new bike lockers, which were available either for occasional, monthly, or quarterly hire.

On 18 December 2009, the original ground-level station closed as part of a grade separation project to replace the Springvale Road level crossing. A new station, in a cutting west of Springvale Road, opened on 11 January 2010.

== Platforms and services ==
Nunawading is served by Lilydale and Belgrave line trains and consists of an island platform with two faces located on the western side of Springvale Road, an has concourses on both sides of the road.

The main concourse, on the western side, comprises a customer service counter, an enclosed waiting room, toilets and a café. The concourse on the eastern side is linked to the platforms via an underpass under Springvale Road. Both concourses have stairs and lifts that provide access to the platforms. Both concourses have access to the Ringwood – Box Hill bike path. On the platforms, there are metal benches, vending machines, and passenger information displays. The station car park is on the corner of Laughlin Avenue and Springvale Road.

Nunawading platform arrangement
Platform	Line	Destination	Via	Service Type	Notes	Source
1	Belgrave line Lilydale line	Flinders Street	City Loop	All stations and limited express services	See City Loop for operating patterns	
2	Belgrave line Lilydale line	Ringwood, Mooroolbark, Lilydale, Upper Ferntree Gully, Belgrave		All stations and limited express services		

== Transport links ==
Kinetic Melbourne operates two bus routes via Nunawading station, under contract to Public Transport Victoria:

- 273 : to The Pines Shopping Centre
- SmartBus 902 : Chelsea station – Westfield Airport West

Ventura Bus Lines operates one route to and from Nunawading station, under contract to Public Transport Victoria:

- 735 : to Box Hill station

== Gallery ==
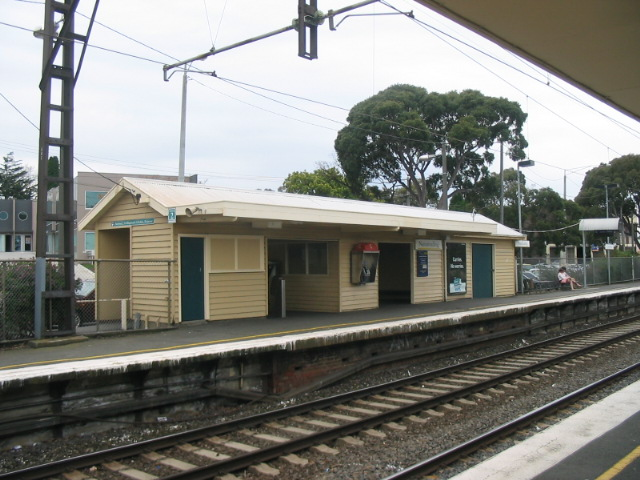
Former ground-level Platform 2 building prior to demolition, September 2005

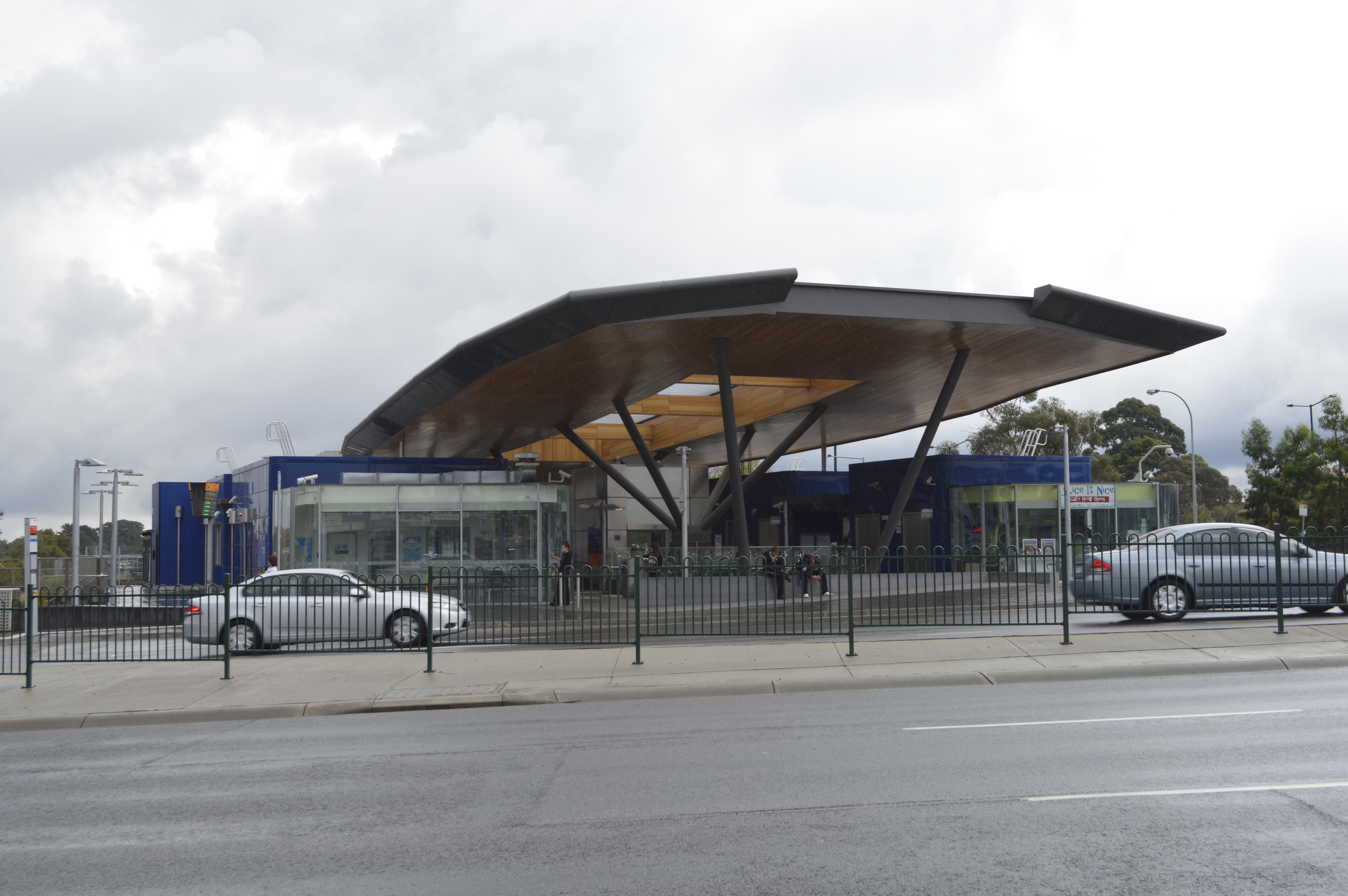
Station concourse and entrance, May 2014
