= Mitcham railway station, Melbourne =

Railway station in Melbourne, Australia

Mitcham
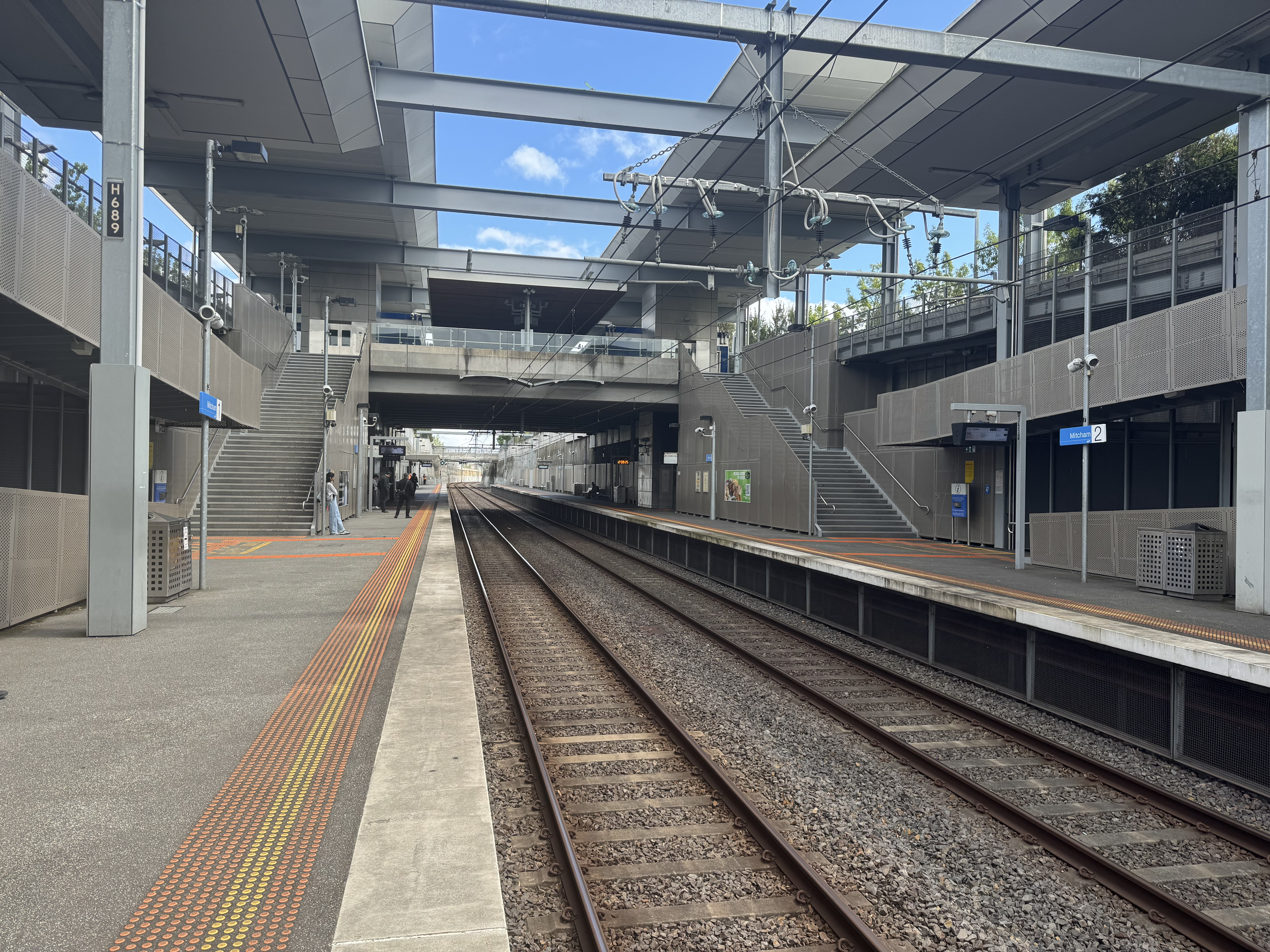
- Westbound view from Platform 1, October 2024

General information
- Location: Mitcham Road, Mitcham, Victoria 3132; City of Whitehorse; Australia
- Coordinates: 37°49′05″S 145°11′34″E
- System: PTV commuter rail station
- Owner: VicTrack
- Operator: Metro Trains
- Lines: Lilydale; Belgrave
- Distance: 22.47 kilometres from Southern Cross
- Platforms: 2 side
- Tracks: 2
- Connections: Bus

Construction
- Structure type: Below ground
- Parking: 700
- Cycle facilities: 22
- Accessible: Yes—step free access

Other information
- Status: Operational, premium station
- Station code: MCH
- Fare zone: Myki zone 2
- Website: Public Transport Victoria

History
- Opened: 25 December 1882; 143 years ago
- Rebuilt: 1989; 25 January 2014
- Electrified: January 1923 (1500 V DC overhead)

Passengers
- 2005–2006: 1,076,423
- 2006–2007: 1,064,277 ▼1.12%
- 2007–2008: 1,132,359 ▲6.4%
- 2008–2009: 1,129,936 ▼0.21%
- 2009–2010: 1,095,145 ▼3.08%
- 2010–2011: 1,184,989 ▲8.2%
- 2011–2012: 1,120,980 ▼5.4%
- 2012–2013: Not measured
- 2013–2014: 934,937 ▼16.6%
- 2014–2015: 1,138,978 ▲21.82%
- 2015–2016: 1,338,692 ▲17.53%
- 2016–2017: 1,040,199 ▼22.3%
- 2017–2018: 1,207,834 ▲16.1%
- 2018–2019: 1,241,550 ▲2.79%
- 2019–2020: 945,050 ▼23.9%
- 2020–2021: 401,050 ▼57.6%
- 2021–2022: 511,650 ▲27.57%
- 2022–2023: 647,850 ▲26.62%
- 2023–2024: 833,250 ▲28.62%
- 2024–2025: 925,550 ▲11.08%

Services
Preceding station	Metro Trains	Following station
Nunawading towards Flinders Street	Lilydale line	Heatherdale towards Lilydale
Nunawading towards Flinders Street	Belgrave line	Heatherdale towards Belgrave
Track layout
Location

Mitcham station is a railway station operated by Metro Trains Melbourne on the Belgrave and Lilydale lines, which are both part of the Melbourne rail network. It serves the eastern suburb of Mitcham, in Melbourne, Victoria, Australia.

Mitcham station is a below ground premium station, featuring two side platforms connected by a ground level concourse. It opened on 25 December 1882, with the current station provided in 2014.

== History ==
Mitcham station opened on 25 December 1882, just over three weeks after the railway line from Camberwell was extended to Lilydale. Like the suburb itself, the station was named after a farm property, Mitcham Grove, owned by Wiliam Slater, a local who grew roses and herbs. Another theory is that Mitcham was named after a property, Mitcham Heights, itself named after Mitcham in Surrey, England.

In 1953, flashing light signals were provided at the former Mitcham Road level crossing, which was located at the down end of the station.

Until the 1970s, a shunting yard and goods shed existed where the southern car park exists today. Tracks remained embedded in the car park surface of that time, enabling parking for the great majority of the time when trains did not use the yard. In 1979, the station was one of three used as trial sites for new bike lockers under the Melbourne Bicycle Strategy, either for occasional, monthly or quarterly hire. Also occurring in that year, boom barriers were provided at the former level crossing. By 1985, goods services to and from the station ceased.

In 1989, the former ground level station buildings were provided, when the former signal box was relocated into the new building. On 4 April 1996, Mitcham was upgraded to a premium station.

On 2 January 2014, the original ground level station closed, as part of the grade separation project to replace the Mitcham Road and Rooks Road level crossings. It was replaced by a new below-ground station that opened on 25 January of that year.

Until their removal due to the level crossing removals, a crossover and siding were located at the up end of the station.

Mitcham was due to receive an upgraded commuter car park, following a 2019 commitment by the federal government. However, this was scrapped in 2021.

== Platforms, facilities and services ==
Mitcham has two side platforms with a concourse above on ground level. The concourse features a customer service window, an enclosed waiting room, toilets and a café. Access to the platforms is provided by stairs, lifts and ramps.

The station is serviced by Metro Trains' Lilydale and Belgrave line services.

Mitcham platform arrangement
Platform	Line	Destination	Via	Service Type	Notes	Source
1	Belgrave line Lilydale line	Flinders Street	City Loop	All stations and limited express services	See City Loop for operating patterns	
2	Belgrave line Lilydale line	Ringwood, Mooroolbark, Lilydale, Upper Ferntree Gully, Belgrave		All stations and limited express services		

== Transport links ==
Kinetic Melbourne operates four bus routes via Mitcham station, under contract to Public Transport Victoria:

- 270 : to Box Hill station
- 370 : to Ringwood station
- SmartBus 901 : Frankston station – Melbourne Airport
- SmartBus 907 : to Lonsdale Street (Melbourne CBD)

Ventura Bus Lines operate four routes to and from Mitcham station, under contract to Public Transport Victoria:

- 736 : to Blackburn station via Glen Waverley station
- 738 : to Westfield Knox
- 740 : to Vermont East
- 765 : to Box Hill station

== Gallery ==
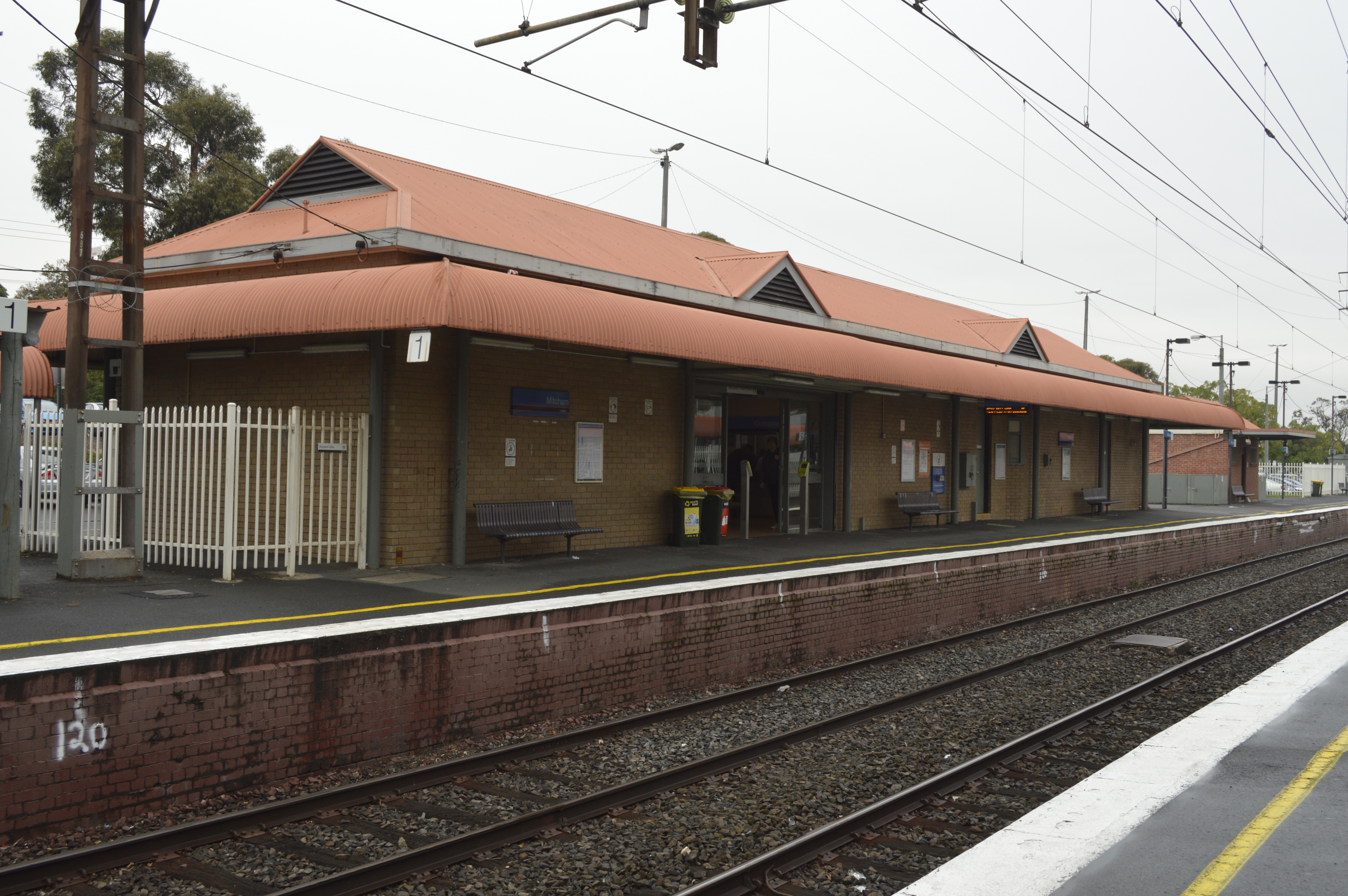
Former ground level station building on Platform 1, April 2013, prior to demolition

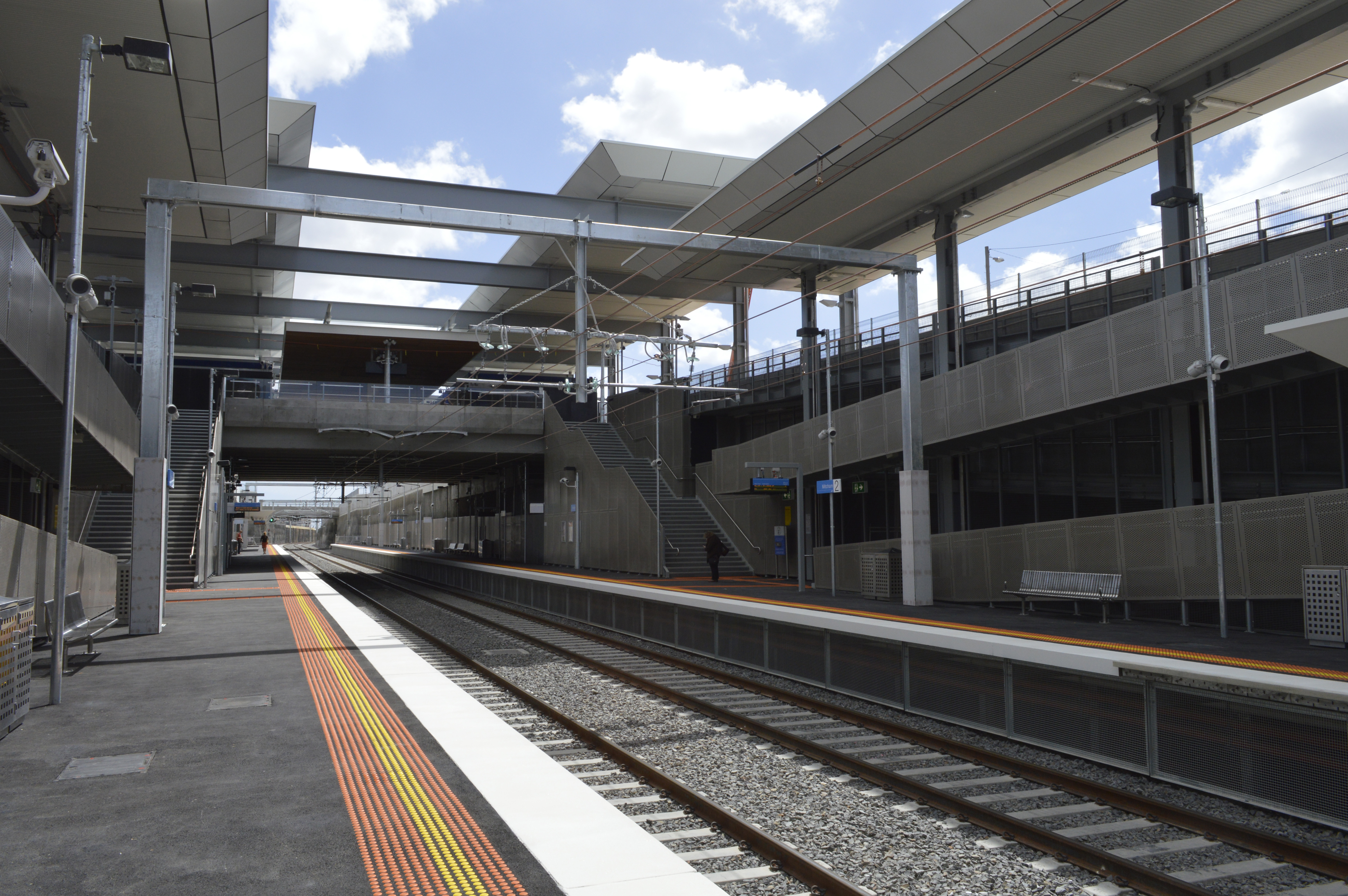
Westbound view from Platform 1, January 2014
