= Burwood =

Burwood may refer to:

== Australia ==
- Burwood, Victoria, Australia, a suburb of Melbourne
  - Burwood railway station, Melbourne
  - Electoral district of Burwood, an electoral district in Victoria
- Burwood, New South Wales, Australia, a suburb of Sydney
  - Municipality of Burwood
  - Burwood railway station, Sydney
  - Electoral district of Burwood (New South Wales), a former electoral district in New South Wales

== New Zealand ==
- Burwood, New Zealand, a suburb of Christchurch

== United Kingdom ==
- Burwood, Shropshire, a location in the United Kingdom
- Burwood Park, an area in north Surrey

== United States ==
- Burwood, Tennessee
