= Heatherdale, Victoria =

Coordinates: 37°49′14″S 145°12′21″E

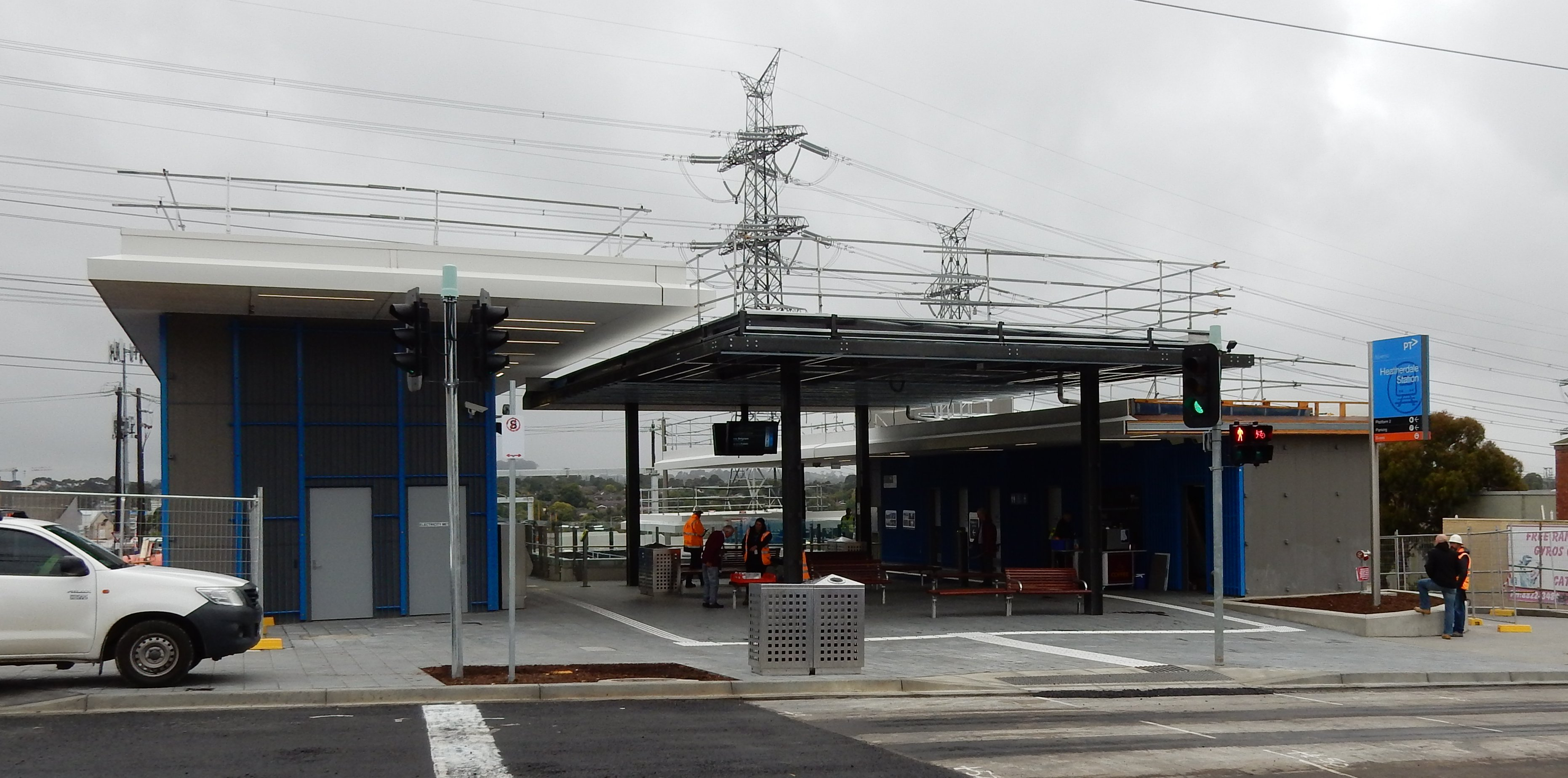
Heatherdale railway station in February 2017

Heatherdale is a neighbourhood of Mitcham, in Melbourne's eastern suburbs, centred on the Heatherdale railway station, on the Lilydale and Belgrave railway lines. It is in the local government area of the City of Whitehorse.

Heatherdale junior football club existed from 1969 until 1997 when it merged with Heathmont Junior football club to become the Heathmont Jets.
