= Ringwood railway station, Melbourne =

Railway station in Ringwood, Melbourne, Victoria, Australia

Ringwood
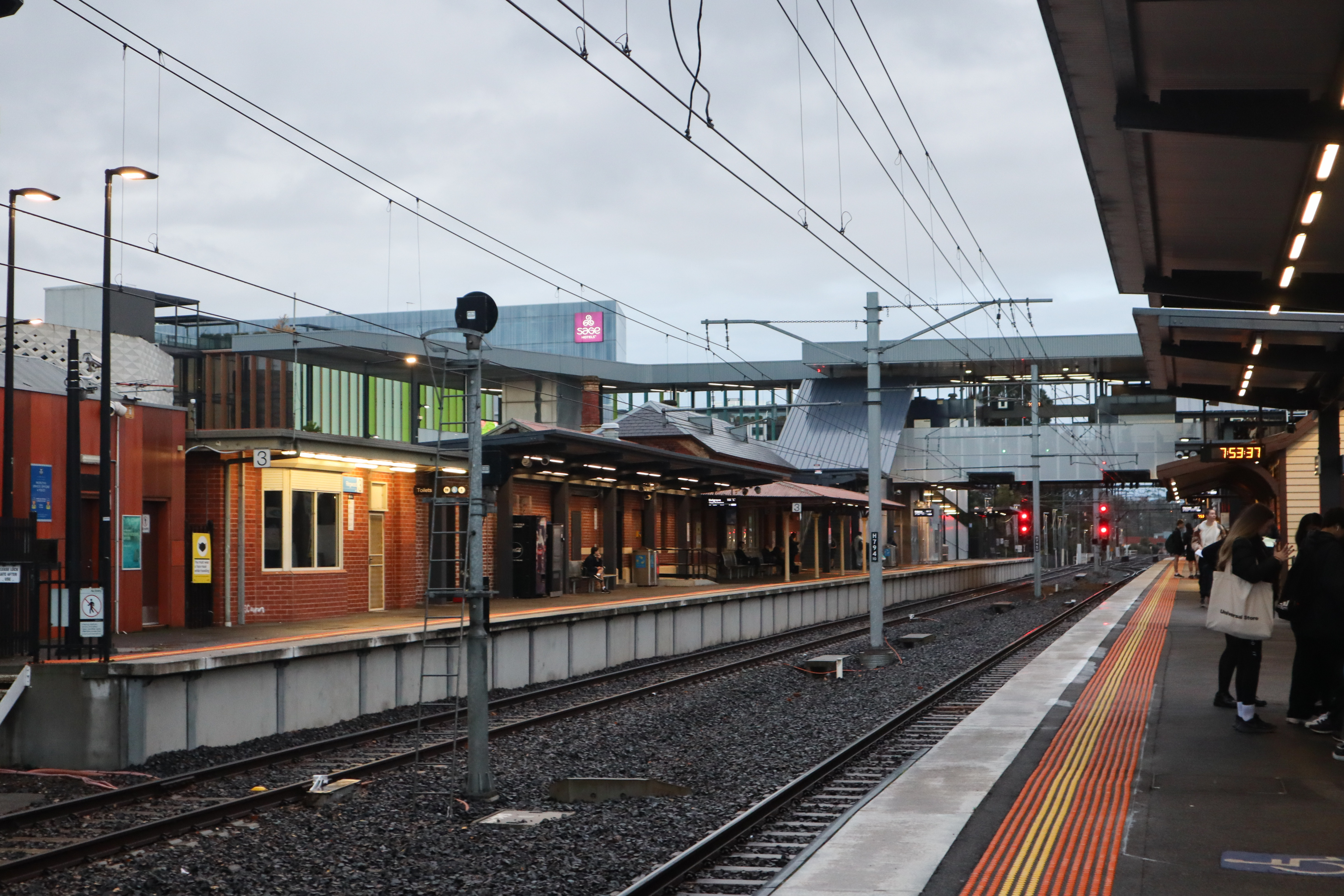
- Eastbound view from Platform 2, June 2022

General information
- Location: Railway Place, Ringwood, Victoria 3134; City of Maroondah; Australia
- Coordinates: 37°48′57″S 145°13′44″E
- System: PTV commuter rail station
- Owner: VicTrack
- Operator: Metro Trains
- Lines: Lilydale; Belgrave
- Distance: 25.76 kilometres from Southern Cross
- Platforms: 3 (1 island, 1 side)
- Tracks: 3
- Connections: Bus; Coach

Construction
- Structure type: Ground
- Parking: 180
- Cycle facilities: Yes
- Accessible: Yes — step free access

Other information
- Status: Operational, premium station
- Station code: RWD
- Fare zone: Myki zone 2
- Website: Public Transport Victoria

History
- Opened: 1 December 1882; 143 years ago
- Rebuilt: 1999; January 2016
- Electrified: January 1923 (1500 V DC overhead)

Passengers
- 2005–2006: 1,387,780
- 2006–2007: 1,422,625 ▲2.51%
- 2007–2008: 1,714,862 ▲20.54%
- 2008–2009: 1,732,603 ▲1.03%
- 2009–2010: 1,692,331 ▼2.32%
- 2010–2011: 1,788,815 ▲5.7%
- 2011–2012: 1,644,790 ▼8.05%
- 2012–2013: Not measured
- 2013–2014: 1,629,045 ▼0.95%
- 2014–2015: 1,486,975 ▼8.72%
- 2015–2016: 1,351,841 ▼9.08%
- 2016–2017: 1,756,147 ▲29.9%
- 2017–2018: 1,796,559 ▲2.3%
- 2018–2019: 1,871,373 ▲4.16%
- 2019–2020: 1,475,200 ▼21.17%
- 2020–2021: 852,050 ▼42.2%
- 2021–2022: 1,080,200 ▲26.77%
- 2022–2023: 1,334,550 ▲23.54%
- 2023–2024: 1,606,950 ▲20.41%
- 2024–2025: 1,514,250 ▼5.77%

Services
Preceding station	Metro Trains	Following station
Heatherdale towards Flinders Street	Lilydale line	Ringwood East towards Lilydale
Heatherdale towards Flinders Street	Belgrave line	Heathmont towards Belgrave
Terminus	Lilydale line Shuttle service	Ringwood East towards Lilydale
Terminus	Belgrave line Shuttle service	Heathmont towards Belgrave
Track layout
Location

Designations

Victorian Heritage Register
- Official name: Ringwood Railway Station
- Type: State Registered Place
- Criteria: a, e
- Designated: August 20, 1982
- Reference no.: H1587
- Heritage Overlay number: HO39

Ringwood station is a railway station operated by Metro Trains Melbourne on the Belgrave and Lilydale lines, part of the Melbourne rail network. It serves the eastern Melbourne suburb of Ringwood in Victoria, Australia.

Ringwood is a ground level premium station, featuring three platforms, an island platform with two faces and one side platform, connected by an accessible overground concourse. It opened on 1 December 1882, with the current station provided in 2016. The original single story brick station buildings, located on Platform 3, are listed on the Victorian Heritage Register and today function as the ticket and staff offices. The station was reopened in January 2016 as part of a multimillion dollar redevelopment of the Eastland Shopping Centre, Ringwood Town Square and Railway Place.

== History ==
Ringwood station opened on 1 December 1882, when the railway line from Camberwell was extended to Lilydale. Like the suburb itself, the station was named after Ringwood in Hampshire, England.

In 1926, a signal box was provided at the station, and was located on Platforms 1 and 2. It has since been relocated to the bus interchange. Signals are now controlled from within the station building on Platform 3.

Stabling sidings are located at the down end of the station. The sidings closest to the Lilydale line were provided in 1973, and were extended in 1978, whilst in 1979, the sidings closest to the Belgrave line and the former Bedford Road level crossing were provided. In order to construct these sidings, the Belgrave line was temporarily slewed.

In 1982, duplication of the line to Bayswater was provided, with duplication of the line to Croydon occurring in 1984.

In 1994, siding "A" was abolished. On 31 July 1996, Ringwood was upgraded to a premium station. In 1999, a major signalling project took place at the station. The project included new sets of points to replace existing ones, upgrading of all signals and a new back platform constructed (Platform 1). Prior to the project, the track on the Platform 1 side was used as a siding, which continued to the Wantirna Road bridge.

In 2015, Ringwood was upgraded as part of the Eastland Shopping Centre 2015–2016 expansion (Stage 5), with the $66 million project completed in January 2016. The work included a new concourse, the provision of lifts, a reconfigured bus interchange, CCTV and heritage work on the station buildings. The station buildings themselves were not significantly altered, as they are heritage listed.

=== Incidents and accidents ===
In February 1908, EE class steam locomotive 478 overran the buffer stops at the Wantirna Road siding, derailed and toppled down the embankment, ending up level with the road.

On 29 January 1969, L Class electric loco L1157 ran away, crashing through the same buffer stops, and stopping with its front bogie dangling over Wantirna Road.

On 16 October 1989, a Comeng and a Hitachi train set collided 500m east of the station, near the Bedford Road level crossing. The collision occurred on a bend when the 07:11 train from Belgrave, led by Comeng 589M, collided with the rear of the 07:13 train from Upper Ferntree Gully, which was stationary at the time, derailing the Comeng train. 10 injuries were reported.

On 7 December 1992, a Comeng set overshot the same siding as in the 1908 accident, with leading car 392M crashing into and stopping on top of the buffers, near the edge of the Wantirna Road bridge.

On 12 May 2010, an X'Trapolis 100 set ran off the end of the tracks and into a fence in the Ringwood stabling yard.

== Facilities, platforms and services ==
Ringwood is served by Belgrave and Lilydale line trains. It has one island platform (Platforms 1 and 2) and one side platform (Platform 3). Platform 3 and the concourse feature customer service windows, with Platforms 1 and 2 having a semi-enclosed waiting area. Platform 3 and the concourse also have toilets, with a kiosk located on Platforms 1 and 2. All platforms are accessible via ramps, stairs and lifts. The bus interchange is located outside Platform 3.

Ringwood platform arrangement
Platform	Line	Destination	Via	Service Type	Notes	Source
1	Belgrave line Lilydale line	Flinders Street	City Loop	All stations and limited express services	See City Loop for operating patterns. Services only depart from this platform during weekday peaks.	
1	Belgrave line Lilydale line	Belgrave or Lilydale		All stations	Shuttle services	
2	Belgrave line Lilydale line	Flinders Street	City Loop	All stations and limited express services	See City Loop for operating patterns.	
2	Belgrave line Lilydale line	Belgrave or Lilydale		All stations	Select services.	
3	Belgrave line Lilydale line	Mooroolbark, Lilydale, Upper Ferntree Gully or Belgrave		All stations and limited express services	Mooroolbark and Upper Ferntree Gully services only operate during weekday peaks.	

== Transport links ==
Kinetic Melbourne operates six bus routes via Ringwood station, under contract to Public Transport Victoria:

- 271 : to Box Hill station
- 364 : to Warrandyte
- 370 : to Mitcham station
- 668 : to Croydon station (via Burnt Bridge Shopping Centre)
- 669 : to Croydon station (service via Ringwood East Station)
- SmartBus 901 : Frankston station – Melbourne Airport

McKenzie's Tourist Services operates one bus route to and from Ringwood station, under contract to Public Transport Victoria:

- 684 : to Eildon

Ventura Bus Lines operates three routes to and from Ringwood station, under contract to Public Transport Victoria:

- 670 : to Box Hill Institute Lilydale Lakeside Campus
- 679 : to Chirnside Park Shopping Centre
- 742 : to Chadstone Shopping Centre

V/Line operates one road coach service via Ringwood station:

- Mt Buller – Mansfield – Melbourne (via Yea)

== Gallery ==
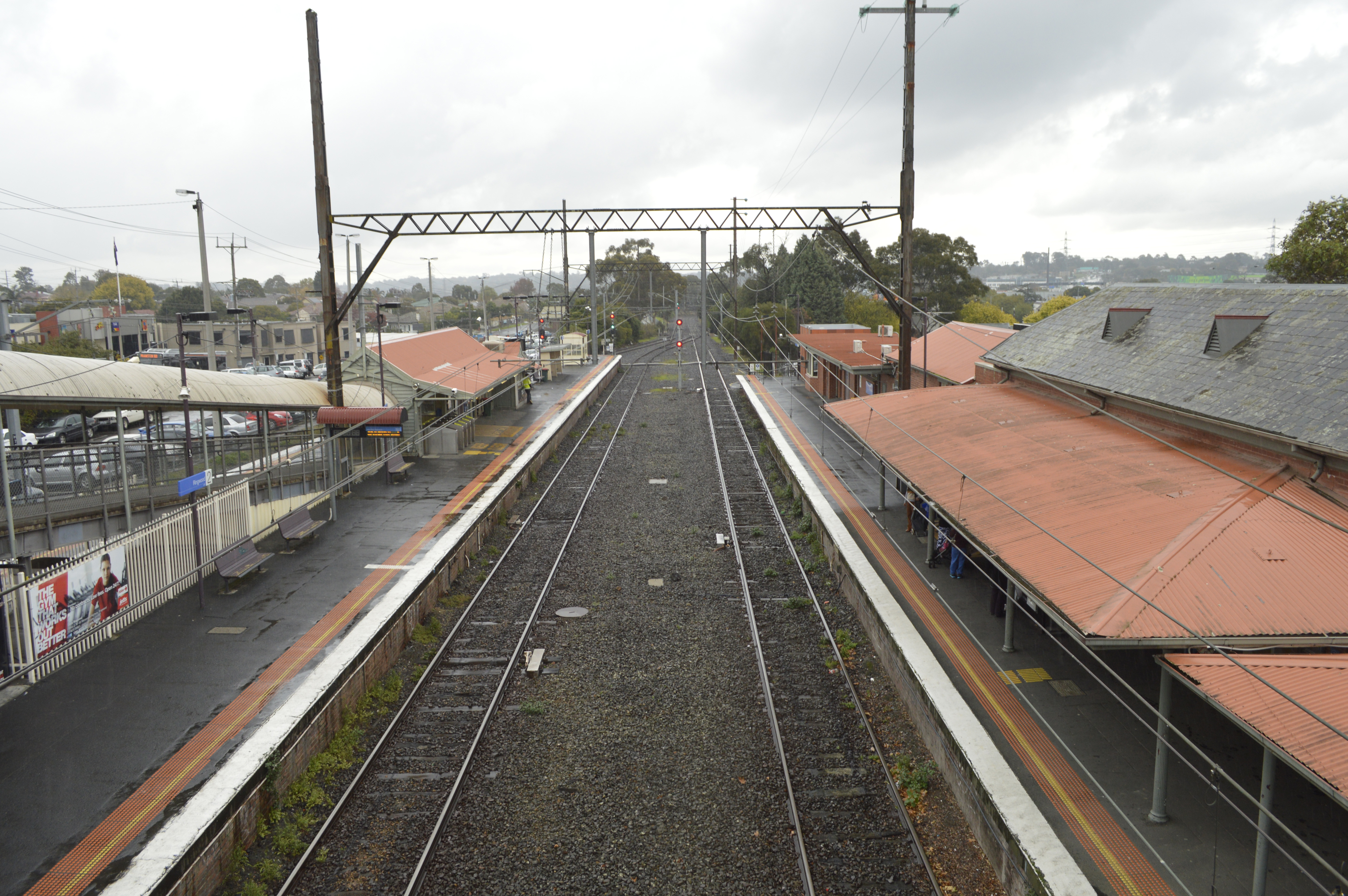
Westbound view looking over station platforms, May 2014, prior to the station upgrade

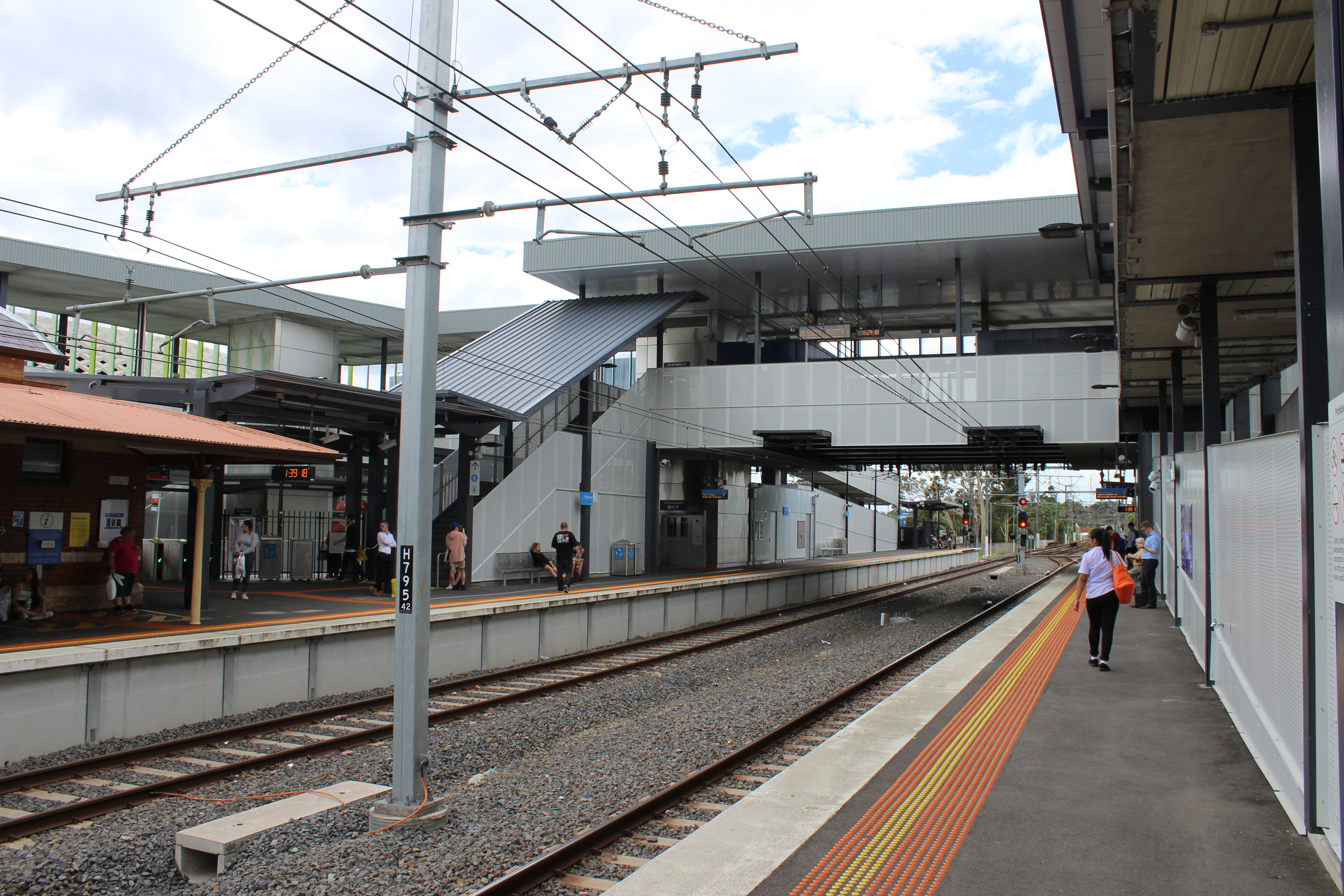
North-east bound view from Platform 2,
December 2017
