= Heatherdale railway station =

Railway station in Victoria, Australia

Heatherdale
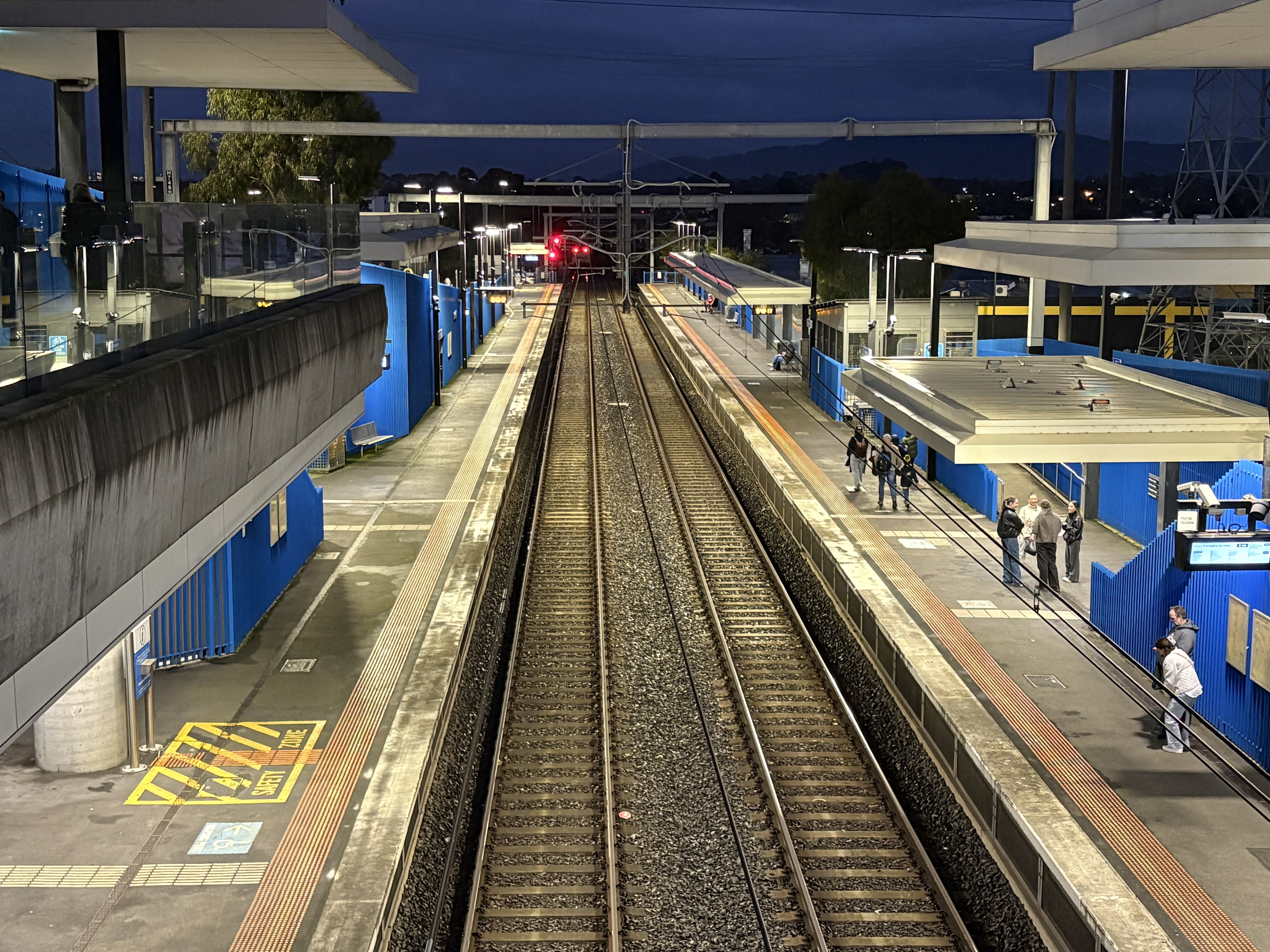
- Eastbound view of both stations platforms, viewed from concourse, July 2026

General information
- Location: Heatherdale Road, Ringwood, Victoria 3134; City of Maroondah; Australia
- Coordinates: 37°49′08″S 145°12′49″E
- System: PTV commuter rail station
- Owner: VicTrack
- Operator: Metro Trains
- Lines: Lilydale; Belgrave
- Distance: 24.21 kilometres from Southern Cross
- Platforms: 2 side
- Tracks: 2
- Connections: Bus

Construction
- Structure type: Below ground
- Parking: 515
- Cycle facilities: Yes
- Accessible: Yes—step free access

Other information
- Status: Operational, host station
- Station code: HTD
- Fare zone: Myki zone 2
- Website: Public Transport Victoria

History
- Opened: 7 September 1958; 67 years ago
- Rebuilt: 2007; 6 February 2017 (LXRP)
- Electrified: January 1923 (1500 V DC overhead)

Passengers
- 2005–2006: 567,343
- 2006–2007: 517,688 ▼8.75%
- 2007–2008: 507,340 ▼1.99%
- 2008–2009: 515,248 ▲1.55%
- 2009–2010: 505,703 ▼1.85%
- 2010–2011: 536,326 ▲6.05%
- 2011–2012: 483,564 ▼9.83%
- 2012–2013: Not measured
- 2013–2014: 558,417 ▲15.47%
- 2014–2015: 547,027 ▼2.03%
- 2015–2016: 568,734 ▲3.96%
- 2016–2017: 418,820 ▼26.35%
- 2017–2018: 555,335 ▲32.59%
- 2018–2019: 605,900 ▲9.1%
- 2019–2020: 471,200 ▼22.23%
- 2020–2021: 185,950 ▼60.53%
- 2021–2022: 224,400 ▲20.67%
- 2022–2023: 289,950 ▲29.21%
- 2023–2024: 406,400 ▲40.16%
- 2024–2025: 448,700 ▲10.41%

Services
Preceding station	Metro Trains	Following station
Mitcham towards Flinders Street	Lilydale line	Ringwood towards Lilydale
Mitcham towards Flinders Street	Belgrave line	Ringwood towards Belgrave
Track layout
Location

Heatherdale station is a railway station operated by Metro Trains Melbourne on the Belgrave and Lilydale lines, which are part of the Melbourne rail network. It serves the eastern suburb of Ringwood, in Melbourne, Victoria, Australia. Heatherdale station is a below ground host station, featuring two side platforms. It opened on 7 September 1958, with the current station provided in February 2017.

== History ==
Heatherdale station opened on 7 September 1958, and was named after the locality of the same name, itself named after Heatherdale, a farm that was owned by William Witt.

When the station opened, it was located west of the former Heatherdale Road level crossing, which was provided with boom barriers in that year.

In 2007, Heatherdale was upgraded as part of the EastLink tollway project, with the works funded by ConnectEast. Upgrades included extra parking spaces, upgraded lighting and security measures, a new pedestrian crossing at Heatherdale Road and construction of new station buildings. The original station buildings were demolished and new shelters built. New lighting and signage was also installed along the platforms. The station buildings from 2007 were demolished nine years later, due to the level crossing removal works.

From 2016 to 2017, the Level Crossing Removal Project grade separated the Heatherdale Road level crossing, demolished and rebuilt the station, and relocated it from the west side of Heatherdale Road to the east side. The rebuilt station was opened on 6 February 2017, and the level crossing was in the same month.

== Platforms, facilities and services ==
Heatherdale has two side platforms. There are three separate car parking areas that serve the station. One is just to the north of Platform 2 and is accessible from Heatherdale Road. A second car park is beside the railway line on the eastern side of Heatherdale Road, stretching towards EastLink and was redeveloped as part of the Level Crossing Removal Project. The Heatherdale Road entrance no longer serves as an exit, but a new section has been added between the railway line and Maroondah Highway, and provides as the exit and entrance. A third parking area surrounds the power transmission pylons on Molan Street. A fourth car park, accessed from Newman Street, opened in June 2013, to replace the car parks that were removed at Mitcham during the Mitcham Road crossing removal works.

It is served by Lilydale and Belgrave line trains.

Heatherdale platform arrangement
Platform	Line	Destination	Via	Service Type	Notes	Source
1	Belgrave line Lilydale line	Flinders Street	City Loop	All stations and limited express services	See City Loop for operating patterns	
2	Belgrave line Lilydale line	Ringwood, Mooroolbark, Lilydale, Upper Ferntree Gully, Belgrave		All stations		

== Transport links ==
Kinetic Melbourne operates one SmartBus route via Heatherdale station, under contract to Public Transport Victoria:

- SmartBus 901 : Frankston station – Melbourne Airport

Ventura Bus Lines operates one route via Heatherdale station, under contract to Public Transport Victoria:

- 742 : Ringwood station – Chadstone Shopping Centre

== Gallery ==
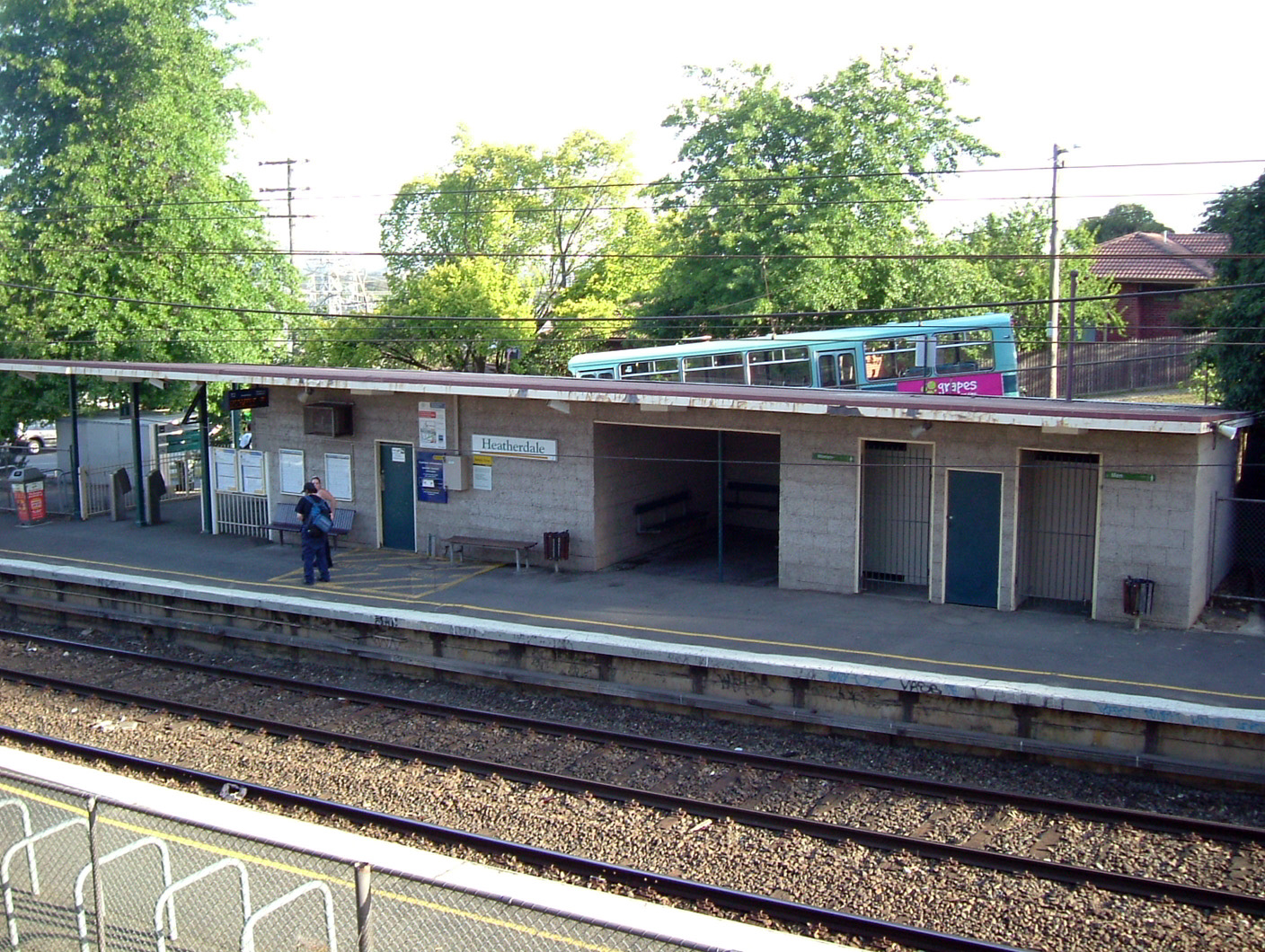
Original station building on Platform 1,
November 2006, prior to demolition

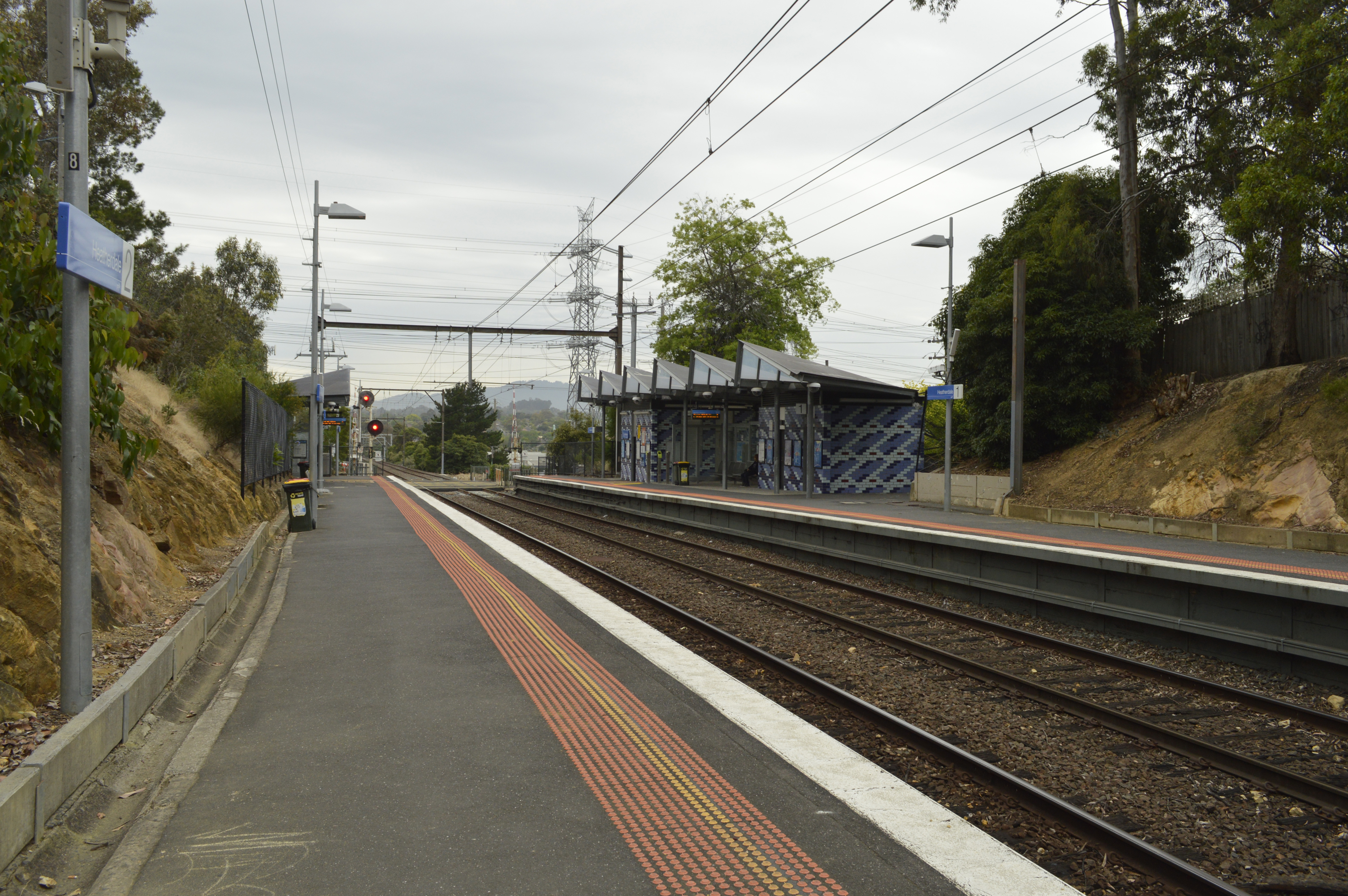
Eastbound view from former ground level
Platform 2, December 2013

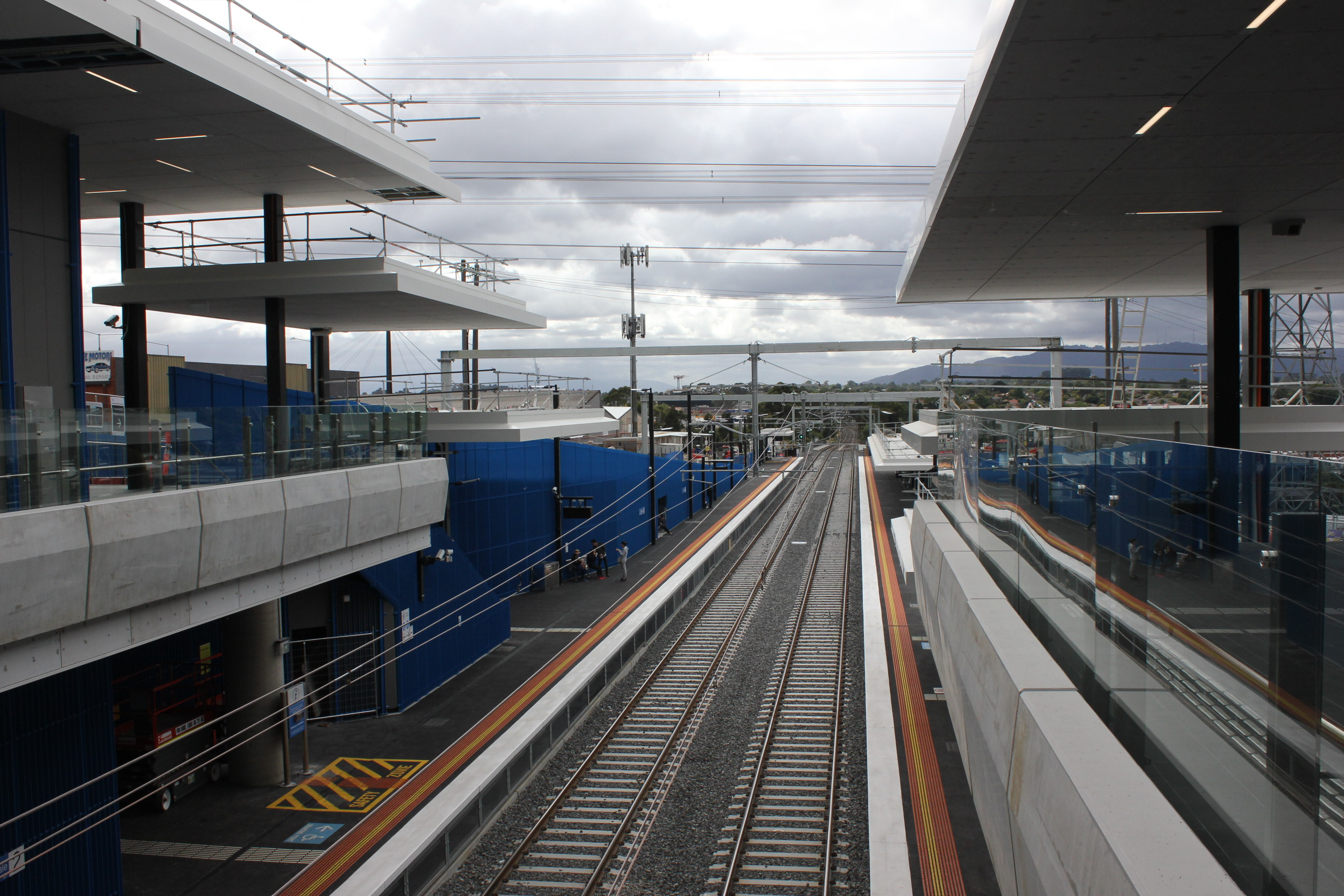
Eastbound view of the station platforms, February 2017

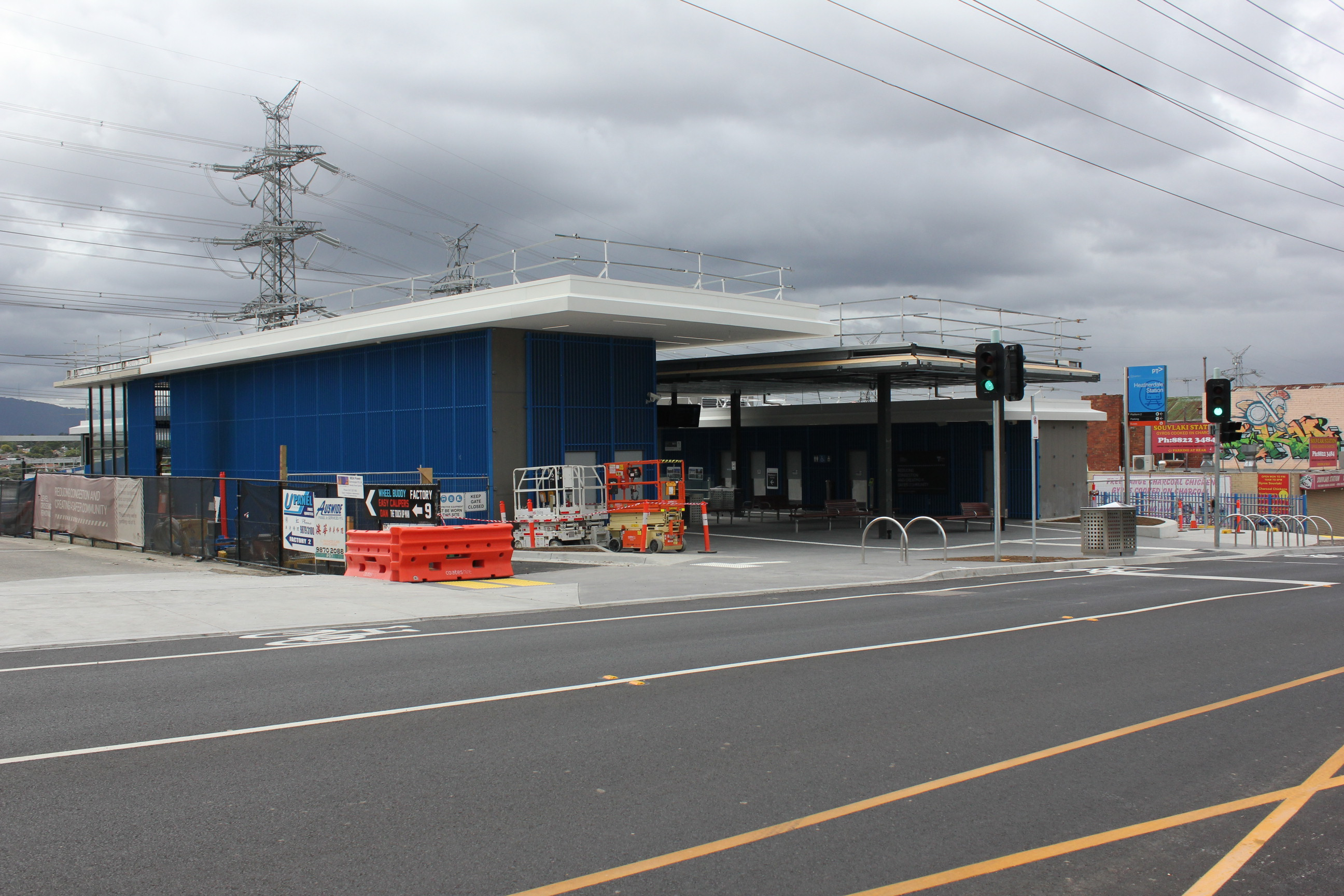
Rebuilt building and entrance to Heatherdale station, February 2017

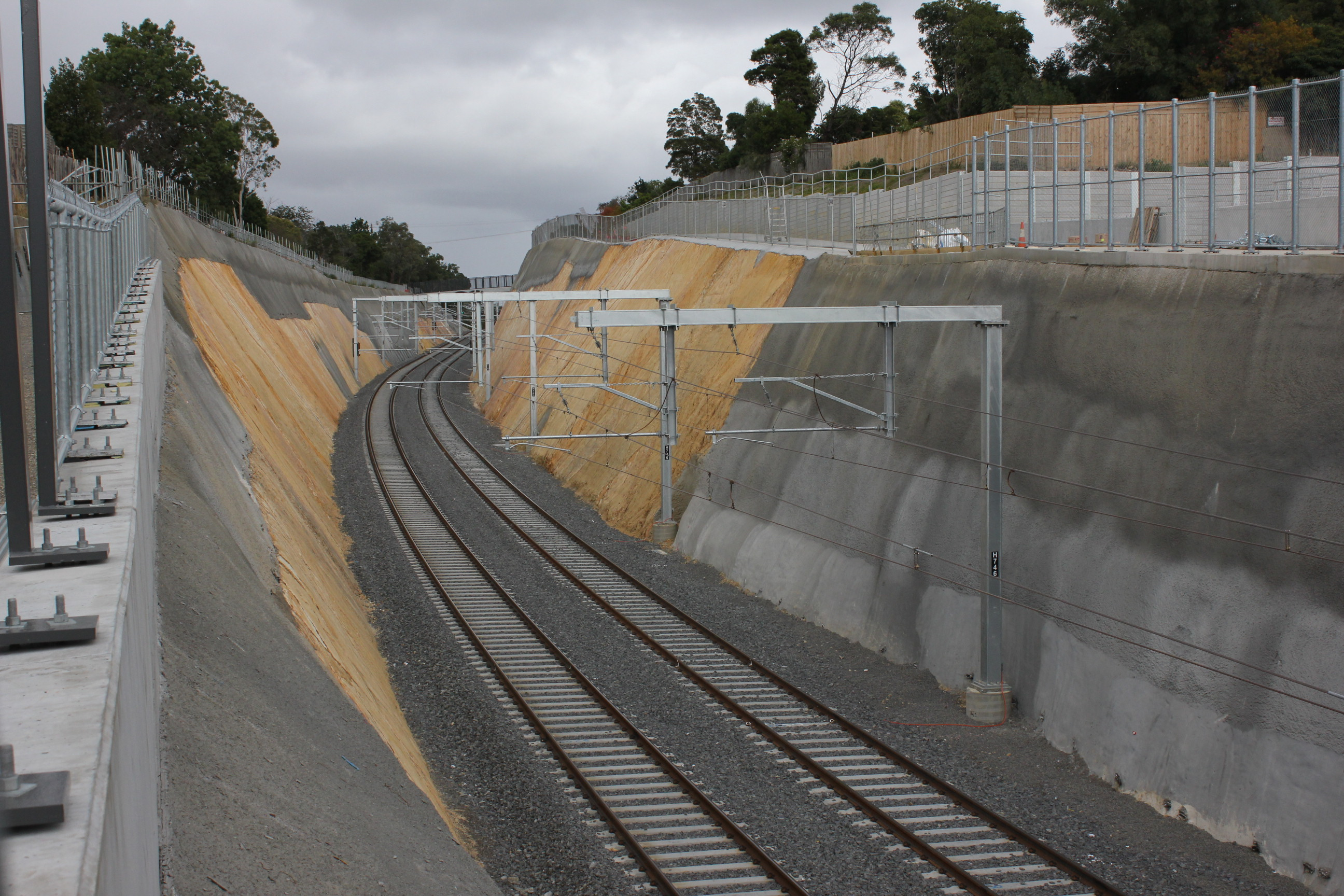
Original station site, February 2017
